= Canton of Guillon =

Coordinates: 48°14′N 3°33′E

Guillon
- Former canton
- Interactive map of Guillon
- Country: France
- Region: Bourgogne-Franche-Comté
- Department: Yonne
- No. of communes: {{{nbcomm}}}
- Disbanded: 2015
- Population (2012): 2,879

The Canton of Guillon is a former canton in the Department of Yonne, France. It had 2,879 inhabitants (2012). It was disbanded following the French canton reorganisation which came into effect in March 2015.

The canton comprised the following communes:

- Bierry-les-Belles-Fontaines
- Cisery
- Cussy-les-Forges
- Guillon
- Marmeaux
- Montréal
- Pisy
- Saint-André-en-Terre-Plaine
- Sainte-Magnance
- Santigny
- Sauvigny-le-Beuréal
- Savigny-en-Terre-Plaine
- Sceaux
- Thizy
- Trévilly
- Vassy
- Vignes
