= Sainte-Vertu =

- Commune
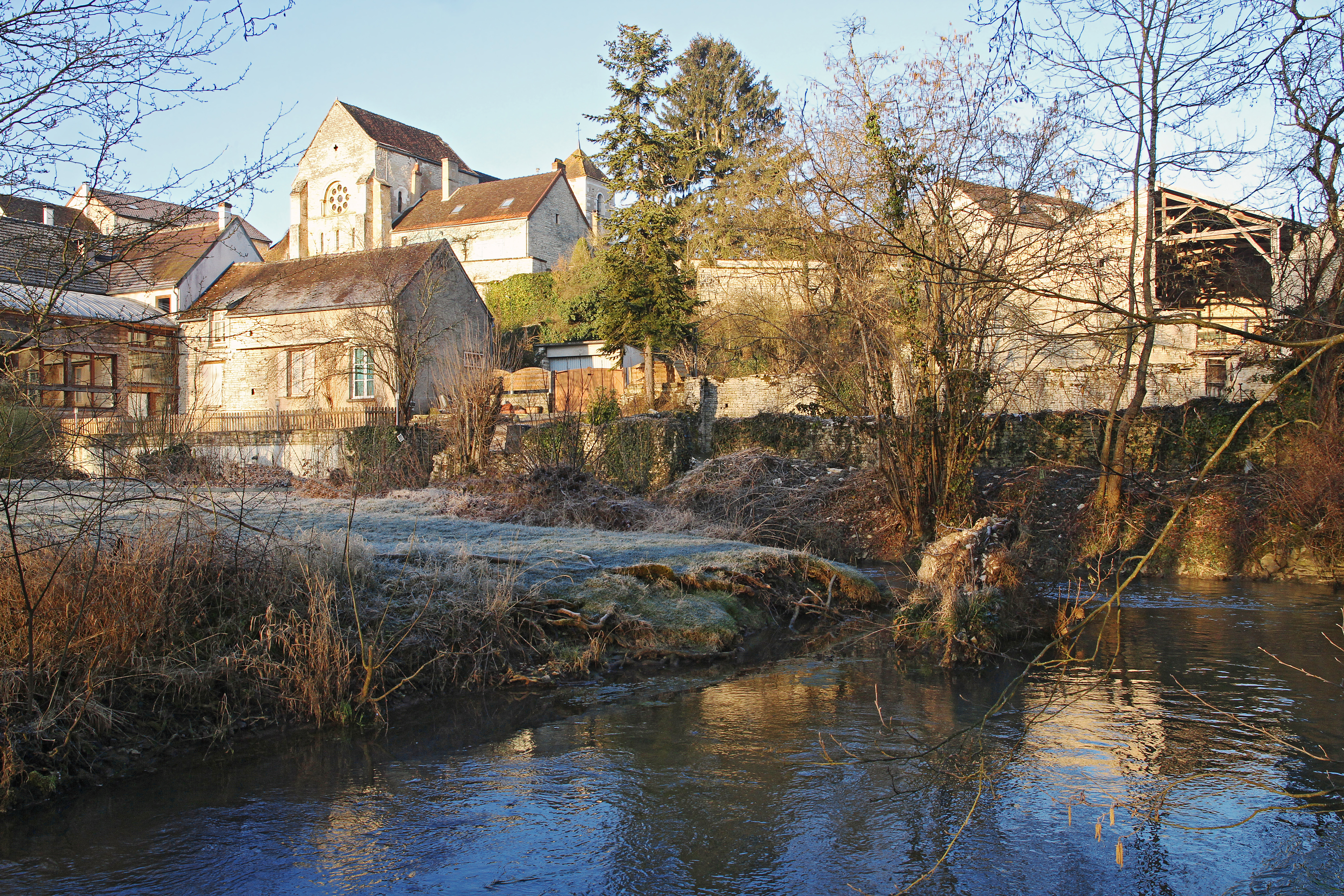
- A general view of Sainte-Vertu

- Coat of arms
- Location of Sainte-Vertu
- Location within France Location within Bourgogne-Franche-Comté
- Coordinates: 47°45′01″N 3°55′00″E
- Country: France
- Region: Bourgogne-Franche-Comté
- Department: Yonne
- Arrondissement: Avallon
- Canton: Chablis

Government
  - Mayor (2020–2026): Christophe Cheysson
- Area^{1}: 14.36 km^{2} (5.54 sq mi)
- Highest elevation: 271 m (889 ft)
- Lowest elevation: 150 m (490 ft)
- Population (2023): 66
  - Density: 4.6/km^{2} (12/sq mi)
- Time zone: UTC+01:00 (CET)
  - Summer (DST): UTC+02:00 (CEST)
- INSEE/Postal code: 89371 /89310
- ^{1} French Land Register data, which excludes lakes, ponds, glaciers > 1 km^{2} (0.386 sq mi or 247 acres) and river estuaries.

Sainte-Vertu (French pronunciation: [sɛ̃t vɛʁty]) is a commune in the Yonne department in Bourgogne-Franche-Comté in north-central France.

== Geography ==
The surrounding communes are Môlay, Poilly-sur-Serein and Aigremont. Sainte-Vertu is situated 27 km (17 mi) to the south-east of Auxerre which is the nearest large town.

The village is traversed by the little Serein River. The Morvan natural park is approximately 29 km (18 mi) away.

== Demography ==
Recorded population peaked at 544 in 1821, but has fallen back steadily subsequently, the decline accelerating with the mechanisation of agriculture in the twentieth century. As of 2023, the population stood at just 66.

== See also ==
- Communes of the Yonne department
