= Lichères-près-Aigremont =

- Commune
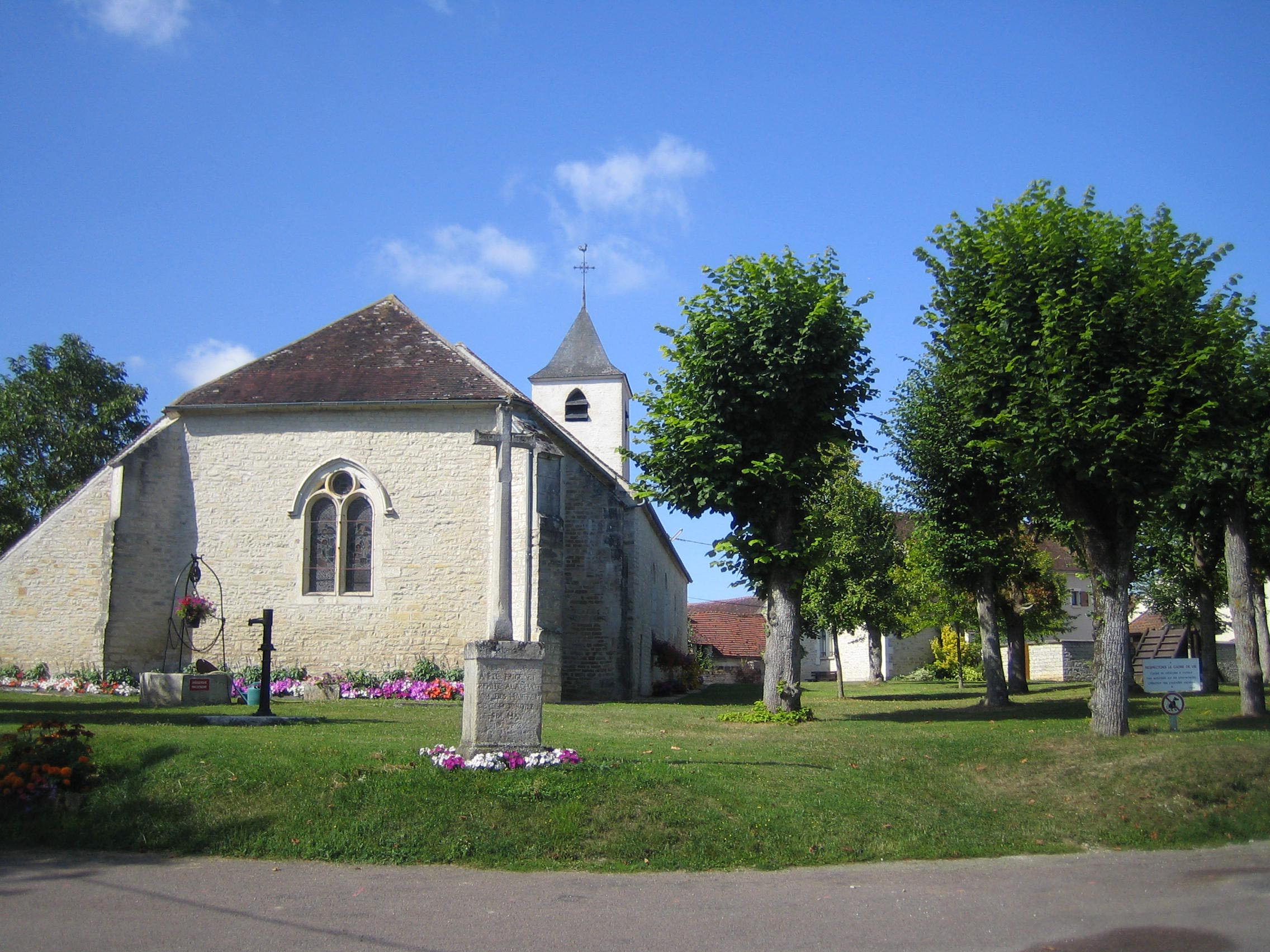
- The church in Lichères

- Coat of arms
- Location of Lichères-près-Aigremont
- Location within France Location within Bourgogne-Franche-Comté
- Coordinates: 47°43′43″N 3°51′22″E
- Country: France
- Region: Bourgogne-Franche-Comté
- Department: Yonne
- Arrondissement: Auxerre
- Canton: Chablis

Government
  - Mayor (2020–2026): Olivier Farama
- Area^{1}: 16.37 km^{2} (6.32 sq mi)
- Highest elevation: 264 m (866 ft)
- Lowest elevation: 165 m (541 ft)
- Population (2023): 154
  - Density: 9.41/km^{2} (24.4/sq mi)
- Time zone: UTC+01:00 (CET)
  - Summer (DST): UTC+02:00 (CEST)
- INSEE/Postal code: 89224 /89800
- ^{1} French Land Register data, which excludes lakes, ponds, glaciers > 1 km^{2} (0.386 sq mi or 247 acres) and river estuaries.

Lichères-près-Aigremont (French pronunciation: [liʃɛʁ pʁɛ ɛɡʁəmɔ̃], literally Lichères near Aigremont) is a commune in the Yonne department in Bourgogne-Franche-Comté in north-central France.

== See also ==
- Communes of the Yonne department
