= Chemilly =

Chemilly may refer to the following places in France:

- Chemilly, Allier, a commune in the department of Allier
- Chemilly, Haute-Saône, a commune in the department of Haute-Saône
- Chemilly-sur-Serein, a commune in the department of Yonne
- Chemilly-sur-Yonne, a commune in the department of Yonne
