= Vassy =

Vassy may refer to:

- Arlette Vassy (1913-2000), French geophysicist
- Vassy, Calvados, a former commune in Valdallière, Calvados département, Normandy region, France
- Vassy-sous-Pisy, formerly Vassy, a commune in the Yonne département, France
- Vassy (singer) (born 1983), Australian singer, songwriter, and producer
- Vassy Kapelos (born 1981), Canadian political journalist
- Kin Vassy (1943–1994), American singer-songwriter

== See also ==
- Wassy, formerly Wassy-sur-Blaise, a commune in Haute-Marne, France
