= Blacy =

Blacy is the name of the following communes in France:

- Blacy, Marne, in the Marne department
- Blacy, Yonne, in the Yonne department
