= Thizy =

Thizy may refer to:

- Thizy, Rhône, a commune in the French region of Rhône-Alpes
- Thizy, Yonne, a commune in the French region of Bourgogne
