= Censy =

- Commune
- Location of Censy
- Location within France Location within Bourgogne-Franche-Comté
- Coordinates: 47°41′51″N 4°02′33″E
- Country: France
- Region: Bourgogne-Franche-Comté
- Department: Yonne
- Arrondissement: Avallon
- Canton: Chablis

Government
  - Mayor (2020–2026): Philippe Deschaumes
- Area^{1}: 4.86 km^{2} (1.88 sq mi)
- Highest elevation: 309 m (1,014 ft)
- Lowest elevation: 228 m (748 ft)
- Population (2023): 51
  - Density: 10/km^{2} (27/sq mi)
- Time zone: UTC+01:00 (CET)
  - Summer (DST): UTC+02:00 (CEST)
- INSEE/Postal code: 89064 /89310
- ^{1} French Land Register data, which excludes lakes, ponds, glaciers > 1 km^{2} (0.386 sq mi or 247 acres) and river estuaries.

Censy (French pronunciation: [sɑ̃si]) is a commune in the Yonne department in Bourgogne-Franche-Comté in north-central France.

== See also ==
- Communes of the Yonne department
