= Angely, Yonne =

Angely
- Commune
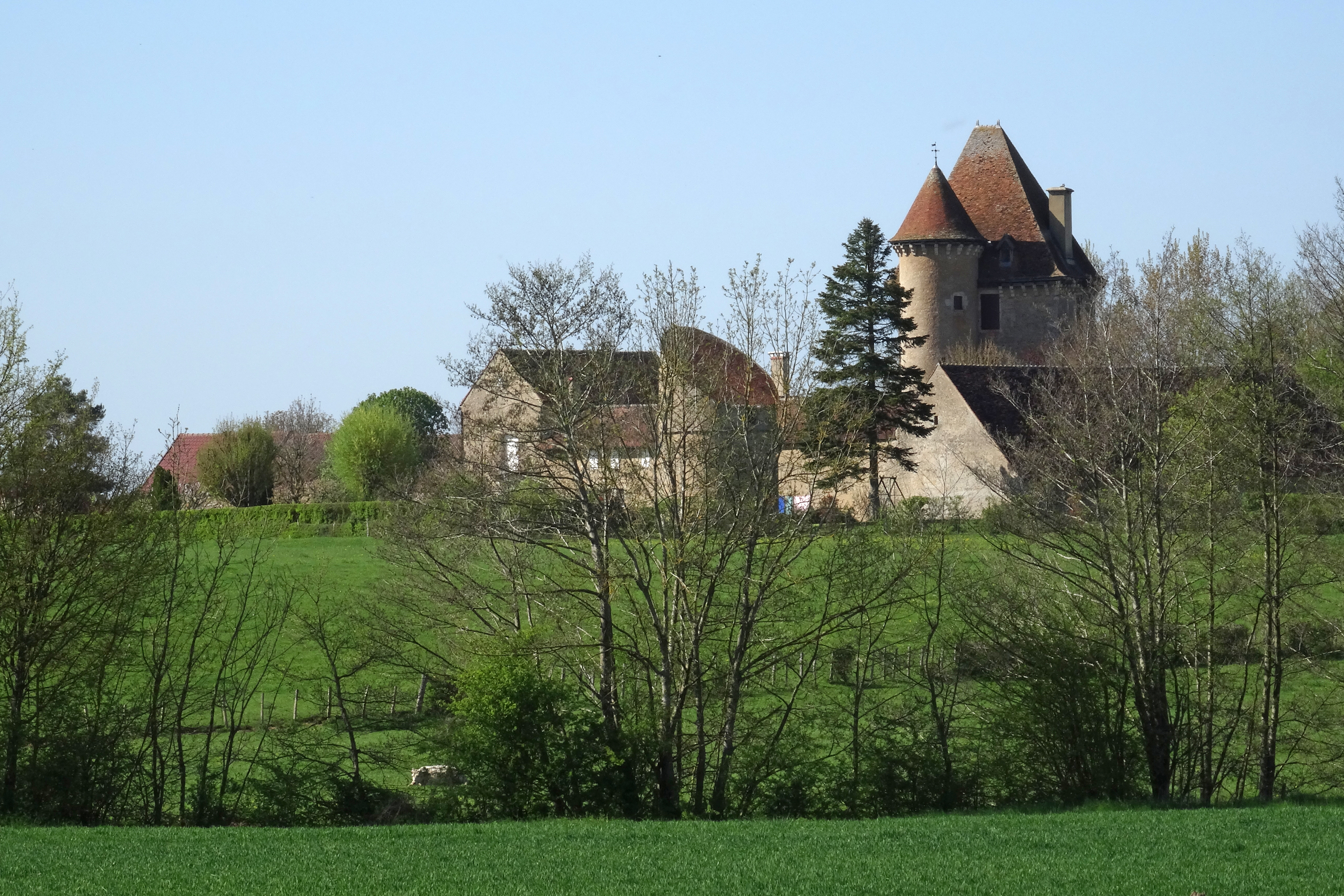
- The tower of Pancy in Angely
- Location of Angely
- Location within France Location within Bourgogne-Franche-Comté
- Coordinates: 47°33′56″N 4°01′19″E
- Country: France
- Region: Bourgogne-Franche-Comté
- Department: Yonne
- Arrondissement: Avallon
- Canton: Chablis
- Intercommunality: Serein

Government
  - Mayor (2020–2026): Philippe Trespalle
- Area^{1}: 8.62 km^{2} (3.33 sq mi)
- Highest elevation: 262 m (860 ft)
- Lowest elevation: 192 m (630 ft)
- Population (2023): 152
  - Density: 17.6/km^{2} (45.7/sq mi)
- Time zone: UTC+01:00 (CET)
  - Summer (DST): UTC+02:00 (CEST)
- INSEE/Postal code: 89008 /89440
- ^{1} French Land Register data, which excludes lakes, ponds, glaciers > 1 km^{2} (0.386 sq mi or 247 acres) and river estuaries.

Angely is a commune in the Yonne department in Bourgogne-Franche-Comté in north-central France.

== See also ==
- Communes of the Yonne department
