= Ligny-le-Châtel =

- Commune
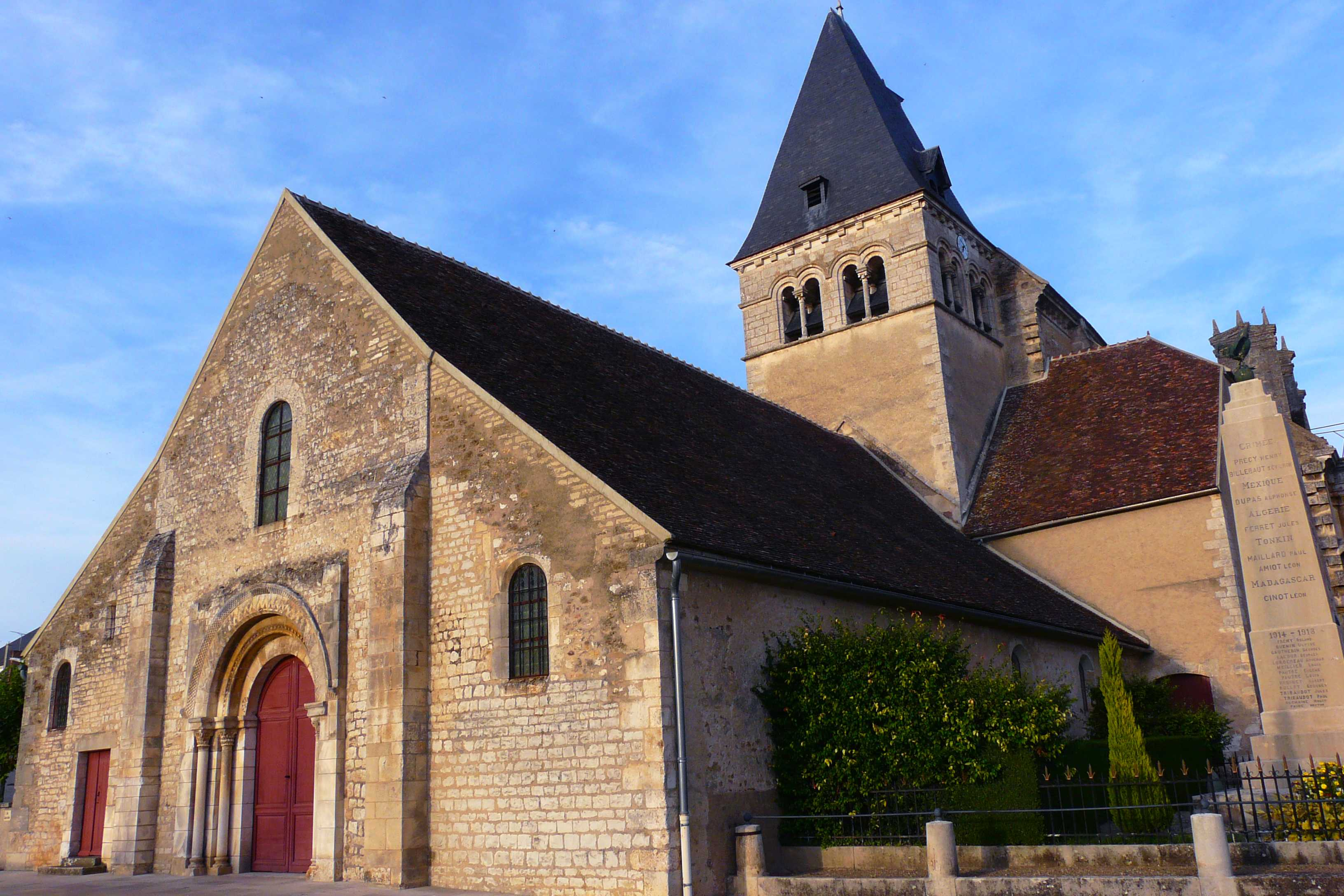
- The church in Ligny-le-Châtel

- Coat of arms
- Location of Ligny-le-Châtel
- Location within France Location within Bourgogne-Franche-Comté
- Coordinates: 47°54′05″N 3°45′27″E
- Country: France
- Region: Bourgogne-Franche-Comté
- Department: Yonne
- Arrondissement: Auxerre
- Canton: Chablis
- Intercommunality: Chablis Villages et Terroirs

Government
  - Mayor (2020–2026): Chantal Royer
- Area^{1}: 27.48 km^{2} (10.61 sq mi)
- Highest elevation: 182 m (597 ft)
- Lowest elevation: 103 m (338 ft)
- Population (2023): 1,200
  - Density: 44/km^{2} (110/sq mi)
- Time zone: UTC+01:00 (CET)
  - Summer (DST): UTC+02:00 (CEST)
- INSEE/Postal code: 89227 /89144
- ^{1} French Land Register data, which excludes lakes, ponds, glaciers > 1 km^{2} (0.386 sq mi or 247 acres) and river estuaries.

Ligny-le-Châtel (French pronunciation: [liɲi lə ʃɑtɛl]) is a commune in the Yonne department in Bourgogne-Franche-Comté in north-central France.

== Population ==
Historical population
Year	Pop.	±% p.a.
1968	962	—
1975	1,027	+0.94%
1982	1,010	−0.24%
1990	1,122	+1.32%
1999	1,289	+1.55%
2007	1,314	+0.24%
2012	1,340	+0.39%
2017	1,280	−0.91%
2023	1,200	−1.07%
Source: INSEE

== See also ==
- Communes of the Yonne department
