= Carisey =

- Commune
- Coat of arms
- Location of Carisey
- Location within France Location within Bourgogne-Franche-Comté
- Coordinates: 47°55′27″N 3°50′52″E
- Country: France
- Region: Bourgogne-Franche-Comté
- Department: Yonne
- Arrondissement: Auxerre
- Canton: Chablis

Government
  - Mayor (2020–2026): Pascal Etchart
- Area^{1}: 11.29 km^{2} (4.36 sq mi)
- Highest elevation: 193 m (633 ft)
- Lowest elevation: 121 m (397 ft)
- Population (2023): 377
  - Density: 33.4/km^{2} (86.5/sq mi)
- Time zone: UTC+01:00 (CET)
  - Summer (DST): UTC+02:00 (CEST)
- INSEE/Postal code: 89062 /89360
- ^{1} French Land Register data, which excludes lakes, ponds, glaciers > 1 km^{2} (0.386 sq mi or 247 acres) and river estuaries.

Carisey (French pronunciation: [kaʁizɛ]) is a commune in the Yonne department in Bourgogne-Franche-Comté in north-central France.

== See also ==
- Communes of the Yonne department
