= Béru =

- Commune
- Coat of arms
- Location of Béru
- Location within France Location within Bourgogne-Franche-Comté
- Coordinates: 47°48′06″N 3°53′27″E
- Country: France
- Region: Bourgogne-Franche-Comté
- Department: Yonne
- Arrondissement: Auxerre
- Canton: Chablis

Government
  - Mayor (2020–2026): Sébastien Podor
- Area^{1}: 5.17 km^{2} (2.00 sq mi)
- Highest elevation: 326 m (1,070 ft)
- Lowest elevation: 168 m (551 ft)
- Population (2023): 75
  - Density: 15/km^{2} (38/sq mi)
- Time zone: UTC+01:00 (CET)
  - Summer (DST): UTC+02:00 (CEST)
- INSEE/Postal code: 89039 /89700
- ^{1} French Land Register data, which excludes lakes, ponds, glaciers > 1 km^{2} (0.386 sq mi or 247 acres) and river estuaries.

Béru (French pronunciation: [beʁy]) is a commune in the Yonne department in Bourgogne-Franche-Comté in north-central France.

== See also ==
- Communes of the Yonne department
