= L'Isle-sur-Serein =

- Commune
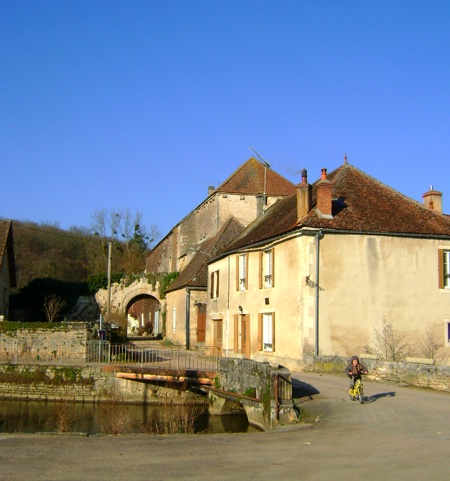
- The chateau gate in L'Isle-sur-Serein

- Coat of arms
- Location of L'Isle-sur-Serein
- Location within France Location within Bourgogne-Franche-Comté
- Coordinates: 47°35′18″N 4°00′19″E
- Country: France
- Region: Bourgogne-Franche-Comté
- Department: Yonne
- Arrondissement: Avallon
- Canton: Chablis

Government
  - Mayor (2020–2026): Stéphane Morel
- Area^{1}: 4.44 km^{2} (1.71 sq mi)
- Highest elevation: 298 m (978 ft)
- Lowest elevation: 192 m (630 ft)
- Population (2023): 666
  - Density: 150/km^{2} (388/sq mi)
- Time zone: UTC+01:00 (CET)
  - Summer (DST): UTC+02:00 (CEST)
- INSEE/Postal code: 89204 /89440
- ^{1} French Land Register data, which excludes lakes, ponds, glaciers > 1 km^{2} (0.386 sq mi or 247 acres) and river estuaries.

L'Isle-sur-Serein (French pronunciation: [lil syʁ səʁɛ̃], literally L'Isle on Serein) is a commune in the Yonne department in Bourgogne-Franche-Comté in north-central France.

== See also ==
- Communes of the Yonne department
