= Fresnes, Yonne =

Fresnes
- Commune
- Location of Fresnes
- Location within France Location within Bourgogne-Franche-Comté
- Coordinates: 47°45′42″N 3°59′38″E
- Country: France
- Region: Bourgogne-Franche-Comté
- Department: Yonne
- Arrondissement: Avallon
- Canton: Chablis

Government
  - Mayor (2020–2026): Hervé Pascault
- Area^{1}: 4.97 km^{2} (1.92 sq mi)
- Highest elevation: 254 m (833 ft)
- Lowest elevation: 187 m (614 ft)
- Population (2023): 61
  - Density: 12/km^{2} (32/sq mi)
- Time zone: UTC+01:00 (CET)
  - Summer (DST): UTC+02:00 (CEST)
- INSEE/Postal code: 89183 /89310
- ^{1} French Land Register data, which excludes lakes, ponds, glaciers > 1 km^{2} (0.386 sq mi or 247 acres) and river estuaries.

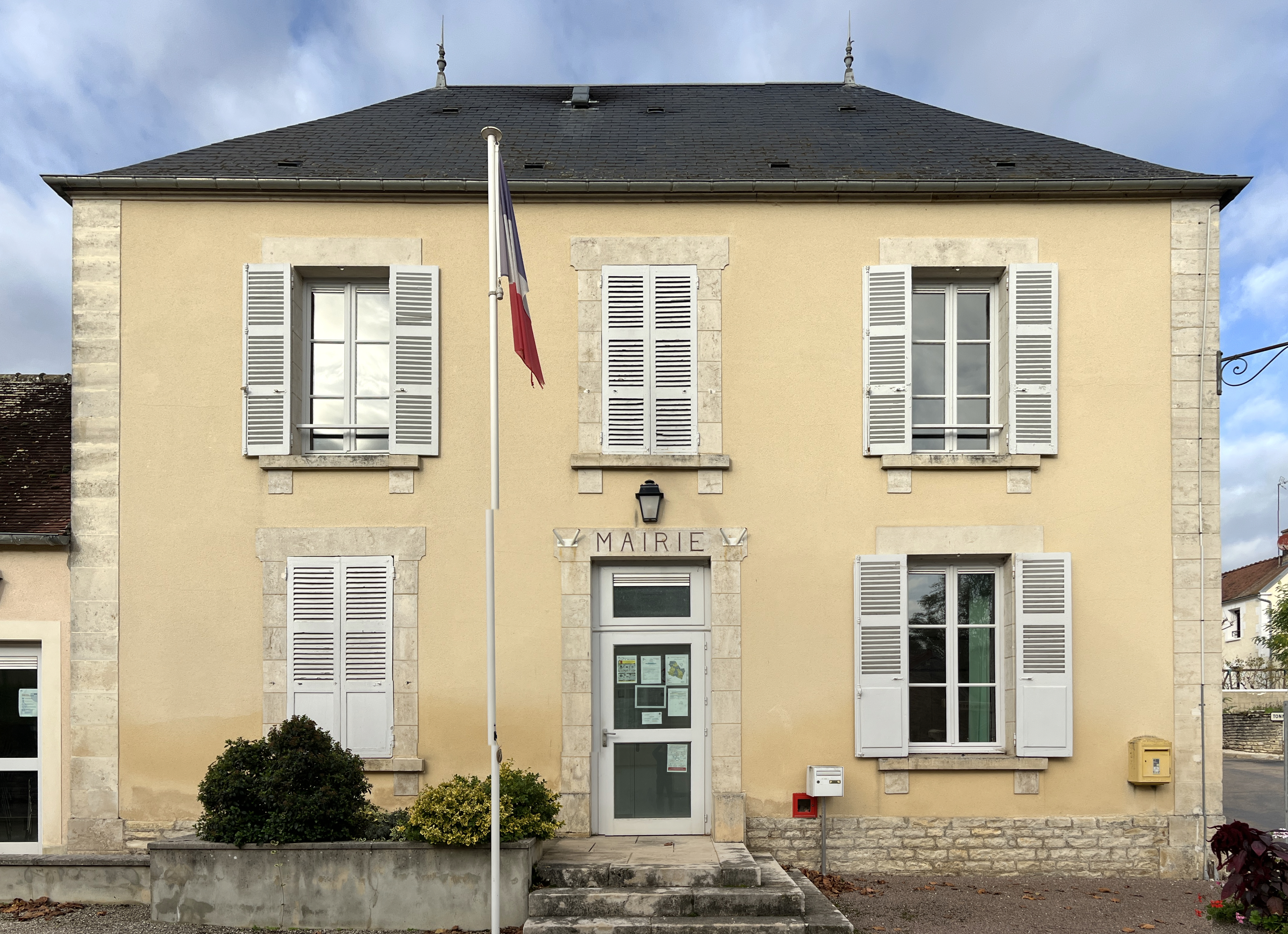
Fresnes Town Hall, Yonne

Fresnes (French pronunciation: [fʁɛn]) is a commune in the Yonne department in Bourgogne-Franche-Comté in north-central France.

== See also ==
- Communes of the Yonne department
