= Fontenay-près-Chablis =

- Commune
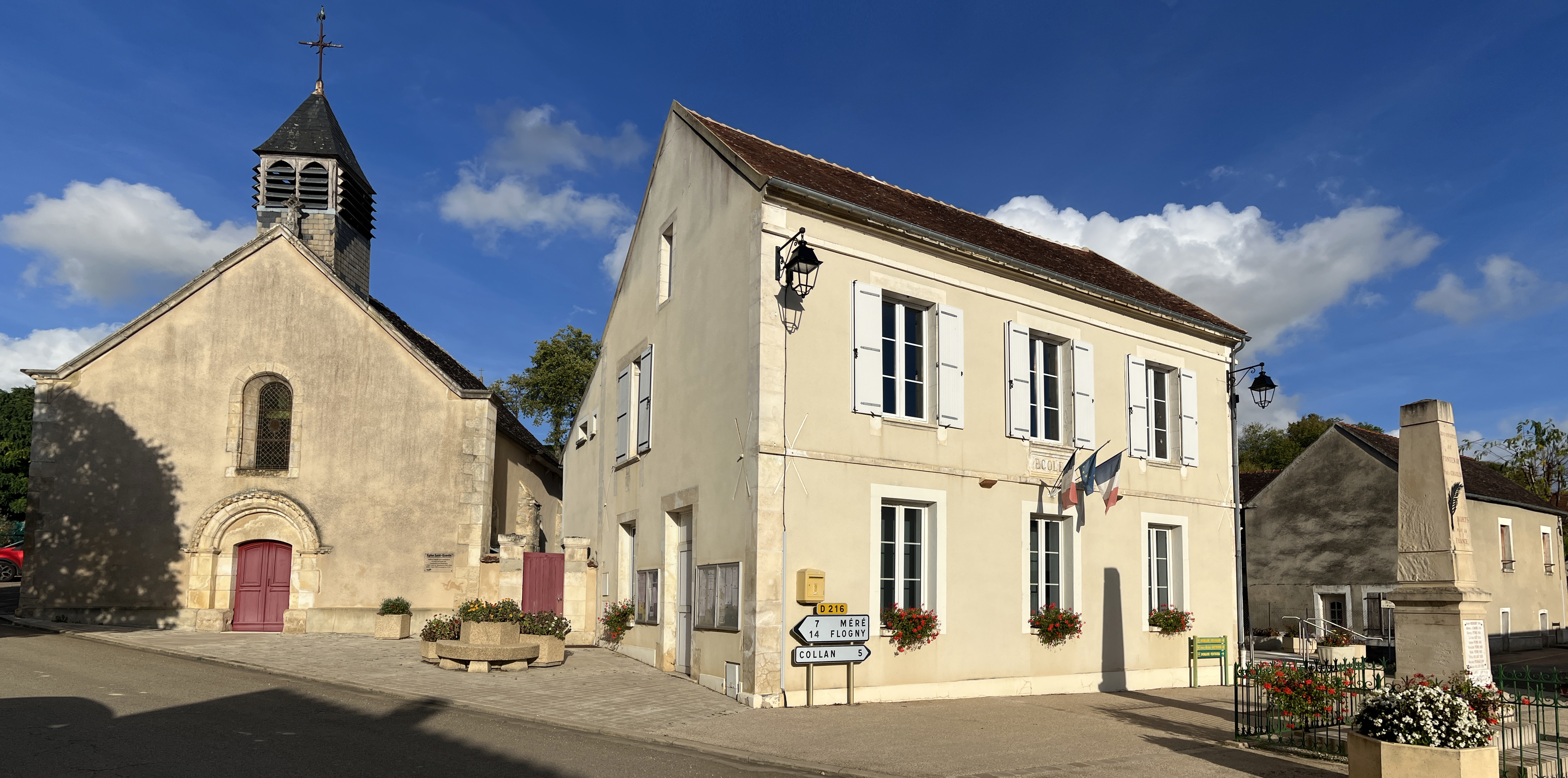
- Fontenay-près-Chablis Town hall

- Coat of arms
- Location of Fontenay-près-Chablis
- Location within France Location within Bourgogne-Franche-Comté
- Coordinates: 47°50′52″N 3°48′42″E
- Country: France
- Region: Bourgogne-Franche-Comté
- Department: Yonne
- Arrondissement: Auxerre
- Canton: Chablis

Government
  - Mayor (2020–2026): Thierry Mothe
- Area^{1}: 5.05 km^{2} (1.95 sq mi)
- Highest elevation: 257 m (843 ft)
- Lowest elevation: 143 m (469 ft)
- Population (2023): 134
  - Density: 26.5/km^{2} (68.7/sq mi)
- Time zone: UTC+01:00 (CET)
  - Summer (DST): UTC+02:00 (CEST)
- INSEE/Postal code: 89175 /89800
- ^{1} French Land Register data, which excludes lakes, ponds, glaciers > 1 km^{2} (0.386 sq mi or 247 acres) and river estuaries.

Fontenay-près-Chablis (French pronunciation: [fɔ̃tnɛ pʁɛ ʃabli], literally Fontenay near Chablis) is a commune in the Yonne department in Bourgogne-Franche-Comté in north-central France.

== See also ==
- Communes of the Yonne department
