= Massangis =

- Commune
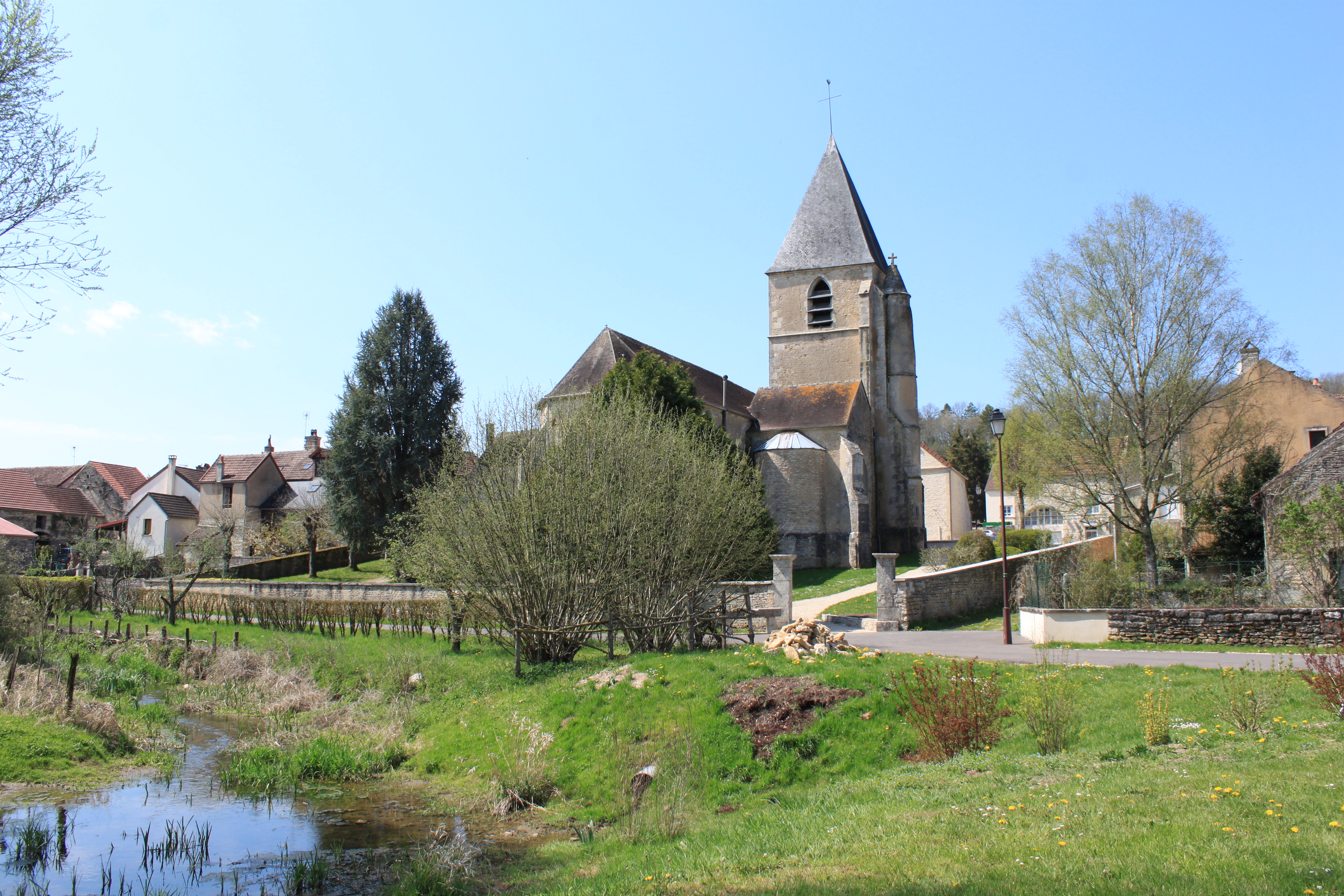
- The church in Massangis
- Location of Massangis
- Location within France Location within Bourgogne-Franche-Comté
- Coordinates: 47°37′33″N 3°58′29″E
- Country: France
- Region: Bourgogne-Franche-Comté
- Department: Yonne
- Arrondissement: Avallon
- Canton: Chablis
- Area^{1}: 43.35 km^{2} (16.74 sq mi)
- Highest elevation: 330 m (1,080 ft)
- Lowest elevation: 182 m (597 ft)
- Population (2023): 332
  - Density: 7.66/km^{2} (19.8/sq mi)
- Time zone: UTC+01:00 (CET)
  - Summer (DST): UTC+02:00 (CEST)
- INSEE/Postal code: 89246 /89440
- ^{1} French Land Register data, which excludes lakes, ponds, glaciers > 1 km^{2} (0.386 sq mi or 247 acres) and river estuaries.

Massangis is a commune in the Yonne department in Bourgogne-Franche-Comté in north-central France.

== See also ==
- Communes of the Yonne department
