= Sarry, Yonne =

Sarry
- Commune
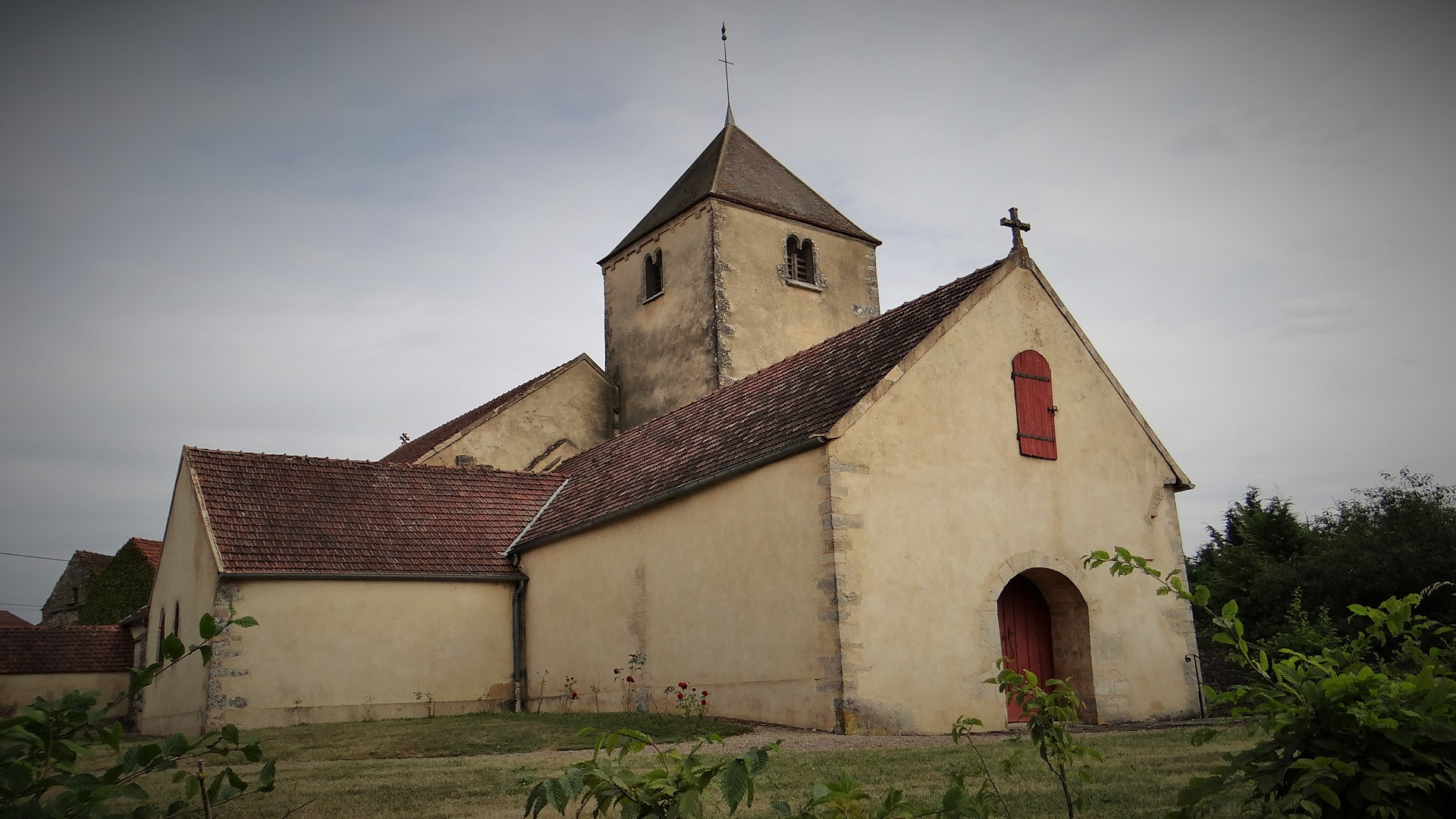
- The church in Sarry
- Location of Sarry
- Location within France Location within Bourgogne-Franche-Comté
- Coordinates: 47°40′11″N 4°04′26″E
- Country: France
- Region: Bourgogne-Franche-Comté
- Department: Yonne
- Arrondissement: Avallon
- Canton: Chablis

Government
  - Mayor (2020–2026): Christian Lardin
- Area^{1}: 25.64 km^{2} (9.90 sq mi)
- Highest elevation: 332 m (1,089 ft)
- Lowest elevation: 207 m (679 ft)
- Population (2023): 133
  - Density: 5.19/km^{2} (13.4/sq mi)
- Time zone: UTC+01:00 (CET)
  - Summer (DST): UTC+02:00 (CEST)
- INSEE/Postal code: 89376 /89310
- ^{1} French Land Register data, which excludes lakes, ponds, glaciers > 1 km^{2} (0.386 sq mi or 247 acres) and river estuaries.

Sarry (French pronunciation: [saʁi]) is a commune in the Yonne département in Bourgogne-Franche-Comté in north-central France.

== History ==
At the beginning of the 20th century, a Merovingian tomb was discovered at a place called Antonnay.

Sarry is an ancient fortified village. In the 11th and 12th centuries, it was part of the seigneury of Montréal, with the exception of a portion of land belonging to the abbey of Moutiers-Saint-Jean, part of the diocese of Langres.

In the mid-11th century, as a result of an alliance with the lords of Montréal, this land passed into the House of Maligny, and was then given as a dowry to Anseau de Trainel, lord of Soligny-les-Etangs, who sold it with its outbuildings in 1296 to Robert, Duke of Burgundy.

The abbeys of Pontigny and Vausse also owned property there. Sarry's parish church dates back to the 13th century. It was listed as a historic monument in 1929. The Soulangy chapel dates from the 16th century. According to Courtépée in the 18th century, the woods belonged to the king.

== See also ==
- Communes of the Yonne department
