= Préhy =

- Commune
- Coat of arms
- Location of Préhy
- Location within France Location within Bourgogne-Franche-Comté
- Coordinates: 47°45′34″N 3°45′31″E
- Country: France
- Region: Bourgogne-Franche-Comté
- Department: Yonne
- Arrondissement: Auxerre
- Canton: Chablis

Government
  - Mayor (2020–2026): Marc Schaller
- Area^{1}: 14.00 km^{2} (5.41 sq mi)
- Highest elevation: 312 m (1,024 ft)
- Lowest elevation: 152 m (499 ft)
- Population (2023): 157
  - Density: 11.2/km^{2} (29.0/sq mi)
- Time zone: UTC+01:00 (CET)
  - Summer (DST): UTC+02:00 (CEST)
- INSEE/Postal code: 89315 /89800
- ^{1} French Land Register data, which excludes lakes, ponds, glaciers > 1 km^{2} (0.386 sq mi or 247 acres) and river estuaries.

Préhy (French pronunciation: [pʁe.i]) is a commune in the Yonne department in Bourgogne-Franche-Comté in north-central France.

== See also ==
- Communes of the Yonne department
