= Pasilly =

- Commune
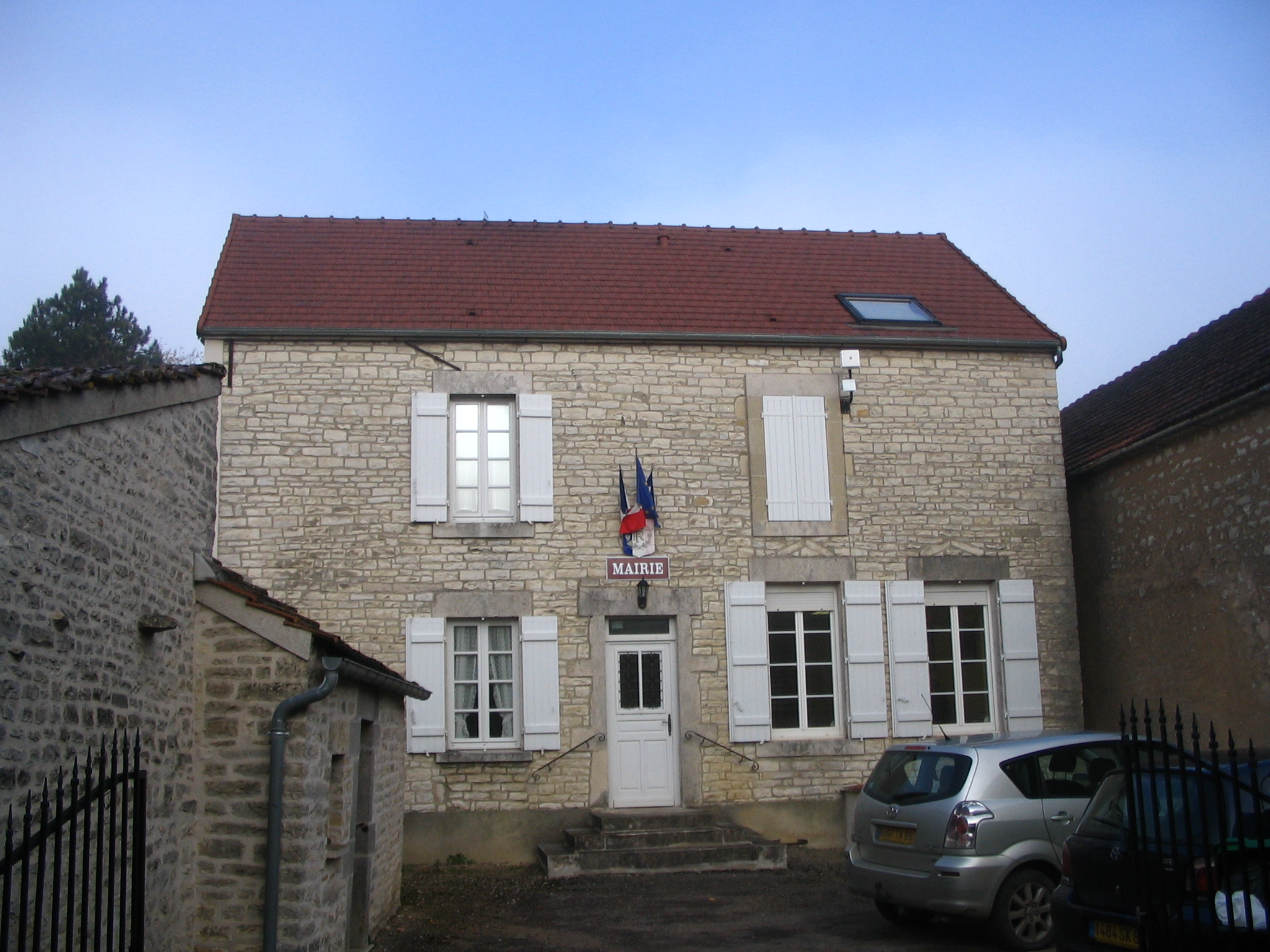
- The town hall in Pasilly
- Location of Pasilly
- Location within France Location within Bourgogne-Franche-Comté
- Coordinates: 47°41′53″N 4°04′43″E
- Country: France
- Region: Bourgogne-Franche-Comté
- Department: Yonne
- Arrondissement: Avallon
- Canton: Chablis
- Area^{1}: 9.99 km^{2} (3.86 sq mi)
- Highest elevation: 315 m (1,033 ft)
- Lowest elevation: 250 m (820 ft)
- Population (2023): 54
  - Density: 5.4/km^{2} (14/sq mi)
- Time zone: UTC+01:00 (CET)
  - Summer (DST): UTC+02:00 (CEST)
- INSEE/Postal code: 89290 /89310
- ^{1} French Land Register data, which excludes lakes, ponds, glaciers > 1 km^{2} (0.386 sq mi or 247 acres) and river estuaries.

Pasilly (French pronunciation: [paziji]) is a commune in the Yonne department in Bourgogne-Franche-Comté in north-central France.

== See also ==
- Communes of the Yonne department
