= Chichée =

- Commune
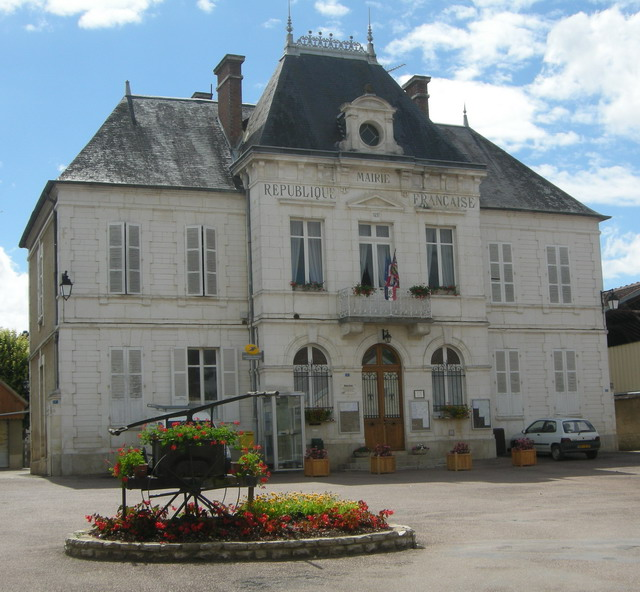
- The town hall in Chichée

- Coat of arms
- Location of Chichée
- Location within France Location within Bourgogne-Franche-Comté
- Coordinates: 47°47′37″N 3°50′07″E
- Country: France
- Region: Bourgogne-Franche-Comté
- Department: Yonne
- Arrondissement: Auxerre
- Canton: Chablis

Government
  - Mayor (2022–2026): Franck Laroche
- Area^{1}: 18.78 km^{2} (7.25 sq mi)
- Highest elevation: 289 m (948 ft)
- Lowest elevation: 133 m (436 ft)
- Population (2023): 297
  - Density: 15.8/km^{2} (41.0/sq mi)
- Time zone: UTC+01:00 (CET)
  - Summer (DST): UTC+02:00 (CEST)
- INSEE/Postal code: 89104 /89800
- ^{1} French Land Register data, which excludes lakes, ponds, glaciers > 1 km^{2} (0.386 sq mi or 247 acres) and river estuaries.

Chichée (French pronunciation: [ʃiʃe]) is a commune in the Yonne department in Bourgogne-Franche-Comté in north-central France.

== See also ==
- Communes of the Yonne department
