= Venouse =

- Commune
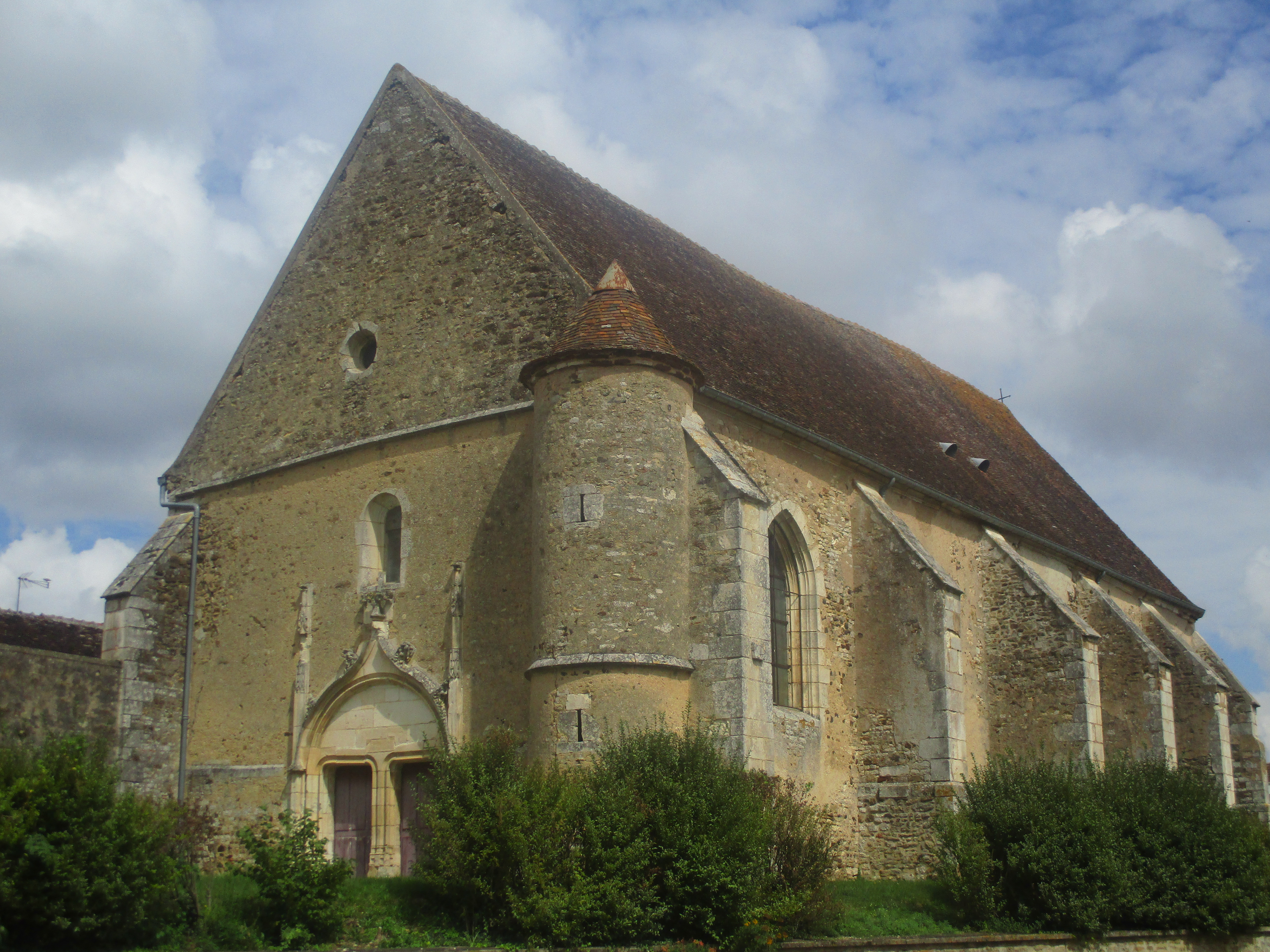
- The church in Venouse
- Location of Venouse
- Location within France Location within Bourgogne-Franche-Comté
- Coordinates: 47°53′46″N 3°41′01″E
- Country: France
- Region: Bourgogne-Franche-Comté
- Department: Yonne
- Arrondissement: Auxerre
- Canton: Chablis

Government
  - Mayor (2020–2026): Raymond Degryse
- Area^{1}: 7.91 km^{2} (3.05 sq mi)
- Highest elevation: 181 m (594 ft)
- Lowest elevation: 104 m (341 ft)
- Population (2023): 288
  - Density: 36.4/km^{2} (94.3/sq mi)
- Time zone: UTC+01:00 (CET)
  - Summer (DST): UTC+02:00 (CEST)
- INSEE/Postal code: 89437 /89230
- ^{1} French Land Register data, which excludes lakes, ponds, glaciers > 1 km^{2} (0.386 sq mi or 247 acres) and river estuaries.

Venouse (French pronunciation: [vənuz]) is a commune in the Yonne department in Bourgogne-Franche-Comté in north-central France.

== See also ==
- Communes of the Yonne department
