= Lignorelles =

- Commune
- Coat of arms
- Location of Lignorelles
- Location within France Location within Bourgogne-Franche-Comté
- Coordinates: 47°51′50″N 3°43′42″E
- Country: France
- Region: Bourgogne-Franche-Comté
- Department: Yonne
- Arrondissement: Auxerre
- Canton: Chablis
- Intercommunality: Chablis Villages et Terroirs

Government
  - Mayor (2020–2026): Marlène Pautré
- Area^{1}: 11.55 km^{2} (4.46 sq mi)
- Highest elevation: 256 m (840 ft)
- Lowest elevation: 139 m (456 ft)
- Population (2023): 185
  - Density: 16.0/km^{2} (41.5/sq mi)
- Time zone: UTC+01:00 (CET)
  - Summer (DST): UTC+02:00 (CEST)
- INSEE/Postal code: 89226 /89800
- ^{1} French Land Register data, which excludes lakes, ponds, glaciers > 1 km^{2} (0.386 sq mi or 247 acres) and river estuaries.

Lignorelles (French pronunciation: [liɲɔʁɛl]) is a commune in the Yonne department in Bourgogne-Franche-Comté in north-central France.

== Population ==
Historical population
Year	Pop.	±% p.a.
1968	201	—
1975	187	−1.03%
1982	164	−1.86%
1990	149	−1.19%
1999	178	+2.00%
2007	168	−0.72%
2012	182	+1.61%
2017	192	+1.08%
2023	185	−0.62%
Source: INSEE

== See also ==
- Communes of the Yonne department
