= Étivey =

- Commune
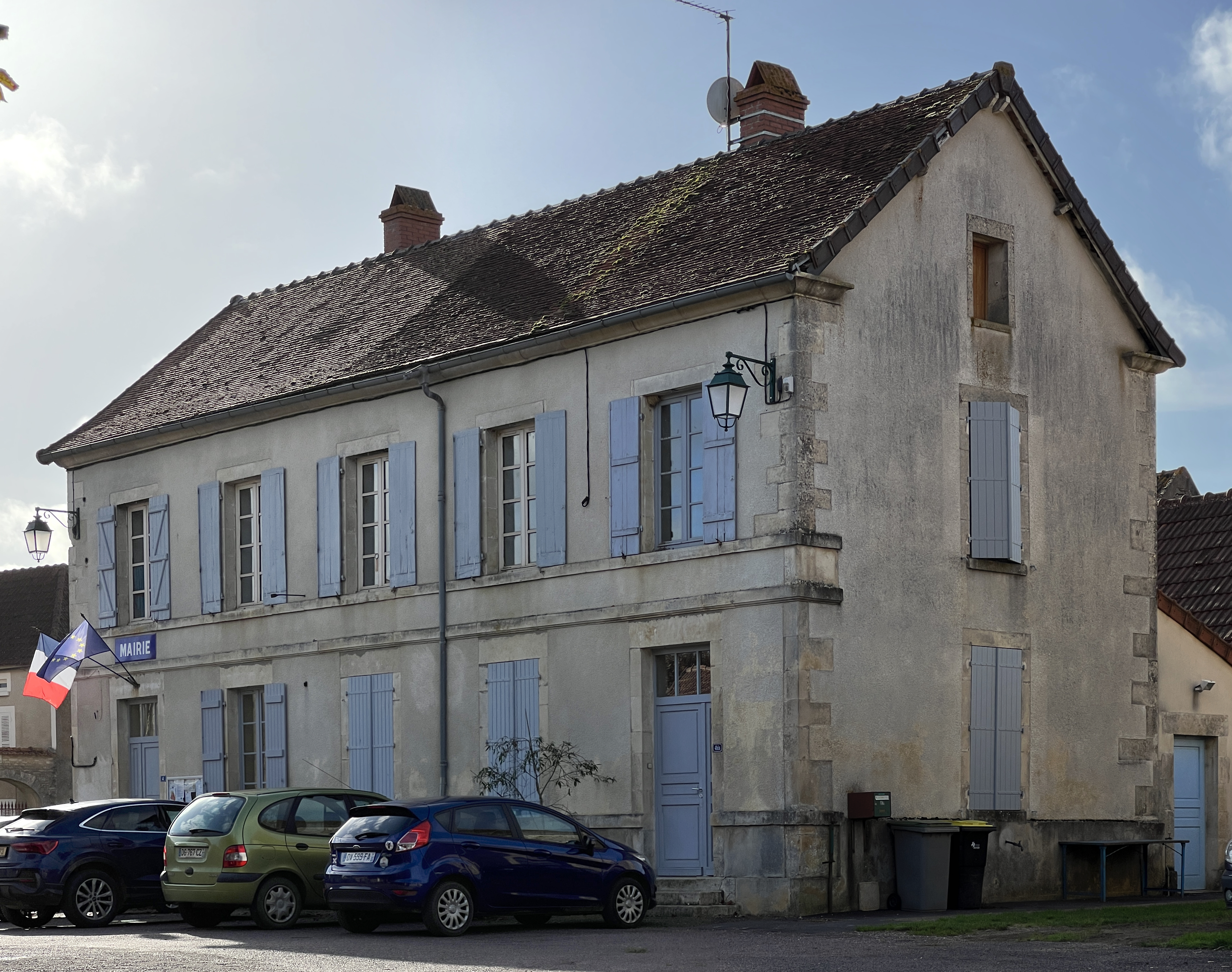
- Étivey Town hall
- Location of Étivey
- Location within France Location within Bourgogne-Franche-Comté
- Coordinates: 47°40′43″N 4°08′41″E
- Country: France
- Region: Bourgogne-Franche-Comté
- Department: Yonne
- Arrondissement: Avallon
- Canton: Chablis

Government
  - Mayor (2020–2026): Gilles Sackepey
- Area^{1}: 28.02 km^{2} (10.82 sq mi)
- Highest elevation: 342 m (1,122 ft)
- Lowest elevation: 205 m (673 ft)
- Population (2023): 181
  - Density: 6.46/km^{2} (16.7/sq mi)
- Time zone: UTC+01:00 (CET)
  - Summer (DST): UTC+02:00 (CEST)
- INSEE/Postal code: 89161 /89310
- ^{1} French Land Register data, which excludes lakes, ponds, glaciers > 1 km^{2} (0.386 sq mi or 247 acres) and river estuaries.

Étivey (French pronunciation: [etivɛ]) is a commune in the Yonne department in Bourgogne-Franche-Comté in north-central France.

== See also ==
- Communes of the Yonne department
