= Nitry =

- Commune
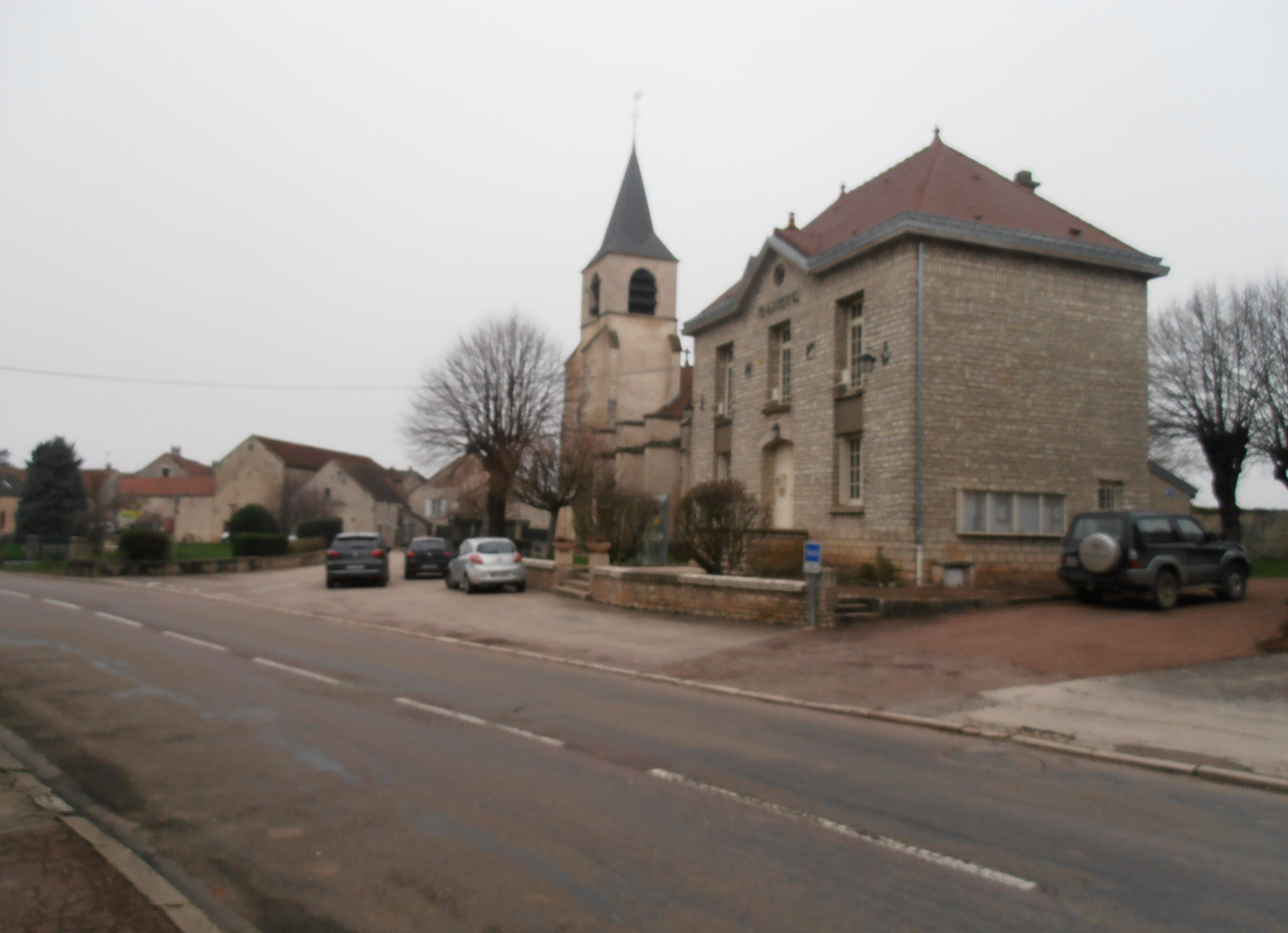
- The church in Nitry
- Location of Nitry
- Location within France Location within Bourgogne-Franche-Comté
- Coordinates: 47°40′22″N 3°52′46″E
- Country: France
- Region: Bourgogne-Franche-Comté
- Department: Yonne
- Arrondissement: Auxerre
- Canton: Chablis

Government
  - Mayor (2020–2026): Jacqueline Perret
- Area^{1}: 34.70 km^{2} (13.40 sq mi)
- Highest elevation: 276 m (906 ft)
- Lowest elevation: 180 m (590 ft)
- Population (2023): 372
  - Density: 10.7/km^{2} (27.8/sq mi)
- Time zone: UTC+01:00 (CET)
  - Summer (DST): UTC+02:00 (CEST)
- INSEE/Postal code: 89277 /89310
- ^{1} French Land Register data, which excludes lakes, ponds, glaciers > 1 km^{2} (0.386 sq mi or 247 acres) and river estuaries.

Nitry (French pronunciation: [nitʁi]) is a commune in the Yonne department in Bourgogne-Franche-Comté in north-central France.

== See also ==
- Communes of the Yonne department
