= Canton of Chablis =

Coordinates: 47.81°N 3.80°E

The canton of Chablis is an administrative division of the Yonne department, central France. Its borders were modified at the French canton reorganisation which came into effect in March 2015. Its seat is in Chablis.

It consists of the following communes:

1. Aigremont
2. Angely
3. Annay-sur-Serein
4. Annoux
5. Beine
6. Béru
7. Bierry-les-Belles-Fontaines
8. Blacy
9. Carisey
10. Censy
11. Chablis
12. La Chapelle-Vaupelteigne
13. Châtel-Gérard
14. Chemilly-sur-Serein
15. Chichée
16. Chitry
17. Courgis
18. Étivey
19. Fleys
20. Fontenay-près-Chablis
21. Fresnes
22. Grimault
23. Guillon-Terre-Plaine
24. L'Isle-sur-Serein
25. Jouancy
26. Lichères-près-Aigremont
27. Lignorelles
28. Ligny-le-Châtel
29. Maligny
30. Marmeaux
31. Massangis
32. Méré
33. Môlay
34. Montigny-la-Resle
35. Montréal
36. Moulins-en-Tonnerrois
37. Nitry
38. Noyers
39. Pasilly
40. Pisy
41. Poilly-sur-Serein
42. Pontigny
43. Préhy
44. Rouvray
45. Saint-André-en-Terre-Plaine
46. Saint-Cyr-les-Colons
47. Sainte-Vertu
48. Santigny
49. Sarry
50. Sauvigny-le-Beuréal
51. Savigny-en-Terre-Plaine
52. Talcy
53. Thizy
54. Varennes
55. Vassy-sous-Pisy
56. Venouse
57. Villeneuve-Saint-Salves
58. Villy
