= Fleys =

- Commune
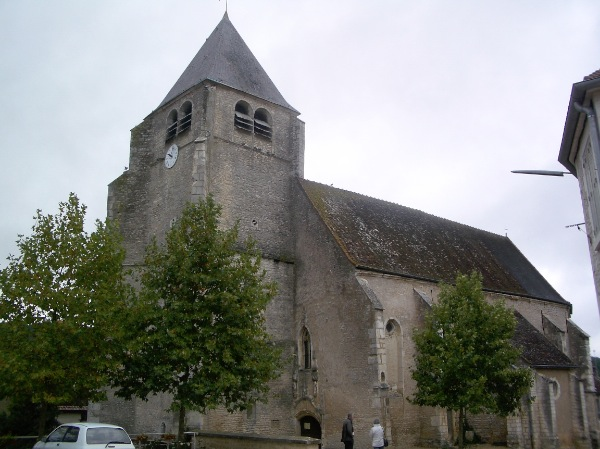
- The church in Fleys

- Coat of arms
- Location of Fleys
- Location within France Location within Bourgogne-Franche-Comté
- Coordinates: 47°48′54″N 3°51′44″E
- Country: France
- Region: Bourgogne-Franche-Comté
- Department: Yonne
- Arrondissement: Auxerre
- Canton: Chablis
- Area^{1}: 8.17 km^{2} (3.15 sq mi)
- Highest elevation: 316 m (1,037 ft)
- Lowest elevation: 146 m (479 ft)
- Population (2023): 164
  - Density: 20.1/km^{2} (52.0/sq mi)
- Time zone: UTC+01:00 (CET)
  - Summer (DST): UTC+02:00 (CEST)
- INSEE/Postal code: 89168 /89800
- ^{1} French Land Register data, which excludes lakes, ponds, glaciers > 1 km^{2} (0.386 sq mi or 247 acres) and river estuaries.

Fleys is a commune in the Yonne department in Bourgogne-Franche-Comté in north-central France.

== See also ==
- Communes of the Yonne department
