= Grimault =

- Commune
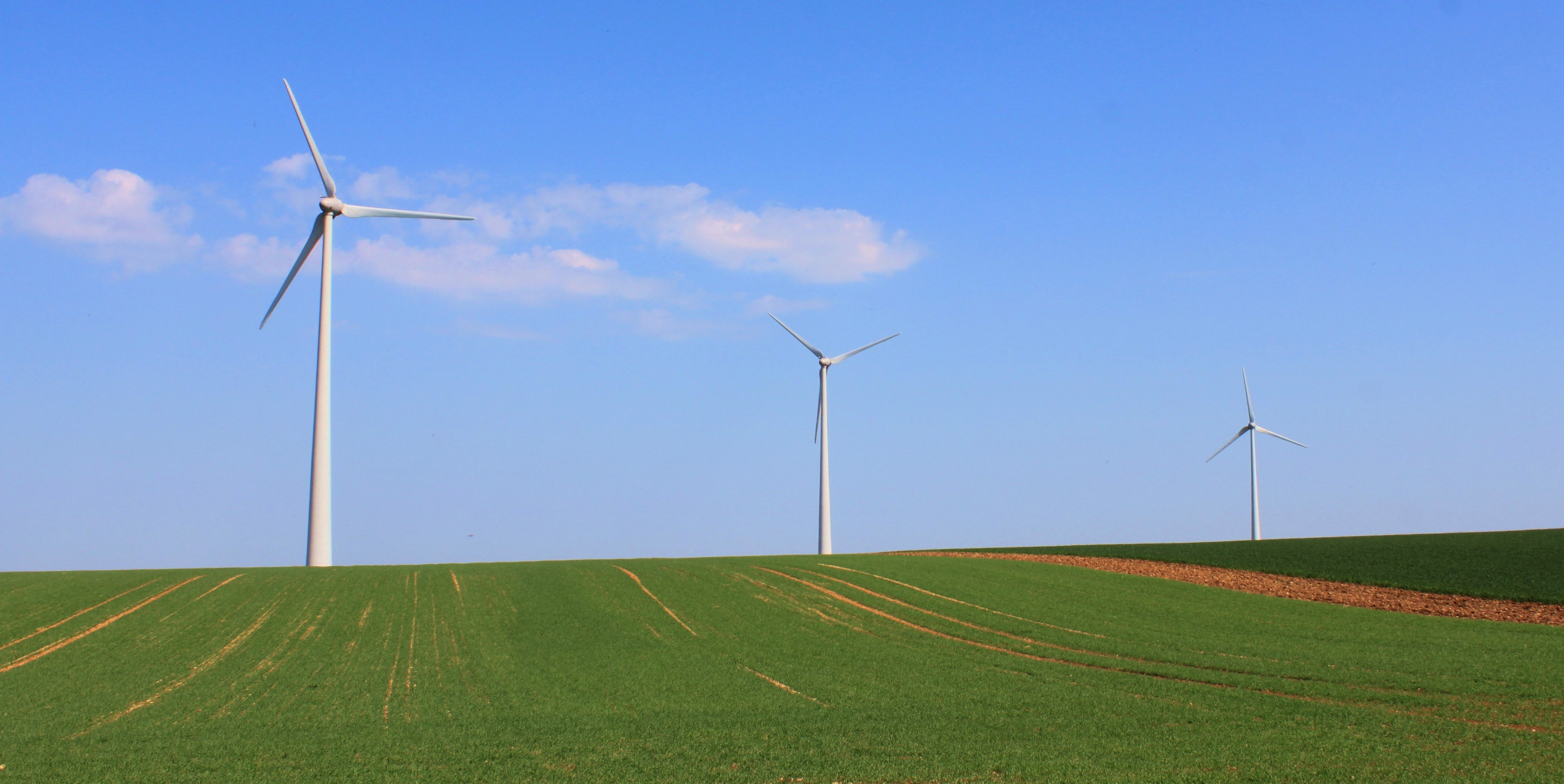
- The wind farm in Grimault
- Location of Grimault
- Location within France Location within Bourgogne-Franche-Comté
- Coordinates: 47°39′09″N 3°59′16″E
- Country: France
- Region: Bourgogne-Franche-Comté
- Department: Yonne
- Arrondissement: Avallon
- Canton: Chablis
- Area^{1}: 23.77 km^{2} (9.18 sq mi)
- Highest elevation: 296 m (971 ft)
- Lowest elevation: 174 m (571 ft)
- Population (2023): 115
  - Density: 4.84/km^{2} (12.5/sq mi)
- Time zone: UTC+01:00 (CET)
  - Summer (DST): UTC+02:00 (CEST)
- INSEE/Postal code: 89194 /89310
- ^{1} French Land Register data, which excludes lakes, ponds, glaciers > 1 km^{2} (0.386 sq mi or 247 acres) and river estuaries.

Grimault (French pronunciation: [ɡʁimo]) is a commune in the Yonne department in Bourgogne-Franche-Comté in north-central France.

== See also ==
- Communes of the Yonne department
