= La Chapelle-Vaupelteigne =

- Commune
- Coat of arms
- Location of La Chapelle-Vaupelteigne
- Location within France Location within Bourgogne-Franche-Comté
- Coordinates: 47°50′48″N 3°45′59″E
- Country: France
- Region: Bourgogne-Franche-Comté
- Department: Yonne
- Arrondissement: Auxerre
- Canton: Chablis

Government
  - Mayor (2020–2026): Jean-Jacques Carré
- Area^{1}: 5.04 km^{2} (1.95 sq mi)
- Highest elevation: 252 m (827 ft)
- Lowest elevation: 122 m (400 ft)
- Population (2023): 88
  - Density: 17/km^{2} (45/sq mi)
- Time zone: UTC+01:00 (CET)
  - Summer (DST): UTC+02:00 (CEST)
- INSEE/Postal code: 89081 /89800
- ^{1} French Land Register data, which excludes lakes, ponds, glaciers > 1 km^{2} (0.386 sq mi or 247 acres) and river estuaries.

La Chapelle-Vaupelteigne (French pronunciation: [la ʃapɛl vopɛltɛɲ]) is a commune in the Yonne department, Bourgogne-Franche-Comté in north-central France.

== See also ==
- Communes of the Yonne department
