= Saint-Cyr-les-Colons =

- Commune
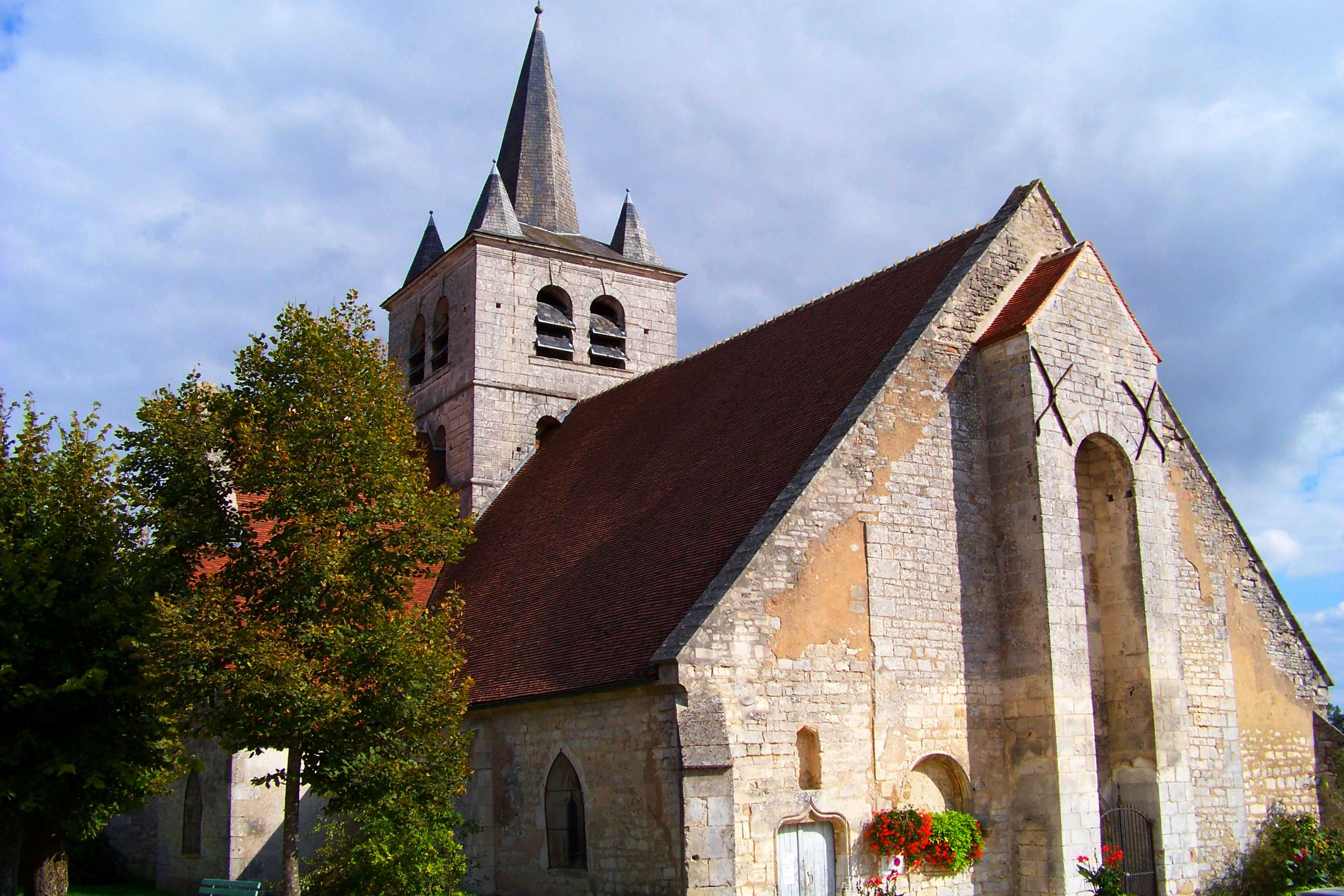
- The church in Saint-Cyr-les-Colons

- Coat of arms
- Location of Saint-Cyr-les-Colons
- Location within France Location within Bourgogne-Franche-Comté
- Coordinates: 47°44′33″N 3°44′20″E
- Country: France
- Region: Bourgogne-Franche-Comté
- Department: Yonne
- Arrondissement: Auxerre
- Canton: Chablis

Government
  - Mayor (2020–2026): Françoise Dolozilek
- Area^{1}: 34.77 km^{2} (13.42 sq mi)
- Highest elevation: 345 m (1,132 ft)
- Lowest elevation: 153 m (502 ft)
- Population (2023): 446
  - Density: 12.8/km^{2} (33.2/sq mi)
- Time zone: UTC+01:00 (CET)
  - Summer (DST): UTC+02:00 (CEST)
- INSEE/Postal code: 89341 /89800
- ^{1} French Land Register data, which excludes lakes, ponds, glaciers > 1 km^{2} (0.386 sq mi or 247 acres) and river estuaries.

Saint-Cyr-les-Colons (French pronunciation: [sɛ̃ siʁ le kɔlɔ̃]) is a commune in the Yonne department in Bourgogne-Franche-Comté in north-central France.

== See also ==
- Communes of the Yonne department
