= Villy, Yonne =

Villy
- Commune
- Coat of arms
- Location of Villy
- Location within France Location within Bourgogne-Franche-Comté
- Coordinates: 47°52′07″N 3°45′06″E
- Country: France
- Region: Bourgogne-Franche-Comté
- Department: Yonne
- Arrondissement: Auxerre
- Canton: Chablis
- Area^{1}: 5.84 km^{2} (2.25 sq mi)
- Highest elevation: 220 m (720 ft)
- Lowest elevation: 115 m (377 ft)
- Population (2023): 97
  - Density: 17/km^{2} (43/sq mi)
- Time zone: UTC+01:00 (CET)
  - Summer (DST): UTC+02:00 (CEST)
- INSEE/Postal code: 89477 /89800
- ^{1} French Land Register data, which excludes lakes, ponds, glaciers > 1 km^{2} (0.386 sq mi or 247 acres) and river estuaries.

Villy is a commune in the Yonne department in Bourgogne-Franche-Comté in north-central France.

== See also ==
- Communes of the Yonne department
