= Jouancy =

- Commune
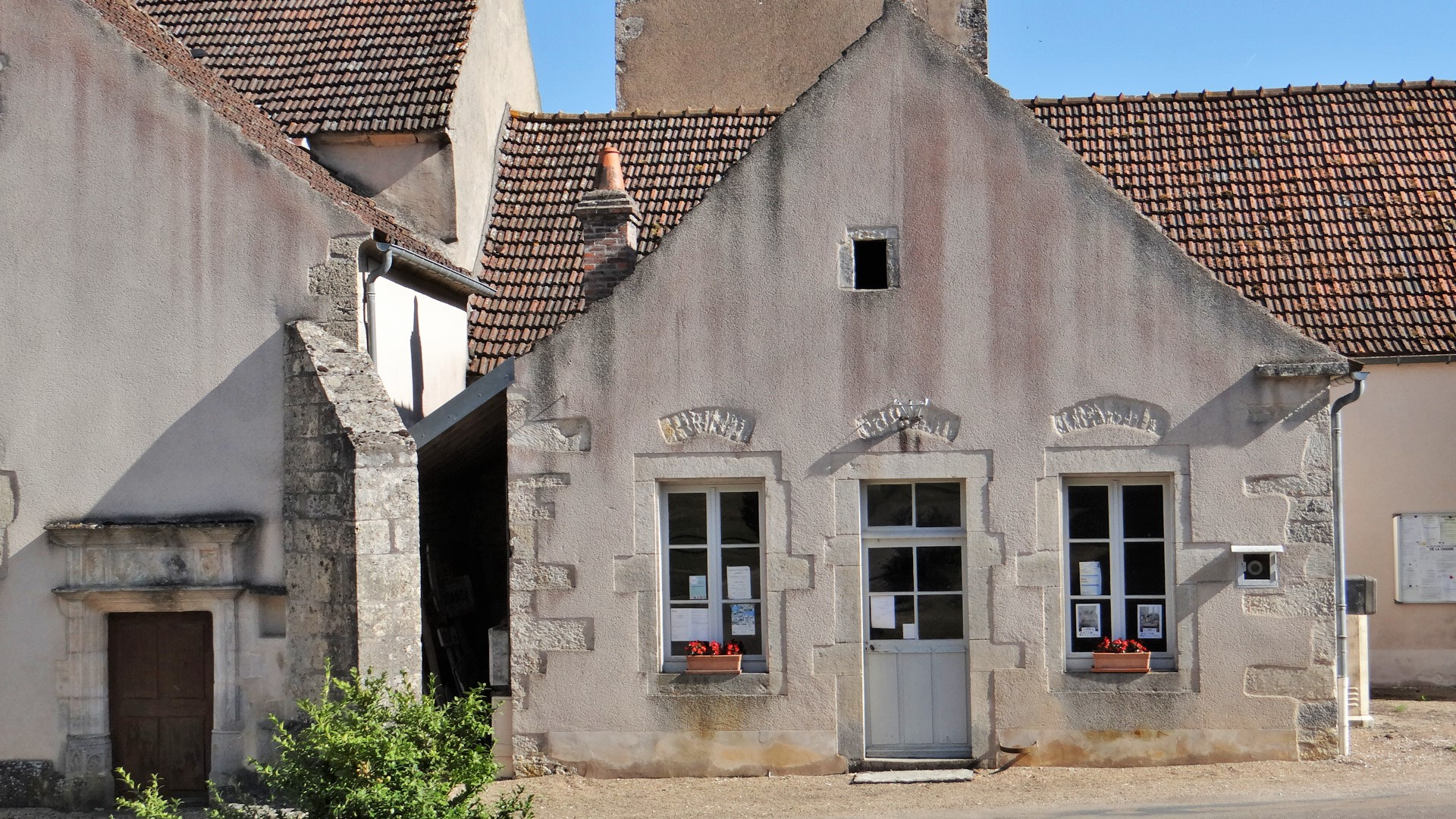
- The town hall in Jouancy
- Location of Jouancy
- Location within France Location within Bourgogne-Franche-Comté
- Coordinates: 47°41′01″N 4°02′04″E
- Country: France
- Region: Bourgogne-Franche-Comté
- Department: Yonne
- Arrondissement: Avallon
- Canton: Chablis

Government
  - Mayor (2020–2026): Stéphane Bardoux
- Area^{1}: 5.94 km^{2} (2.29 sq mi)
- Highest elevation: 305 m (1,001 ft)
- Lowest elevation: 200 m (660 ft)
- Population (2023): 29
  - Density: 4.9/km^{2} (13/sq mi)
- Time zone: UTC+01:00 (CET)
  - Summer (DST): UTC+02:00 (CEST)
- INSEE/Postal code: 89207 /89310
- ^{1} French Land Register data, which excludes lakes, ponds, glaciers > 1 km^{2} (0.386 sq mi or 247 acres) and river estuaries.

Jouancy (French pronunciation: [ʒwɑ̃si]) is a commune in the Yonne department in Bourgogne-Franche-Comté in north-central France.

== See also ==
- Communes of the Yonne department
