= Varennes, Yonne =

Varennes
- Commune
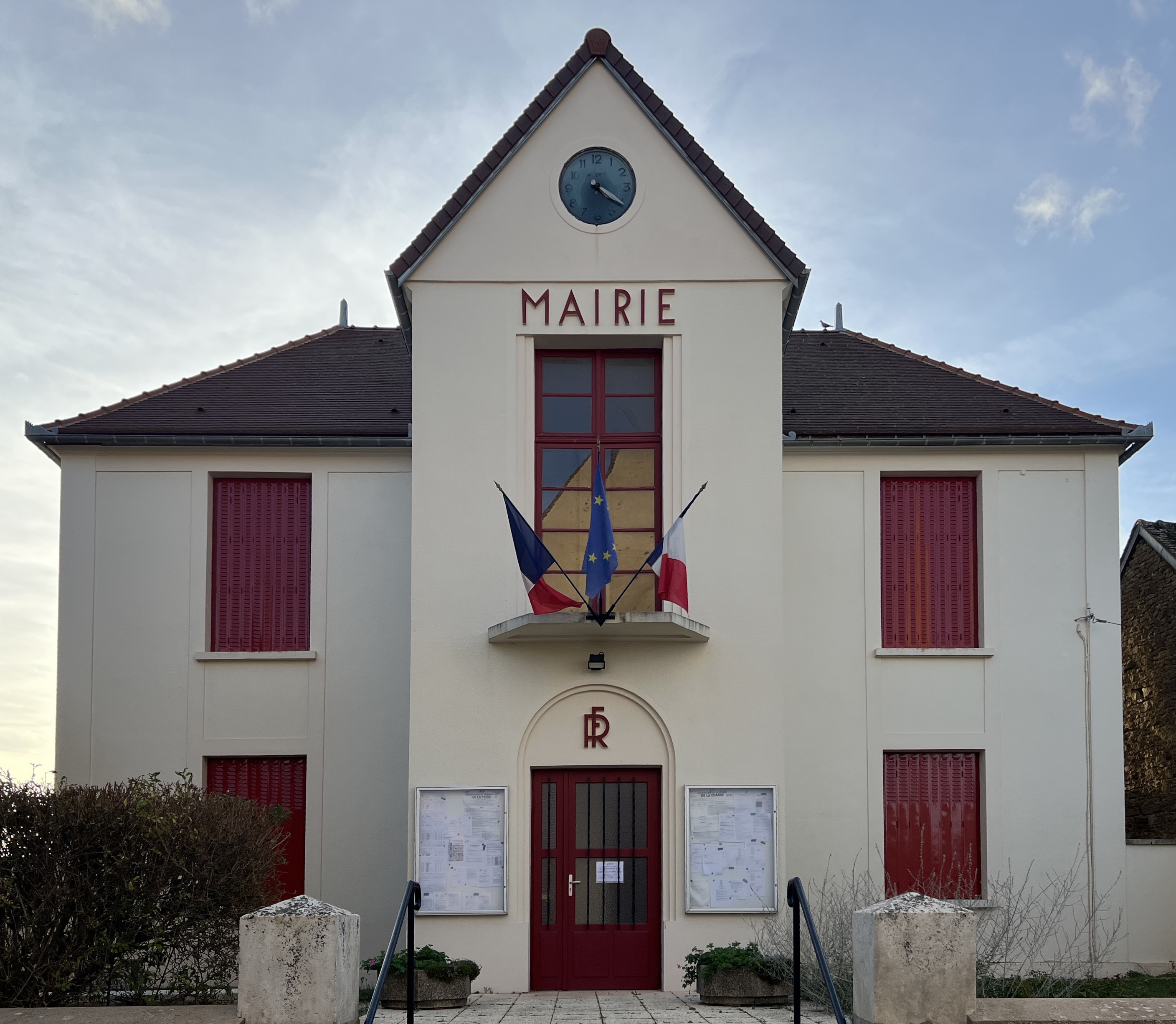
- Varennes Town hall

- Coat of arms
- Location of Varennes
- Location within France Location within Bourgogne-Franche-Comté
- Coordinates: 47°54′23″N 3°47′02″E
- Country: France
- Region: Bourgogne-Franche-Comté
- Department: Yonne
- Arrondissement: Auxerre
- Canton: Chablis

Government
  - Mayor (2020–2026): Aline Gally
- Area^{1}: 10.06 km^{2} (3.88 sq mi)
- Highest elevation: 193 m (633 ft)
- Lowest elevation: 122 m (400 ft)
- Population (2023): 331
  - Density: 32.9/km^{2} (85.2/sq mi)
- Time zone: UTC+01:00 (CET)
  - Summer (DST): UTC+02:00 (CEST)
- INSEE/Postal code: 89430 /89144
- ^{1} French Land Register data, which excludes lakes, ponds, glaciers > 1 km^{2} (0.386 sq mi or 247 acres) and river estuaries.

Varennes (French pronunciation: [vaʁɛn]) is a commune in the Yonne department in Bourgogne-Franche-Comté in north-central France.

== See also ==
- Communes of the Yonne department
