= Courgis =

- Commune
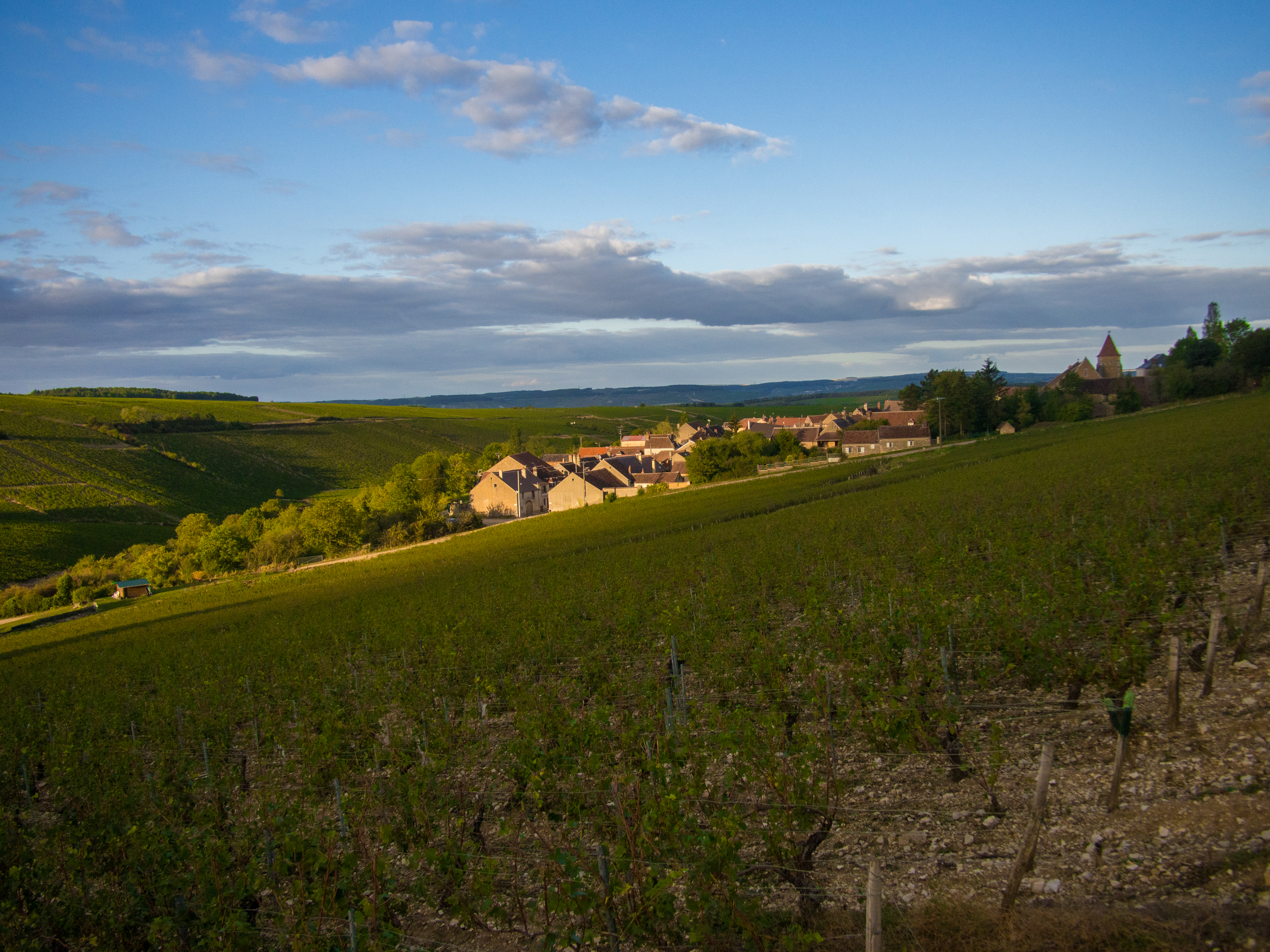
- A general view of Courgis

- Coat of arms
- Location of Courgis
- Location within France Location within Bourgogne-Franche-Comté
- Coordinates: 47°46′30″N 3°45′20″E
- Country: France
- Region: Bourgogne-Franche-Comté
- Department: Yonne
- Arrondissement: Auxerre
- Canton: Chablis
- Area^{1}: 10.04 km^{2} (3.88 sq mi)
- Highest elevation: 339 m (1,112 ft)
- Lowest elevation: 169 m (554 ft)
- Population (2023): 231
  - Density: 23.0/km^{2} (59.6/sq mi)
- Time zone: UTC+01:00 (CET)
  - Summer (DST): UTC+02:00 (CEST)
- INSEE/Postal code: 89123 /89800
- ^{1} French Land Register data, which excludes lakes, ponds, glaciers > 1 km^{2} (0.386 sq mi or 247 acres) and river estuaries.

Courgis is a commune in the Yonne department in Bourgogne-Franche-Comté in north-central France.

== See also ==
- Communes of the Yonne department
