= Talcy, Yonne =

Talcy
- Commune
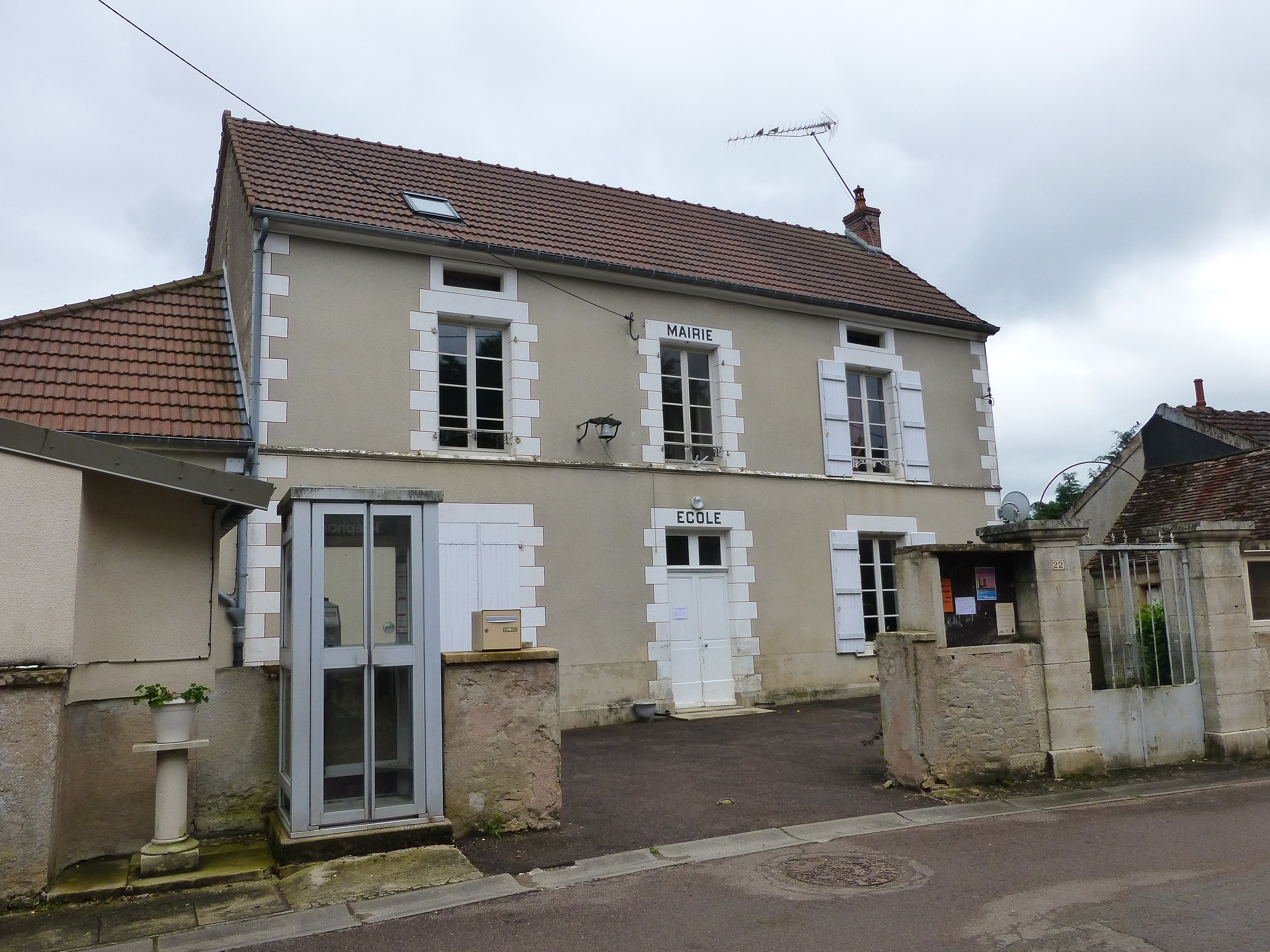
- The town hall in Talcy
- Location of Talcy
- Location within France Location within Bourgogne-Franche-Comté
- Coordinates: 47°34′23″N 4°04′13″E
- Country: France
- Region: Bourgogne-Franche-Comté
- Department: Yonne
- Arrondissement: Avallon
- Canton: Chablis

Government
  - Mayor (2020–2026): Hubert Naulot
- Area^{1}: 6.88 km^{2} (2.66 sq mi)
- Highest elevation: 320 m (1,050 ft)
- Lowest elevation: 216 m (709 ft)
- Population (2023): 83
  - Density: 12/km^{2} (31/sq mi)
- Time zone: UTC+01:00 (CET)
  - Summer (DST): UTC+02:00 (CEST)
- INSEE/Postal code: 89406 /89420
- ^{1} French Land Register data, which excludes lakes, ponds, glaciers > 1 km^{2} (0.386 sq mi or 247 acres) and river estuaries.

Talcy (French pronunciation: [talsi]) is a commune in the Yonne department in Bourgogne-Franche-Comté in north-central France.

== See also ==
- Communes of the Yonne department
