= Chemilly-sur-Serein =

- Commune
- Coat of arms
- Location of Chemilly-sur-Serein
- Location within France Location within Bourgogne-Franche-Comté
- Coordinates: 47°46′19″N 3°51′46″E
- Country: France
- Region: Bourgogne-Franche-Comté
- Department: Yonne
- Arrondissement: Auxerre
- Canton: Chablis

Government
  - Mayor (2020–2026): Gérald Vilain
- Area^{1}: 13.00 km^{2} (5.02 sq mi)
- Highest elevation: 272 m (892 ft)
- Lowest elevation: 141 m (463 ft)
- Population (2023): 134
  - Density: 10.3/km^{2} (26.7/sq mi)
- Time zone: UTC+01:00 (CET)
  - Summer (DST): UTC+02:00 (CEST)
- INSEE/Postal code: 89095 /89800
- ^{1} French Land Register data, which excludes lakes, ponds, glaciers > 1 km^{2} (0.386 sq mi or 247 acres) and river estuaries.

Chemilly-sur-Serein (French pronunciation: [ʃəmiji syʁ səʁɛ̃], literally Chemilly on Serein) is a commune in the Yonne department in Bourgogne-Franche-Comté in north-central France.

== See also ==
- Communes of the Yonne department
