= Santigny =

- Commune
- Location of Santigny
- Location within France Location within Bourgogne-Franche-Comté
- Coordinates: 47°34′06″N 4°07′20″E
- Country: France
- Region: Bourgogne-Franche-Comté
- Department: Yonne
- Arrondissement: Avallon
- Canton: Chablis

Government
  - Mayor (2020–2026): Sylvie Charpignon
- Area^{1}: 9.35 km^{2} (3.61 sq mi)
- Highest elevation: 354 m (1,161 ft)
- Lowest elevation: 243 m (797 ft)
- Population (2023): 83
  - Density: 8.9/km^{2} (23/sq mi)
- Time zone: UTC+01:00 (CET)
  - Summer (DST): UTC+02:00 (CEST)
- INSEE/Postal code: 89375 /89420
- ^{1} French Land Register data, which excludes lakes, ponds, glaciers > 1 km^{2} (0.386 sq mi or 247 acres) and river estuaries.

Santigny (French pronunciation: [sɑ̃tiɲi]) is a commune in the Yonne department in Bourgogne-Franche-Comté in north-central France.

== See also ==
- Communes of the Yonne department
