= Montréal, Yonne =

Montréal
- Commune
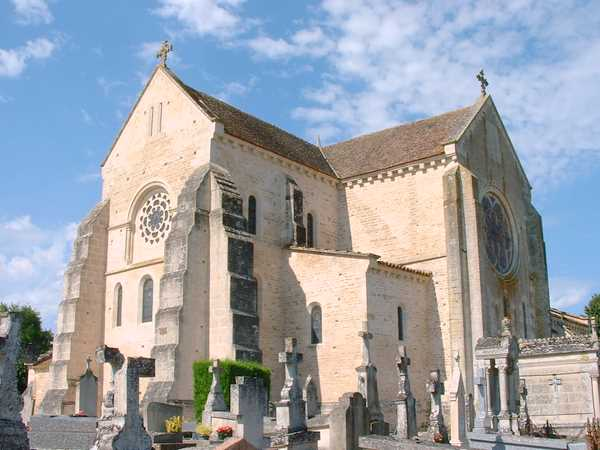
- The collegiate church in Montréal

- Coat of arms
- Location of Montréal
- Location within France Location within Bourgogne-Franche-Comté
- Coordinates: 47°32′35″N 4°02′12″E
- Country: France
- Region: Bourgogne-Franche-Comté
- Department: Yonne
- Arrondissement: Avallon
- Canton: Chablis

Government
  - Mayor (2020–2026): Michel Gchweinder
- Area^{1}: 7.41 km^{2} (2.86 sq mi)
- Highest elevation: 305 m (1,001 ft)
- Lowest elevation: 199 m (653 ft)
- Population (2023): 161
  - Density: 21.7/km^{2} (56.3/sq mi)
- Time zone: UTC+01:00 (CET)
  - Summer (DST): UTC+02:00 (CEST)
- INSEE/Postal code: 89267 /89420
- ^{1} French Land Register data, which excludes lakes, ponds, glaciers > 1 km^{2} (0.386 sq mi or 247 acres) and river estuaries.

Montréal (French pronunciation: [mɔ̃ʁe.al]) is a commune in the Yonne department in Bourgogne-Franche-Comté in north-central France.

== See also ==
- Communes of the Yonne department
