= Saint-André-en-Terre-Plaine =

- Commune
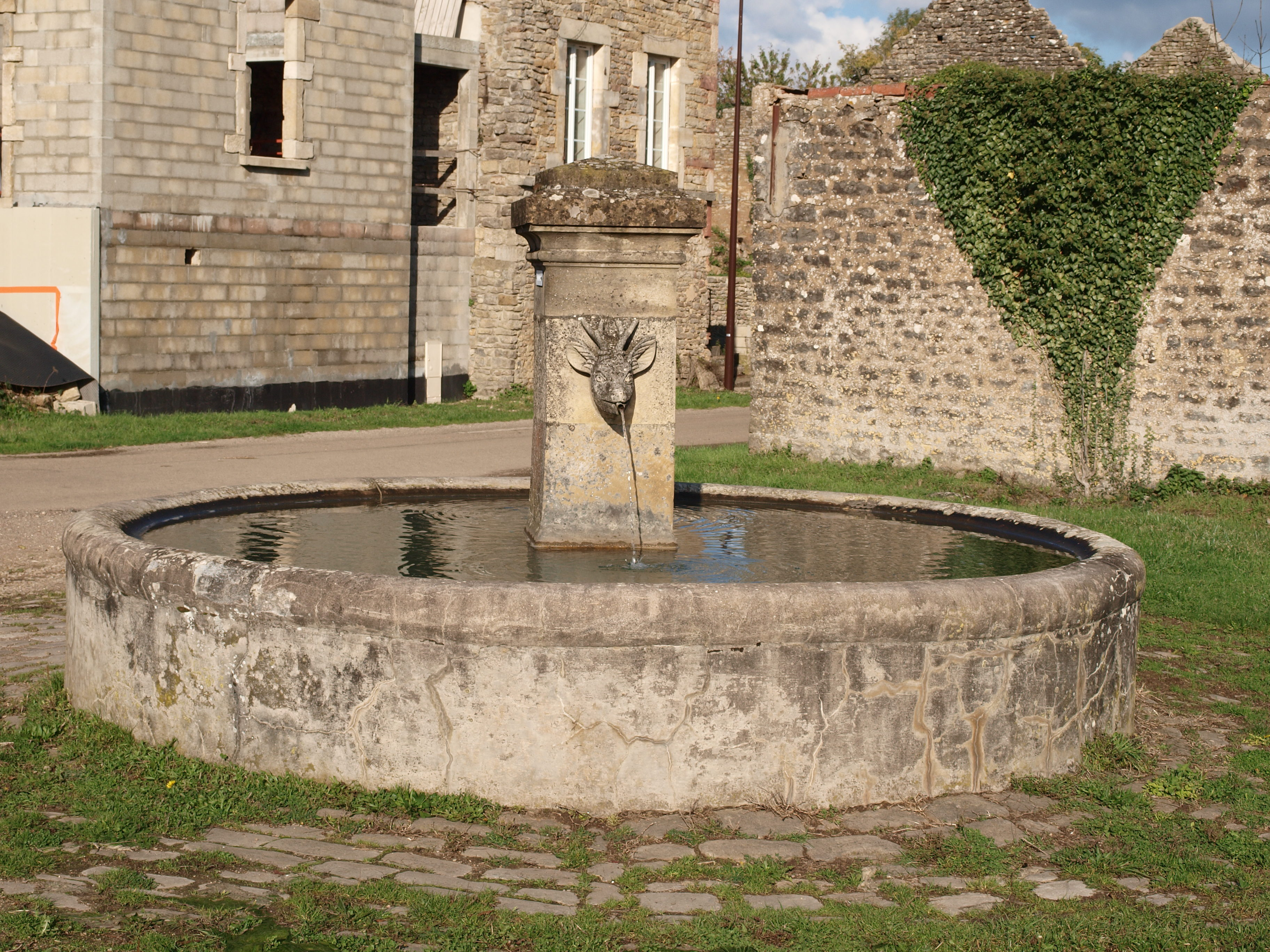
- The public fountain in Saint-André-en-Terre-Plaine
- Location of Saint-André-en-Terre-Plaine
- Location within France Location within Bourgogne-Franche-Comté
- Coordinates: 47°28′52″N 4°03′36″E
- Country: France
- Region: Bourgogne-Franche-Comté
- Department: Yonne
- Arrondissement: Avallon
- Canton: Chablis

Government
  - Mayor (2020–2026): Pascal Dubois
- Area^{1}: 14.26 km^{2} (5.51 sq mi)
- Highest elevation: 336 m (1,102 ft)
- Lowest elevation: 251 m (823 ft)
- Population (2023): 164
  - Density: 11.5/km^{2} (29.8/sq mi)
- Time zone: UTC+01:00 (CET)
  - Summer (DST): UTC+02:00 (CEST)
- INSEE/Postal code: 89333 /89420
- ^{1} French Land Register data, which excludes lakes, ponds, glaciers > 1 km^{2} (0.386 sq mi or 247 acres) and river estuaries.

Saint-André-en-Terre-Plaine (French pronunciation: [sɛ̃.t‿ɑ̃dʁe ɑ̃ tɛʁ plɛn]) is a commune in the Yonne department in Bourgogne-Franche-Comté in north-central France.

== See also ==
- Communes of the Yonne department
