= Bierry-les-Belles-Fontaines =

- Commune
- Coat of arms
- Location of Bierry-les-Belles-Fontaines
- Location within France Location within Bourgogne-Franche-Comté
- Coordinates: 47°35′49″N 4°11′06″E
- Country: France
- Region: Bourgogne-Franche-Comté
- Department: Yonne
- Arrondissement: Avallon
- Canton: Chablis

Government
  - Mayor (2020–2026): Daniel Raverat
- Area^{1}: 26.90 km^{2} (10.39 sq mi)
- Highest elevation: 371 m (1,217 ft)
- Lowest elevation: 220 m (720 ft)
- Population (2023): 163
  - Density: 6.06/km^{2} (15.7/sq mi)
- Time zone: UTC+01:00 (CET)
  - Summer (DST): UTC+02:00 (CEST)
- INSEE/Postal code: 89042 /89420
- ^{1} French Land Register data, which excludes lakes, ponds, glaciers > 1 km^{2} (0.386 sq mi or 247 acres) and river estuaries.

Bierry-les-Belles-Fontaines (French pronunciation: [bjɛʁi le bɛl fɔ̃tɛn]) is a commune in the Yonne department in Bourgogne-Franche-Comté in north-central France.

== See also ==
- Communes of the Yonne department
