= Savigny-en-Terre-Plaine =

- Commune
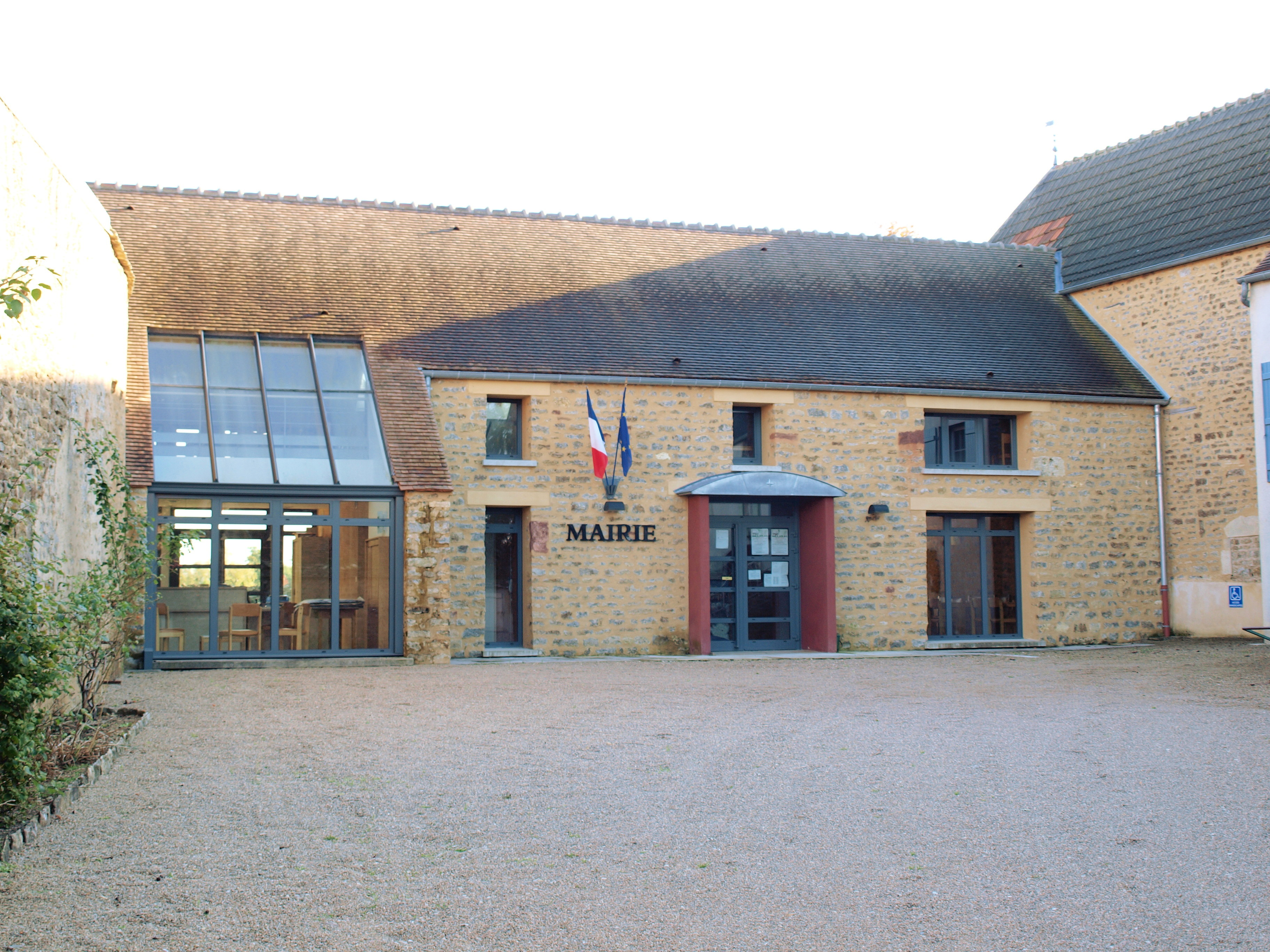
- The town hall in Savigny-en-Terre-Plaine

- Coat of arms
- Location of Savigny-en-Terre-Plaine
- Location within France Location within Bourgogne-Franche-Comté
- Coordinates: 47°29′48″N 4°05′11″E
- Country: France
- Region: Bourgogne-Franche-Comté
- Department: Yonne
- Arrondissement: Avallon
- Canton: Chablis

Government
  - Mayor (2020–2026): Annie Rousseau
- Area^{1}: 8.69 km^{2} (3.36 sq mi)
- Elevation: 249 m (817 ft)
- Highest elevation: 294 m (965 ft)
- Lowest elevation: 227 m (745 ft)
- Population (2023): 137
  - Density: 15.8/km^{2} (40.8/sq mi)
- Time zone: UTC+01:00 (CET)
  - Summer (DST): UTC+02:00 (CEST)
- INSEE/Postal code: 89379 /89420
- ^{1} French Land Register data, which excludes lakes, ponds, glaciers > 1 km^{2} (0.386 sq mi or 247 acres) and river estuaries.

Savigny-en-Terre-Plaine (French pronunciation: [saviɲi ɑ̃ tɛʁ plɛn]) is a commune in the Yonne department in Bourgogne-Franche-Comté in north-central France.

== Demography ==
Historical population
| Year | Pop. | ±% p.a. |
|---|---|---|
| 1968 | 260 | — |
| 1975 | 220 | −2.36% |
| 1982 | 202 | −1.21% |
| 1990 | 180 | −1.43% |
| 1999 | 151 | −1.93% |
| 2007 | 140 | −0.94% |
| 2012 | 153 | +1.79% |
| 2017 | 153 | +0.00% |
| 2023 | 137 | −1.82% |
Source: INSEE

== See also ==
- Communes of the Yonne department
