= Vassy-sous-Pisy =

- Commune
- Location of Vassy-sous-Pisy
- Location within France Location within Bourgogne-Franche-Comté
- Coordinates: 47°34′11″N 4°10′07″E
- Country: France
- Region: Bourgogne-Franche-Comté
- Department: Yonne
- Arrondissement: Avallon
- Canton: Chablis

Government
  - Mayor (2020–2026): Michel Codran
- Area^{1}: 7.45 km^{2} (2.88 sq mi)
- Highest elevation: 377 m (1,237 ft)
- Lowest elevation: 264 m (866 ft)
- Population (2023): 61
  - Density: 8.2/km^{2} (21/sq mi)
- Time zone: UTC+01:00 (CET)
  - Summer (DST): UTC+02:00 (CEST)
- INSEE/Postal code: 89431 /89420
- ^{1} French Land Register data, which excludes lakes, ponds, glaciers > 1 km^{2} (0.386 sq mi or 247 acres) and river estuaries.

Vassy-sous-Pisy (French pronunciation: [vasi su pizi], literally Vassy under Pisy; before 2010: Vassy) is a commune in the Yonne department in Bourgogne-Franche-Comté in north-central France.

== Geography ==
The town is built on the summit of a 310 m high conical hill or monticule.

== History ==
The ancient route from Paris to Lyon passed through Vassy, and in the 13th century we find a mention of the town, under the name of Vasseium. In 1786 investigations were made into the possibility of coal mining here. In the 19th century the town gained a train station on the Auxerre-Avallon line, thanks to the factory of Honoré Gariel. He and his brother Hippolyte had created a company or Société able to produce hydraulic lime.

" A depot was founded in Paris; the cement, named from then on Ciment romain de Vassy, was employed by considerable businesses, and made the Société's fortune, though Honoré Gariel had by then ceased to take a part in the Société."

A modest hamlet previously dependent on Étaule, Vassy would thus become — with an influx of blue-collar workers — a commune in its own right.

The hamlet surpassed the town's administrative center: The Gariel family endowed a town girls school (directed by the soeurs de la Providence, or sisters of Providence) with a chapel and a presbytery. As the population uniformly increased, a new church was begun in 1859 and finished in 1862.

== Mayors ==
From	To	Name	Party
1904	1919	Auguste Legast	
1919	1925	Charles Legast	
1925	1929	Camille Gallon	
1929	1944	Guy Verrier	
1944	1945	Germain Genty	
1945	1969	Emile Gallon	
1969	1989	Roger Canat	
1989	2008	Michelle Philipot	

== See also ==
- Communes of the Yonne department
