= Sauvigny-le-Beuréal =

- Commune
- Location of Sauvigny-le-Beuréal
- Location within France Location within Bourgogne-Franche-Comté
- Coordinates: 47°29′16″N 4°06′36″E
- Country: France
- Region: Bourgogne-Franche-Comté
- Department: Yonne
- Arrondissement: Avallon
- Canton: Chablis

Government
  - Mayor (2020–2026): Pierre Noirot
- Area^{1}: 4.82 km^{2} (1.86 sq mi)
- Highest elevation: 324 m (1,063 ft)
- Lowest elevation: 224 m (735 ft)
- Population (2023): 67
  - Density: 14/km^{2} (36/sq mi)
- Time zone: UTC+01:00 (CET)
  - Summer (DST): UTC+02:00 (CEST)
- INSEE/Postal code: 89377 /89420
- ^{1} French Land Register data, which excludes lakes, ponds, glaciers > 1 km^{2} (0.386 sq mi or 247 acres) and river estuaries.

Sauvigny-le-Beuréal (French pronunciation: [soviɲi lə bøʁeal]) is a commune in the Yonne department in Bourgogne-Franche-Comté in north-central France.

== See also ==
- Communes of the Yonne department
