= Poilly-sur-Serein =

- Commune
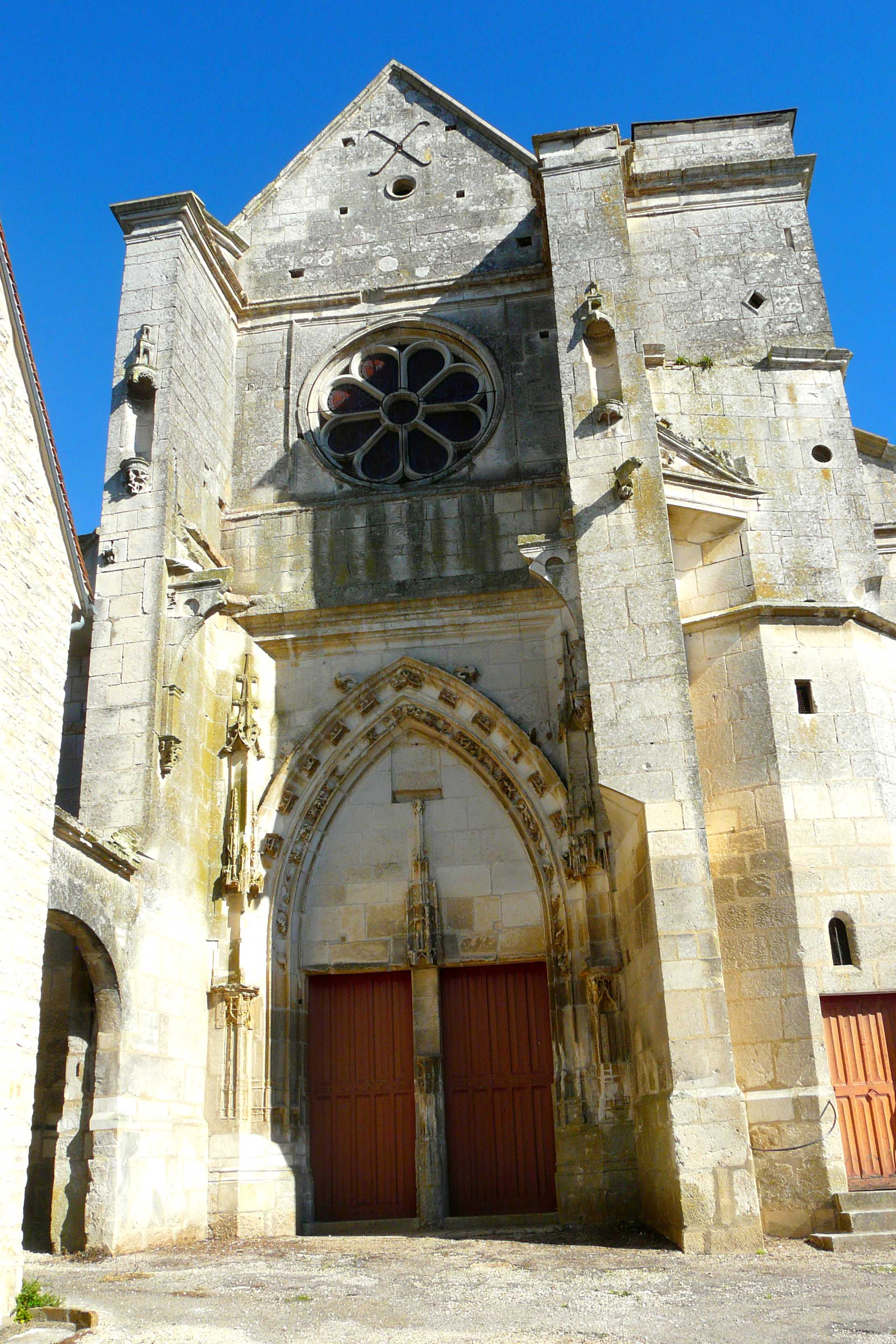
- The church in Poilly

- Coat of arms
- Location of Poilly-sur-Serein
- Location within France Location within Bourgogne-Franche-Comté
- Coordinates: 47°45′55″N 3°53′36″E
- Country: France
- Region: Bourgogne-Franche-Comté
- Department: Yonne
- Arrondissement: Auxerre
- Canton: Chablis

Government
  - Mayor (2020–2026): Hélène Comoy
- Area^{1}: 21.28 km^{2} (8.22 sq mi)
- Highest elevation: 288 m (945 ft)
- Lowest elevation: 142 m (466 ft)
- Population (2023): 240
  - Density: 11/km^{2} (29/sq mi)
- Time zone: UTC+01:00 (CET)
  - Summer (DST): UTC+02:00 (CEST)
- INSEE/Postal code: 89303 /89310
- ^{1} French Land Register data, which excludes lakes, ponds, glaciers > 1 km^{2} (0.386 sq mi or 247 acres) and river estuaries.

Poilly-sur-Serein (French pronunciation: [pwaji syʁ səʁɛ̃], literally Poilly on Serein) is a commune in the Yonne department in Bourgogne-Franche-Comté in north-central France.

== Climate ==
Climate data for Poilly-sur-Serein, 1981–2010 normals
Month	Jan	Feb	Mar	Apr	May	Jun	Jul	Aug	Sep	Oct	Nov	Dec	Year
Mean daily maximum °C (°F)	6 (43)	8 (46)	13 (55)	16 (61)	20 (68)	23 (73)	26 (79)	26 (79)	22 (72)	16 (61)	10 (50)	7 (45)	16 (61)
Mean daily minimum °C (°F)	1 (34)	1 (34)	3 (37)	5 (41)	9 (48)	12 (54)	14 (57)	14 (57)	11 (52)	8 (46)	4 (39)	1 (34)	7 (44)
Average precipitation mm (inches)	66.8 (2.63)	55.1 (2.17)	60.6 (2.39)	60.8 (2.39)	75.5 (2.97)	67.6 (2.66)	62.8 (2.47)	59.9 (2.36)	62.5 (2.46)	77.3 (3.04)	67.4 (2.65)	73.0 (2.87)	789.3 (31.06)
Source: Chelsa Climate

== See also ==
- Communes of the Yonne department
