= Môlay =

- Commune
- Location of Môlay
- Location within France Location within Bourgogne-Franche-Comté
- Coordinates: 47°44′08″N 3°56′25″E
- Country: France
- Region: Bourgogne-Franche-Comté
- Department: Yonne
- Arrondissement: Avallon
- Canton: Chablis

Government
  - Mayor (2020–2026): Claudine Manigault
- Area^{1}: 12.00 km^{2} (4.63 sq mi)
- Highest elevation: 273 m (896 ft)
- Lowest elevation: 157 m (515 ft)
- Population (2023): 101
  - Density: 8.42/km^{2} (21.8/sq mi)
- Time zone: UTC+01:00 (CET)
  - Summer (DST): UTC+02:00 (CEST)
- INSEE/Postal code: 89259 /89310
- ^{1} French Land Register data, which excludes lakes, ponds, glaciers > 1 km^{2} (0.386 sq mi or 247 acres) and river estuaries.

Môlay (French pronunciation: [molɛ]) is a commune in the Yonne department in Bourgogne-Franche-Comté in north-central France.

== See also ==
- Communes of the Yonne department
