= Blacy, Yonne =

Blacy
- Commune
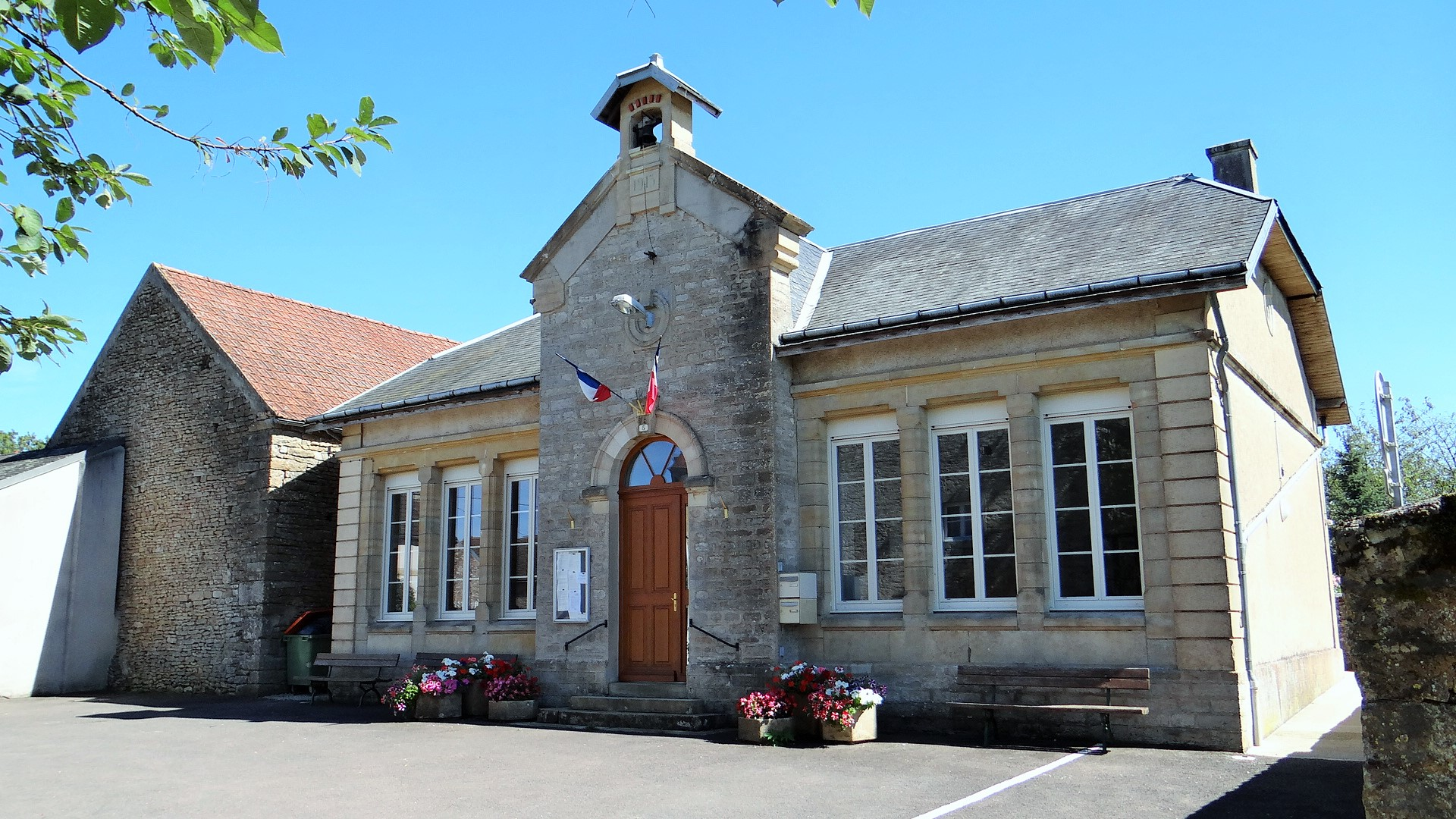
- The town hall in Blacy
- Location of Blacy
- Location within France Location within Bourgogne-Franche-Comté
- Coordinates: 47°34′24″N 4°02′40″E
- Country: France
- Region: Bourgogne-Franche-Comté
- Department: Yonne
- Arrondissement: Avallon
- Canton: Chablis

Government
  - Mayor (2020–2026): Nadine Legendre
- Area^{1}: 9.06 km^{2} (3.50 sq mi)
- Highest elevation: 331 m (1,086 ft)
- Lowest elevation: 197 m (646 ft)
- Population (2023): 99
  - Density: 11/km^{2} (28/sq mi)
- Time zone: UTC+01:00 (CET)
  - Summer (DST): UTC+02:00 (CEST)
- INSEE/Postal code: 89043 /89440
- ^{1} French Land Register data, which excludes lakes, ponds, glaciers > 1 km^{2} (0.386 sq mi or 247 acres) and river estuaries.

Blacy (French pronunciation: [blasi]) is a commune in the Yonne department in Bourgogne-Franche-Comté in north-central France.

== See also ==
- Communes of the Yonne department
