= Marmeaux =

- Commune
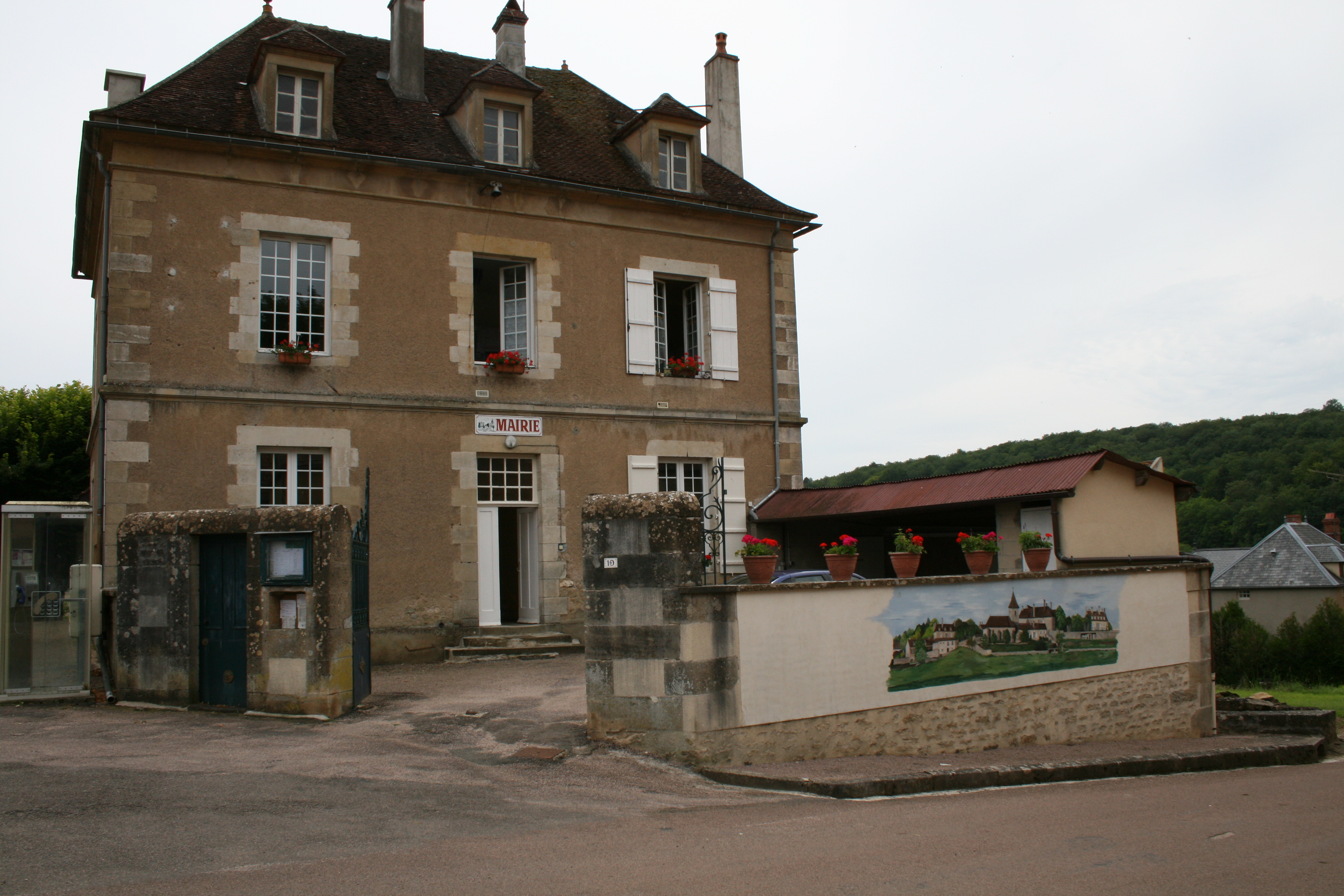
- The town hall in Marmeaux
- Location of Marmeaux
- Location within France Location within Bourgogne-Franche-Comté
- Coordinates: 47°34′59″N 4°05′50″E
- Country: France
- Region: Bourgogne-Franche-Comté
- Department: Yonne
- Arrondissement: Avallon
- Canton: Chablis

Government
  - Mayor (2020–2026): François Camburet
- Area^{1}: 10.76 km^{2} (4.15 sq mi)
- Highest elevation: 339 m (1,112 ft)
- Lowest elevation: 230 m (750 ft)
- Population (2023): 84
  - Density: 7.8/km^{2} (20/sq mi)
- Time zone: UTC+01:00 (CET)
  - Summer (DST): UTC+02:00 (CEST)
- INSEE/Postal code: 89244 /89420
- ^{1} French Land Register data, which excludes lakes, ponds, glaciers > 1 km^{2} (0.386 sq mi or 247 acres) and river estuaries.

Marmeaux (French pronunciation: [maʁmo]) is a commune in the Yonne department in Bourgogne-Franche-Comté in north-central France.

== See also ==
- Communes of the Yonne department
