= Aigremont, Yonne =

Aigremont
- Commune
- Coat of arms
- Location of Aigremont
- Location within France Location within Bourgogne-Franche-Comté
- Coordinates: 47°43′10″N 3°53′28″E
- Country: France
- Region: Bourgogne-Franche-Comté
- Department: Yonne
- Arrondissement: Auxerre
- Canton: Chablis
- Intercommunality: Chablis, Villages et Terroirs

Government
  - Mayor (2020–2026): Frédéric Montreynaud
- Area^{1}: 6.82 km^{2} (2.63 sq mi)
- Highest elevation: 271 m (889 ft)
- Lowest elevation: 176 m (577 ft)
- Population (2023): 69
  - Density: 10/km^{2} (26/sq mi)
- Time zone: UTC+01:00 (CET)
  - Summer (DST): UTC+02:00 (CEST)
- INSEE/Postal code: 89002 /89800
- ^{1} French Land Register data, which excludes lakes, ponds, glaciers > 1 km^{2} (0.386 sq mi or 247 acres) and river estuaries.

Aigremont (French pronunciation: [ɛɡʁəmɔ̃]) is a commune in the Yonne department in Bourgogne-Franche-Comté in north-central France.

== Population ==
Historical population
Year	Pop.	±% p.a.
1968	49	—
1975	63	+3.66%
1982	60	−0.69%
1990	58	−0.42%
1999	75	+2.90%
2007	68	−1.22%
2012	76	+2.25%
2017	78	+0.52%
2023	69	−2.02%
Source: INSEE

== See also ==
- Communes of the Yonne department
