= Thizy, Yonne =

Thizy
- Commune
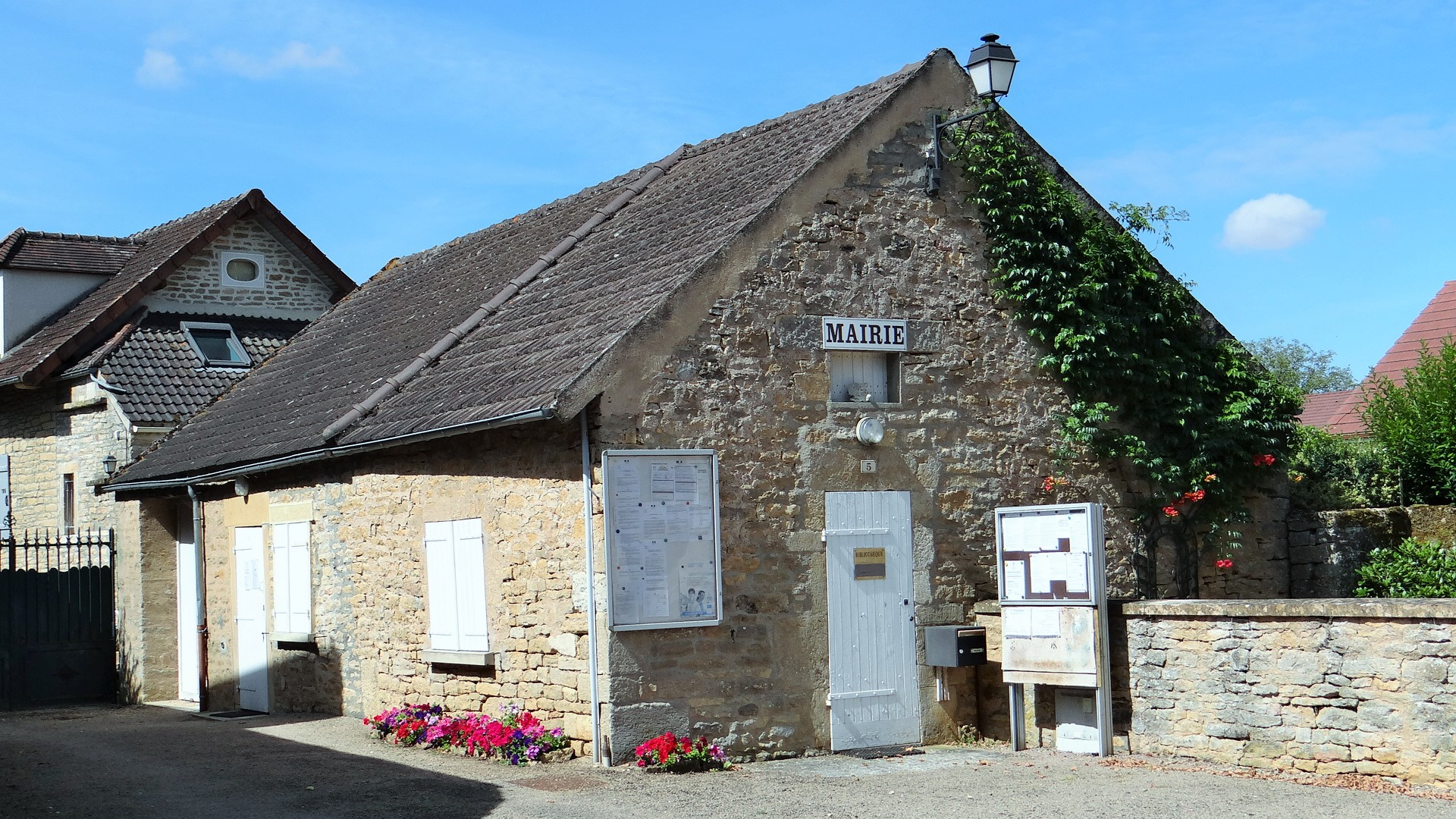
- The town hall in Thizy
- Location of Thizy
- Location within France Location within Bourgogne-Franche-Comté
- Coordinates: 47°34′17″N 4°03′21″E
- Country: France
- Region: Bourgogne-Franche-Comté
- Department: Yonne
- Arrondissement: Avallon
- Canton: Chablis

Government
  - Mayor (2020–2026): Bernard Enfrun
- Area^{1}: 5.55 km^{2} (2.14 sq mi)
- Highest elevation: 332 m (1,089 ft)
- Lowest elevation: 211 m (692 ft)
- Population (2023): 186
  - Density: 33.5/km^{2} (86.8/sq mi)
- Time zone: UTC+01:00 (CET)
  - Summer (DST): UTC+02:00 (CEST)
- INSEE/Postal code: 89412 /89420
- ^{1} French Land Register data, which excludes lakes, ponds, glaciers > 1 km^{2} (0.386 sq mi or 247 acres) and river estuaries.

Thizy (French pronunciation: [tizi]) is a commune in the Yonne department in Bourgogne-Franche-Comté in north-central France.

== See also ==
- Communes of the Yonne department
