= Pisy =

- Commune
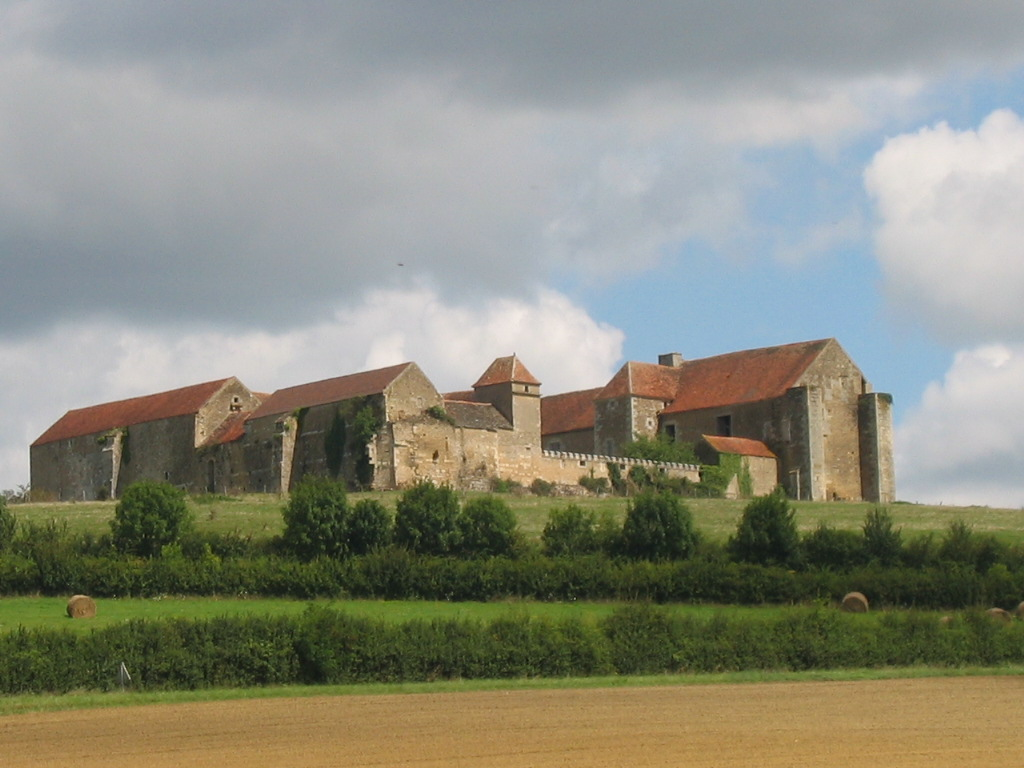
- The chateau in Pisy

- Coat of arms
- Location of Pisy
- Location within France Location within Bourgogne-Franche-Comté
- Coordinates: 47°33′22″N 4°08′33″E
- Country: France
- Region: Bourgogne-Franche-Comté
- Department: Yonne
- Arrondissement: Avallon
- Canton: Chablis

Government
  - Mayor (2020–2026): Guy Gueniffey
- Area^{1}: 12.08 km^{2} (4.66 sq mi)
- Highest elevation: 391 m (1,283 ft)
- Lowest elevation: 227 m (745 ft)
- Population (2023): 80
  - Density: 6.6/km^{2} (17/sq mi)
- Time zone: UTC+01:00 (CET)
  - Summer (DST): UTC+02:00 (CEST)
- INSEE/Postal code: 89300 /89420
- ^{1} French Land Register data, which excludes lakes, ponds, glaciers > 1 km^{2} (0.386 sq mi or 247 acres) and river estuaries.

Pisy (French pronunciation: [pizi]) is a commune in the Yonne department, in the Bourgogne-Franche-Comté region of north-central France.

== See also ==
- Communes of the Yonne department
