= Festigny =

Festigny may refer to the following places in France:

- Festigny, Marne, a commune in the Marne department
- Festigny, Yonne, a commune in the Yonne department
