= Sery =

Sery may refer to the following places in France:

- Sery, Ardennes
- Sery, Yonne
- Séry-lès-Mézières, Aisne
- Séry-Magneval, Oise
