= Fontenay-sous-Fouronnes =

- Commune
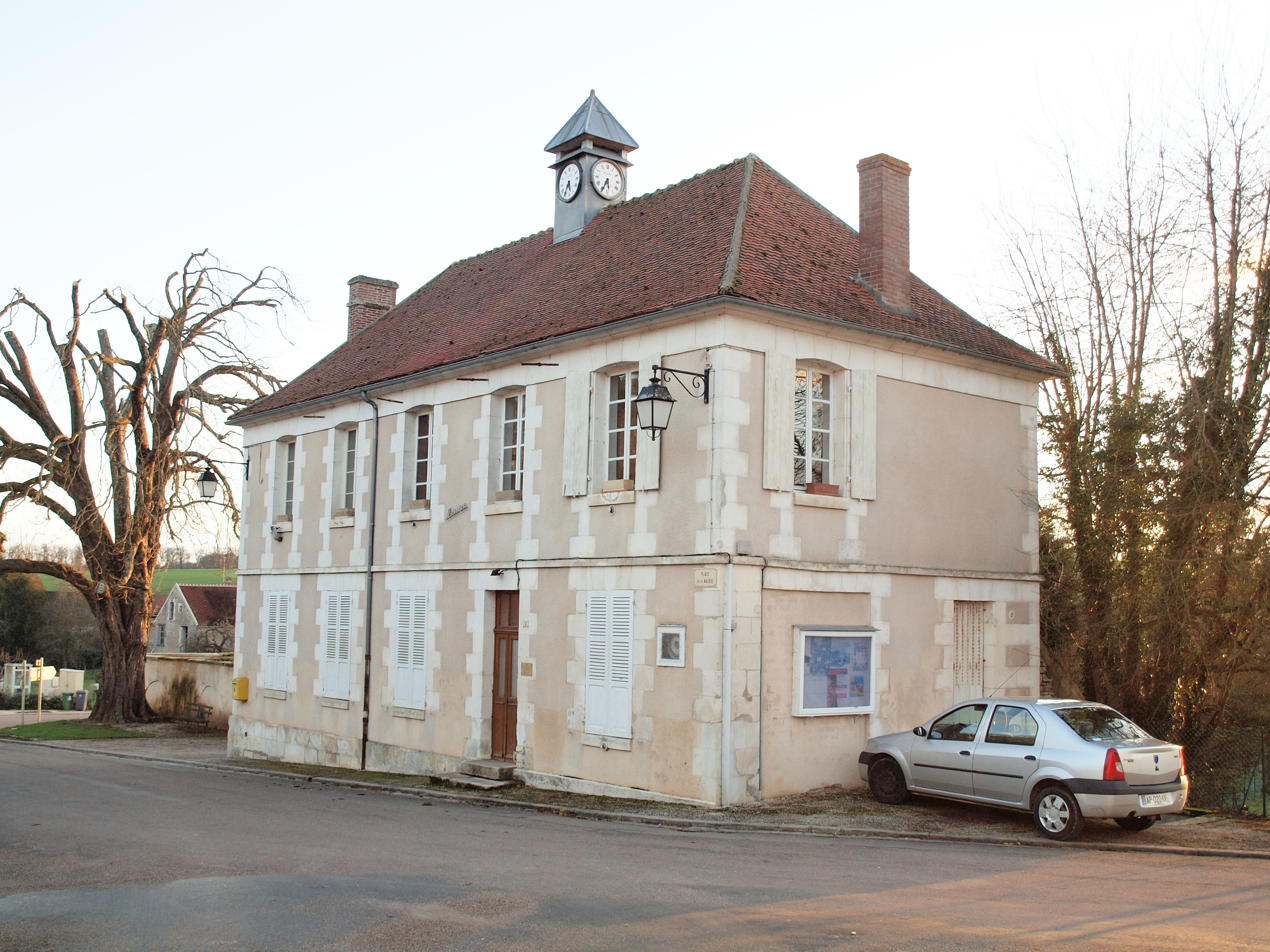
- The town hall in Fontenay-sous-Fouronnes
- Location of Fontenay-sous-Fouronnes
- Location within France Location within Bourgogne-Franche-Comté
- Coordinates: 47°37′01″N 3°35′51″E
- Country: France
- Region: Bourgogne-Franche-Comté
- Department: Yonne
- Arrondissement: Auxerre
- Canton: Joux-la-Ville

Government
  - Mayor (2020–2026): André Vanhoucke
- Area^{1}: 12.34 km^{2} (4.76 sq mi)
- Highest elevation: 273 m (896 ft)
- Lowest elevation: 149 m (489 ft)
- Population (2023): 90
  - Density: 7.3/km^{2} (19/sq mi)
- Time zone: UTC+01:00 (CET)
  - Summer (DST): UTC+02:00 (CEST)
- INSEE/Postal code: 89177 /89660
- ^{1} French Land Register data, which excludes lakes, ponds, glaciers > 1 km^{2} (0.386 sq mi or 247 acres) and river estuaries.

Fontenay-sous-Fouronnes (French pronunciation: [fɔ̃tnɛ su fuʁɔn], literally Fontenay under Fouronnes) is a commune in the Yonne department in Bourgogne-Franche-Comté in north-central France.

== See also ==
- Communes of the Yonne department
