= Précy-le-Sec =

- Commune
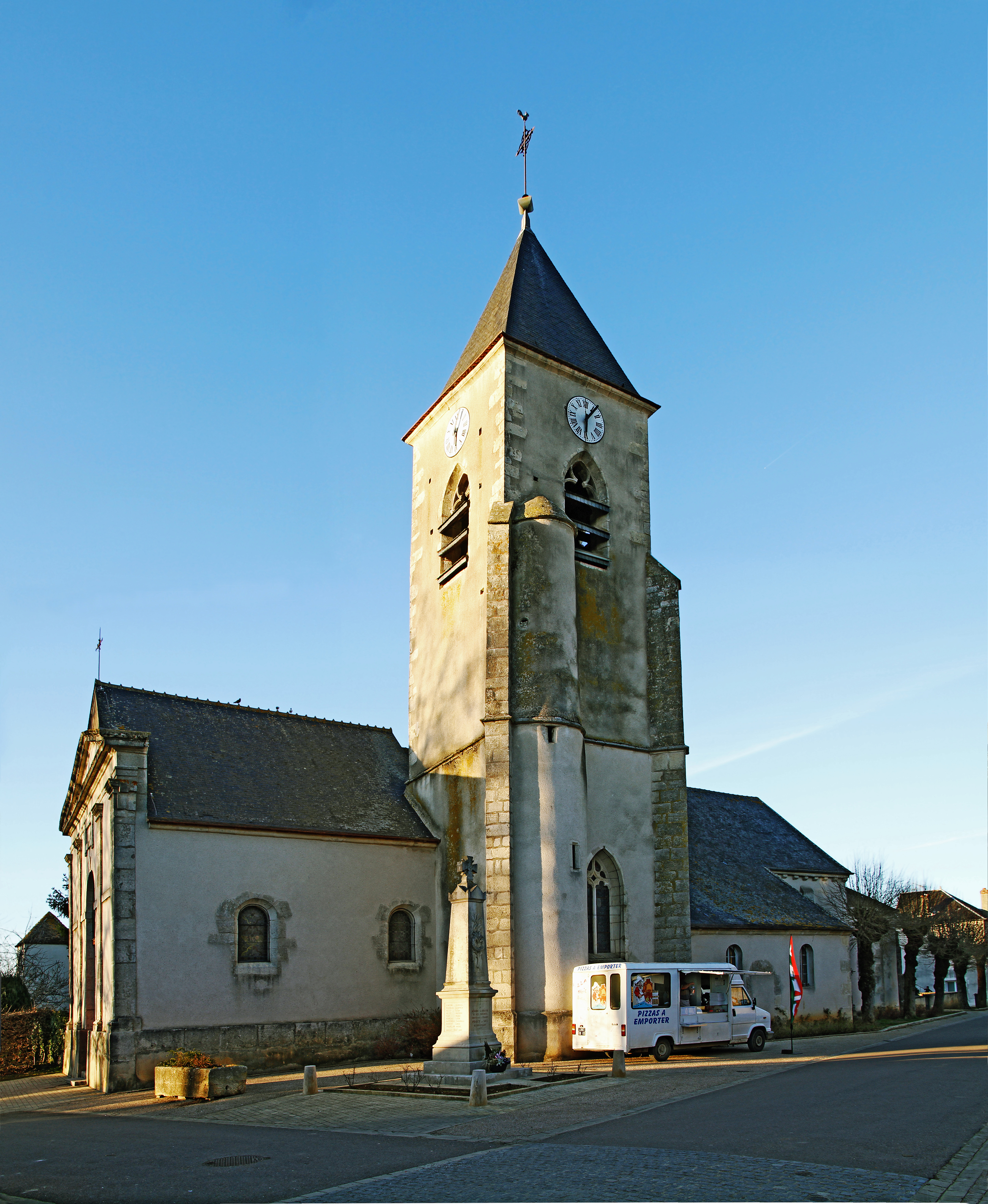
- The church in Précy-le-Sec
- Location of Précy-le-Sec
- Location within France Location within Bourgogne-Franche-Comté
- Coordinates: 47°35′39″N 3°50′00″E
- Country: France
- Region: Bourgogne-Franche-Comté
- Department: Yonne
- Arrondissement: Avallon
- Canton: Joux-la-Ville

Government
  - Mayor (2020–2026): Arnaud Rosier
- Area^{1}: 15.76 km^{2} (6.08 sq mi)
- Highest elevation: 311 m (1,020 ft)
- Lowest elevation: 135 m (443 ft)
- Population (2023): 233
  - Density: 14.8/km^{2} (38.3/sq mi)
- Time zone: UTC+01:00 (CET)
  - Summer (DST): UTC+02:00 (CEST)
- INSEE/Postal code: 89312 /89440
- ^{1} French Land Register data, which excludes lakes, ponds, glaciers > 1 km^{2} (0.386 sq mi or 247 acres) and river estuaries.

Précy-le-Sec (French pronunciation: [pʁesi lə sɛk]) is a commune in the Yonne department in Bourgogne-Franche-Comté in north-central France.

== See also ==
- Communes of the Yonne department
