= Bazarnes =

- Commune
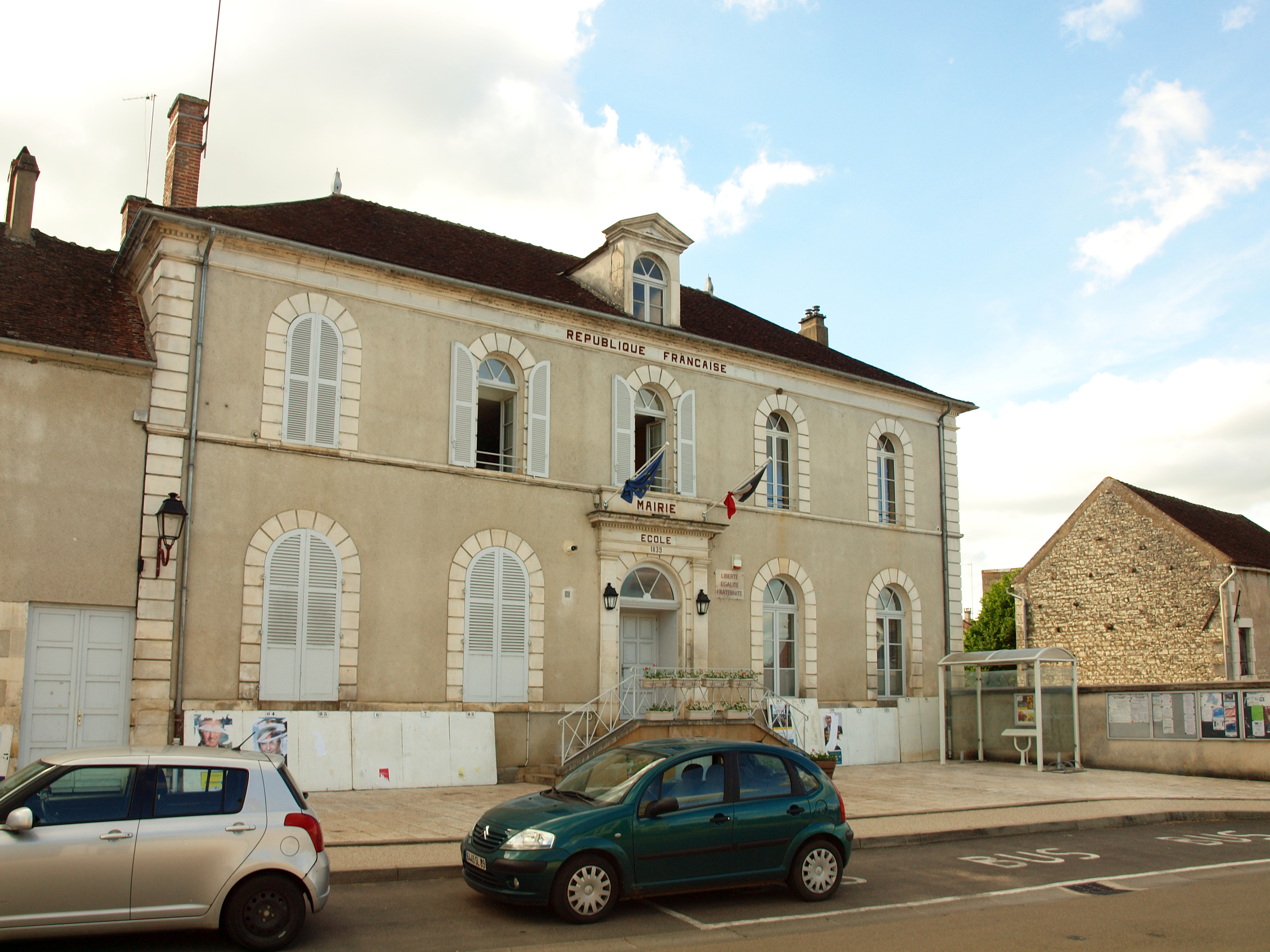
- The town hall in Bazarnes

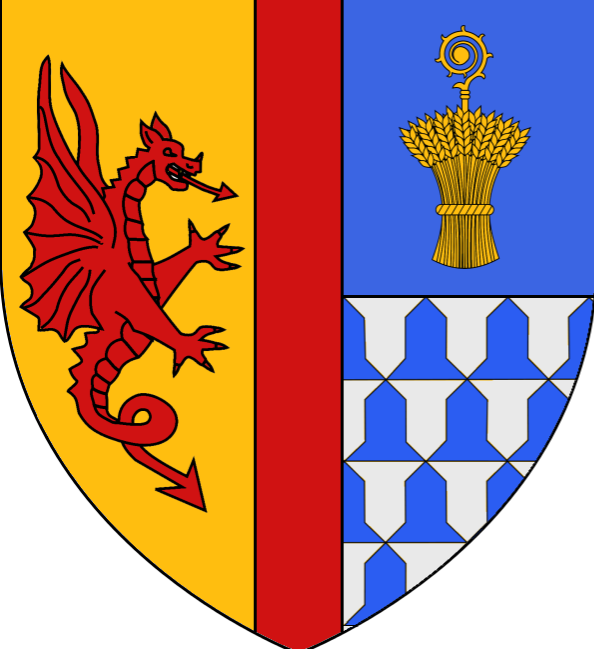
- Coat of arms
- Location of Bazarnes
- Location within France Location within Bourgogne-Franche-Comté
- Coordinates: 47°39′41″N 3°39′49″E
- Country: France
- Region: Bourgogne-Franche-Comté
- Department: Yonne
- Arrondissement: Auxerre
- Canton: Joux-la-Ville

Government
  - Mayor (2020–2026): Thierry Olivier
- Area^{1}: 19.39 km^{2} (7.49 sq mi)
- Highest elevation: 282 m (925 ft)
- Lowest elevation: 109 m (358 ft)
- Population (2023): 422
  - Density: 21.8/km^{2} (56.4/sq mi)
- Time zone: UTC+01:00 (CET)
  - Summer (DST): UTC+02:00 (CEST)
- INSEE/Postal code: 89030 /89460
- ^{1} French Land Register data, which excludes lakes, ponds, glaciers > 1 km^{2} (0.386 sq mi or 247 acres) and river estuaries.

Bazarnes (French pronunciation: [bazaʁn]) is a commune in the Yonne department in Bourgogne-Franche-Comté in north-central France. It lies 165 km away from the capital city of France, Paris. It is also 17 km away from Auxerre.

== See also ==
- Communes of the Yonne department
