= Communes of the Yonne department =

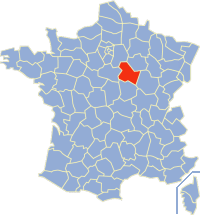

The following is a list of the 423 communes of the Yonne department of France.

The communes cooperate in the following intercommunalities (as of 2025):

- Communauté d'agglomération de l'Auxerrois
- Communauté d'agglomération du Grand Sénonais
- Communauté de communes de l'Agglomération Migennoise
- Communauté de communes de l'Aillantais
- Communauté de communes Avallon - Vézelay - Morvan
- Communauté de communes Chablis Villages et Terroirs
- Communauté de communes de la Cléry, du Betz et de l'Ouanne (partly)
- Communauté de communes du Gâtinais en Bourgogne
- Communauté de communes Haut Nivernais-Val d'Yonne (partly)
- Communauté de communes du Jovinien
- Communauté de communes de Puisaye-Forterre (partly)
- Communauté de communes du Serein
- Communauté de communes Serein et Armance
- Communauté de communes Le Tonnerrois en Bourgogne
- Communauté de communes de la Vanne et du Pays d'Othe
- Communauté de communes Yonne Nord

| INSEE code | Postal code | Commune |
|---|---|---|
| 89002 | 89800 | Aigremont |
| 89004 | 89390 | Aisy-sur-Armançon |
| 89005 | 89160 | Ancy-le-Franc |
| 89006 | 89160 | Ancy-le-Libre |
| 89007 | 89480 | Andryes |
| 89008 | 89440 | Angely |
| 89009 | 89200 | Annay-la-Côte |
| 89010 | 89310 | Annay-sur-Serein |
| 89011 | 89200 | Annéot |
| 89012 | 89440 | Annoux |
| 89013 | 89380 | Appoigny |
| 89014 | 89320 | Arces-Dilo |
| 89015 | 89270 | Arcy-sur-Cure |
| 89016 | 89160 | Argentenay |
| 89017 | 89160 | Argenteuil-sur-Armançon |
| 89018 | 89500 | Armeau |
| 89019 | 89740 | Arthonnay |
| 89020 | 89660 | Asnières-sous-Bois |
| 89021 | 89450 | Asquins |
| 89022 | 89440 | Athie |
| 89023 | 89290 | Augy |
| 89024 | 89000 | Auxerre |
| 89025 | 89200 | Avallon |
| 89027 | 89190 | Bagneaux |
| 89028 | 89430 | Baon |
| 89029 | 89400 | Bassou |
| 89030 | 89460 | Bazarnes |
| 89031 | 89250 | Beaumont |
| 89032 | 89630 | Beauvilliers |
| 89033 | 89240 | Beauvoir |
| 89034 | 89800 | Beine |
| 89035 | 89210 | Bellechaume |
| 89036 | 89150 | La Belliole |
| 89037 | 89410 | Béon |
| 89038 | 89360 | Bernouil |
| 89039 | 89700 | Béru |
| 89040 | 89270 | Bessy-sur-Cure |
| 89041 | 89570 | Beugnon |
| 89042 | 89420 | Bierry-les-Belles-Fontaines |
| 89043 | 89440 | Blacy |
| 89044 | 89200 | Blannay |
| 89045 | 89230 | Bleigny-le-Carreau |
| 89046 | 89220 | Bléneau |
| 89048 | 89770 | Bœurs-en-Othe |
| 89049 | 89660 | Bois-d'Arcy |
| 89050 | 89400 | Bonnard |
| 89051 | 89500 | Les Bordes |
| 89053 | 89113 | Branches |
| 89054 | 89150 | Brannay |
| 89055 | 89210 | Brienon-sur-Armançon |
| 89056 | 89400 | Brion |
| 89057 | 89660 | Brosses |
| 89058 | 89630 | Bussières |
| 89059 | 89400 | Bussy-en-Othe |
| 89060 | 89500 | Bussy-le-Repos |
| 89061 | 89360 | Butteaux |
| 89062 | 89360 | Carisey |
| 89063 | 89116 | La Celle-Saint-Cyr |
| 89064 | 89310 | Censy |
| 89065 | 89320 | Cérilly |
| 89066 | 89320 | Cerisiers |
| 89067 | 89410 | Cézy |
| 89068 | 89800 | Chablis |
| 89069 | 89770 | Chailley |
| 89071 | 89660 | Chamoux |
| 89072 | 89220 | Champcevrais |
| 89073 | 89350 | Champignelles |
| 89074 | 89340 | Champigny |
| 89075 | 89300 | Champlay |
| 89076 | 89210 | Champlost |
| 89077 | 89290 | Champs-sur-Yonne |
| 89079 | 89300 | Chamvres |
| 89080 | 89260 | La Chapelle-sur-Oreuse |
| 89081 | 89800 | La Chapelle-Vaupelteigne |
| 89083 | 89113 | Charbuy |
| 89084 | 89580 | Charentenay |
| 89085 | 89400 | Charmoy |
| 89086 | 89120 | Charny-Orée-de-Puisaye |
| 89087 | 89160 | Chassignelles |
| 89088 | 89110 | Chassy |
| 89089 | 89630 | Chastellux-sur-Cure |
| 89091 | 89660 | Châtel-Censoir |
| 89092 | 89310 | Châtel-Gérard |
| 89093 | 89340 | Chaumont |
| 89094 | 89500 | Chaumot |
| 89095 | 89800 | Chemilly-sur-Serein |
| 89096 | 89250 | Chemilly-sur-Yonne |
| 89098 | 89700 | Cheney |
| 89099 | 89400 | Cheny |
| 89100 | 89690 | Chéroy |
| 89101 | 89600 | Chéu |
| 89102 | 89240 | Chevannes |
| 89104 | 89800 | Chichée |
| 89105 | 89400 | Chichery |
| 89108 | 89530 | Chitry |
| 89111 | 89190 | Les Clérimois |
| 89112 | 89700 | Collan |
| 89113 | 89100 | Collemiers |
| 89115 | 89140 | Compigny |
| 89116 | 89500 | Cornant |
| 89117 | 89580 | Coulangeron |
| 89118 | 89580 | Coulanges-la-Vineuse |
| 89119 | 89480 | Coulanges-sur-Yonne |
| 89120 | 89320 | Coulours |
| 89122 | 89190 | Courgenay |
| 89123 | 89800 | Courgis |
| 89124 | 89140 | Courlon-sur-Yonne |
| 89125 | 89560 | Courson-les-Carrières |
| 89126 | 89150 | Courtoin |
| 89127 | 89100 | Courtois-sur-Yonne |
| 89128 | 89440 | Coutarnoux |
| 89129 | 89480 | Crain |
| 89131 | 89740 | Cruzy-le-Châtel |
| 89132 | 89390 | Cry |
| 89133 | 89116 | Cudot |
| 89134 | 89420 | Cussy-les-Forges |
| 89136 | 89140 | Cuy |
| 89137 | 89700 | Dannemoine |
| 89130 | 89460 | Deux Rivières |
| 89139 | 89240 | Diges |
| 89141 | 89440 | Dissangis |
| 89142 | 89500 | Dixmont |
| 89143 | 89150 | Dollot |
| 89144 | 89150 | Domats |
| 89145 | 89450 | Domecy-sur-Cure |
| 89146 | 89200 | Domecy-sur-le-Vault |
| 89147 | 89130 | Dracy |
| 89148 | 89560 | Druyes-les-Belles-Fontaines |
| 89149 | 89360 | Dyé |
| 89150 | 89240 | Égleny |
| 89151 | 89500 | Égriselles-le-Bocage |
| 89152 | 89400 | Épineau-les-Voves |
| 89153 | 89700 | Épineuil |
| 89154 | 89240 | Escamps |
| 89155 | 89290 | Escolives-Sainte-Camille |
| 89156 | 89210 | Esnon |
| 89158 | 89480 | Étais-la-Sauvin |
| 89159 | 89200 | Étaule |
| 89160 | 89510 | Étigny |
| 89161 | 89310 | Étivey |
| 89162 | 89140 | Évry |
| 89163 | 89110 | La Ferté-Loupière |
| 89164 | 89480 | Festigny |
| 89165 | 89190 | Flacy |
| 89167 | 89113 | Fleury-la-Vallée |
| 89168 | 89800 | Fleys |
| 89169 | 89360 | Flogny-la-Chapelle |
| 89170 | 89450 | Foissy-lès-Vézelay |
| 89171 | 89190 | Foissy-sur-Vanne |
| 89172 | 89100 | Fontaine-la-Gaillarde |
| 89173 | 89130 | Fontaines |
| 89175 | 89800 | Fontenay-près-Chablis |
| 89176 | 89450 | Fontenay-près-Vézelay |
| 89177 | 89660 | Fontenay-sous-Fouronnes |
| 89179 | 89520 | Fontenoy |
| 89180 | 89150 | Fouchères |
| 89181 | 89320 | Fournaudin |
| 89182 | 89560 | Fouronnes |
| 89183 | 89310 | Fresnes |
| 89184 | 89160 | Fulvy |
| 89186 | 89600 | Germigny |
| 89187 | 89160 | Gigny |
| 89188 | 89200 | Girolles |
| 89189 | 89140 | Gisy-les-Nobles |
| 89190 | 89200 | Givry |
| 89191 | 89740 | Gland |
| 89194 | 89310 | Grimault |
| 89195 | 89100 | Gron |
| 89197 | 89420 | Guillon-Terre-Plaine |
| 89198 | 89250 | Gurgy |
| 89199 | 89580 | Gy-l'Évêque |
| 89200 | 89250 | Hauterive |
| 89405 | 89560 | Les Hauts de Forterre |
| 89201 | 89550 | Héry |
| 89202 | 89290 | Irancy |
| 89203 | 89200 | Island |
| 89204 | 89440 | L'Isle-sur-Serein |
| 89205 | 89360 | Jaulges |
| 89206 | 89300 | Joigny |
| 89207 | 89310 | Jouancy |
| 89208 | 89440 | Joux-la-Ville |
| 89209 | 89150 | Jouy |
| 89210 | 89160 | Jully |
| 89211 | 89700 | Junay |
| 89212 | 89290 | Jussy |
| 89214 | 89190 | Lailly |
| 89215 | 89560 | Lain |
| 89216 | 89520 | Lainsecq |
| 89217 | 89130 | Lalande |
| 89218 | 89400 | Laroche-Saint-Cydroine |
| 89219 | 89570 | Lasson |
| 89220 | 89170 | Lavau |
| 89221 | 89130 | Leugny |
| 89222 | 89520 | Levis |
| 89223 | 89160 | Lézinnes |
| 89224 | 89800 | Lichères-près-Aigremont |
| 89225 | 89660 | Lichères-sur-Yonne |
| 89226 | 89800 | Lignorelles |
| 89227 | 89144 | Ligny-le-Châtel |
| 89228 | 89240 | Lindry |
| 89229 | 89140 | Lixy |
| 89230 | 89300 | Looze |
| 89232 | 89200 | Lucy-le-Bois |
| 89233 | 89270 | Lucy-sur-Cure |
| 89234 | 89480 | Lucy-sur-Yonne |
| 89235 | 89200 | Magny |
| 89236 | 89100 | Maillot |
| 89237 | 89270 | Mailly-la-Ville |
| 89238 | 89660 | Mailly-le-Château |
| 89239 | 89100 | Malay-le-Grand |
| 89240 | 89100 | Malay-le-Petit |
| 89242 | 89800 | Maligny |

| INSEE code | Postal code | Commune |
|---|---|---|
| 89244 | 89420 | Marmeaux |
| 89245 | 89500 | Marsangy |
| 89246 | 89440 | Massangis |
| 89247 | 89430 | Mélisey |
| 89248 | 89450 | Menades |
| 89249 | 89210 | Mercy |
| 89250 | 89144 | Méré |
| 89251 | 89110 | Merry-la-Vallée |
| 89252 | 89560 | Merry-Sec |
| 89253 | 89660 | Merry-sur-Yonne |
| 89254 | 89130 | Mézilles |
| 89255 | 89140 | Michery |
| 89256 | 89580 | Migé |
| 89257 | 89400 | Migennes |
| 89259 | 89310 | Môlay |
| 89261 | 89190 | Molinons |
| 89262 | 89700 | Molosmes |
| 89263 | 89470 | Monéteau |
| 89264 | 89150 | Montacher-Villegardin |
| 89003 | 89110 | Montholon |
| 89265 | 89230 | Montigny-la-Resle |
| 89266 | 89660 | Montillot |
| 89267 | 89420 | Montréal |
| 89268 | 89250 | Mont-Saint-Sulpice |
| 89270 | 89560 | Mouffy |
| 89271 | 89310 | Moulins-en-Tonnerrois |
| 89272 | 89130 | Moulins-sur-Ouanne |
| 89273 | 89520 | Moutiers-en-Puisaye |
| 89274 | 89100 | Nailly |
| 89276 | 89570 | Neuvy-Sautour |
| 89277 | 89310 | Nitry |
| 89278 | 89320 | Noé |
| 89279 | 89310 | Noyers |
| 89280 | 89390 | Nuits |
| 89281 | 89110 | Les Ormes |
| 89282 | 89400 | Ormoy |
| 89283 | 89560 | Ouanne |
| 89284 | 89160 | Pacy-sur-Armançon |
| 89285 | 89140 | Pailly |
| 89286 | 89240 | Parly |
| 89287 | 89100 | Paron |
| 89288 | 89210 | Paroy-en-Othe |
| 89289 | 89300 | Paroy-sur-Tholon |
| 89290 | 89310 | Pasilly |
| 89291 | 89510 | Passy |
| 89469 | 89260 | Perceneige |
| 89292 | 89360 | Percey |
| 89295 | 89000 | Perrigny |
| 89296 | 89390 | Perrigny-sur-Armançon |
| 89297 | 89450 | Pierre-Perthuis |
| 89298 | 89330 | Piffonds |
| 89299 | 89740 | Pimelles |
| 89300 | 89420 | Pisy |
| 89302 | 89140 | Plessis-Saint-Jean |
| 89303 | 89310 | Poilly-sur-Serein |
| 89304 | 89110 | Poilly-sur-Tholon |
| 89306 | 89200 | Pontaubert |
| 89307 | 89230 | Pontigny |
| 89308 | 89190 | Pont-sur-Vanne |
| 89309 | 89140 | Pont-sur-Yonne |
| 89310 | 89260 | La Postolle |
| 89311 | 89240 | Pourrain |
| 89312 | 89440 | Précy-le-Sec |
| 89313 | 89116 | Précy-sur-Vrin |
| 89314 | 89460 | Prégilbert |
| 89315 | 89800 | Préhy |
| 89316 | 89200 | Provency |
| 89318 | 89630 | Quarré-les-Tombes |
| 89319 | 89290 | Quenne |
| 89320 | 89740 | Quincerot |
| 89321 | 89390 | Ravières |
| 89323 | 89700 | Roffey |
| 89324 | 89220 | Rogny-les-Sept-Écluses |
| 89325 | 89170 | Ronchères |
| 89326 | 89100 | Rosoy |
| 89327 | 89500 | Rousson |
| 89328 | 89230 | Rouvray |
| 89329 | 89430 | Rugny |
| 89331 | 89520 | Sainpuits |
| 89332 | 89340 | Saint-Agnan |
| 89333 | 89420 | Saint-André-en-Terre-Plaine |
| 89335 | 89300 | Saint-Aubin-sur-Yonne |
| 89336 | 89630 | Saint-Brancher |
| 89337 | 89530 | Saint-Bris-le-Vineux |
| 89338 | 89100 | Saint-Clément |
| 89341 | 89800 | Saint-Cyr-les-Colons |
| 89342 | 89100 | Saint-Denis-lès-Sens |
| 89339 | 89440 | Sainte-Colombe |
| 89351 | 89420 | Sainte-Magnance |
| 89363 | 89460 | Sainte-Pallaye |
| 89371 | 89310 | Sainte-Vertu |
| 89344 | 89170 | Saint-Fargeau |
| 89345 | 89600 | Saint-Florentin |
| 89346 | 89000 | Saint-Georges-sur-Baulche |
| 89347 | 89630 | Saint-Germain-des-Champs |
| 89348 | 89330 | Saint-Julien-du-Sault |
| 89349 | 89630 | Saint-Léger-Vauban |
| 89350 | 89330 | Saint-Loup-d'Ordon |
| 89352 | 89170 | Saint-Martin-des-Champs |
| 89353 | 89330 | Saint-Martin-d'Ordon |
| 89354 | 89100 | Saint-Martin-du-Tertre |
| 89355 | 89700 | Saint-Martin-sur-Armançon |
| 89359 | 89190 | Saint-Maurice-aux-Riches-Hommes |
| 89360 | 89110 | Saint-Maurice-le-Vieil |
| 89361 | 89110 | Saint-Maurice-Thizouaille |
| 89362 | 89270 | Saint-Moré |
| 89364 | 89450 | Saint-Père |
| 89365 | 89220 | Saint-Privé |
| 89367 | 89520 | Saints-en-Puisaye |
| 89368 | 89520 | Saint-Sauveur-en-Puisaye |
| 89369 | 89140 | Saint-Sérotin |
| 89370 | 89150 | Saint-Valérien |
| 89373 | 89100 | Saligny |
| 89374 | 89160 | Sambourg |
| 89375 | 89420 | Santigny |
| 89376 | 89310 | Sarry |
| 89377 | 89420 | Sauvigny-le-Beuréal |
| 89378 | 89200 | Sauvigny-le-Bois |
| 89379 | 89420 | Savigny-en-Terre-Plaine |
| 89380 | 89150 | Savigny-sur-Clairis |
| 89382 | 89250 | Seignelay |
| 89383 | 89560 | Sementron |
| 89384 | 89710 | Senan |
| 89385 | 89160 | Sennevoy-le-Bas |
| 89386 | 89160 | Sennevoy-le-Haut |
| 89387 | 89100 | Sens |
| 89388 | 89116 | Sépeaux-Saint-Romain |
| 89390 | 89140 | Serbonnes |
| 89391 | 89140 | Sergines |
| 89392 | 89200 | Sermizelles |
| 89393 | 89700 | Serrigny |
| 89394 | 89270 | Sery |
| 89395 | 89190 | Les Sièges |
| 89397 | 89110 | Sommecaise |
| 89398 | 89570 | Sormery |
| 89399 | 89100 | Soucy |
| 89400 | 89520 | Sougères-en-Puisaye |
| 89402 | 89570 | Soumaintrain |
| 89403 | 89160 | Stigny |
| 89404 | 89100 | Subligny |
| 89406 | 89420 | Talcy |
| 89407 | 89430 | Tanlay |
| 89408 | 89350 | Tannerre-en-Puisaye |
| 89409 | 89450 | Tharoiseau |
| 89410 | 89200 | Tharot |
| 89412 | 89420 | Thizy |
| 89413 | 89430 | Thorey |
| 89414 | 89260 | Thorigny-sur-Oreuse |
| 89415 | 89200 | Thory |
| 89416 | 89520 | Thury |
| 89417 | 89700 | Tissey |
| 89418 | 89700 | Tonnerre |
| 89419 | 89130 | Toucy |
| 89420 | 89520 | Treigny-Perreuse-Sainte-Colombe |
| 89422 | 89430 | Trichey |
| 89423 | 89700 | Tronchoy |
| 89424 | 89460 | Trucy-sur-Yonne |
| 89425 | 89570 | Turny |
| 89426 | 89580 | Val-de-Mercy |
| 89334 | 89110 | Le Val-d'Ocre |
| 89427 | 89580 | Vallan |
| 89411 | 89320 | Les Vallées-de-la-Vanne |
| 89428 | 89150 | Vallery |
| 89196 | 89113 | Valravillon |
| 89430 | 89144 | Varennes |
| 89431 | 89420 | Vassy-sous-Pisy |
| 89432 | 89320 | Vaudeurs |
| 89433 | 89200 | Vault-de-Lugny |
| 89434 | 89320 | Vaumort |
| 89436 | 89210 | Venizy |
| 89437 | 89230 | Venouse |
| 89438 | 89290 | Venoy |
| 89439 | 89600 | Vergigny |
| 89440 | 89330 | Verlin |
| 89441 | 89270 | Vermenton |
| 89442 | 89150 | Vernoy |
| 89443 | 89510 | Véron |
| 89445 | 89700 | Vézannes |
| 89446 | 89450 | Vézelay |
| 89447 | 89700 | Vézinnes |
| 89449 | 89340 | Villeblevin |
| 89450 | 89150 | Villebougis |
| 89451 | 89320 | Villechétive |
| 89452 | 89300 | Villecien |
| 89453 | 89240 | Villefargeau |
| 89456 | 89140 | Villemanoche |
| 89458 | 89140 | Villenavotte |
| 89459 | 89150 | Villeneuve-la-Dondagre |
| 89460 | 89340 | Villeneuve-la-Guyard |
| 89461 | 89190 | Villeneuve-l'Archevêque |
| 89462 | 89350 | Villeneuve-les-Genêts |
| 89463 | 89230 | Villeneuve-Saint-Salves |
| 89464 | 89500 | Villeneuve-sur-Yonne |
| 89465 | 89140 | Villeperrot |
| 89466 | 89100 | Villeroy |
| 89467 | 89140 | Villethierry |
| 89468 | 89330 | Villevallier |
| 89470 | 89160 | Villiers-les-Hauts |
| 89471 | 89320 | Villiers-Louis |
| 89472 | 89130 | Villiers-Saint-Benoît |
| 89474 | 89360 | Villiers-Vineux |
| 89475 | 89740 | Villon |
| 89477 | 89800 | Villy |
| 89478 | 89290 | Vincelles |
| 89479 | 89290 | Vincelottes |
| 89480 | 89140 | Vinneuf |
| 89481 | 89160 | Vireaux |
| 89482 | 89700 | Viviers |
| 89483 | 89260 | Voisines |
| 89485 | 89270 | Voutenay-sur-Cure |
| 89486 | 89700 | Yrouerre |
