= Saint-Père, Yonne =

Saint-Père
- Commune
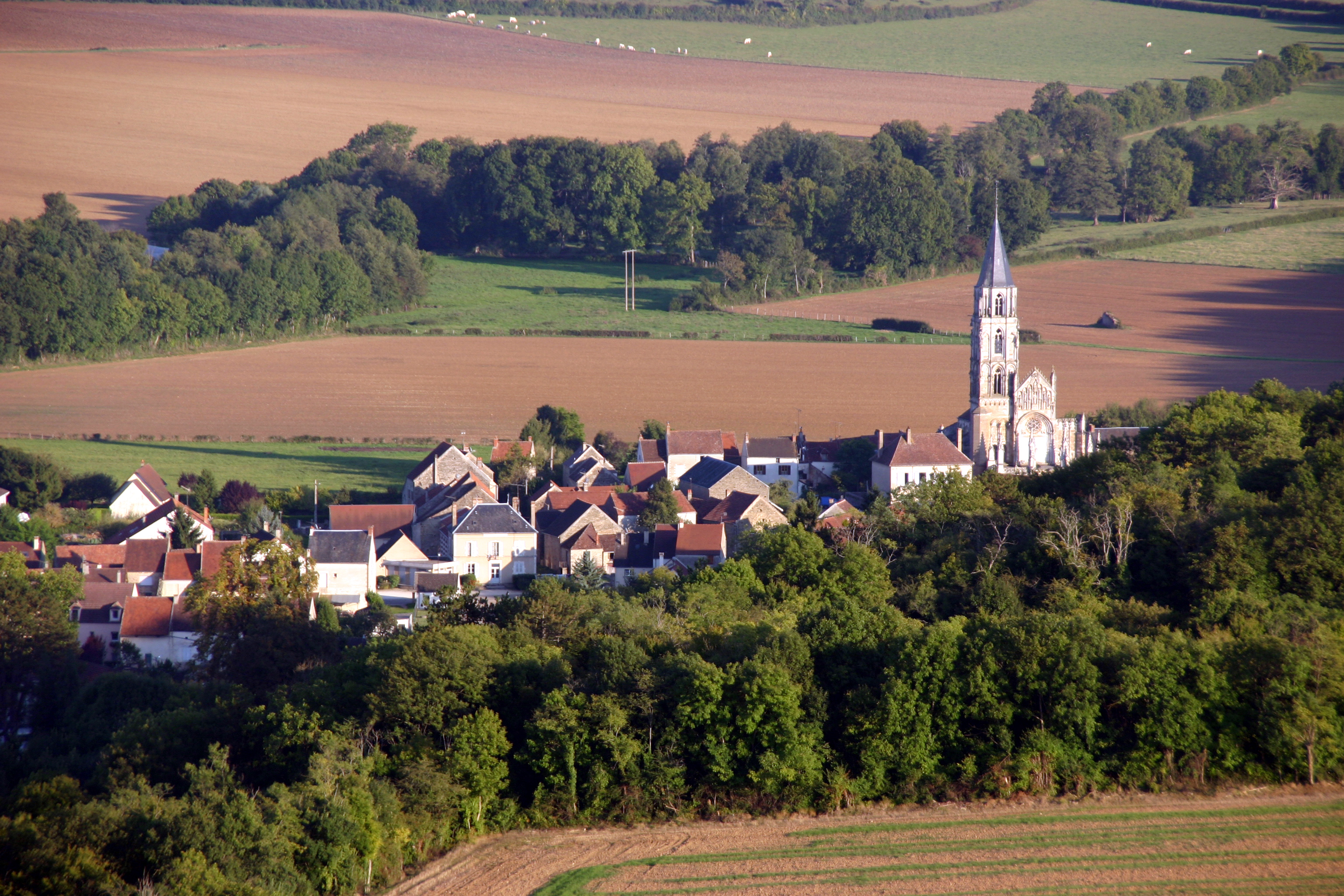
- A general view of Saint-Père
- Location of Saint-Père
- Location within France Location within Bourgogne-Franche-Comté
- Coordinates: 47°27′38″N 3°45′57″E
- Country: France
- Region: Bourgogne-Franche-Comté
- Department: Yonne
- Arrondissement: Avallon
- Canton: Joux-la-Ville

Government
  - Mayor (2020–2026): Christian Guyot
- Area^{1}: 15.28 km^{2} (5.90 sq mi)
- Highest elevation: 359 m (1,178 ft)
- Lowest elevation: 142 m (466 ft)
- Population (2023): 289
  - Density: 18.9/km^{2} (49.0/sq mi)
- Time zone: UTC+01:00 (CET)
  - Summer (DST): UTC+02:00 (CEST)
- INSEE/Postal code: 89364 /89450
- ^{1} French Land Register data, which excludes lakes, ponds, glaciers > 1 km^{2} (0.386 sq mi or 247 acres) and river estuaries.

Saint-Père (French pronunciation: [sɛ̃ pɛʁ]) is a commune in the Yonne department in Bourgogne-Franche-Comté in north-central France.

== See also ==
- Communes of the Yonne department
- Parc naturel régional du Morvan
