= Asquins =

- Commune
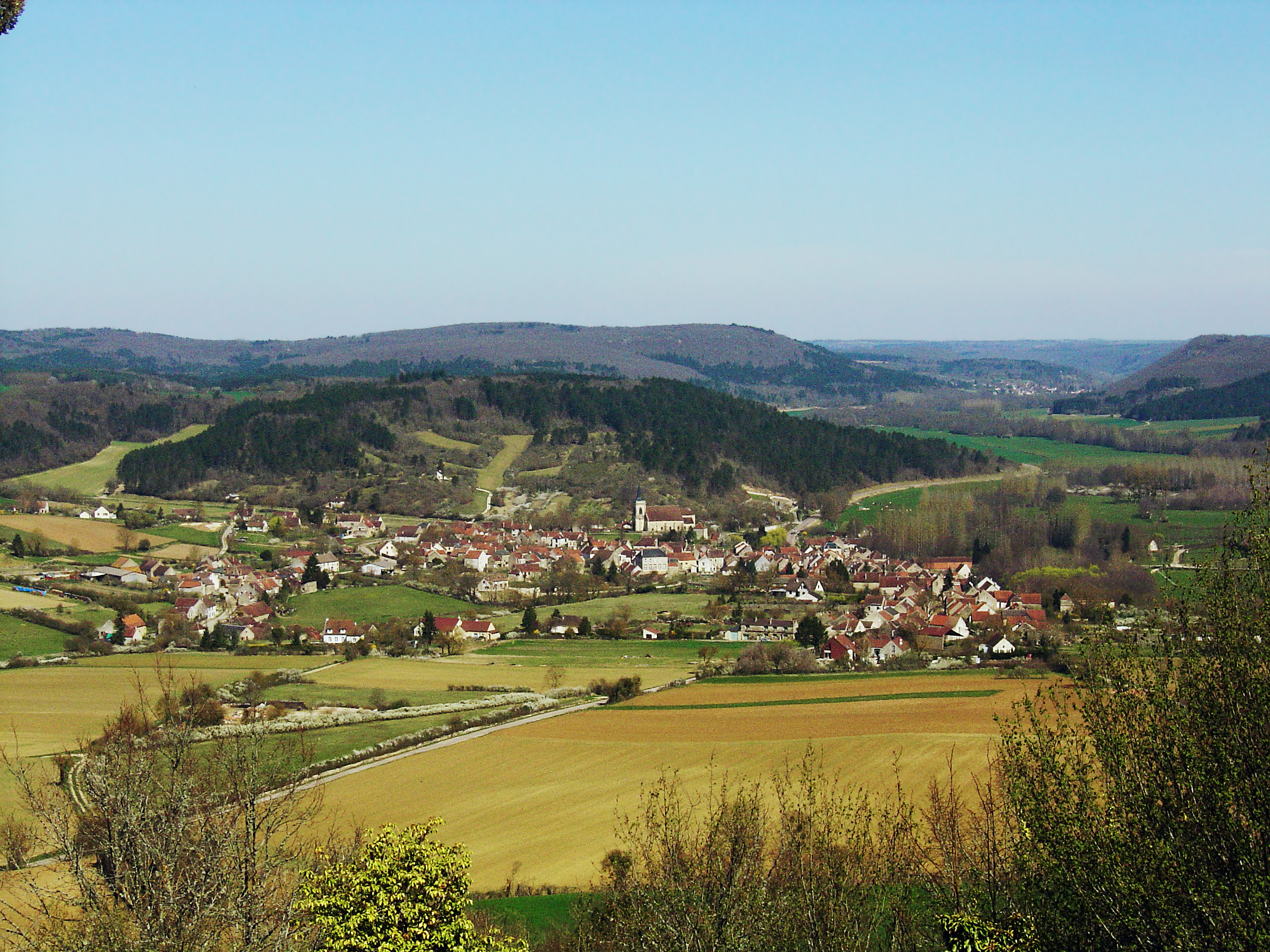
- A general view of Asquins

- Coat of arms
- Location of Asquins
- Location within France Location within Bourgogne-Franche-Comté
- Coordinates: 47°28′52″N 3°45′21″E
- Country: France
- Region: Bourgogne-Franche-Comté
- Department: Yonne
- Arrondissement: Avallon
- Canton: Joux-la-Ville
- Intercommunality: CC Avallon Vézelay Morvan

Government
  - Mayor (2020–2026): Philippe Veyssière
- Area^{1}: 21.60 km^{2} (8.34 sq mi)
- Highest elevation: 331 m (1,086 ft)
- Lowest elevation: 134 m (440 ft)
- Population (2023): 305
  - Density: 14.1/km^{2} (36.6/sq mi)
- Time zone: UTC+01:00 (CET)
  - Summer (DST): UTC+02:00 (CEST)
- INSEE/Postal code: 89021 /89450
- ^{1} French Land Register data, which excludes lakes, ponds, glaciers > 1 km^{2} (0.386 sq mi or 247 acres) and river estuaries.

Asquins (French pronunciation: [askɛ̃]) is a commune in the Yonne department in Bourgogne-Franche-Comté in north-central France.

== See also ==
- Communes of the Yonne department
- Parc naturel régional du Morvan
