= Foissy-lès-Vézelay =

- Commune
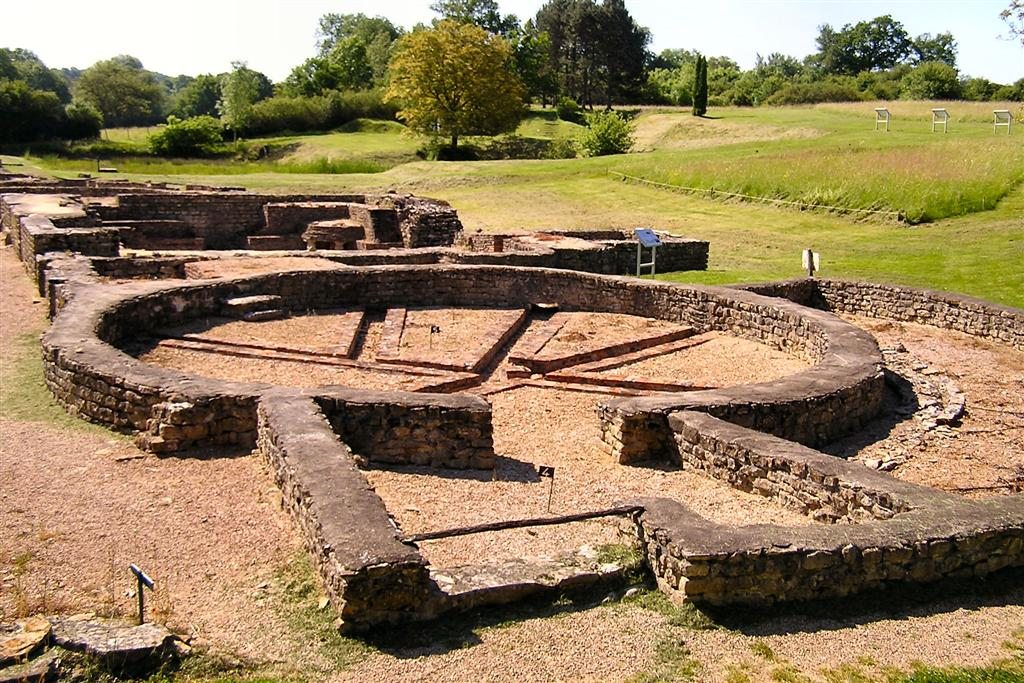
- The Fontaines Salées archeological site in Foissy-lès-Vézelay
- Location of Foissy-lès-Vézelay
- Location within France Location within Bourgogne-Franche-Comté
- Coordinates: 47°26′12″N 3°45′54″E
- Country: France
- Region: Bourgogne-Franche-Comté
- Department: Yonne
- Arrondissement: Avallon
- Canton: Joux-la-Ville

Government
  - Mayor (2020–2026): Patrick Moreau
- Area^{1}: 5.53 km^{2} (2.14 sq mi)
- Highest elevation: 320 m (1,050 ft)
- Lowest elevation: 148 m (486 ft)
- Population (2023): 115
  - Density: 20.8/km^{2} (53.9/sq mi)
- Time zone: UTC+01:00 (CET)
  - Summer (DST): UTC+02:00 (CEST)
- INSEE/Postal code: 89170 /89450
- ^{1} French Land Register data, which excludes lakes, ponds, glaciers > 1 km^{2} (0.386 sq mi or 247 acres) and river estuaries.

Foissy-lès-Vézelay (French pronunciation: [fwasi lɛ vez(ə)lɛ], literally Foissy near Vézelay) is a commune in the Yonne department in Bourgogne-Franche-Comté in north-central France.

== See also ==
- Communes of the Yonne department
- Parc naturel régional du Morvan
