= Chamoux, Yonne =

Chamoux
- Commune
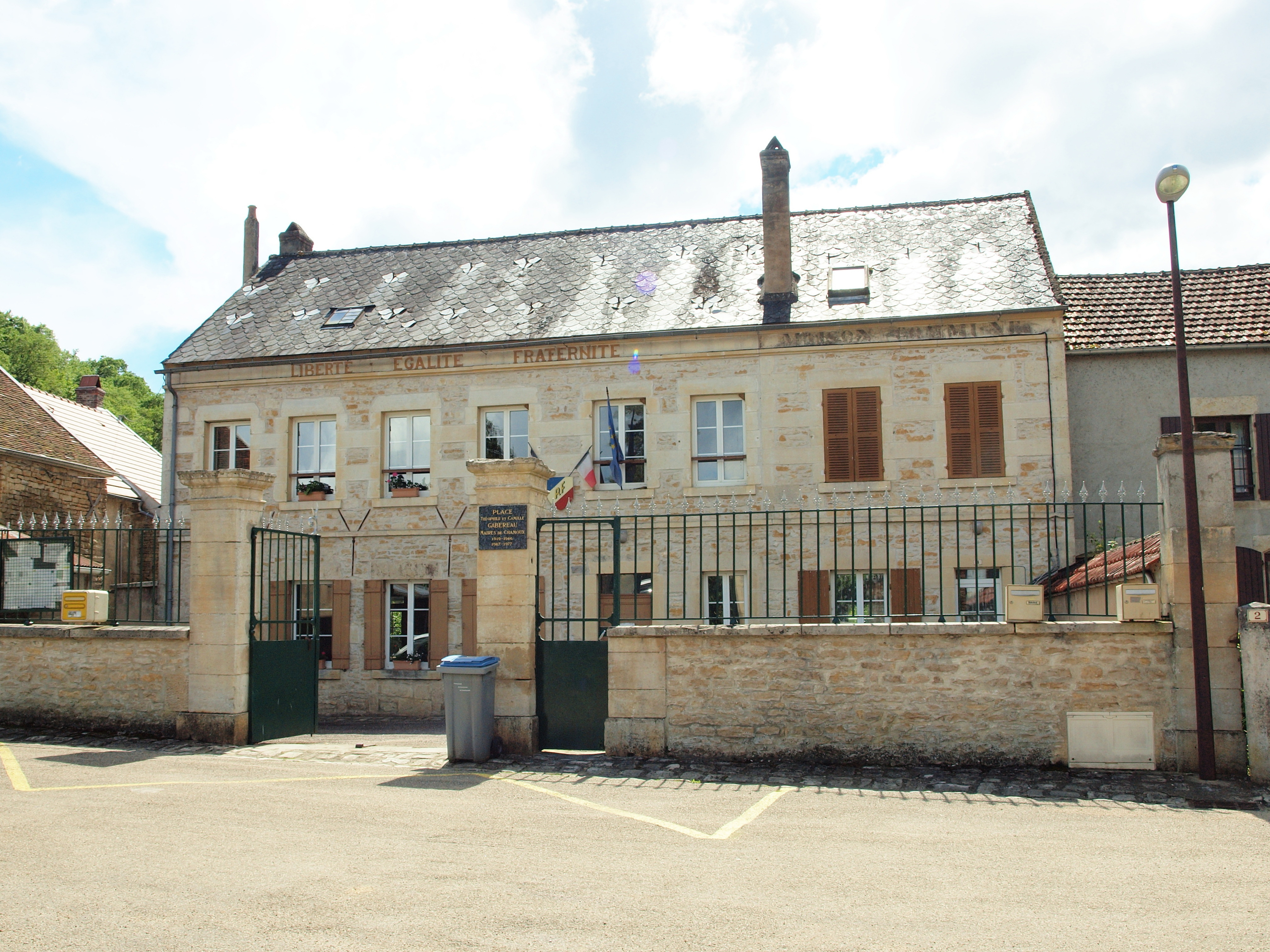
- The town hall in Chamoux
- Location of Chamoux
- Location within France Location within Bourgogne-Franche-Comté
- Coordinates: 47°27′27″N 3°39′47″E
- Country: France
- Region: Bourgogne-Franche-Comté
- Department: Yonne
- Arrondissement: Avallon
- Canton: Joux-la-Ville

Government
  - Mayor (2020–2026): Roger Huard
- Area^{1}: 6.93 km^{2} (2.68 sq mi)
- Highest elevation: 285 m (935 ft)
- Lowest elevation: 190 m (620 ft)
- Population (2023): 94
  - Density: 14/km^{2} (35/sq mi)
- Time zone: UTC+01:00 (CET)
  - Summer (DST): UTC+02:00 (CEST)
- INSEE/Postal code: 89071 /89660
- ^{1} French Land Register data, which excludes lakes, ponds, glaciers > 1 km^{2} (0.386 sq mi or 247 acres) and river estuaries.

Chamoux (French pronunciation: [ʃamu]) is a commune in the Yonne department in Bourgogne-Franche-Comté in north-central France.

Its inhabitants are called Chamoutins.

== Economy ==
The commune lives off of crop and livestock farming, as well as forestry.

== Places and Monuments ==
The pre-historic attraction Cardo Land contains more than 80 life-size sculptures of dinosaurs and prehistoric man. It is the work of the sculptor Cardo.

== See also ==
- Communes of the Yonne department
