= Coulanges-sur-Yonne =

- Commune
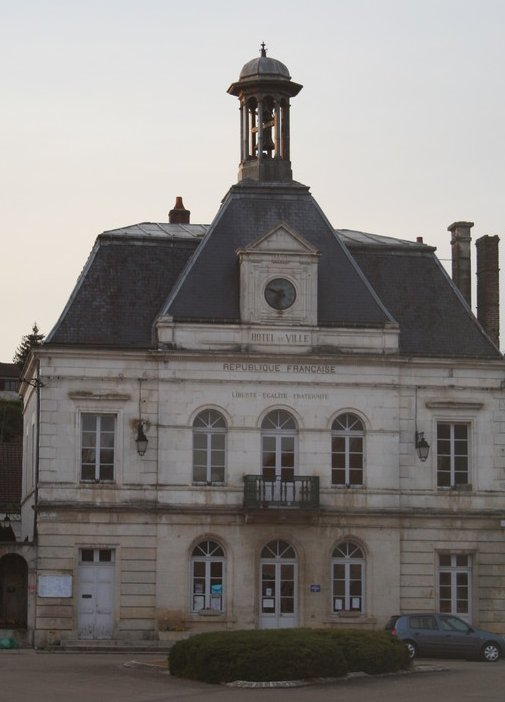
- The town hall in Coulanges-sur-Yonne
- Location of Coulanges-sur-Yonne
- Location within France Location within Bourgogne-Franche-Comté
- Coordinates: 47°31′38″N 3°32′27″E
- Country: France
- Region: Bourgogne-Franche-Comté
- Department: Yonne
- Arrondissement: Auxerre
- Canton: Joux-la-Ville

Government
  - Mayor (2020–2026): Marcel Chevillon
- Area^{1}: 10.58 km^{2} (4.08 sq mi)
- Highest elevation: 220 m (720 ft)
- Lowest elevation: 137 m (449 ft)
- Population (2023): 518
  - Density: 49.0/km^{2} (127/sq mi)
- Time zone: UTC+01:00 (CET)
  - Summer (DST): UTC+02:00 (CEST)
- INSEE/Postal code: 89119 /89480
- ^{1} French Land Register data, which excludes lakes, ponds, glaciers > 1 km^{2} (0.386 sq mi or 247 acres) and river estuaries.

Coulanges-sur-Yonne (French pronunciation: [kulɑ̃ʒ syʁ jɔn], Coulanges on Yonne) is a commune in the Yonne department in Bourgogne-Franche-Comté in north-central France.

== See also ==
- Communes of the Yonne department
