= Blannay =

- Commune
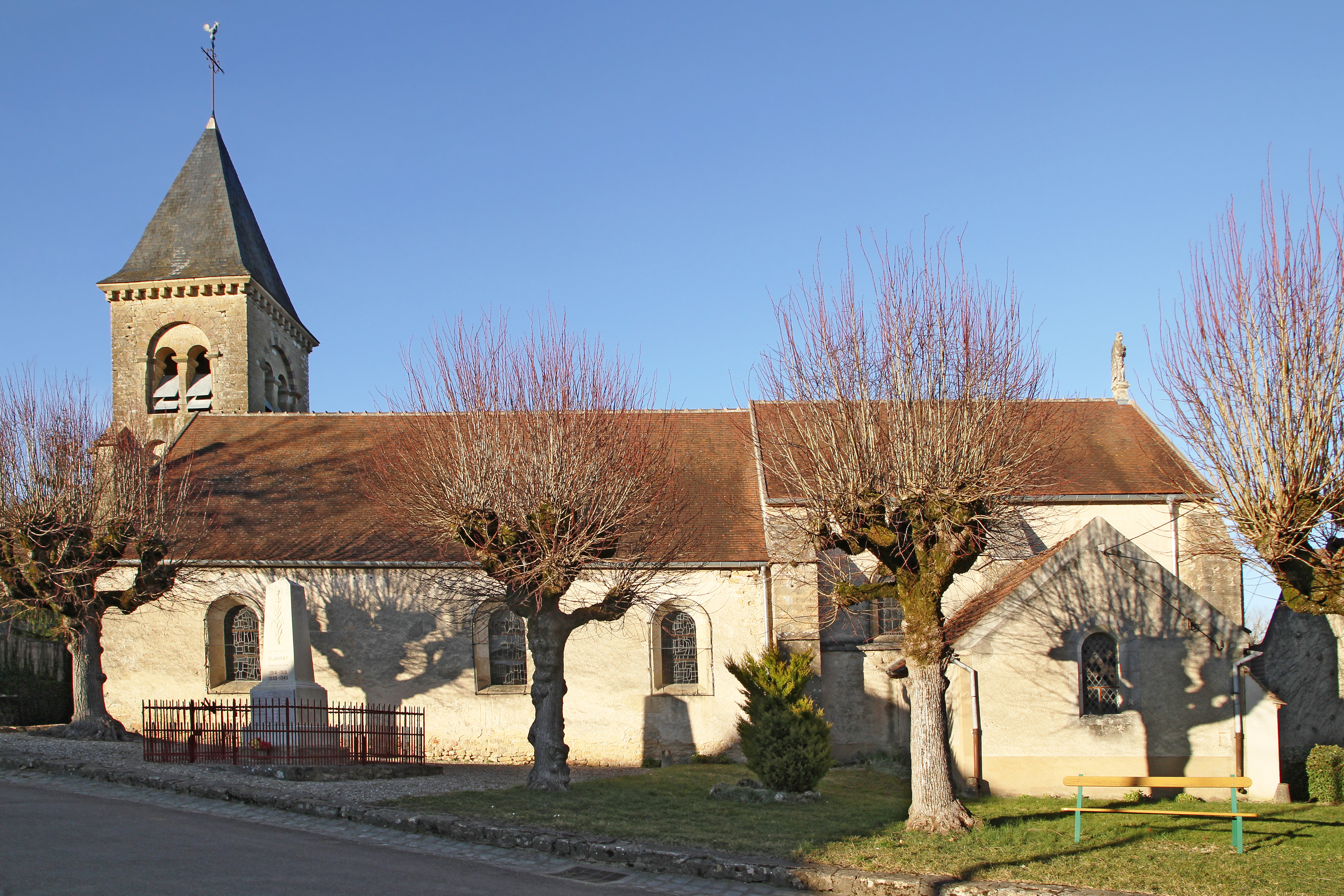
- The church in Blannay
- Location of Blannay
- Location within France Location within Bourgogne-Franche-Comté
- Coordinates: 47°31′46″N 3°46′55″E
- Country: France
- Region: Bourgogne-Franche-Comté
- Department: Yonne
- Arrondissement: Avallon
- Canton: Joux-la-Ville

Government
  - Mayor (2020–2026): Marie-Claire Limosin
- Area^{1}: 7.26 km^{2} (2.80 sq mi)
- Highest elevation: 306 m (1,004 ft)
- Lowest elevation: 132 m (433 ft)
- Population (2023): 105
  - Density: 14.5/km^{2} (37.5/sq mi)
- Time zone: UTC+01:00 (CET)
  - Summer (DST): UTC+02:00 (CEST)
- INSEE/Postal code: 89044 /89200
- ^{1} French Land Register data, which excludes lakes, ponds, glaciers > 1 km^{2} (0.386 sq mi or 247 acres) and river estuaries.

Blannay (French pronunciation: [blanɛ]) is a commune in the Yonne department in Bourgogne-Franche-Comté in north-central France.

== See also ==
- Communes of the Yonne department
