= Montillot =

- Commune
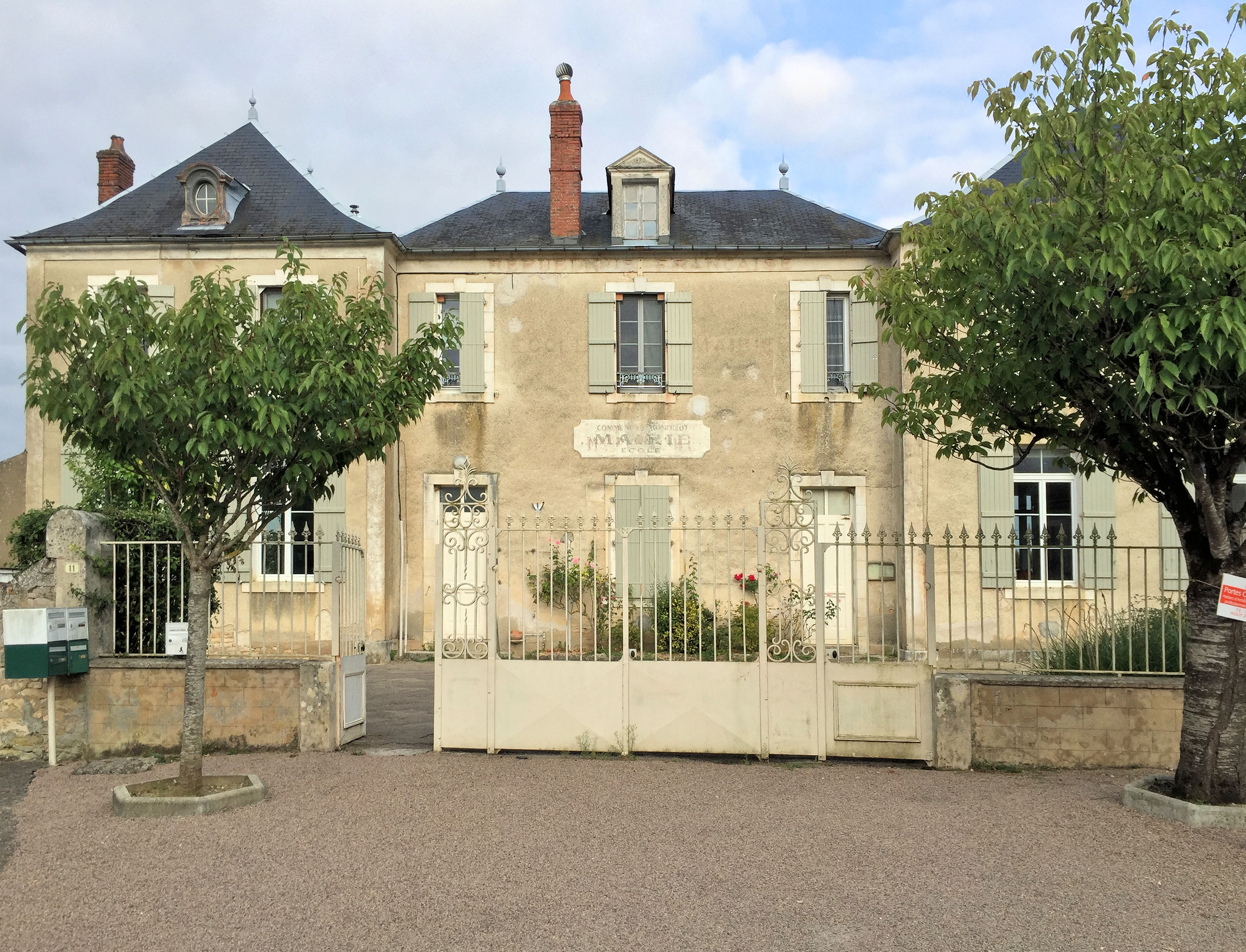
- The town hall in Montillot
- Location of Montillot
- Location within France Location within Bourgogne-Franche-Comté
- Coordinates: 47°31′10″N 3°43′14″E
- Country: France
- Region: Bourgogne-Franche-Comté
- Department: Yonne
- Arrondissement: Avallon
- Canton: Joux-la-Ville

Government
  - Mayor (2020–2026): Catherine Prévost-Chedhomme
- Area^{1}: 22.45 km^{2} (8.67 sq mi)
- Highest elevation: 319 m (1,047 ft)
- Lowest elevation: 132 m (433 ft)
- Population (2023): 247
  - Density: 11.0/km^{2} (28.5/sq mi)
- Time zone: UTC+01:00 (CET)
  - Summer (DST): UTC+02:00 (CEST)
- INSEE/Postal code: 89266 /89660
- ^{1} French Land Register data, which excludes lakes, ponds, glaciers > 1 km^{2} (0.386 sq mi or 247 acres) and river estuaries.

Montillot (French pronunciation: [mɔ̃tijo]) is a commune in the Yonne department in Bourgogne-Franche-Comté in north-central France.

== See also ==
- Communes of the Yonne department
