= Brosses =

- Commune
- Location of Brosses
- Location within France Location within Bourgogne-Franche-Comté
- Coordinates: 47°32′15″N 3°41′31″E
- Country: France
- Region: Bourgogne-Franche-Comté
- Department: Yonne
- Arrondissement: Avallon
- Canton: Joux-la-Ville

Government
  - Mayor (2022–2026): Alain Marc
- Area^{1}: 19.97 km^{2} (7.71 sq mi)
- Highest elevation: 322 m (1,056 ft)
- Lowest elevation: 151 m (495 ft)
- Population (2023): 265
  - Density: 13.3/km^{2} (34.4/sq mi)
- Time zone: UTC+01:00 (CET)
  - Summer (DST): UTC+02:00 (CEST)
- INSEE/Postal code: 89057 /89660
- ^{1} French Land Register data, which excludes lakes, ponds, glaciers > 1 km^{2} (0.386 sq mi or 247 acres) and river estuaries.

Brosses (French pronunciation: [bʁɔs]) is a commune in the Yonne department in Bourgogne-Franche-Comté in north-central France.

== See also ==
- Communes of the Yonne department
