= Tharoiseau =

- Commune
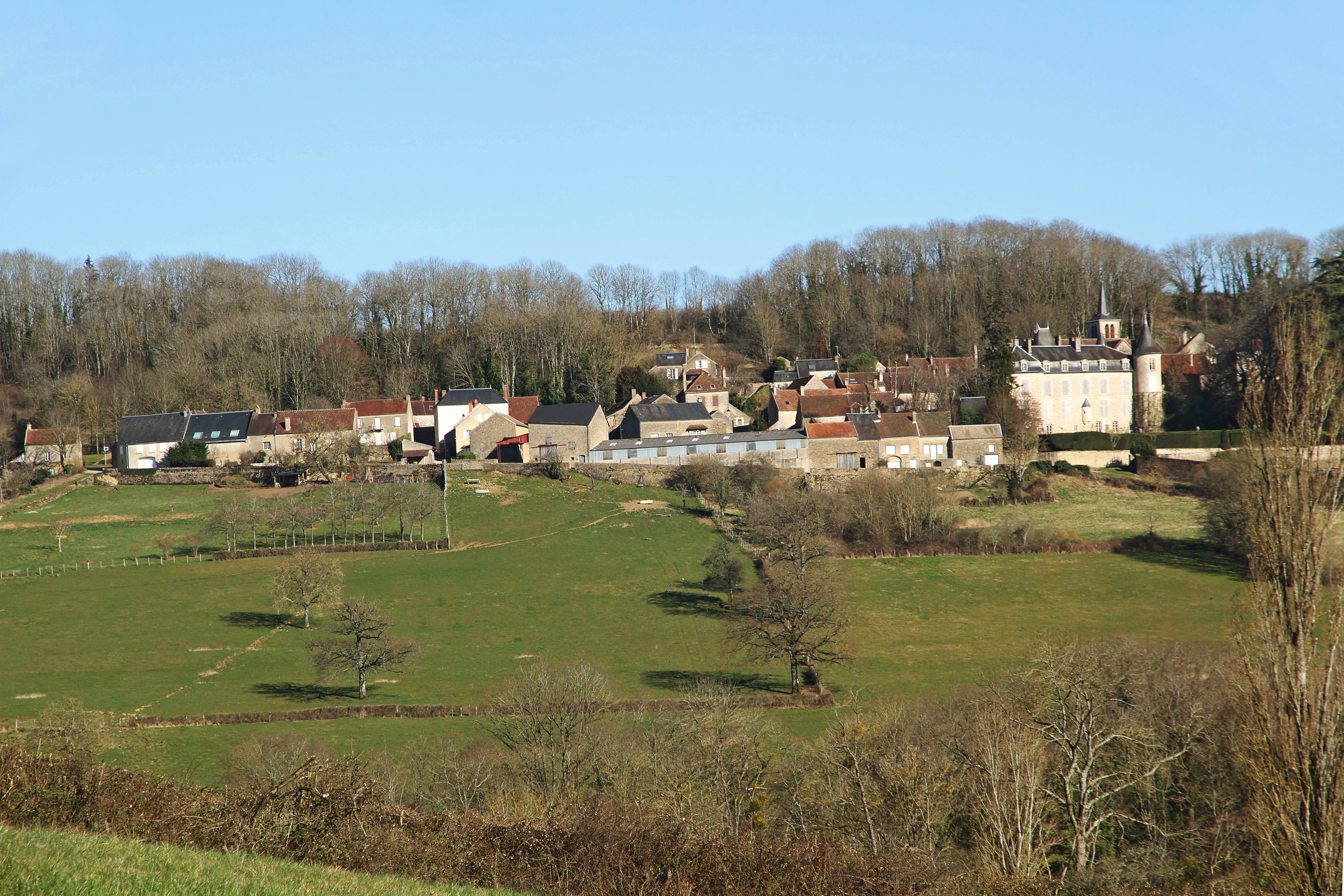
- A general view of Tharoiseau
- Location of Tharoiseau
- Location within France Location within Bourgogne-Franche-Comté
- Coordinates: 47°27′48″N 3°48′20″E
- Country: France
- Region: Bourgogne-Franche-Comté
- Department: Yonne
- Arrondissement: Avallon
- Canton: Joux-la-Ville

Government
  - Mayor (2020–2026): Jean-Michel Beauger
- Area^{1}: 3.43 km^{2} (1.32 sq mi)
- Highest elevation: 344 m (1,129 ft)
- Lowest elevation: 205 m (673 ft)
- Population (2023): 66
  - Density: 19/km^{2} (50/sq mi)
- Time zone: UTC+01:00 (CET)
  - Summer (DST): UTC+02:00 (CEST)
- INSEE/Postal code: 89409 /89450
- ^{1} French Land Register data, which excludes lakes, ponds, glaciers > 1 km^{2} (0.386 sq mi or 247 acres) and river estuaries.

Tharoiseau (French pronunciation: [taʁwazo]) is a commune in the Yonne department in Bourgogne-Franche-Comté in north-central France.

== See also ==
- Communes of the Yonne department
- Parc naturel régional du Morvan
