= Lucy-sur-Yonne =

- Commune
- Location of Lucy-sur-Yonne
- Location within France Location within Bourgogne-Franche-Comté
- Coordinates: 47°31′29″N 3°35′02″E
- Country: France
- Region: Bourgogne-Franche-Comté
- Department: Yonne
- Arrondissement: Auxerre
- Canton: Joux-la-Ville

Government
  - Mayor (2020–2026): Éric Fiala
- Area^{1}: 8.19 km^{2} (3.16 sq mi)
- Highest elevation: 210 m (690 ft)
- Lowest elevation: 132 m (433 ft)
- Population (2023): 126
  - Density: 15.4/km^{2} (39.8/sq mi)
- Time zone: UTC+01:00 (CET)
  - Summer (DST): UTC+02:00 (CEST)
- INSEE/Postal code: 89234 /89480
- ^{1} French Land Register data, which excludes lakes, ponds, glaciers > 1 km^{2} (0.386 sq mi or 247 acres) and river estuaries.

Lucy-sur-Yonne (French pronunciation: [lysi syʁ jɔn]) is a commune in the Yonne department in Bourgogne-Franche-Comté in north-central France.

== See also ==
- Communes of the Yonne department
