= Bois-d'Arcy, Yonne =

Bois-d'Arcy
- Commune
- Location of Bois-d'Arcy
- Location within France Location within Bourgogne-Franche-Comté
- Coordinates: 47°32′52″N 3°43′02″E
- Country: France
- Region: Bourgogne-Franche-Comté
- Department: Yonne
- Arrondissement: Avallon
- Canton: Joux-la-Ville

Government
  - Mayor (2020–2026): Stéphane Berthelot
- Area^{1}: 3.48 km^{2} (1.34 sq mi)
- Highest elevation: 288 m (945 ft)
- Lowest elevation: 175 m (574 ft)
- Population (2023): 24
  - Density: 6.9/km^{2} (18/sq mi)
- Time zone: UTC+01:00 (CET)
  - Summer (DST): UTC+02:00 (CEST)
- INSEE/Postal code: 89049 /89660
- ^{1} French Land Register data, which excludes lakes, ponds, glaciers > 1 km^{2} (0.386 sq mi or 247 acres) and river estuaries.

Bois-d'Arcy (French pronunciation: [bwa daʁsi]) is a commune in the Yonne department in Bourgogne-Franche-Comté in north-central France.

== See also ==
- Communes of the Yonne department
