= Saint-Moré =

- Commune
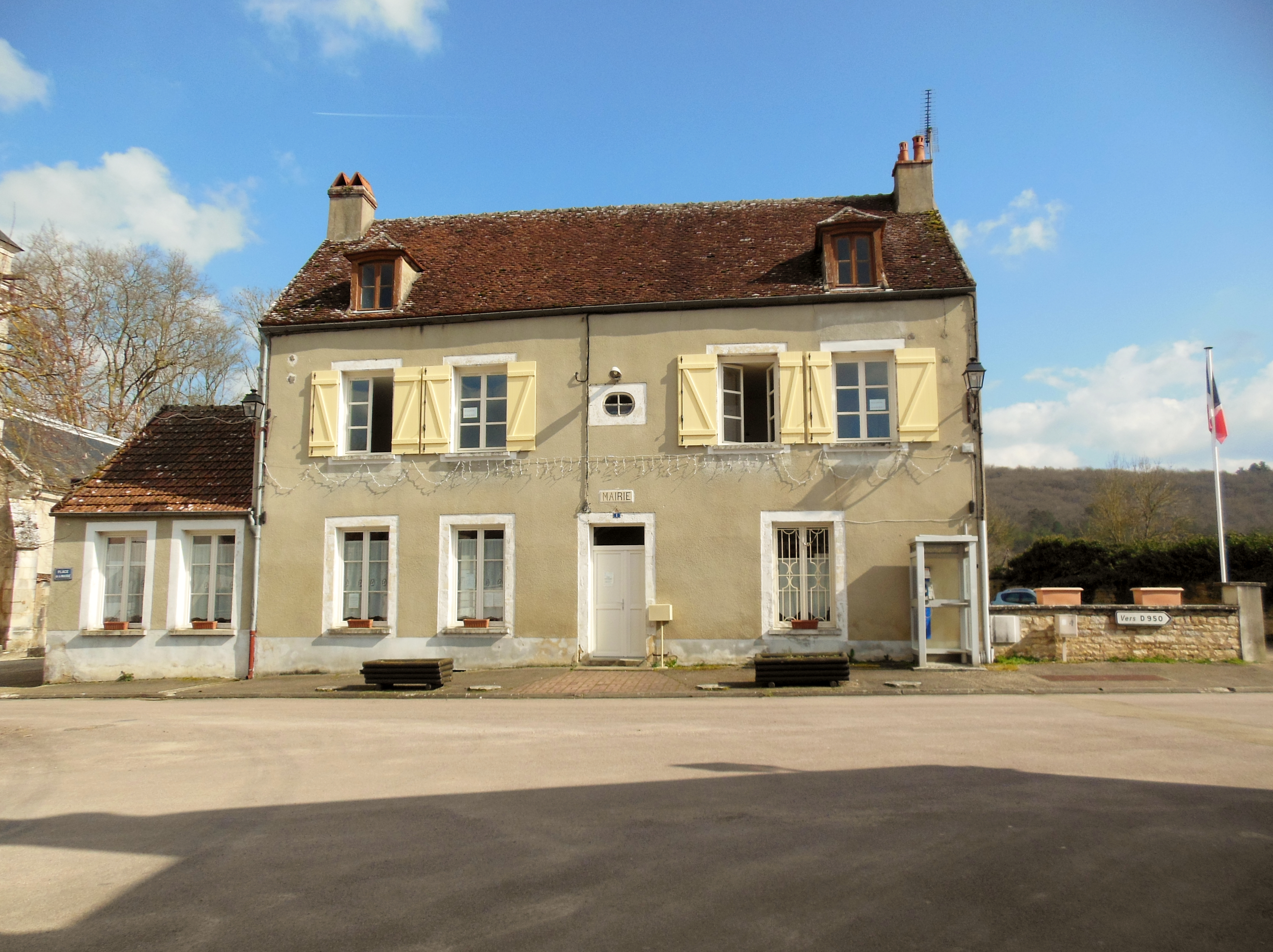
- The town hall in Saint-Moré
- Location of Saint-Moré
- Location within France Location within Bourgogne-Franche-Comté
- Coordinates: 47°34′37″N 3°46′35″E
- Country: France
- Region: Bourgogne-Franche-Comté
- Department: Yonne
- Arrondissement: Avallon
- Canton: Joux-la-Ville

Government
  - Mayor (2020–2026): Monique Millereaux
- Area^{1}: 11.98 km^{2} (4.63 sq mi)
- Highest elevation: 262 m (860 ft)
- Lowest elevation: 122 m (400 ft)
- Population (2023): 176
  - Density: 14.7/km^{2} (38.0/sq mi)
- Time zone: UTC+01:00 (CET)
  - Summer (DST): UTC+02:00 (CEST)
- INSEE/Postal code: 89362 /89270
- ^{1} French Land Register data, which excludes lakes, ponds, glaciers > 1 km^{2} (0.386 sq mi or 247 acres) and river estuaries.

Saint-Moré (French pronunciation: [sɛ̃ mɔʁe]) is a commune in the Yonne department in Bourgogne-Franche-Comté in north-central France.

== See also ==
- Communes of the Yonne department
