= Dissangis =

- Commune
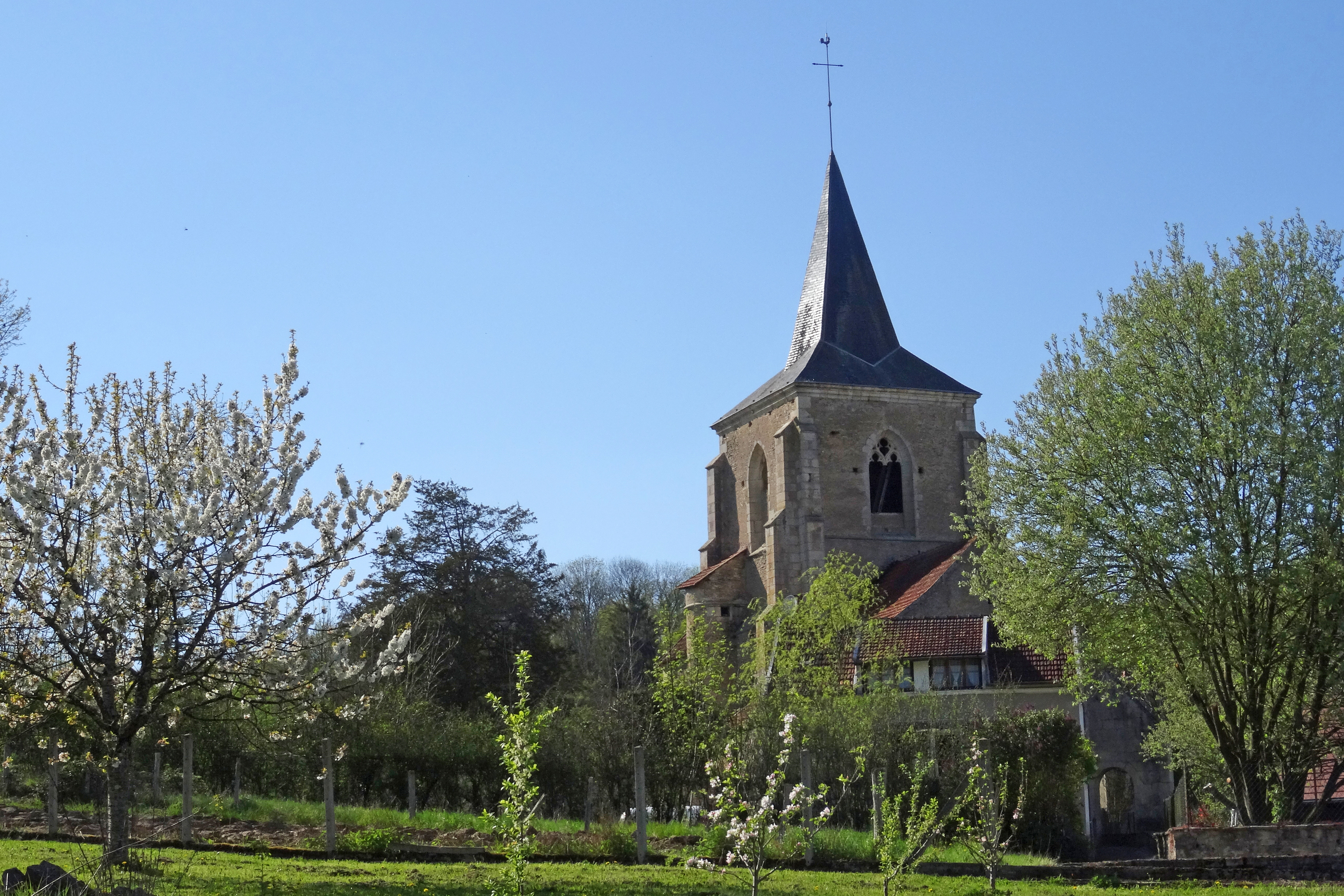
- The church in Dissangis
- Location of Dissangis
- Location within France Location within Bourgogne-Franche-Comté
- Coordinates: 47°35′52″N 3°58′58″E
- Country: France
- Region: Bourgogne-Franche-Comté
- Department: Yonne
- Arrondissement: Avallon
- Canton: Joux-la-Ville
- Area^{1}: 7.33 km^{2} (2.83 sq mi)
- Highest elevation: 279 m (915 ft)
- Lowest elevation: 190 m (620 ft)
- Population (2023): 119
  - Density: 16.2/km^{2} (42.0/sq mi)
- Time zone: UTC+01:00 (CET)
  - Summer (DST): UTC+02:00 (CEST)
- INSEE/Postal code: 89141 /89440
- ^{1} French Land Register data, which excludes lakes, ponds, glaciers > 1 km^{2} (0.386 sq mi or 247 acres) and river estuaries.

Dissangis is a commune in the Yonne department in Bourgogne-Franche-Comté in north-central France.

== See also ==
- Communes of the Yonne department
