= Joux-la-Ville =

- Commune
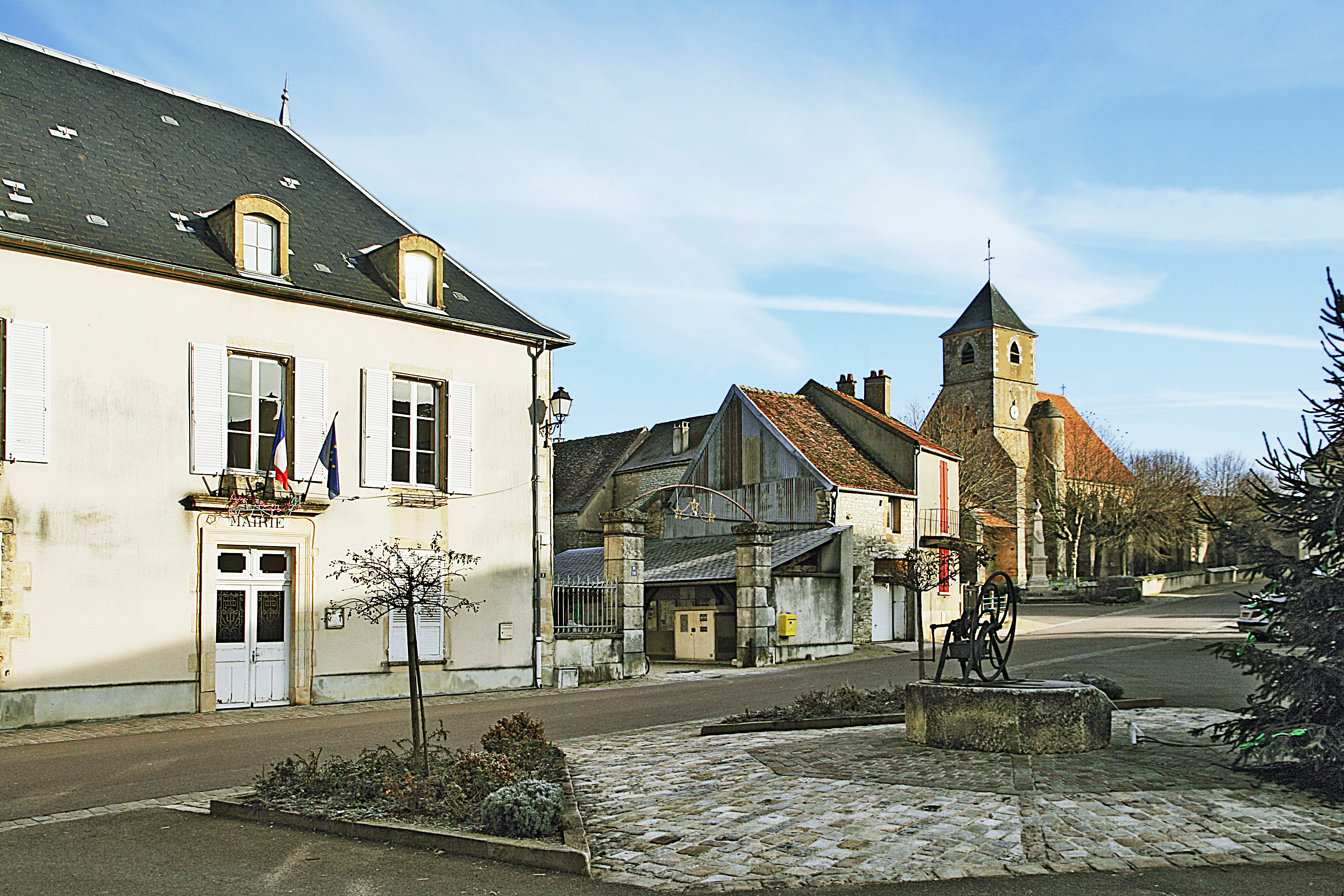
- The town hall and church in Joux-la-Ville

- Coat of arms
- Location of Joux-la-Ville
- Location within France Location within Bourgogne-Franche-Comté
- Coordinates: 47°37′24″N 3°51′47″E
- Country: France
- Region: Bourgogne-Franche-Comté
- Department: Yonne
- Arrondissement: Avallon
- Canton: Joux-la-Ville

Government
  - Mayor (2023–2026): Jean-Pierre Carré
- Area^{1}: 43.81 km^{2} (16.92 sq mi)
- Highest elevation: 339 m (1,112 ft)
- Lowest elevation: 183 m (600 ft)
- Population (2023): 1,175
  - Density: 26.82/km^{2} (69.46/sq mi)
- Time zone: UTC+01:00 (CET)
  - Summer (DST): UTC+02:00 (CEST)
- INSEE/Postal code: 89208 /89440
- Website: www.jouxlaville.fr
- ^{1} French Land Register data, which excludes lakes, ponds, glaciers > 1 km^{2} (0.386 sq mi or 247 acres) and river estuaries.

Joux-la-Ville (French pronunciation: [ʒu la vil]; lit. 'Joux-the-City') is a commune in the Yonne department in Bourgogne-Franche-Comté in north-central France.

== See also ==
- Communes of the Yonne department
