= Asnières-sous-Bois =

- Commune
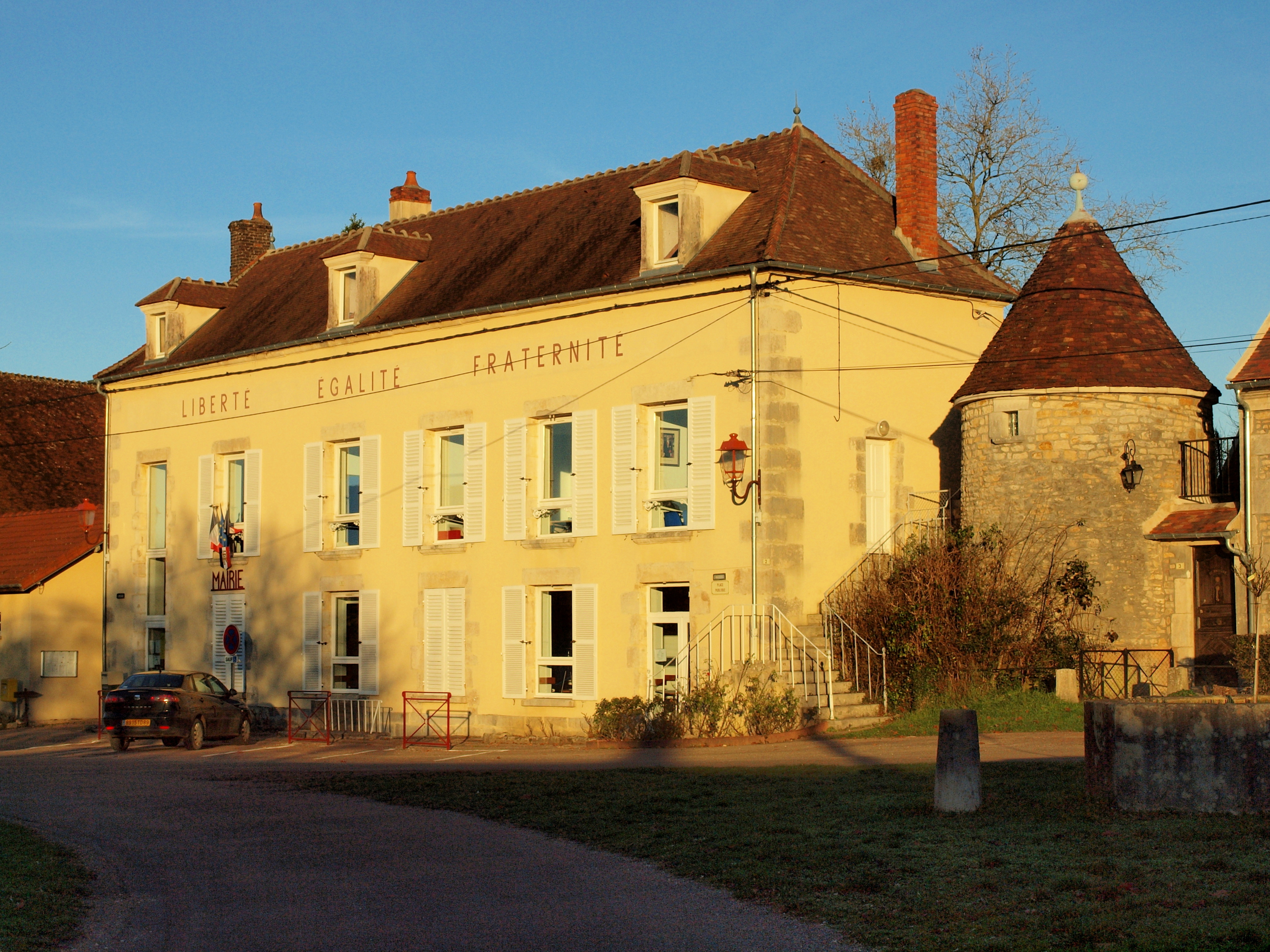
- The town hall in Asnières-sous-Bois
- Location of Asnières-sous-Bois
- Location within France Location within Bourgogne-Franche-Comté
- Coordinates: 47°29′01″N 3°38′59″E
- Country: France
- Region: Bourgogne-Franche-Comté
- Department: Yonne
- Arrondissement: Avallon
- Canton: Joux-la-Ville
- Intercommunality: CC Avallon - Vézelay - Morvan

Government
  - Mayor (2020–2026): François Roux
- Area^{1}: 17.95 km^{2} (6.93 sq mi)
- Highest elevation: 272 m (892 ft)
- Lowest elevation: 162 m (531 ft)
- Population (2023): 113
  - Density: 6.30/km^{2} (16.3/sq mi)
- Time zone: UTC+01:00 (CET)
  - Summer (DST): UTC+02:00 (CEST)
- INSEE/Postal code: 89020 /89660
- ^{1} French Land Register data, which excludes lakes, ponds, glaciers > 1 km^{2} (0.386 sq mi or 247 acres) and river estuaries.

Asnières-sous-Bois (French pronunciation: [ɑnjɛʁ su bwa]) is a commune in the Yonne department in Bourgogne-Franche-Comté in north-central France.

== See also ==
- Communes of the Yonne department
