= Trucy-sur-Yonne =

- Commune
- Location of Trucy-sur-Yonne
- Location within France Location within Bourgogne-Franche-Comté
- Coordinates: 47°37′44″N 3°39′38″E
- Country: France
- Region: Bourgogne-Franche-Comté
- Department: Yonne
- Arrondissement: Auxerre
- Canton: Joux-la-Ville

Government
  - Mayor (2020–2026): Bernard Partonnaud
- Area^{1}: 8.31 km^{2} (3.21 sq mi)
- Highest elevation: 239 m (784 ft)
- Lowest elevation: 116 m (381 ft)
- Population (2023): 132
  - Density: 15.9/km^{2} (41.1/sq mi)
- Time zone: UTC+01:00 (CET)
  - Summer (DST): UTC+02:00 (CEST)
- INSEE/Postal code: 89424 /89460
- ^{1} French Land Register data, which excludes lakes, ponds, glaciers > 1 km^{2} (0.386 sq mi or 247 acres) and river estuaries.

Trucy-sur-Yonne (French pronunciation: [tʁysi syʁ jɔn], literally Trucy on Yonne) is a commune in the Yonne department in Bourgogne-Franche-Comté in north-central France.

== See also ==
- Communes of the Yonne department
