= Crain, Yonne =

Crain
- Commune
- Coat of arms
- Location of Crain
- Location within France Location within Bourgogne-Franche-Comté
- Coordinates: 47°31′51″N 3°33′17″E
- Country: France
- Region: Bourgogne-Franche-Comté
- Department: Yonne
- Arrondissement: Auxerre
- Canton: Joux-la-Ville

Government
  - Mayor (2023–2026): Jacky Coignet
- Area^{1}: 9.90 km^{2} (3.82 sq mi)
- Highest elevation: 207 m (679 ft)
- Lowest elevation: 132 m (433 ft)
- Population (2023): 410
  - Density: 41/km^{2} (110/sq mi)
- Time zone: UTC+01:00 (CET)
  - Summer (DST): UTC+02:00 (CEST)
- INSEE/Postal code: 89129 /89480
- ^{1} French Land Register data, which excludes lakes, ponds, glaciers > 1 km^{2} (0.386 sq mi or 247 acres) and river estuaries.

Crain (French pronunciation: [kʁɛ̃]) is a commune in the Yonne department in Bourgogne-Franche-Comté in north-central France.

== See also ==
- Communes of the Yonne department
