= Prégilbert =

- Commune
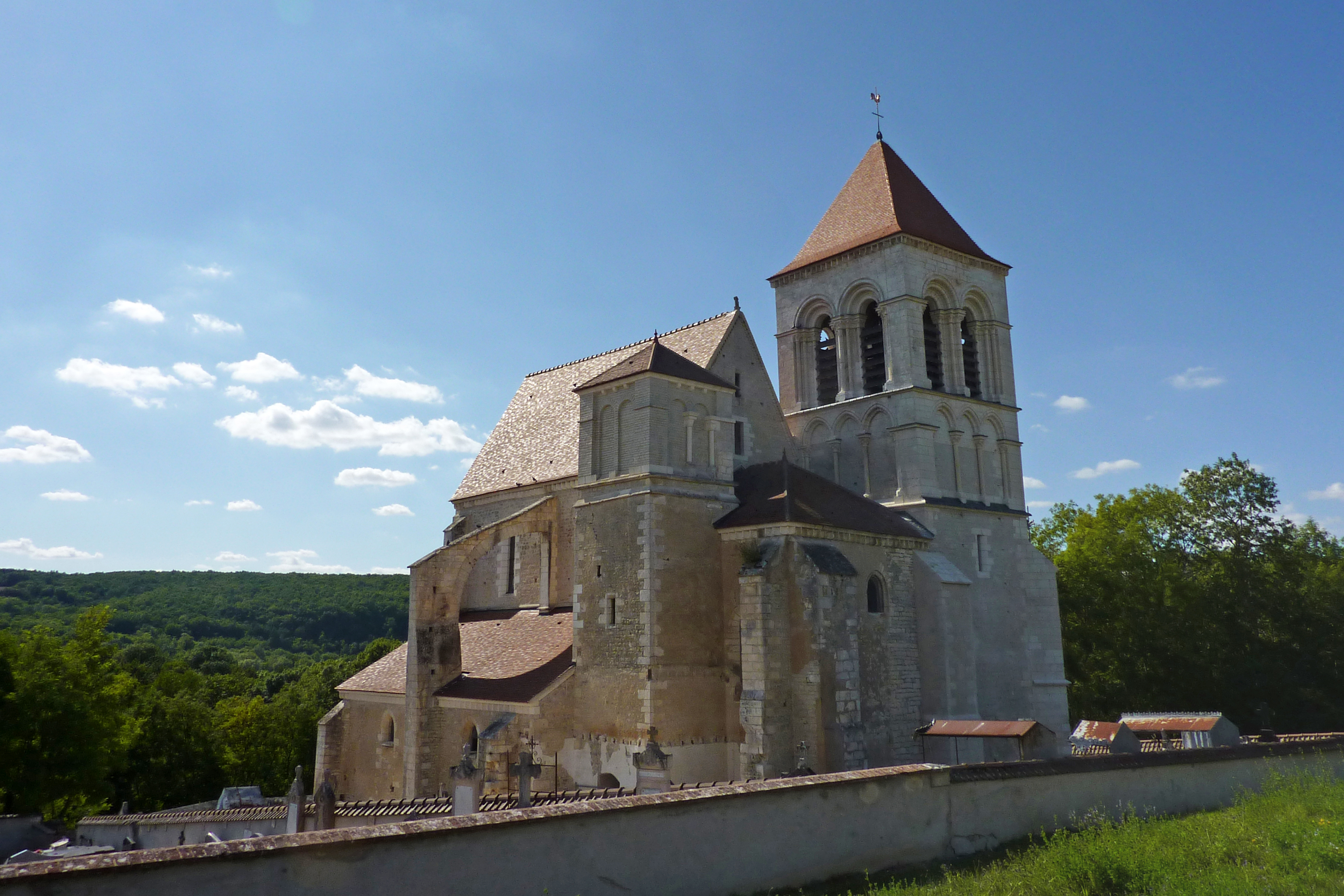
- The church in Prégilbert
- Location of Prégilbert
- Location within France Location within Bourgogne-Franche-Comté
- Coordinates: 47°38′29″N 3°40′02″E
- Country: France
- Region: Bourgogne-Franche-Comté
- Department: Yonne
- Arrondissement: Auxerre
- Canton: Joux-la-Ville

Government
  - Mayor (2020–2026): Fabien Guettard
- Area^{1}: 6.80 km^{2} (2.63 sq mi)
- Highest elevation: 212 m (696 ft)
- Lowest elevation: 113 m (371 ft)
- Population (2023): 180
  - Density: 26/km^{2} (69/sq mi)
- Time zone: UTC+01:00 (CET)
  - Summer (DST): UTC+02:00 (CEST)
- INSEE/Postal code: 89314 /89460
- ^{1} French Land Register data, which excludes lakes, ponds, glaciers > 1 km^{2} (0.386 sq mi or 247 acres) and river estuaries.

Prégilbert (French pronunciation: [pʁeʒilbɛʁ]) is a commune in the Yonne department in Bourgogne-Franche-Comté in north-central France.

== See also ==
- Communes of the Yonne department
