= Canton of Joux-la-Ville =

Canton of France

Coordinates: 47.62°N 3.86°E

The canton of Joux-la-Ville is an administrative division of the Yonne department, central France. It was created at the French canton reorganisation which came into effect in March 2015. Its seat is in Joux-la-Ville.

It consists of the following communes:

1. Arcy-sur-Cure
2. Asnières-sous-Bois
3. Asquins
4. Bazarnes
5. Bessy-sur-Cure
6. Blannay
7. Bois-d'Arcy
8. Brosses
9. Chamoux
10. Châtel-Censoir
11. Coulanges-sur-Yonne
12. Coutarnoux
13. Crain
14. Deux Rivières
15. Dissangis
16. Domecy-sur-Cure
17. Festigny
18. Foissy-lès-Vézelay
19. Fontenay-près-Vézelay
20. Fontenay-sous-Fouronnes
21. Givry
22. Joux-la-Ville
23. Lichères-sur-Yonne
24. Lucy-sur-Cure
25. Lucy-sur-Yonne
26. Mailly-la-Ville
27. Mailly-le-Château
28. Merry-sur-Yonne
29. Montillot
30. Pierre-Perthuis
31. Précy-le-Sec
32. Prégilbert
33. Sainte-Colombe
34. Sainte-Pallaye
35. Saint-Moré
36. Saint-Père
37. Sery
38. Tharoiseau
39. Trucy-sur-Yonne
40. Vermenton
41. Vézelay
42. Voutenay-sur-Cure
