= Coutarnoux =

- Commune
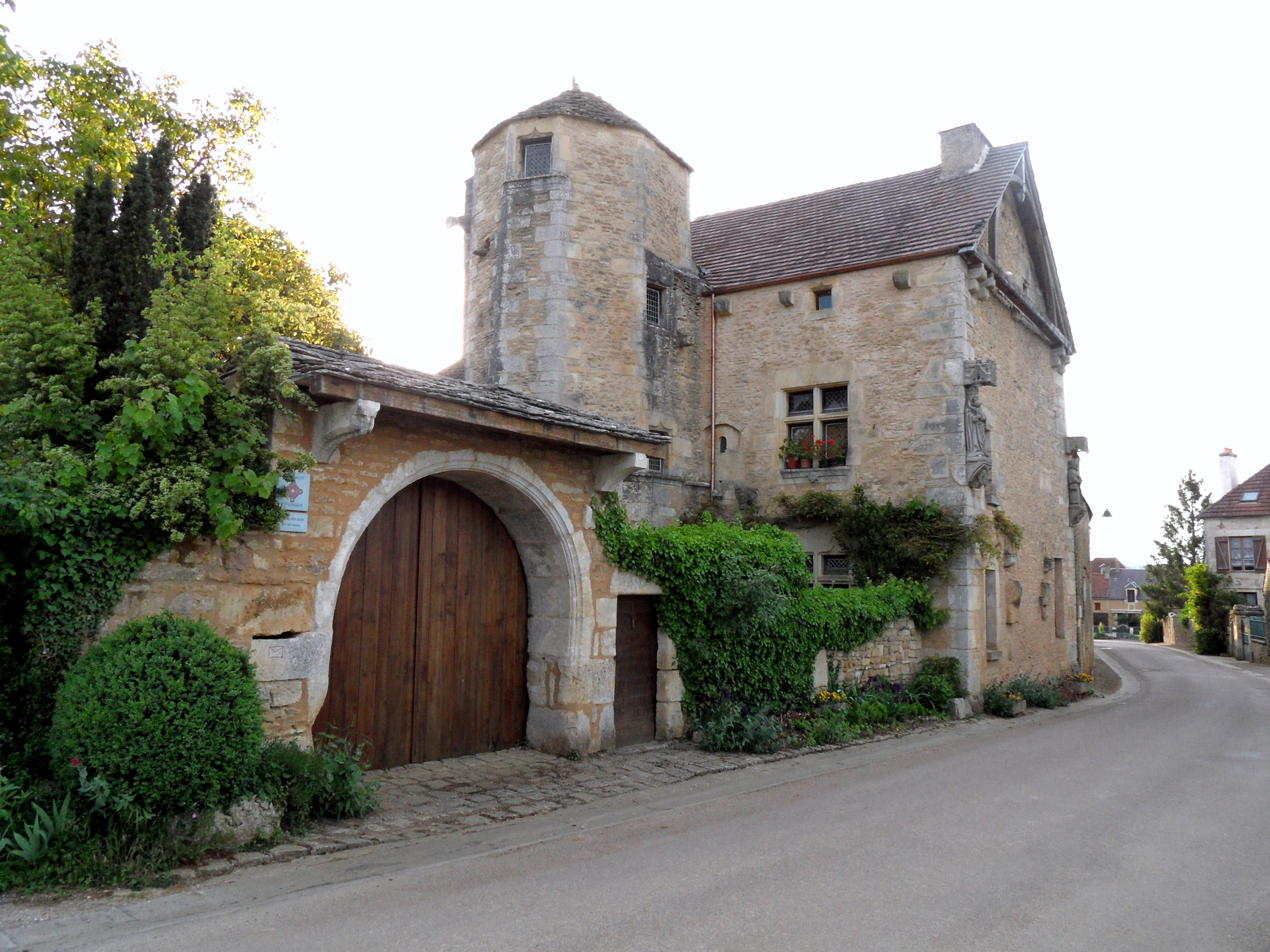
- The House of Goix in Coutarnoux

- Coat of arms
- Location of Coutarnoux
- Location within France Location within Bourgogne-Franche-Comté
- Coordinates: 47°35′15″N 3°57′56″E
- Country: France
- Region: Bourgogne-Franche-Comté
- Department: Yonne
- Arrondissement: Avallon
- Canton: Joux-la-Ville
- Area^{1}: 8.68 km^{2} (3.35 sq mi)
- Highest elevation: 332 m (1,089 ft)
- Lowest elevation: 214 m (702 ft)
- Population (2023): 124
  - Density: 14.3/km^{2} (37.0/sq mi)
- Time zone: UTC+01:00 (CET)
  - Summer (DST): UTC+02:00 (CEST)
- INSEE/Postal code: 89128 /89440
- ^{1} French Land Register data, which excludes lakes, ponds, glaciers > 1 km^{2} (0.386 sq mi or 247 acres) and river estuaries.

Coutarnoux (French pronunciation: [kutaʁnu]) is a commune in the Yonne department in Bourgogne-Franche-Comté in north-central France.

The oldest known form of its name is Curtis Arnulfi, "the enclosure belonging to a (Frankish or other German) man named Arnwulf" who invaded Gaul in the 4th to 6th centuries.

== See also ==
- Communes of the Yonne department
