= Merry-sur-Yonne =

- Commune
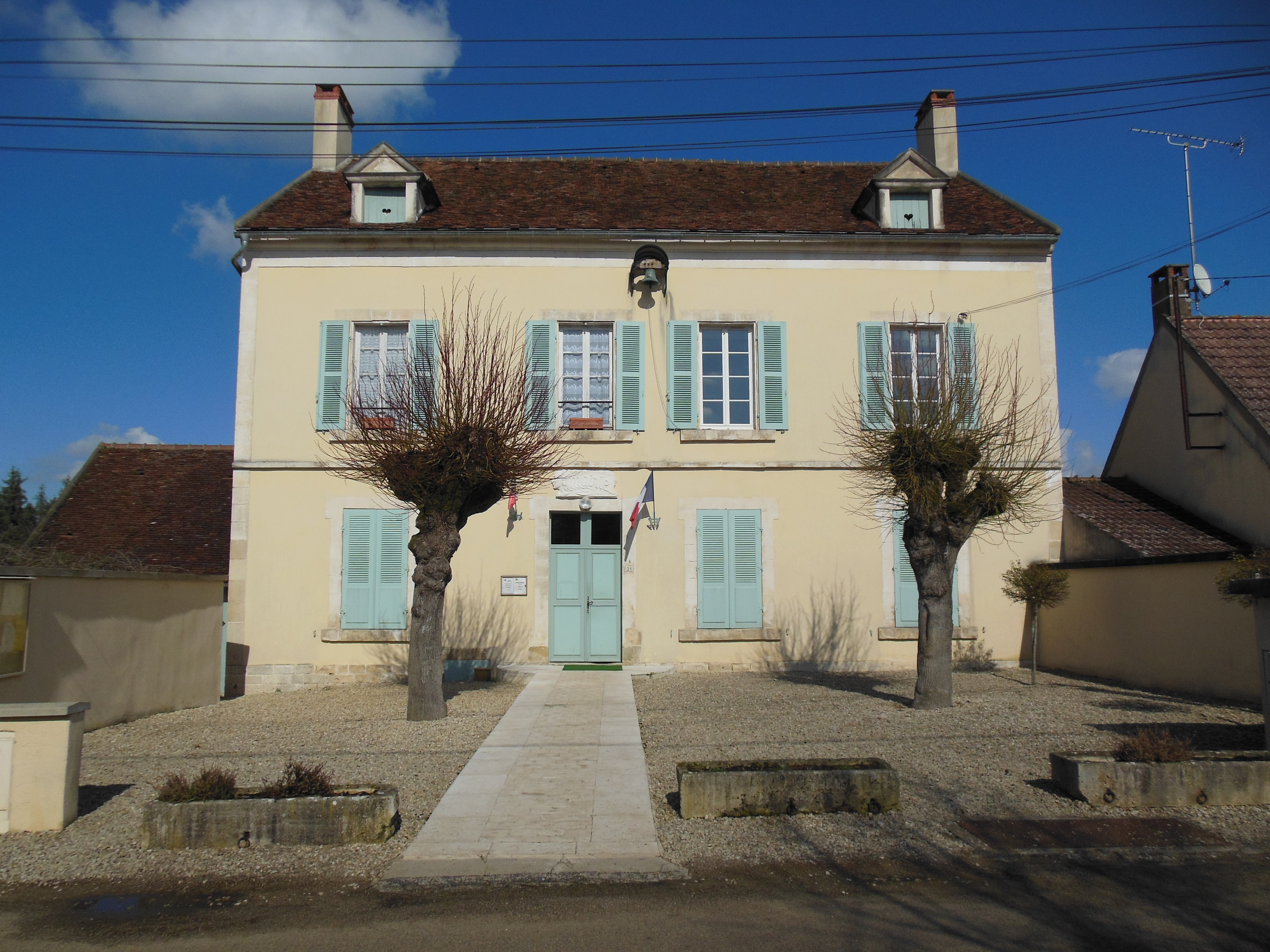
- The town hall in Merry-sur-Yonne

- Coat of arms
- Location of Merry-sur-Yonne
- Location within France Location within Bourgogne-Franche-Comté
- Coordinates: 47°33′50″N 3°38′41″E
- Country: France
- Region: Bourgogne-Franche-Comté
- Department: Yonne
- Arrondissement: Avallon
- Canton: Joux-la-Ville

Government
  - Mayor (2020–2026): Bruno Massias Jurien de La Gravière
- Area^{1}: 23.66 km^{2} (9.14 sq mi)
- Highest elevation: 241 m (791 ft)
- Lowest elevation: 122 m (400 ft)
- Population (2023): 187
  - Density: 7.90/km^{2} (20.5/sq mi)
- Time zone: UTC+01:00 (CET)
  - Summer (DST): UTC+02:00 (CEST)
- INSEE/Postal code: 89253 /89660
- ^{1} French Land Register data, which excludes lakes, ponds, glaciers > 1 km^{2} (0.386 sq mi or 247 acres) and river estuaries.

Merry-sur-Yonne (French pronunciation: [meʁi syʁjɔn], literally Merry on Yonne) is a commune in the Yonne Department, Bourgogne-Franche-Comté, north central France.

== Les Rochers du Saussois ==
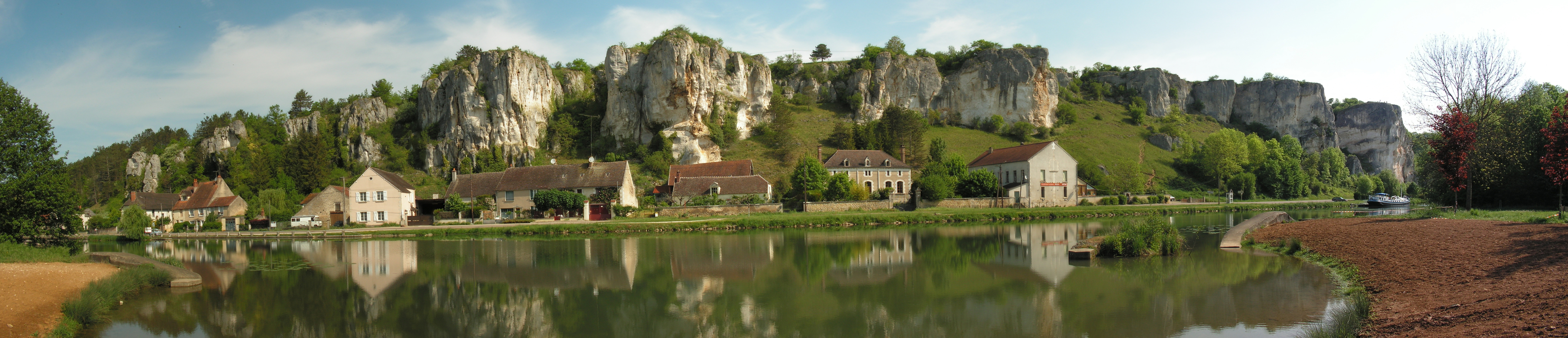

The Rochers du Saussois are a group of limestone cliffs situated on the right bank of the Yonne opposite and within the commune of Merry-sur-Yonne. They are a favourite location for rock-climbers.

== See also ==
- Communes of the Yonne department
