= Fontenay-près-Vézelay =

- Commune
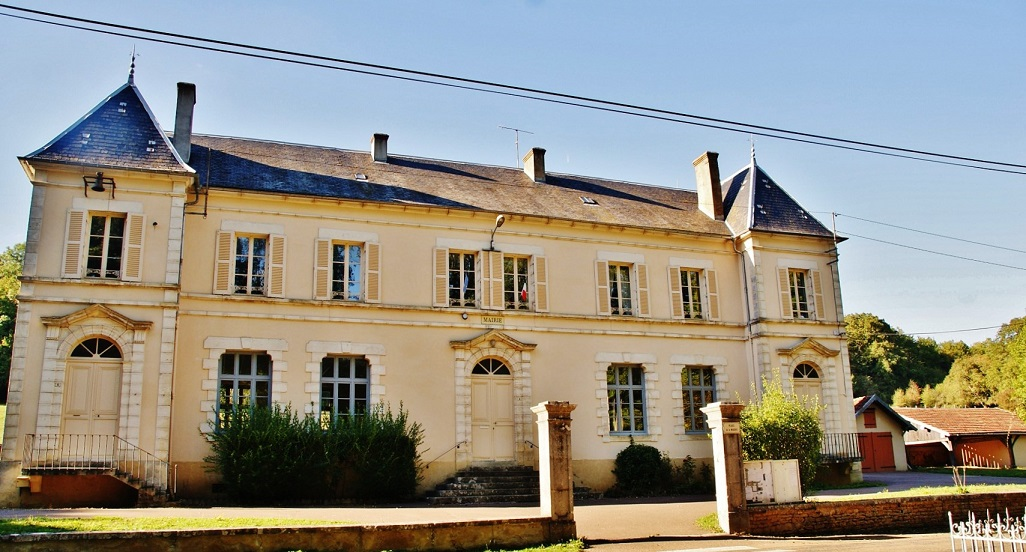
- The town hall in Fontenay-près-Vézelay
- Location of Fontenay-près-Vézelay
- Location within France Location within Bourgogne-Franche-Comté
- Coordinates: 47°25′09″N 3°45′39″E
- Country: France
- Region: Bourgogne-Franche-Comté
- Department: Yonne
- Arrondissement: Avallon
- Canton: Joux-la-Ville

Government
  - Mayor (2020–2026): Geneviève Danglard
- Area^{1}: 15.48 km^{2} (5.98 sq mi)
- Highest elevation: 345 m (1,132 ft)
- Lowest elevation: 167 m (548 ft)
- Population (2023): 135
  - Density: 8.72/km^{2} (22.6/sq mi)
- Time zone: UTC+01:00 (CET)
  - Summer (DST): UTC+02:00 (CEST)
- INSEE/Postal code: 89176 /89450
- ^{1} French Land Register data, which excludes lakes, ponds, glaciers > 1 km^{2} (0.386 sq mi or 247 acres) and river estuaries.

Fontenay-près-Vézelay (French pronunciation: [fɔ̃tnɛ pʁɛ vez(ə)lɛ], literally Fontenay near Vézelay) is a commune in the Yonne department in Bourgogne-Franche-Comté in north-central France.

== See also ==
- Communes of the Yonne department
- Parc naturel régional du Morvan
