= Mailly-la-Ville =

- Commune
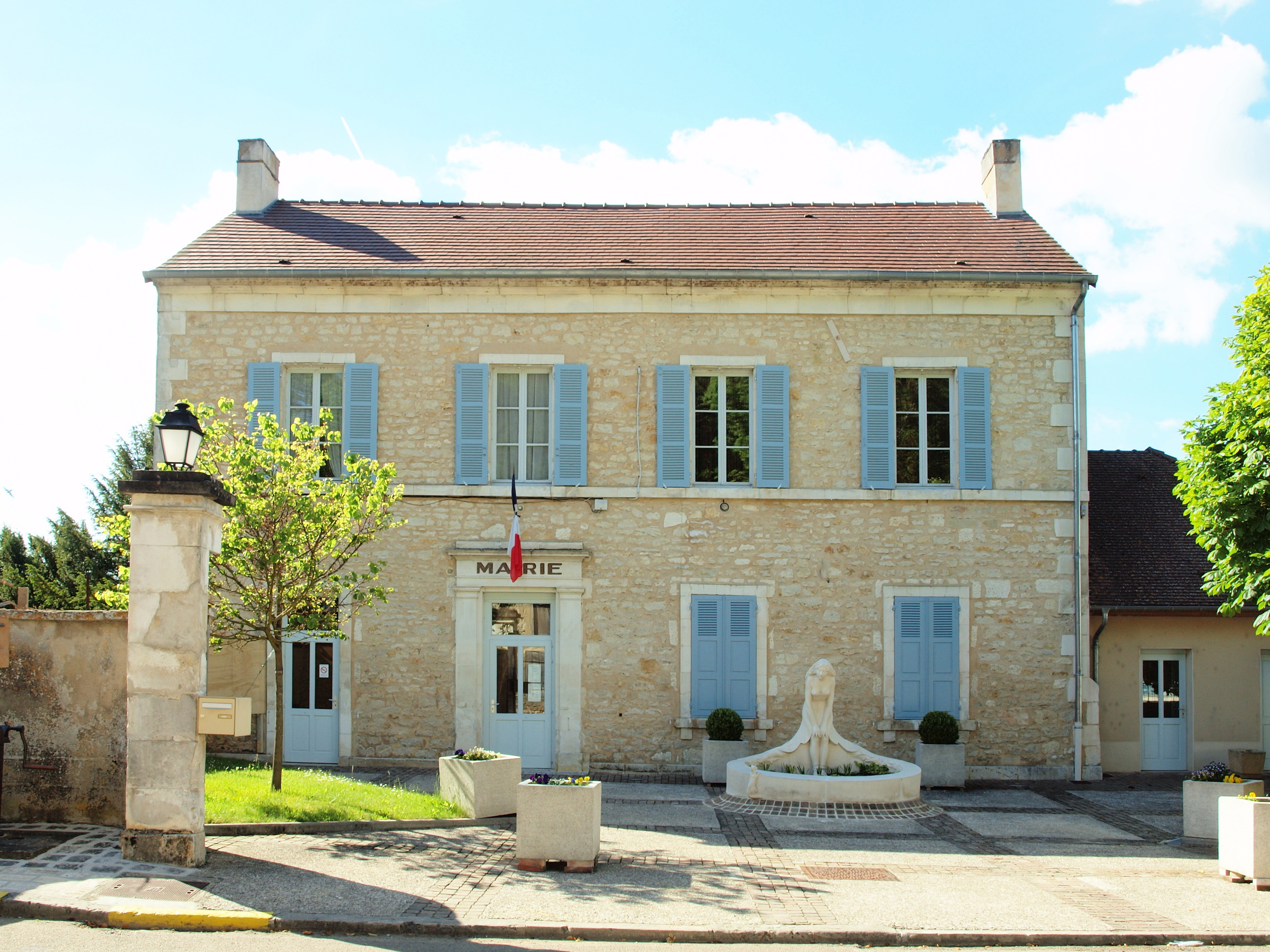
- The town hall in Mailly-la-Ville
- Location of Mailly-la-Ville
- Location within France Location within Bourgogne-Franche-Comté
- Coordinates: 47°36′00″N 3°40′55″E
- Country: France
- Region: Bourgogne-Franche-Comté
- Department: Yonne
- Arrondissement: Auxerre
- Canton: Joux-la-Ville

Government
  - Mayor (2020–2026): Jeannine Joublin
- Area^{1}: 23.79 km^{2} (9.19 sq mi)
- Highest elevation: 295 m (968 ft)
- Lowest elevation: 116 m (381 ft)
- Population (2023): 493
  - Density: 20.7/km^{2} (53.7/sq mi)
- Time zone: UTC+01:00 (CET)
  - Summer (DST): UTC+02:00 (CEST)
- INSEE/Postal code: 89237 /89270
- ^{1} French Land Register data, which excludes lakes, ponds, glaciers > 1 km^{2} (0.386 sq mi or 247 acres) and river estuaries.

Mailly-la-Ville (French pronunciation: [maji la vil]) is a commune in the Yonne department in Bourgogne-Franche-Comté in north-central France.

== See also ==
- Communes of the Yonne department
