= Lichères-sur-Yonne =

- Commune
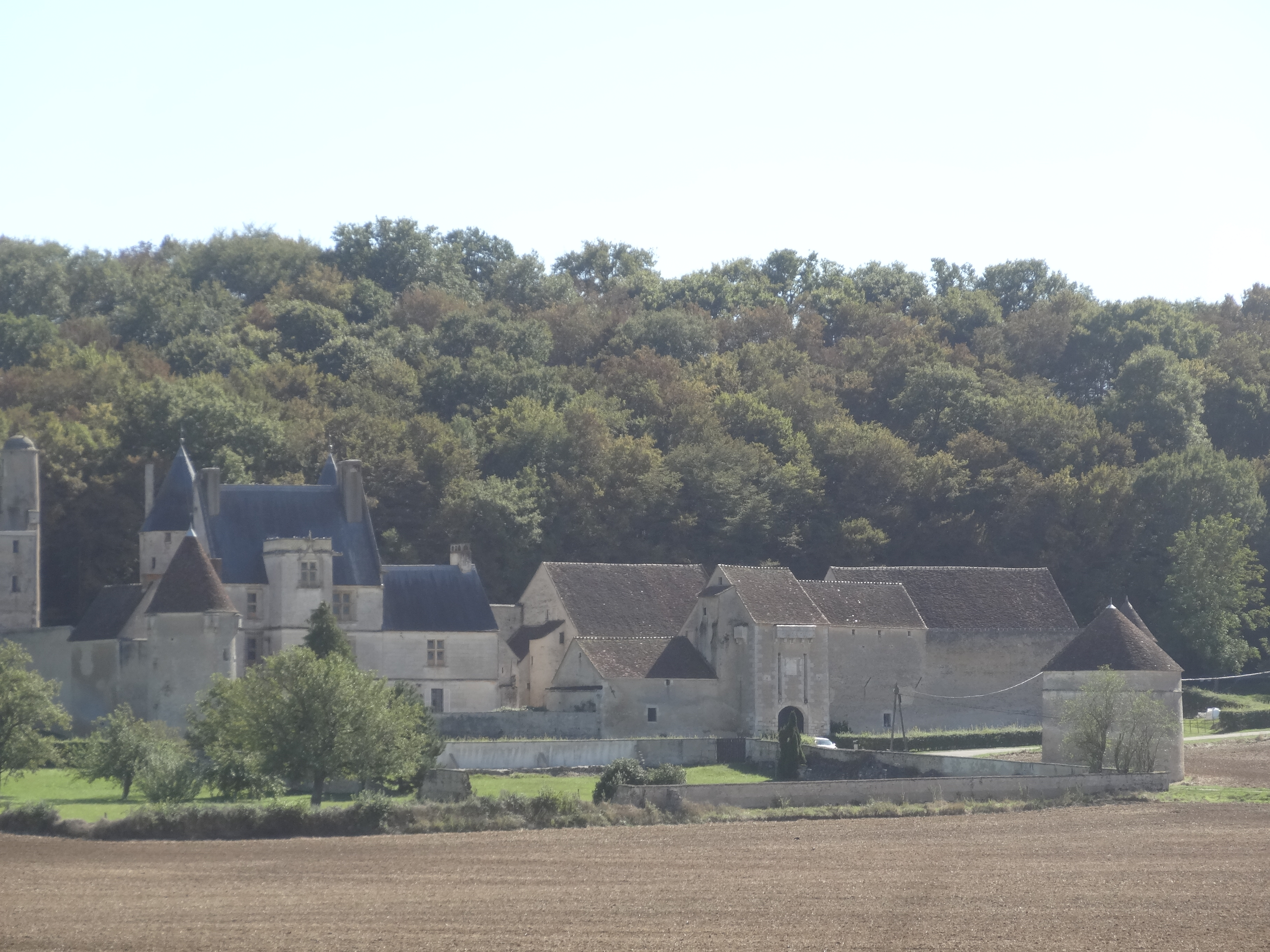
- Faulin Castle in Lichères-sur-Yonne
- Location of Lichères-sur-Yonne
- Location within France Location within Bourgogne-Franche-Comté
- Coordinates: 47°30′30″N 3°35′33″E
- Country: France
- Region: Bourgogne-Franche-Comté
- Department: Yonne
- Arrondissement: Avallon
- Canton: Joux-la-Ville

Government
  - Mayor (2020–2026): Christophe Darenne
- Area^{1}: 14.31 km^{2} (5.53 sq mi)
- Highest elevation: 259 m (850 ft)
- Lowest elevation: 132 m (433 ft)
- Population (2023): 49
  - Density: 3.4/km^{2} (8.9/sq mi)
- Time zone: UTC+01:00 (CET)
  - Summer (DST): UTC+02:00 (CEST)
- INSEE/Postal code: 89225 /89660
- ^{1} French Land Register data, which excludes lakes, ponds, glaciers > 1 km^{2} (0.386 sq mi or 247 acres) and river estuaries.

Lichères-sur-Yonne (French pronunciation: [liʃɛʁ syʁ jɔn]) is a commune in the Yonne department in Bourgogne-Franche-Comté in north-central France.

== See also ==
- Communes of the Yonne department
