= Sainte-Colombe, Yonne =

Sainte-Colombe
- Commune
- Coat of arms
- Location of Sainte-Colombe
- Location within France Location within Bourgogne-Franche-Comté
- Coordinates: 47°34′02″N 3°58′12″E
- Country: France
- Region: Bourgogne-Franche-Comté
- Department: Yonne
- Arrondissement: Avallon
- Canton: Joux-la-Ville

Government
  - Mayor (2020–2026): Claude Catrin
- Area^{1}: 18.48 km^{2} (7.14 sq mi)
- Highest elevation: 361 m (1,184 ft)
- Lowest elevation: 199 m (653 ft)
- Population (2023): 184
  - Density: 9.96/km^{2} (25.8/sq mi)
- Time zone: UTC+01:00 (CET)
  - Summer (DST): UTC+02:00 (CEST)
- INSEE/Postal code: 89339 /89440
- ^{1} French Land Register data, which excludes lakes, ponds, glaciers > 1 km^{2} (0.386 sq mi or 247 acres) and river estuaries.

Sainte-Colombe (French pronunciation: [sɛ̃t kɔlɔ̃b]) is a commune in the Yonne department in Bourgogne-Franche-Comté in north-central France.

== See also ==
- Communes of the Yonne department
