= Sainte-Pallaye =

- Commune
- Coat of arms
- Location of Sainte-Pallaye
- Location within France Location within Bourgogne-Franche-Comté
- Coordinates: 47°39′00″N 3°40′16″E
- Country: France
- Region: Bourgogne-Franche-Comté
- Department: Yonne
- Arrondissement: Auxerre
- Canton: Joux-la-Ville

Government
  - Mayor (2020–2026): Marc Valero
- Area^{1}: 4.07 km^{2} (1.57 sq mi)
- Highest elevation: 211 m (692 ft)
- Lowest elevation: 110 m (360 ft)
- Population (2023): 97
  - Density: 24/km^{2} (62/sq mi)
- Time zone: UTC+01:00 (CET)
  - Summer (DST): UTC+02:00 (CEST)
- INSEE/Postal code: 89363 /89460
- ^{1} French Land Register data, which excludes lakes, ponds, glaciers > 1 km^{2} (0.386 sq mi or 247 acres) and river estuaries.

Sainte-Pallaye (French pronunciation: [sɛ̃t palɛ]) is a commune in the Yonne department in Bourgogne-Franche-Comté in north-central France.

== See also ==
- Communes of the Yonne department
