= Festigny, Yonne =

Festigny
- Commune
- Location of Festigny
- Location within France Location within Bourgogne-Franche-Comté
- Coordinates: 47°33′18″N 3°32′18″E
- Country: France
- Region: Bourgogne-Franche-Comté
- Department: Yonne
- Arrondissement: Auxerre
- Canton: Joux-la-Ville

Government
  - Mayor (2020–2026): Michèle Donzel-Bourjade
- Area^{1}: 5.56 km^{2} (2.15 sq mi)
- Highest elevation: 223 m (732 ft)
- Lowest elevation: 157 m (515 ft)
- Population (2023): 92
  - Density: 17/km^{2} (43/sq mi)
- Time zone: UTC+01:00 (CET)
  - Summer (DST): UTC+02:00 (CEST)
- INSEE/Postal code: 89164 /89480
- ^{1} French Land Register data, which excludes lakes, ponds, glaciers > 1 km^{2} (0.386 sq mi or 247 acres) and river estuaries.

Festigny (French pronunciation: [fɛstiɲi]) is a commune in the Yonne department in Bourgogne-Franche-Comté in north-central France.

== See also ==
- Communes of the Yonne department
