= Fouronnes =

- Commune
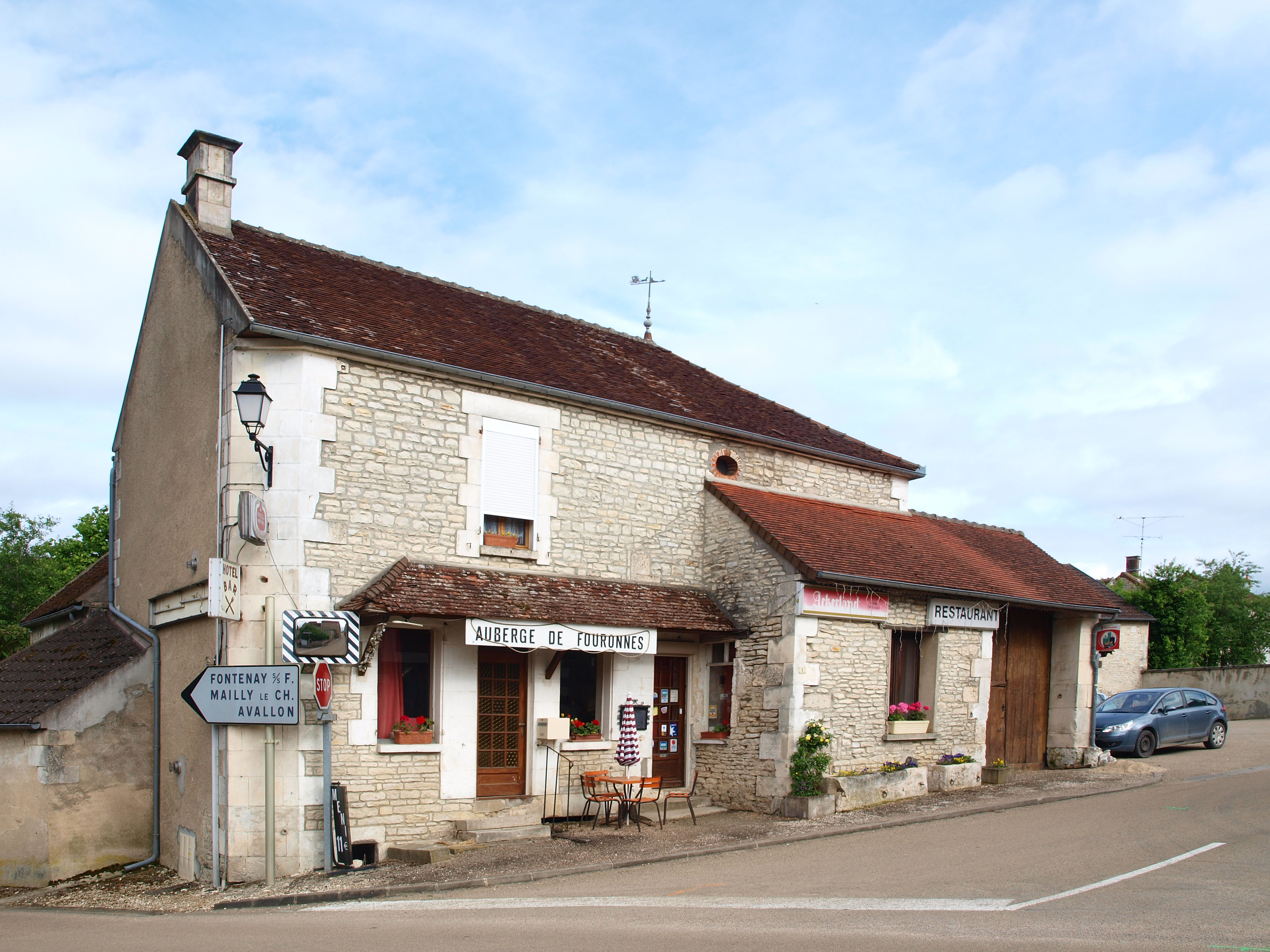
- Auberge de Fouronnes
- Location of Fouronnes
- Location within France Location within Bourgogne-Franche-Comté
- Coordinates: 47°36′48″N 3°34′02″E
- Country: France
- Region: Bourgogne-Franche-Comté
- Department: Yonne
- Arrondissement: Auxerre
- Canton: Vincelles

Government
  - Mayor (2020–2026): Luc Jacquet
- Area^{1}: 17.79 km^{2} (6.87 sq mi)
- Highest elevation: 343 m (1,125 ft)
- Lowest elevation: 183 m (600 ft)
- Population (2023): 183
  - Density: 10.3/km^{2} (26.6/sq mi)
- Time zone: UTC+01:00 (CET)
  - Summer (DST): UTC+02:00 (CEST)
- INSEE/Postal code: 89182 /89560
- ^{1} French Land Register data, which excludes lakes, ponds, glaciers > 1 km^{2} (0.386 sq mi or 247 acres) and river estuaries.

Fouronnes (French pronunciation: [fuʁɔn]) is a commune in the Yonne department in Bourgogne-Franche-Comté in north-central France, in the natural region of Forterre.

== See also ==
- Communes of the Yonne department
