= Sery, Yonne =

Sery
- Commune
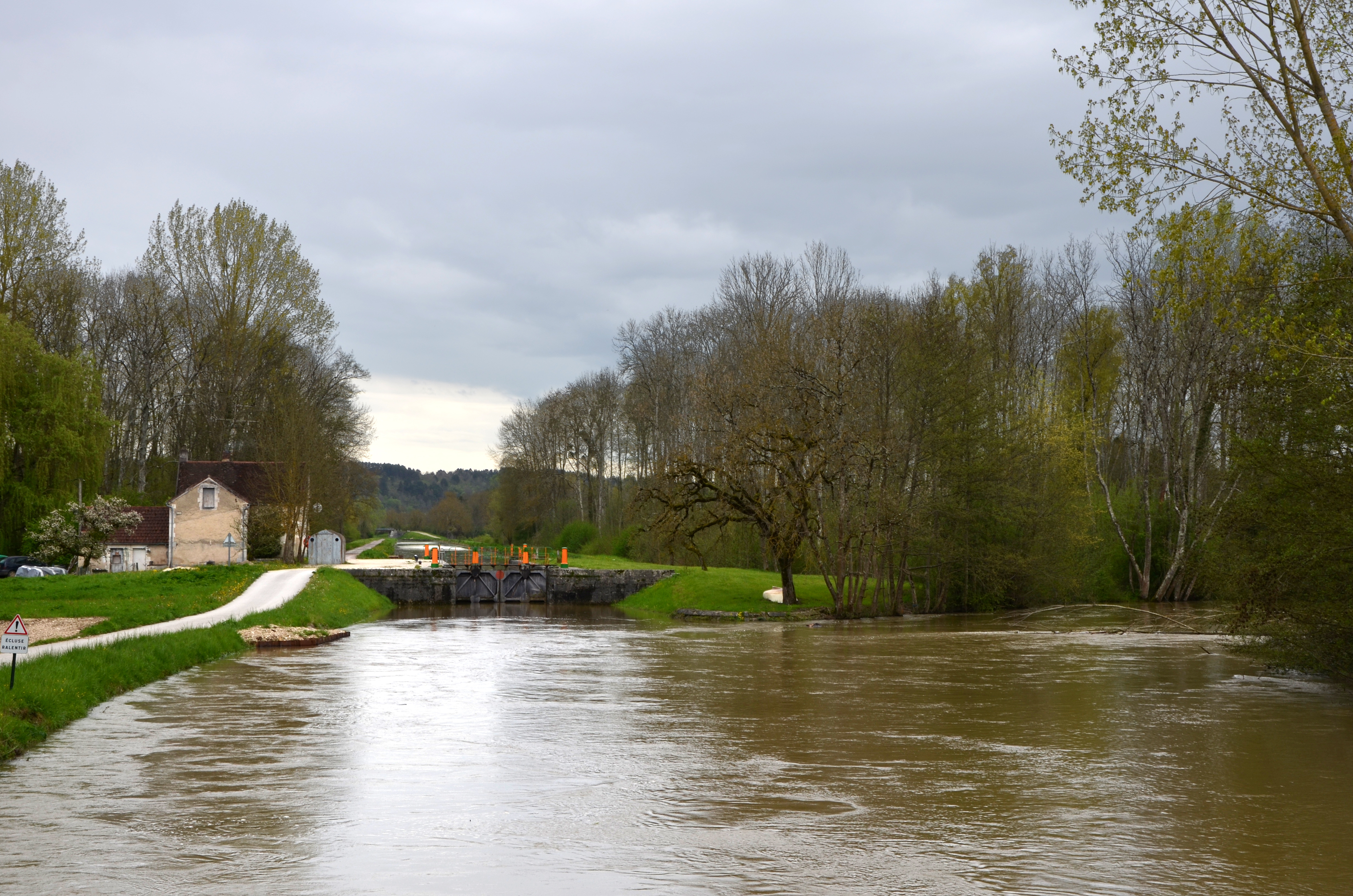
- The canal and Yonne river in Sery
- Location of Sery
- Location within France Location within Bourgogne-Franche-Comté
- Coordinates: 47°37′09″N 3°41′05″E
- Country: France
- Region: Bourgogne-Franche-Comté
- Department: Yonne
- Arrondissement: Auxerre
- Canton: Joux-la-Ville

Government
  - Mayor (2020–2026): Sylvie Chalmeau
- Area^{1}: 4.26 km^{2} (1.64 sq mi)
- Highest elevation: 218 m (715 ft)
- Lowest elevation: 117 m (384 ft)
- Population (2023): 79
  - Density: 19/km^{2} (48/sq mi)
- Time zone: UTC+01:00 (CET)
  - Summer (DST): UTC+02:00 (CEST)
- INSEE/Postal code: 89394 /89270
- ^{1} French Land Register data, which excludes lakes, ponds, glaciers > 1 km^{2} (0.386 sq mi or 247 acres) and river estuaries.

Sery (French pronunciation: [səʁi]) is a commune in the Yonne department in Bourgogne-Franche-Comté in north-central France.

== See also ==
- Communes of the Yonne department
