= Cantons of the Yonne department =

The following is a list of the 21 cantons of the Yonne department, in France, following the French canton reorganisation which came into effect in March 2015:

- Auxerre-1
- Auxerre-2
- Auxerre-3
- Auxerre-4
- Avallon
- Brienon-sur-Armançon
- Chablis
- Charny Orée de Puisaye
- Cœur de Puisaye
- Gâtinais en Bourgogne
- Joigny
- Joux-la-Ville
- Migennes
- Pont-sur-Yonne
- Saint-Florentin
- Sens-1
- Sens-2
- Thorigny-sur-Oreuse
- Tonnerrois
- Villeneuve-sur-Yonne
- Vincelles
