= Saint-Bris AOC =

White wine

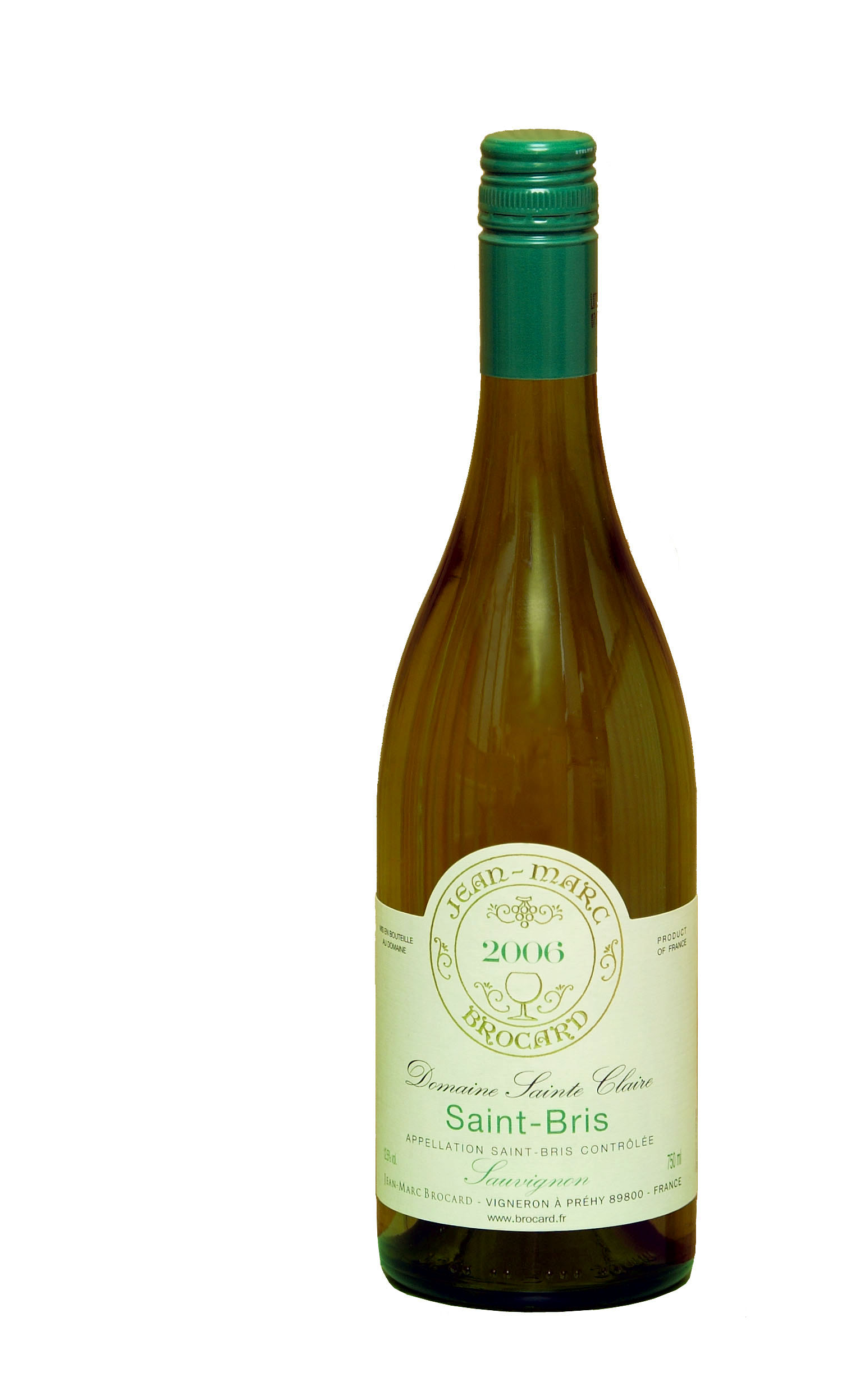
A bottle of Domaine Sainte Claire Saint-Bris Sauvignon 2006 from Jean-Marc Brocard.

Saint-Bris is an Appellation d'origine contrôlée (AOC) for white wine in the Burgundy wine region of France. This AOC is located around the village Saint-Bris-le-Vineux in the Yonne department, a few kilometers southwest of the Chablis AOC area, and southeast of the city of Auxerre, which places it roughly halfway between Paris and Burgundy's heartland in Côte d'Or. The approximately 100 hectares (250 acres) of vineyard in the appellation are situated in the communes Chitry, Irancy, Quenne, Saint-Bris-le-Vineux and Vincelottes.

What makes Saint-Bris something of an oddity for Burgundy is that it is made from Sauvignon grapes, with the varieties Sauvignon blanc and Sauvignon gris both being allowed, rather than the Chardonnay of Chablis and the notable white Burgundies, or the Aligoté of many simpler, easy-drinking whites of the region. It is the only Burgundy AOC that allows Sauvignon in the wines. Wines from vineyards around Saint-Bris-le-Vineux planted with Chardonnay or Pinot noir are not included in the Saint-Bris AOC, but are allowed the appellation Côtes d'Auxerre.

While showing typical Sauvignon aromas, the wines have been characterised as less concentrated than the Sauvignon blanc-based AOC wines of the upper Loire valley, notably Sancerre and Pouilly-Fumé.

== History ==
Until the late 19th century, there were large vineyards in the Yonne department, covering 40,000 hectares (99,000 acres), with nearby Paris as their main market, with which they were linked by waterways. One of the grape varieties grown in the Saint-Bris area was Roublot, which is now all but extinct. In those days, before the creation of the more strict appellation rules, wines from the Saint-Bris area could be called Chablis. The combination of competition from the Le Midi - the south of France - after the introduction of railroads in the 19th century, and the Great French Wine Blight phylloxera epidemic, in the late 19th and early 20th century knocked out almost the entire Yonne wine business, and most vineyards were abandoned.

It seems that Sauvignon grapes were introduced to the Saint-Bris area sometime after the local wine industry had more or less collapsed, perhaps due to the variety's success on the upper River Loire, not far away, and because Roublot had shown itself susceptible to disease and therefore was less suitable for replanting. In 1974, the Sauvignon-based white wines of Saint-Bris were considered good enough to be awarded VDQS status under the name of Sauvignon de Saint-Bris. In January 2003 they were elevated to full AOC status under the present name of Saint-Bris, and wines starting with the 2001 vintage were allowed to use the AOC name. The VDQS designation was repealed at the same time.
