= Saint-Bris =

Saint-Bris can refer to

- Saint-Bris-des-Bois, a village and commune in the Charente-Maritime department in France
- Saint-Bris-le-Vineux, a village and commune in the Yonne department in France
- Saint-Bris AOC, a white wine produced around Saint-Bris-le-Vineux

== See also ==
- Gonzague Saint Bris (1948–2017), French author
