= Villeneuve-Saint-Salves =

- Commune
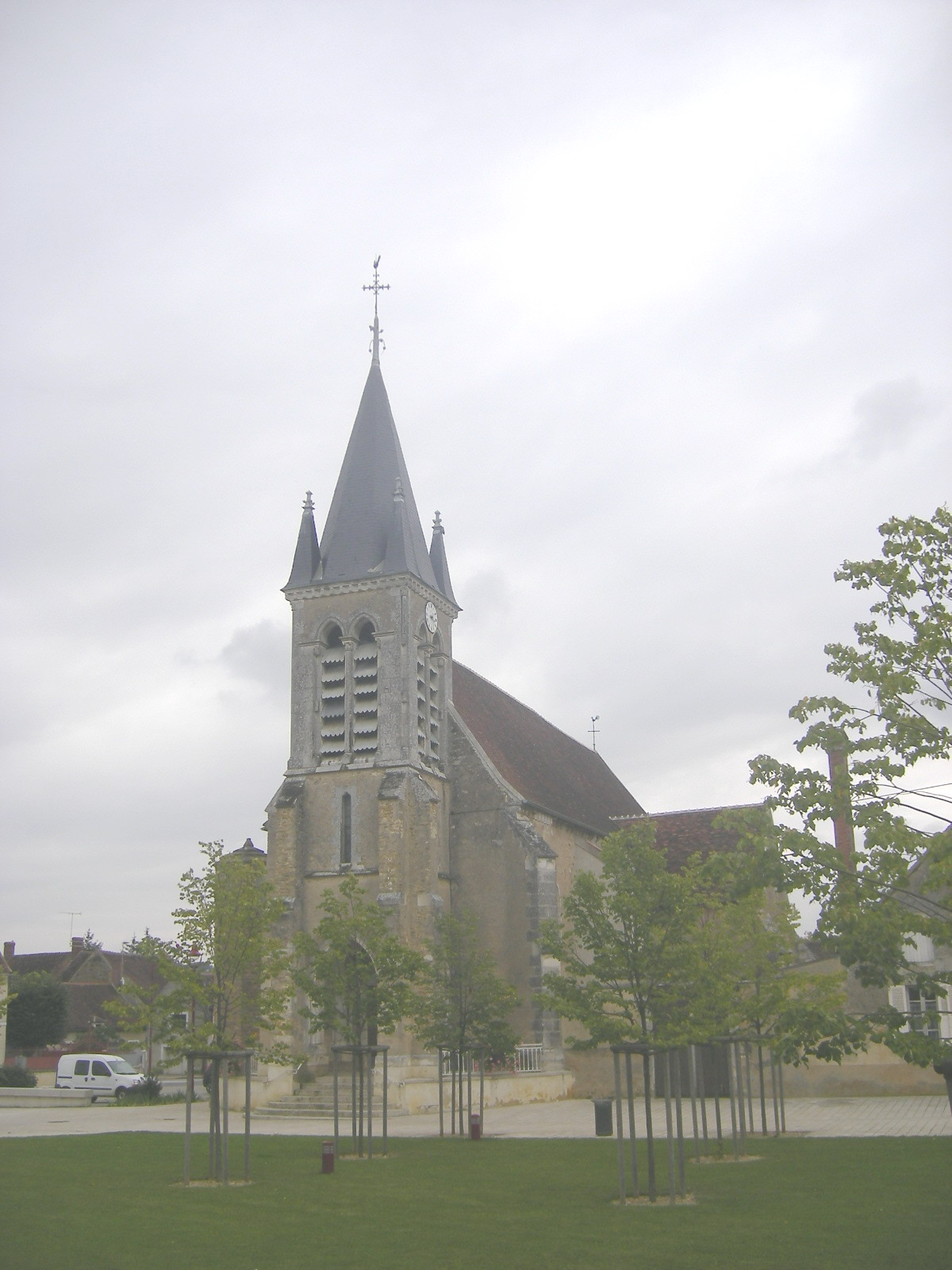
- The church in Villeneuve-Saint-Salves

- Coat of arms
- Location of Villeneuve-Saint-Salves
- Location within France Location within Bourgogne-Franche-Comté
- Coordinates: 47°51′20″N 3°39′06″E
- Country: France
- Region: Bourgogne-Franche-Comté
- Department: Yonne
- Arrondissement: Auxerre
- Canton: Chablis
- Intercommunality: CA Auxerrois

Government
  - Mayor (2020–2026): Lionel Mion
- Area^{1}: 7.04 km^{2} (2.72 sq mi)
- Highest elevation: 260 m (850 ft)
- Lowest elevation: 123 m (404 ft)
- Population (2023): 256
  - Density: 36.4/km^{2} (94.2/sq mi)
- Time zone: UTC+01:00 (CET)
  - Summer (DST): UTC+02:00 (CEST)
- INSEE/Postal code: 89463 /89230
- ^{1} French Land Register data, which excludes lakes, ponds, glaciers > 1 km^{2} (0.386 sq mi or 247 acres) and river estuaries.

Villeneuve-Saint-Salves (French pronunciation: [vilnœv sɛ̃ salv]) is a commune in the Yonne department in Bourgogne-Franche-Comté in north-central France.

== See also ==
- Communes of the Yonne department
