= Villefargeau =

- Commune
- Coat of arms
- Location of Villefargeau
- Location within France Location within Bourgogne-Franche-Comté
- Coordinates: 47°47′00″N 3°30′18″E
- Country: France
- Region: Bourgogne-Franche-Comté
- Department: Yonne
- Arrondissement: Auxerre
- Canton: Auxerre-1
- Intercommunality: CA Auxerrois

Government
  - Mayor (2020–2026): Pascal Barberet
- Area^{1}: 13.77 km^{2} (5.32 sq mi)
- Highest elevation: 211 m (692 ft)
- Lowest elevation: 118 m (387 ft)
- Population (2023): 1,098
  - Density: 79.74/km^{2} (206.5/sq mi)
- Time zone: UTC+01:00 (CET)
  - Summer (DST): UTC+02:00 (CEST)
- INSEE/Postal code: 89453 /89240
- ^{1} French Land Register data, which excludes lakes, ponds, glaciers > 1 km^{2} (0.386 sq mi or 247 acres) and river estuaries.

Villefargeau (French pronunciation: [vilfaʁʒo]) is a commune in the Yonne department in Bourgogne-Franche-Comté in north-central France.

== See also ==
- Communes of the Yonne department
