= Charbuy =

- Commune
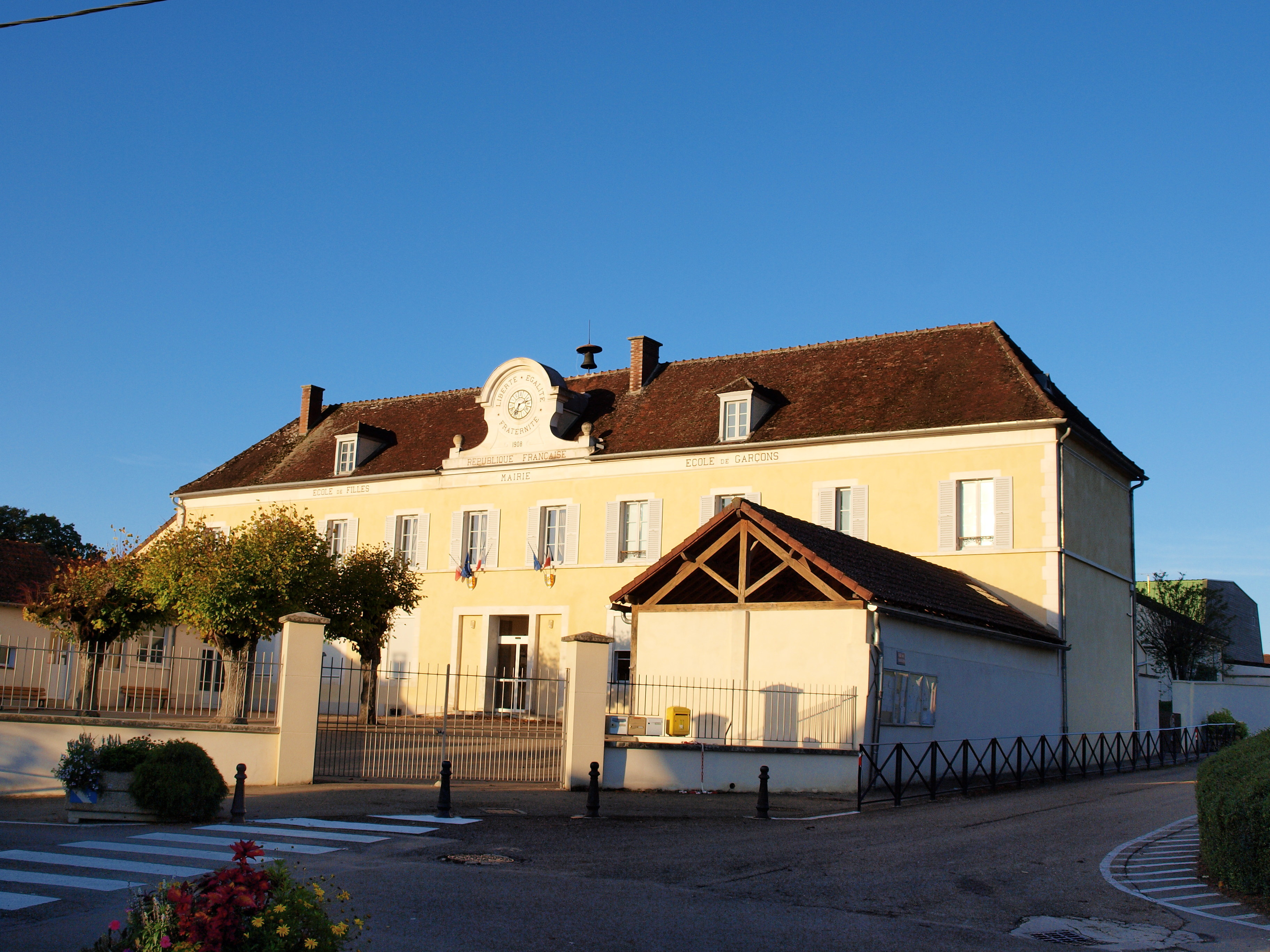
- The town hall in Charbuy

- Coat of arms
- Location of Charbuy
- Location within France Location within Bourgogne-Franche-Comté
- Coordinates: 47°49′29″N 3°28′02″E
- Country: France
- Region: Bourgogne-Franche-Comté
- Department: Yonne
- Arrondissement: Auxerre
- Canton: Auxerre-2
- Intercommunality: CA Auxerrois

Government
  - Mayor (2020–2026): Gérard Delille
- Area^{1}: 23.40 km^{2} (9.03 sq mi)
- Highest elevation: 212 m (696 ft)
- Lowest elevation: 115 m (377 ft)
- Population (2023): 1,868
  - Density: 79.83/km^{2} (206.8/sq mi)
- Time zone: UTC+01:00 (CET)
  - Summer (DST): UTC+02:00 (CEST)
- INSEE/Postal code: 89083 /89113
- ^{1} French Land Register data, which excludes lakes, ponds, glaciers > 1 km^{2} (0.386 sq mi or 247 acres) and river estuaries.

Charbuy (French pronunciation: [ʃaʁbɥi]) is a commune in the Yonne department in Bourgogne-Franche-Comté in north-central France.

== See also ==
- Communes of the Yonne department
