= Jean-Félicissime Adry =

French bibliographer

Jean-Félicissime Adry (1749, Vincelottes, Yonne – 20 March 1818, Paris) was a 19th-century French bibliographer.

== Biography ==
A member of the Oratory of Saint Philip Neri, he taught rhetoric at the Troyes college. He befriended Pierre-Jean Grosley, for who he transcribed documents on the history of Troyes. He then became librarian of the house of the Oratory in Paris. Driven from this job at the French Revolution, he retired to his study, among his books, receiving visits only of his former students and men of letters.

His contributions to the Magasin encyclopédique by Aubin-Louis Millin de Grandmaison drew attention on him and he was appointed a member of the commission examining the books and obtained a pension. In addition to several editions of ancients and modern works, among which those by Quintilius, Cicero, Boccaccio, Madame de La Fayette, Fénelon, La Fontaine, François Raguenet, Marie de Hautefort and François Charpentier, he especially wrote a Dictionnaire des jeux de l'enfance et de la jeunesse chez tous les peuples.

== Main works ==
- 1800: Histoire de la vie et de la mort tragique de Vittoria Accoramboni, duchesse de Bracciano
- 1801: Essai sur la bibliographie et sur les talens du bibliothécaire
- 1806: Notice sur les imprimeurs de la famille des Elzévirs, faisant partie de l'introduction au catalogue raisonné de toutes les éditions qu'ils ont données
- 1807: Notice sur le collège de Juilly
- 1864: Dictionnaire des jeux de l'enfance et de la jeunesse chez tous les peuples. Réédition : Tchou, Paris. Text online
- 1855–1866: Catalogue des ouvrages que l'on doit lire pour étudier la religion et éclairer les difficultés de la Bible et de la théologie contenu dans : Jacques Paul Migne, Troisième et dernière encyclopédie théologique ou troisième et dernière série de dictionnaires sur toutes les parties de la science religieuse (60 volumes)

== Sources ==
- Jean-Félicissime Adry in Louis Gabriel Michaud's Biographie universelle ancienne et moderne: histoire par ordre alphabétique de la vie publique et privée de tous les hommes avec la collaboration de plus de 300 savants et littérateurs français ou étrangers, 2e édition, 1843-1865
