= Gurgy =

- Commune
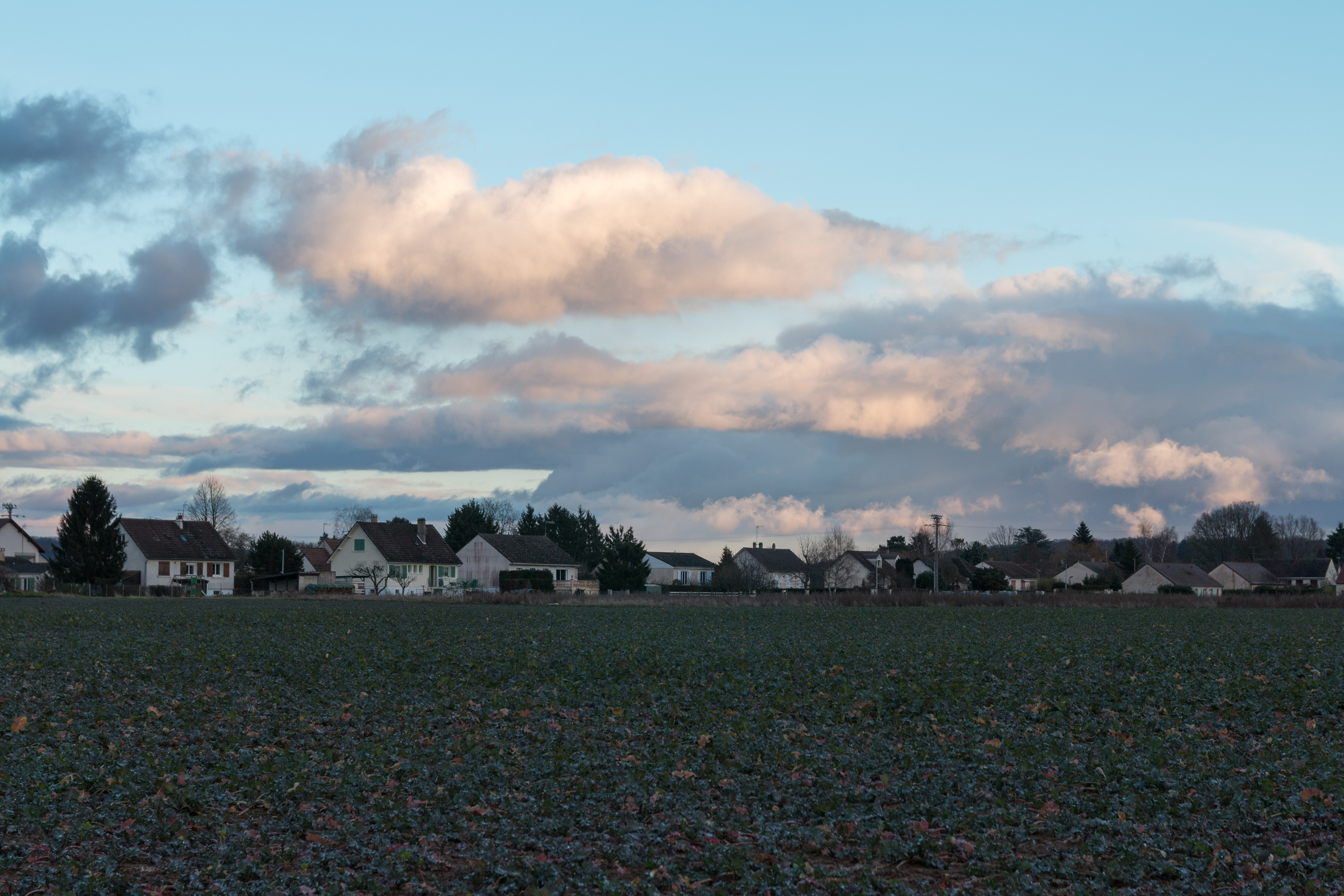
- A general view of Gurgy
- Location of Gurgy
- Location within France Location within Bourgogne-Franche-Comté
- Coordinates: 47°52′01″N 3°33′40″E
- Country: France
- Region: Bourgogne-Franche-Comté
- Department: Yonne
- Arrondissement: Auxerre
- Canton: Auxerre-2
- Intercommunality: CA Auxerrois

Government
  - Mayor (2024–2026): Cyril Chauvot
- Area^{1}: 13.12 km^{2} (5.07 sq mi)
- Highest elevation: 144 m (472 ft)
- Lowest elevation: 82 m (269 ft)
- Population (2023): 1,723
  - Density: 131.3/km^{2} (340.1/sq mi)
- Time zone: UTC+01:00 (CET)
  - Summer (DST): UTC+02:00 (CEST)
- INSEE/Postal code: 89198 /89250
- ^{1} French Land Register data, which excludes lakes, ponds, glaciers > 1 km^{2} (0.386 sq mi or 247 acres) and river estuaries.

Gurgy (French pronunciation: [ɡyʁʒi]) is a commune in the Yonne department in Bourgogne-Franche-Comté in north-central France.

== See also ==
- Communes of the Yonne department
