= Escamps =

Escamps may refer to:

- Escamps, Lot, a commune in the French region of Midi-Pyrénées
- Escamps, Yonne, a commune in the French region of Bourgogne
