= Guillaume-Charles Faipoult =

French aristocrat, soldier and politician

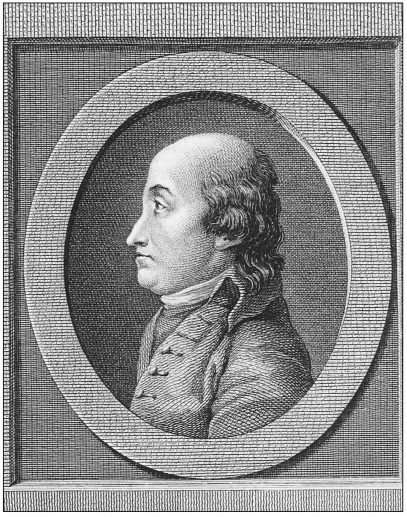
- Portrait by Launay after a drawing by Anne Germain
- Born: Guillaume-Charles Faipoult de Maisoncelle; 4 December 1752; Paris, France
- Died: 8 October 1817 (aged 64); Augy, Yonne, France
- Occupations: Soldier, politician
- Known for: Minister of Finance

Guillaume-Charles Faipoult (Formally Guillaume-Charles, chevalier Faipoult de Maisoncelle; 4 December 1752 – 8 October 1817) was a French aristocrat, soldier and politician who was Minister of Finance during the French Revolution. He then represented France in Italy, where he organized the newly formed republics. During the First French Empire he was prefect of the Scheldt department, and then Minister of Finance in Spain under Joseph Bonaparte. Faipoult was prefect of Saône-et-Loire during the Hundred Days.

== Early years ==
Guillaume-Charles Faipoult de Maisoncelle, was born in Paris on 4 December 1752, son of a noble family of Champagne. His parents were Charles Faipoult de Maisoncelles, lord of Fays and of Trois-Fontaines-la-Ville, Marne (died 1761), and Marie Aubert (died 1754). He studied at the Royal School of Engineers at Charleville-Mézières, where Lazare Carnot was his fellow pupil, and graduated as a lieutenant of the engineers. He was promoted to captain, but resigned in 1780 after having been refused permission to fight for the independence of the English colonies in America. He then devoted himself to the study of the sciences.

== French Revolution ==
Faipoult was a partisan of the French Revolution, and a member of the Jacobins society. In 1792 he was appointed secretary-general of the Ministry of the Interior under Jean-Marie Roland. The next year he was forced out of office by a decree of the National Convention that banished all former nobles from Paris. He was not able to return until after the Thermidorian Reaction of 9 Thermidor II (27 July 1794). On 10 Vendémiaire III (1 October 1794) Faipoult was named Minister of Finance, and held this position until 24 Pluviôse IV (13 February 1796). It was under his administration that the pledges of assignats were broken.

== Italy ==
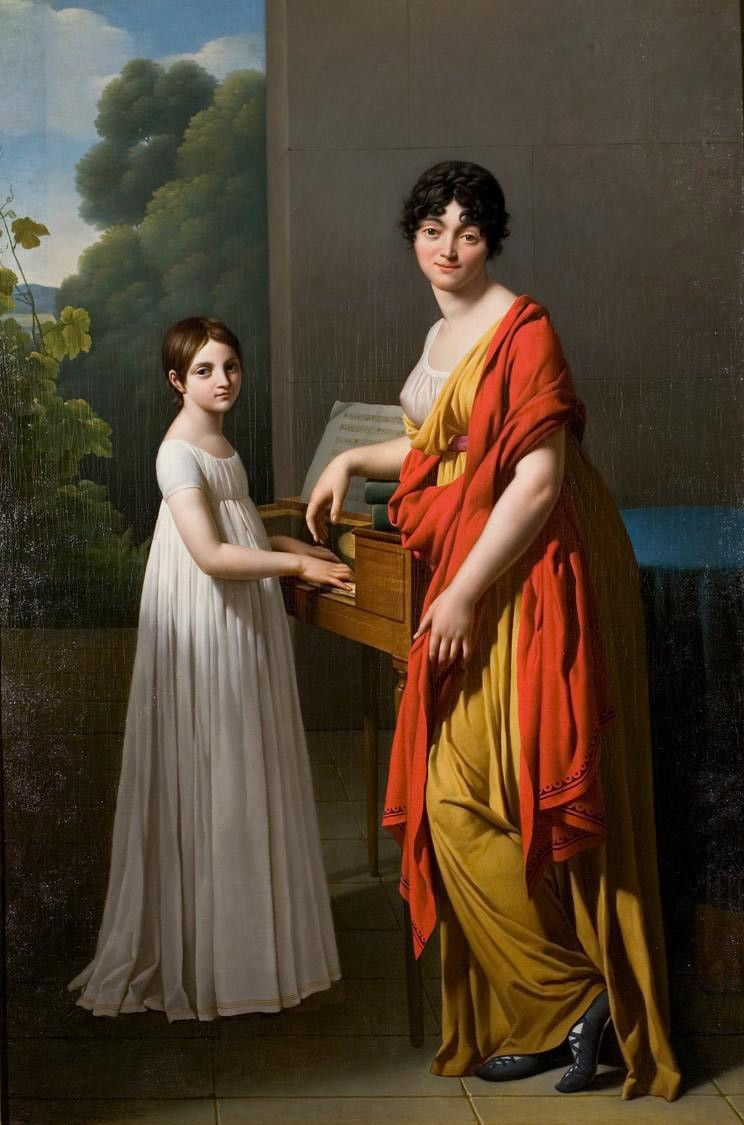
Germaine Faipoult de Maisoncelle and her daughter Julie by Serangeli circa 1799 by Gioacchino Giuseppe Serangeli

Faipoult was then sent as minister plenipotentiary to the Republic of Genoa, where he destroyed the influence of the agents of Austria and England and gained the confidence of Bonaparte. He was minister plenipotentiary to Genoa in years IV to VI. While in Genoa during the transition from the rule of the oligarchy to the Ligurian Republic in June 1797 he came into conflict with Jean Lannes, the future Marshall. Lannes' blunt speech threatened to undo Faipoult's diplomacy. Lannes accused Faipoult with meddling in military affairs. Napoleon had to intervene to smooth out the dispute.

Napoleon wanted to take Faipoult on the expedition to Egypt. However he was charged in turn with missions to Milan, Rome and Naples, which kept him in Italy. Failpoult was commissioner of the French government in Italy from years VI to VII. He organized most of the small republics that were founded at that time. His quarrel with Jean Étienne Championnet in Naples were denounced by Bertrand du Calvados, and he was forced to go into hiding until the coup of 18 Brumaire VIII (9 November 1799).

== First Empire ==
Bonaparte named Faipoult Prefect of the Scheldt department on 9 March 1800. He was made a member of the Legion of Honour on 25 Prairial XII (14 June 1806). Accusations of negligence reached Napoleon, who dismissed him on 18 September 1808. The accusations proved false. Joseph Bonaparte, then king of Spain, compensated him with the position of his Minister of Finance. Faipoult did not return to France until 1813.

During the Hundred Days of 1815 when Napoleon returned to power, Faipoult was prefect of Saône-et-Loire from 7 May to 30 July 1815. He defended Mâcon against the allies. He opened the gates of the city of Macon to the Austrians when authorized by Marshal Louis-Gabriel Suchet. Faipoult was then arrested, and retired to Belgium. He returned to Paris in 1816.

Guillaume-Charles Faipoult died in Augy, Yonne, on 8 October 1817. He was survived by one daughter, who was married to the baron Louis de Séganville, a colonel of the hussars, commander of the 2d Hussar regiment.

== Selected publications ==
France

- France; Guillaume Charles FAIPOULT DE MAISONCELLE (1789). Situation actuelle des finances de la France et de l'Angleterre. [By G. C. Faipoult de Maisoncelle.].
- Guillaume Charles Faipoult de Maisoncelle (1792). Discours prononcé à la Société patriotique de la Section du Luxembourg, dans sa séance du 6 mars, par G. Charles Faipoult, électeur: sur les effets qu'on doit attendre des Sóctiétés patriotiques. De l'Imprimerie de Pougin.
- Guillaume Charles FAIPOULT DE MAISONCELLE (1795). Essai Sur Les Finances. pp. 43.
- Guillaume Charles Faipoult de Maisoncelle (1796). Le ministre des finances, aux administrateurs du département de l'Ain.

Italy

- Libertà, eguaglianza. Repubblica francese. Roma 25. pratile anno 6. dell'era repubblicana. I Commissarii del Direttorio escutivo della Repubblica francese inviati a Roma ai consoli della Repubblica romana... [Ordre]...(Signé : Florens, Faipoult)
- Liberté, égalité. République française. [Ordre]. Commission du directoire exécutif de la République française à Rome. Rome le 11. prairial an 6e. de l'ère républicaine... (Signé : Daunou, Florent, Faipoult,...)
- Liberté, égalité. Commission du Directoire exécutif de la République française à Rome. Rome, le 29 ventose an. 6. de la République française une et indivisible. [Décret]... (Signé : Faipoult, Daunou, Florens, Monge)
- Liberté, égalité. Au nom de la république française. Loi portant que l'armée française a bien mérité de la patrie. Du 15 ventose, an 6. de la République française une et indivisible... (Signé : Merlin,...) - Liberté, égalité. Commission du Directoire exécutif de la République française. Rome le vingt'huit ventose an 6. de l'ère républic... au citoyen Dallemagne général de division commandant les troupes françaises à Rome... (Signé : Faipoul, Daunou, Florent, Monge)
- Libertà, eguaglianza. Republica francese. Roma 24. pratile anno 6. dell'era repubblicana. I Commissarii del Direttorio esecutivo della Republica francese in Roma al Consolato... [Invito]... (Signé : Florent, Faipoult) - [Decreto del Consolato]... (Signé : Toriglioni)
- Libertà, eguaglianza. Repubblica francese. Ordine dei commissari del direttorio esecutivo della Repubblica francese in Roma. Roma 11. pratile anno 6. dell'era repubblicana... (Sottoscritti : Florent, Faipoult, Daunou,...)
- Libertà, eguaglianza. In nome della Republica francese. Legge portante che l'armata francese al Campidoglio ha ben meritato della patria. De 15' ventoso anno 6. della Repubblica francese una ed indivisibile... (Sottoscritto : Merlin,...) - Libertà, eguaglianza. Commissione del Direttorio escutivo della Repubblica francese in Roma. Roma li 28. ventoso an. 6. dell'era republicana... al cittadino Dallemagne generale di divisione commandante le truppe francesi in Roma... (Sottoscritto : Faipoul, Daunou, Florent, Monge)
- Libertà, eguaglianza. Commissione del Direttorio esecutivo della Republica francese in Roma. Roma li 29. ventoso, an 6. della Republica francese una ed indivisibile. [Decreto]... (Sottoscritti : Faipoult, Daunou, Florens, Monge)

Scheldt

- Guillaume Charles Faipoult de Maisoncelle (1801). Discours prononcé au temple de la loi. A. B. Stéven.
- Guillaume Charles Faipoult de Maisoncelle; Jan Baptist Hellebaut (1801). Discours prononcés par le citoyen Faipoult, Préfet du Département de l'Escaut, et par le citoyen Hellebaut, ... A l'occasion de la Distribution ordinaire des prix aux élèves de l'académie de Peinture, Sculpture et Architecture à Gand, le 25 Messidor an dix, dans la grande Salle de l'Hôtel de Ville de Gand. Chez P. F. De Goesin-Verhaeghe.
- Guillaume Charles Faipoult de Maisoncelle; Jan Baptist Hellebaut (1802). Discours prononcés par le citoyen Faipoult ... et par le citoyen Hellebaut ... à l'occasion de la distribution ordinaire des prix aux élèves de l'académie de peinture, sculpture et architecture à Gand, le 25 Messidor an dix ... chez P. F. de Goesin-Verhaege.
- Guillaume Charles Faipoult de Maisoncelle (1802). Discours prononcé...à la distribution des prix de l'Ecole centrale. A.B. Stéven.
- Guillaume Charles Faipoult de Maisoncelle; Jan Baptist Hellebaut (1803). Discours prononcés par MM. Faipoult, Préfet du Département de l'Escaut, et Hellebaut, Jurisconsulte, Orateur désigné, Lors de la Distribution solennelle des Prix aux Elèves de l'Académie de Dessin de la ville de Gand, Au grand Salon de la Mairie le 7. Thermidor an XII., ... De l'Imprimerie de P. F. de Goesin-Verhaeghe.
- Guillaume Charles Faipoult de Maisoncelle; Jan Baptist Hellebaut (1804). Discours prononcés par MM. Faipoult ... et Hellebaut ... lors de la distribution solennelle des prix au élèves de l'Academie de dessin de Gand ... le 7. Thermidor an XII ... Goesin-Verhaege.
- Guillaume Charles Faipoult de Maisoncelle (1804). Mémoire présenté par le préfet au Conseil général du département, à l'ouverture de sa session de l'an 12, le 15 germinal. Stéven.
- Guillaume Charles Faipoult de Maisoncelle (1804). Mémoire présenté par le préfet du département de l'escaut au conseil général du département, dans sa session de l'an XIII. Stéven.
- Guillaume Charles Faipoult de Maisoncelle (1960). Mémoire statistique du Département de l'Escaut. Maatschappij voor Geschiedenis en Oudheidkunde te Gent. p. 205.
