= Gy-l'Évêque =

- Commune
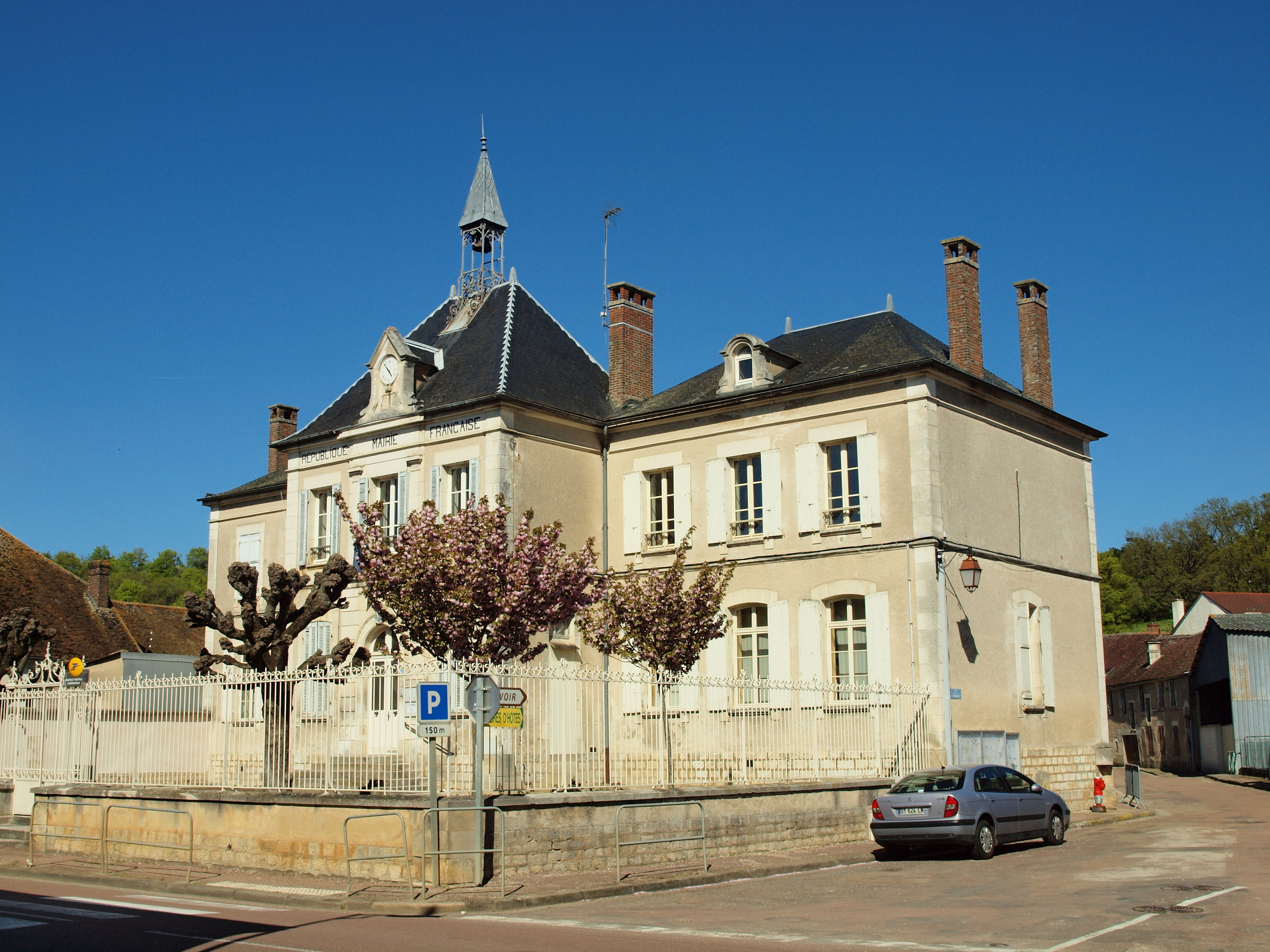
- The town hall in Gy-l'Évêque
- Location of Gy-l'Évêque
- Location within France Location within Bourgogne-Franche-Comté
- Coordinates: 47°43′20″N 3°32′57″E
- Country: France
- Region: Bourgogne-Franche-Comté
- Department: Yonne
- Arrondissement: Auxerre
- Canton: Vincelles
- Intercommunality: CA Auxerrois

Government
  - Mayor (2020–2026): Jean-Luc Bretagne
- Area^{1}: 15.02 km^{2} (5.80 sq mi)
- Highest elevation: 298 m (978 ft)
- Lowest elevation: 165 m (541 ft)
- Population (2023): 442
  - Density: 29.4/km^{2} (76.2/sq mi)
- Time zone: UTC+01:00 (CET)
  - Summer (DST): UTC+02:00 (CEST)
- INSEE/Postal code: 89199 /89580
- ^{1} French Land Register data, which excludes lakes, ponds, glaciers > 1 km^{2} (0.386 sq mi or 247 acres) and river estuaries.

Gy-l'Évêque (French pronunciation: [ʒi levɛk]) is a commune in the Yonne department in Bourgogne-Franche-Comté in north-central France.

== See also ==
- Communes of the Yonne department
