= Venoy =

- Commune
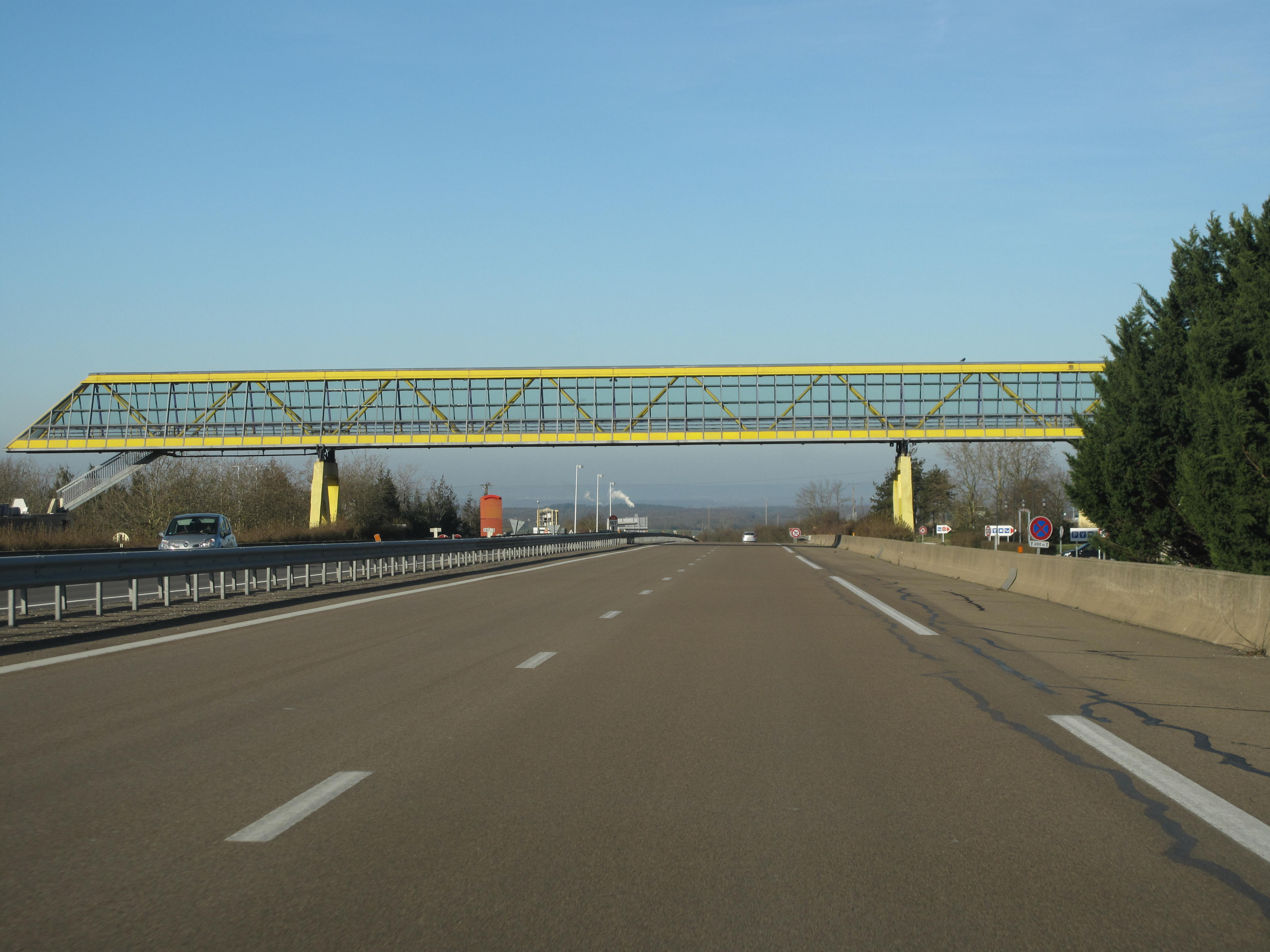
- The rest area footbridge, over the A6, in Venoy
- Location of Venoy
- Location within France Location within Bourgogne-Franche-Comté
- Coordinates: 47°48′23″N 3°38′16″E
- Country: France
- Region: Bourgogne-Franche-Comté
- Department: Yonne
- Arrondissement: Auxerre
- Canton: Auxerre-3
- Intercommunality: CA Auxerrois

Government
  - Mayor (2020–2026): Christophe Bonnefond
- Area^{1}: 22.74 km^{2} (8.78 sq mi)
- Highest elevation: 289 m (948 ft)
- Lowest elevation: 121 m (397 ft)
- Population (2023): 1,741
  - Density: 76.56/km^{2} (198.3/sq mi)
- Time zone: UTC+01:00 (CET)
  - Summer (DST): UTC+02:00 (CEST)
- INSEE/Postal code: 89438 /89290
- ^{1} French Land Register data, which excludes lakes, ponds, glaciers > 1 km^{2} (0.386 sq mi or 247 acres) and river estuaries.

Venoy (French pronunciation: [vənwa]) is a commune in the Yonne department in Bourgogne-Franche-Comté in north-central France.

The commune of Venoy groups seventeen hamlets: Venoy (the main village), La Brosse, Le Buisson, La Chapelle-le-Bas, La Chapelle-le-Haut, La Coudre, Curly, Égriselles, La Belle-Étoile, Montallery, Montpierreux, Montreuche, Pontagny, Sainte-Anne, Soleines-le-Bas, Soleines-le-Milieu, Soleines-le-Haut.

== See also ==
- Communes of the Yonne department
