= Monéteau =

- Commune
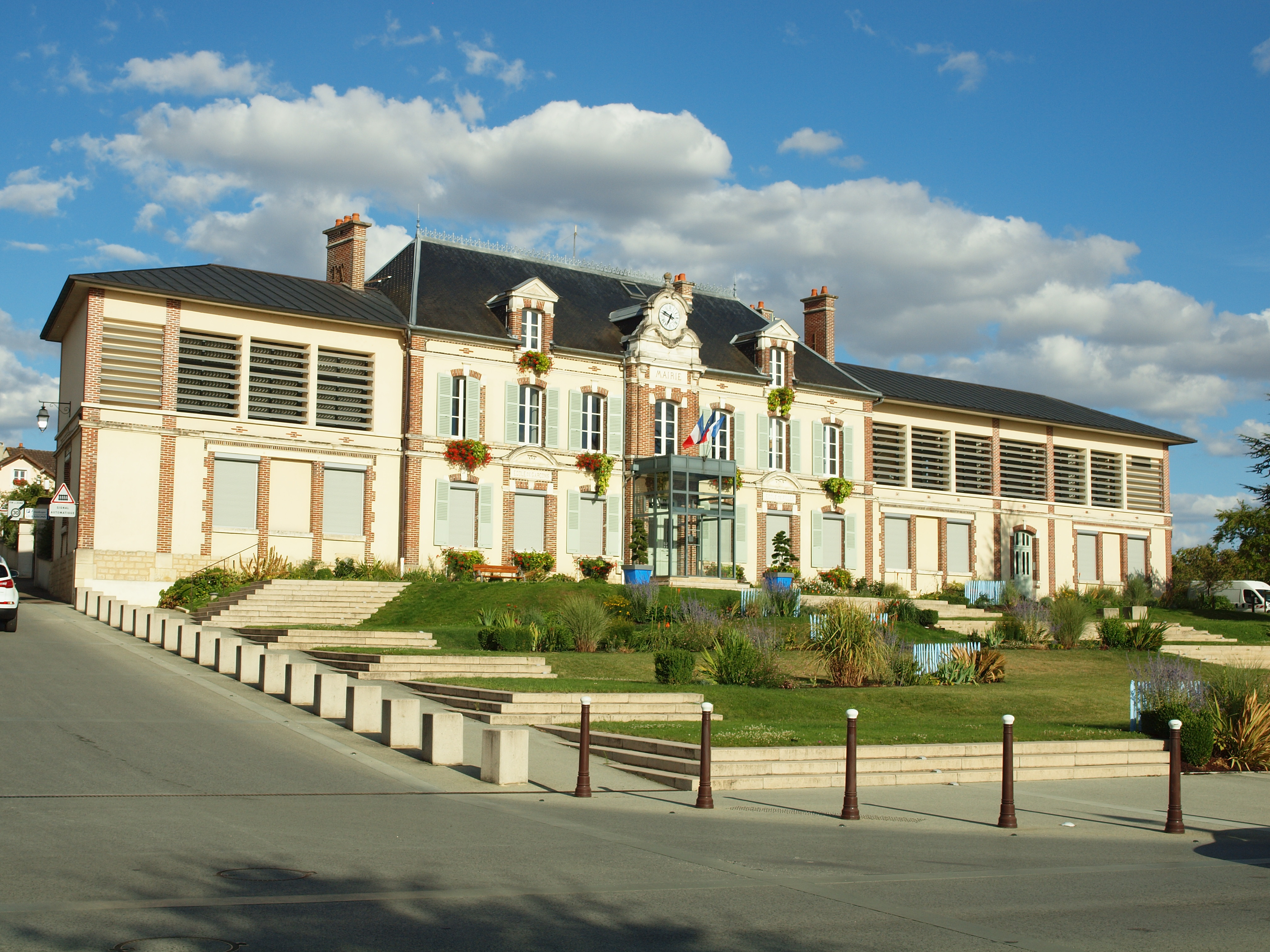
- The town hall in Monéteau

- Coat of arms
- Location of Monéteau
- Location within France Location within Bourgogne-Franche-Comté
- Coordinates: 47°51′03″N 3°34′45″E
- Country: France
- Region: Bourgogne-Franche-Comté
- Department: Yonne
- Arrondissement: Auxerre
- Canton: Auxerre-2
- Intercommunality: CA Auxerrois

Government
  - Mayor (2020–2026): Arminda Guiblain
- Area^{1}: 18.19 km^{2} (7.02 sq mi)
- Highest elevation: 181 m (594 ft)
- Lowest elevation: 88 m (289 ft)
- Population (2023): 4,114
  - Density: 226.2/km^{2} (585.8/sq mi)
- Time zone: UTC+01:00 (CET)
  - Summer (DST): UTC+02:00 (CEST)
- INSEE/Postal code: 89263 /89470
- ^{1} French Land Register data, which excludes lakes, ponds, glaciers > 1 km^{2} (0.386 sq mi or 247 acres) and river estuaries.

Monéteau (French pronunciation: [mɔneto]) is a commune in the Yonne department, Bourgogne-Franche-Comté, north central France. In 1973 it absorbed the former commune Sougères-sur-Sinotte.

== Population ==
Population data refer to the area corresponding with the commune as of January 2025.

Historical population
Year	Pop.	±% p.a.
1968	1,985	—
1975	2,869	+5.40%
1982	3,821	+4.18%
1990	4,239	+1.31%
1999	4,226	−0.03%
2007	3,826	−1.24%
2012	3,999	+0.89%
2017	3,985	−0.07%
2023	4,114	+0.53%
Source: INSEE

== See also ==
- Communes of the Yonne department
