= Lindry =

- Commune
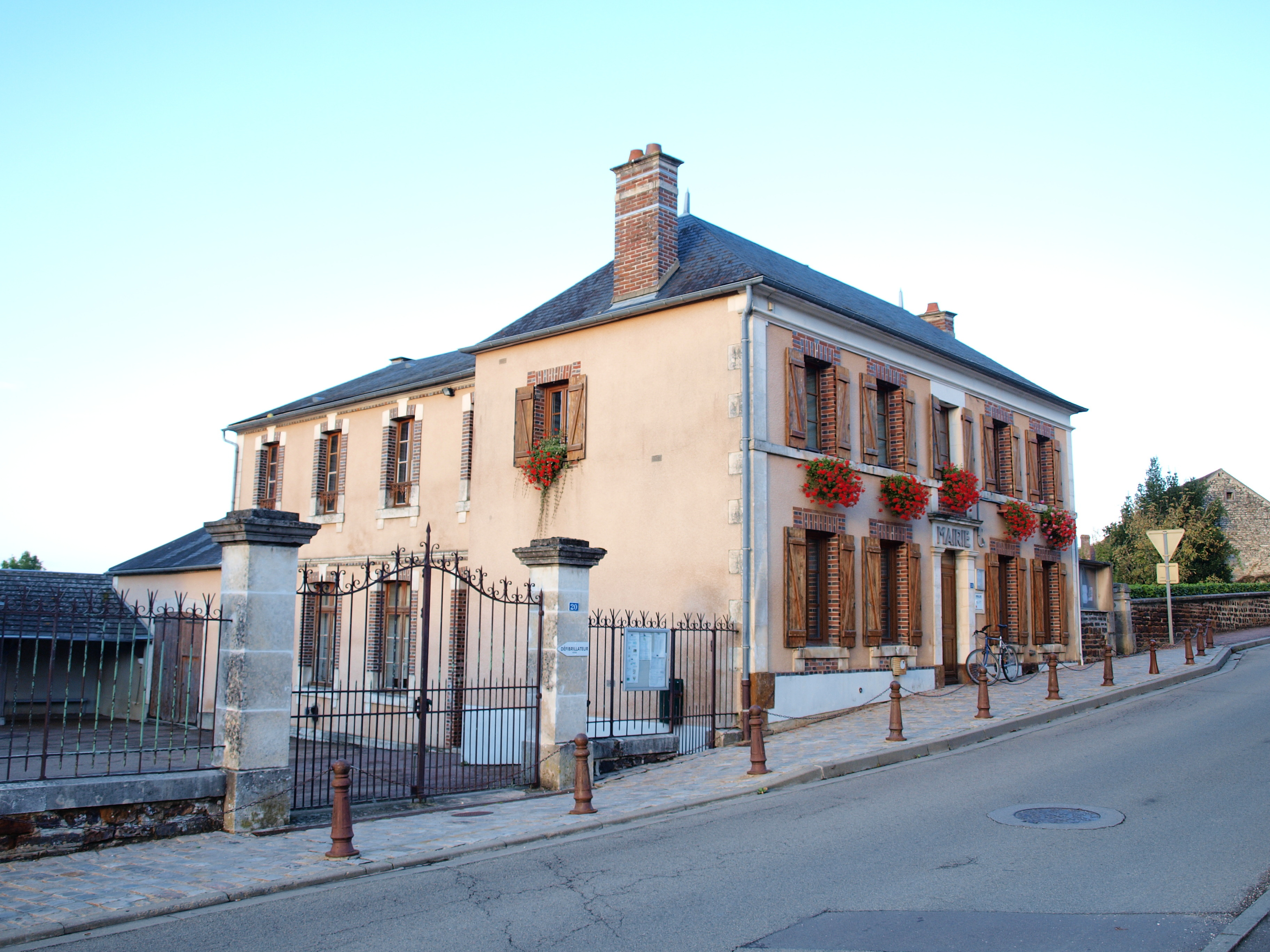
- The town hall in Lindry

- Coat of arms
- Location of Lindry
- Location within France Location within Bourgogne-Franche-Comté
- Coordinates: 47°48′03″N 3°25′12″E
- Country: France
- Region: Bourgogne-Franche-Comté
- Department: Yonne
- Arrondissement: Auxerre
- Canton: Auxerre-1
- Intercommunality: CA Auxerrois

Government
  - Mayor (2020–2026): Michaël Taton
- Area^{1}: 15.23 km^{2} (5.88 sq mi)
- Highest elevation: 272 m (892 ft)
- Lowest elevation: 140 m (460 ft)
- Population (2023): 1,326
  - Density: 87.07/km^{2} (225.5/sq mi)
- Time zone: UTC+01:00 (CET)
  - Summer (DST): UTC+02:00 (CEST)
- INSEE/Postal code: 89228 /89240
- ^{1} French Land Register data, which excludes lakes, ponds, glaciers > 1 km^{2} (0.386 sq mi or 247 acres) and river estuaries.

Lindry (French pronunciation: [lɛ̃dʁi]) is a commune in the Yonne department in Bourgogne-Franche-Comté in north-central France.

== See also ==
- Communes of the Yonne department
