= Vallan =

- Commune
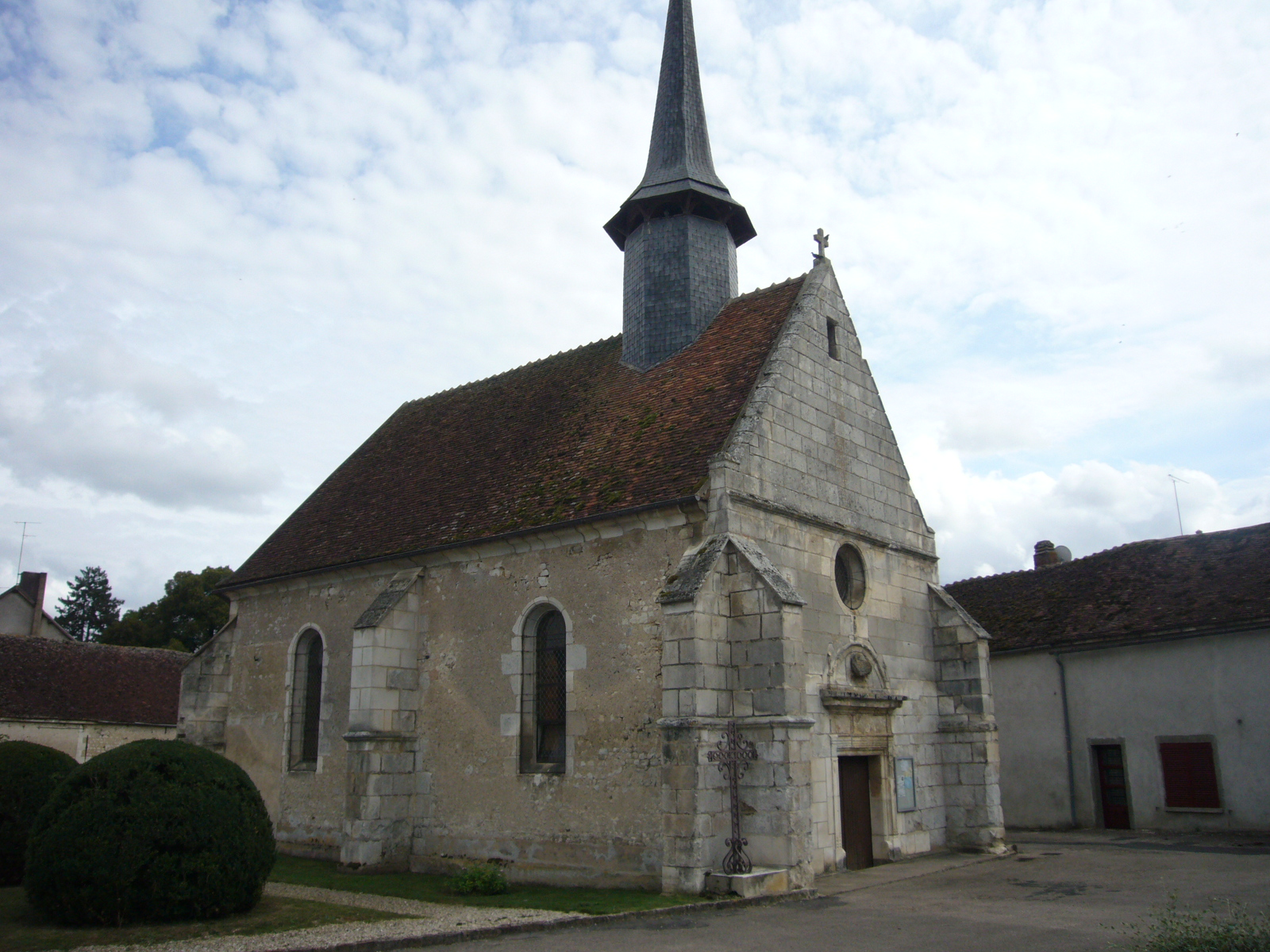
- The church in Vallan

- Coat of arms
- Location of Vallan
- Location within France Location within Bourgogne-Franche-Comté
- Coordinates: 47°44′44″N 3°32′22″E
- Country: France
- Region: Bourgogne-Franche-Comté
- Department: Yonne
- Arrondissement: Auxerre
- Canton: Auxerre-4
- Intercommunality: CA Auxerrois

Government
  - Mayor (2020–2026): Bernard Riant
- Area^{1}: 11.70 km^{2} (4.52 sq mi)
- Highest elevation: 226 m (741 ft)
- Lowest elevation: 133 m (436 ft)
- Population (2023): 674
  - Density: 57.6/km^{2} (149/sq mi)
- Time zone: UTC+01:00 (CET)
  - Summer (DST): UTC+02:00 (CEST)
- INSEE/Postal code: 89427 /89580
- ^{1} French Land Register data, which excludes lakes, ponds, glaciers > 1 km^{2} (0.386 sq mi or 247 acres) and river estuaries.

Vallan (French pronunciation: [valɑ̃]) is a commune in the Yonne department in Bourgogne-Franche-Comté in north-central France.

== See also ==
- Communes of the Yonne department
