= Perrigny, Yonne =

Perrigny
- Commune
- Coat of arms
- Location of Perrigny
- Location within France Location within Bourgogne-Franche-Comté
- Coordinates: 47°49′15″N 3°32′19″E
- Country: France
- Region: Bourgogne-Franche-Comté
- Department: Yonne
- Arrondissement: Auxerre
- Canton: Auxerre-2
- Intercommunality: CA Auxerrois

Government
  - Mayor (2020–2026): Emmanuel Chanut
- Area^{1}: 12.62 km^{2} (4.87 sq mi)
- Highest elevation: 177 m (581 ft)
- Lowest elevation: 95 m (312 ft)
- Population (2023): 1,247
  - Density: 98.81/km^{2} (255.9/sq mi)
- Time zone: UTC+01:00 (CET)
  - Summer (DST): UTC+02:00 (CEST)
- INSEE/Postal code: 89295 /89000
- ^{1} French Land Register data, which excludes lakes, ponds, glaciers > 1 km^{2} (0.386 sq mi or 247 acres) and river estuaries.

Perrigny (French pronunciation: [pɛʁiɲi]) is a commune in the Yonne department in Bourgogne-Franche-Comté in north-central France.

== See also ==
- Communes of the Yonne department
