= Saint-Georges-sur-Baulche =

- Commune
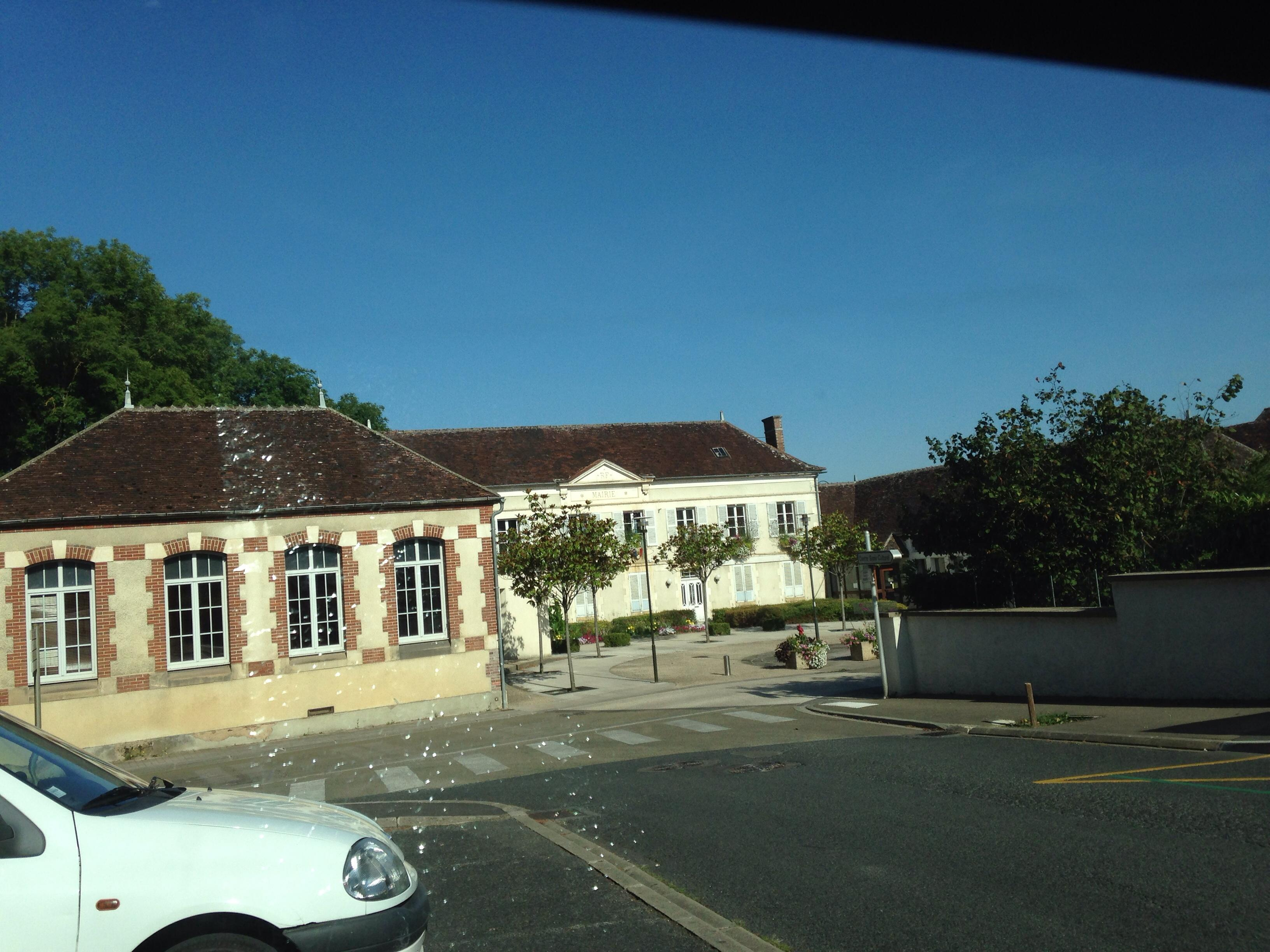
- The town hall in Saint-Georges-sur-Baulche

- Coat of arms
- Location of Saint-Georges-sur-Baulche
- Location within France Location within Bourgogne-Franche-Comté
- Coordinates: 47°48′22″N 3°32′02″E
- Country: France
- Region: Bourgogne-Franche-Comté
- Department: Yonne
- Arrondissement: Auxerre
- Canton: Auxerre-1
- Intercommunality: CA Auxerrois
- Area^{1}: 9.60 km^{2} (3.71 sq mi)
- Highest elevation: 207 m (679 ft)
- Lowest elevation: 111 m (364 ft)
- Population (2023): 3,151
  - Density: 328/km^{2} (850/sq mi)
- Time zone: UTC+01:00 (CET)
  - Summer (DST): UTC+02:00 (CEST)
- INSEE/Postal code: 89346 /89000
- ^{1} French Land Register data, which excludes lakes, ponds, glaciers > 1 km^{2} (0.386 sq mi or 247 acres) and river estuaries.

Saint-Georges-sur-Baulche (French pronunciation: [sɛ̃ ʒɔʁʒ syʁ bolʃ]) is a commune in the Yonne department in Bourgogne-Franche-Comté in north-central France. It is twinned with the affluent English village of Little Aston.

== Population ==
Historical population
Year	Pop.	±% p.a.
1968	1,364	—
1975	2,962	+11.71%
1982	3,385	+1.93%
1990	3,186	−0.75%
1999	3,155	−0.11%
2007	3,261	+0.41%
2012	3,337	+0.46%
2017	3,230	−0.65%
2023	3,151	−0.41%
Source: INSEE

== See also ==
- Communes of the Yonne department
