= Jussy, Yonne =

Jussy
- Commune
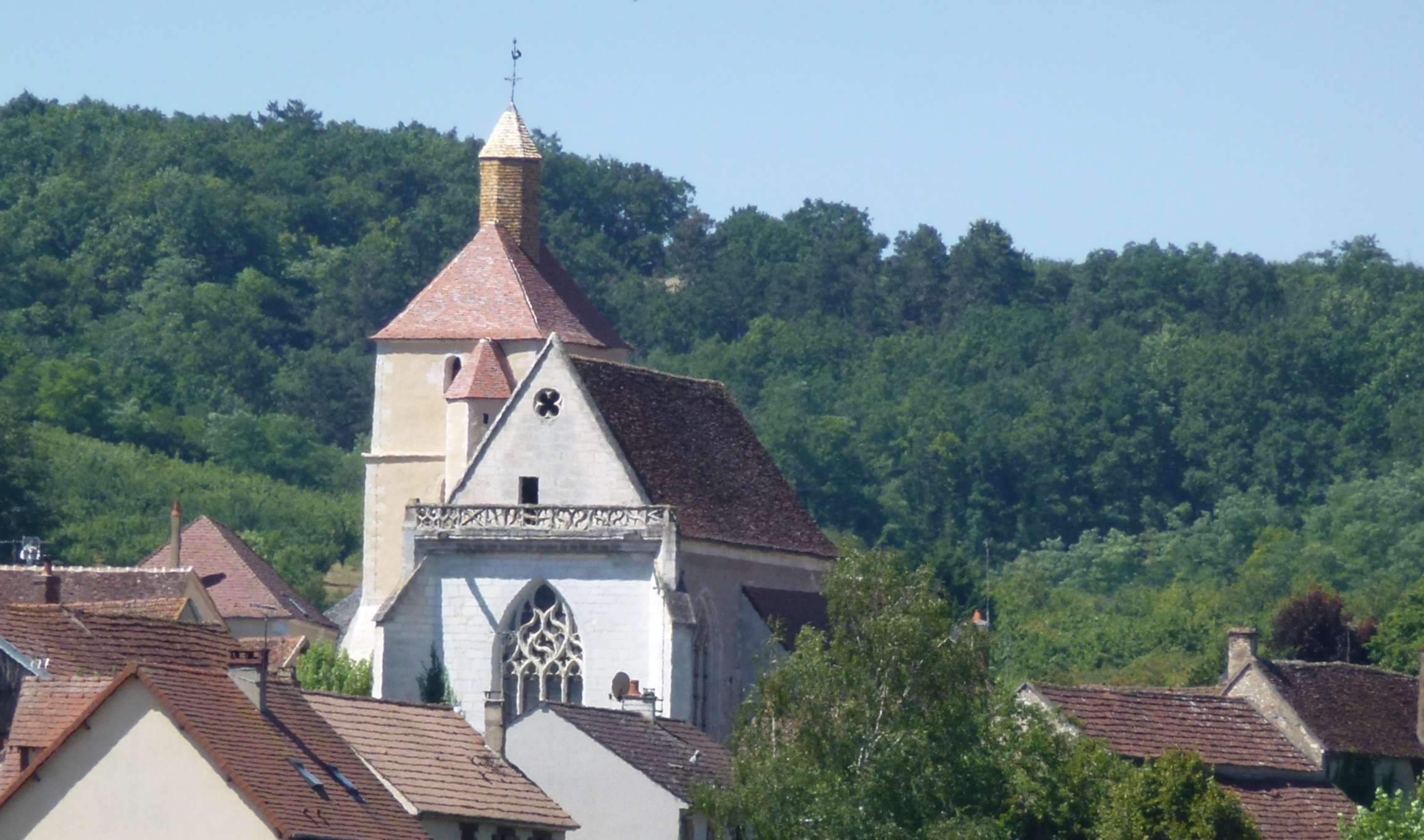
- The church in Jussy
- Location of Jussy
- Location within France Location within Bourgogne-Franche-Comté
- Coordinates: 47°43′19″N 3°35′06″E
- Country: France
- Region: Bourgogne-Franche-Comté
- Department: Yonne
- Arrondissement: Auxerre
- Canton: Vincelles
- Intercommunality: CA Auxerrois

Government
  - Mayor (2020–2026): Patrick Barbotin
- Area^{1}: 7.28 km^{2} (2.81 sq mi)
- Highest elevation: 303 m (994 ft)
- Lowest elevation: 114 m (374 ft)
- Population (2023): 351
  - Density: 48.2/km^{2} (125/sq mi)
- Time zone: UTC+01:00 (CET)
  - Summer (DST): UTC+02:00 (CEST)
- INSEE/Postal code: 89212 /89290
- ^{1} French Land Register data, which excludes lakes, ponds, glaciers > 1 km^{2} (0.386 sq mi or 247 acres) and river estuaries.

Jussy (French pronunciation: [ʒysi]) is a commune in the Yonne department in Bourgogne-Franche-Comté in north-central France. The inhabitants are called Jussiens.

== See also ==
- Communes of the Yonne department
