= Montigny-la-Resle =

- Commune
- Coat of arms
- Location of Montigny-la-Resle
- Location within France Location within Bourgogne-Franche-Comté
- Coordinates: 47°52′00″N 3°40′51″E
- Country: France
- Region: Bourgogne-Franche-Comté
- Department: Yonne
- Arrondissement: Auxerre
- Canton: Chablis
- Intercommunality: CA Auxerrois

Government
  - Mayor (2020–2026): Dominique Torcol
- Area^{1}: 16.19 km^{2} (6.25 sq mi)
- Highest elevation: 287 m (942 ft)
- Lowest elevation: 127 m (417 ft)
- Population (2023): 572
  - Density: 35.3/km^{2} (91.5/sq mi)
- Time zone: UTC+01:00 (CET)
  - Summer (DST): UTC+02:00 (CEST)
- INSEE/Postal code: 89265 /89230
- ^{1} French Land Register data, which excludes lakes, ponds, glaciers > 1 km^{2} (0.386 sq mi or 247 acres) and river estuaries.

Montigny-la-Resle (French pronunciation: [mɔ̃tiɲi la ʁɛl]) is a commune in the Yonne department in Bourgogne-Franche-Comté in north-central France.

== See also ==
- Communes of the Yonne department
