= Communauté d'agglomération de l'Auxerrois =

Auxerrois
- Communauté d'agglomération
- Interactive map of Auxerrois
- Coordinates: 47°47′N 03°35′E
- Country: France
- Region: Bourgogne-Franche-Comté
- Department: Yonne
- No. of communes: {{{nbcomm}}}
- Established: 2017
- Area: 434.0 km^{2} (167.6 sq mi)
- Population (2019): 67,651
  - Density: 155.9/km^{2} (403.7/sq mi)
- Website: www.agglo-auxerrois.fr

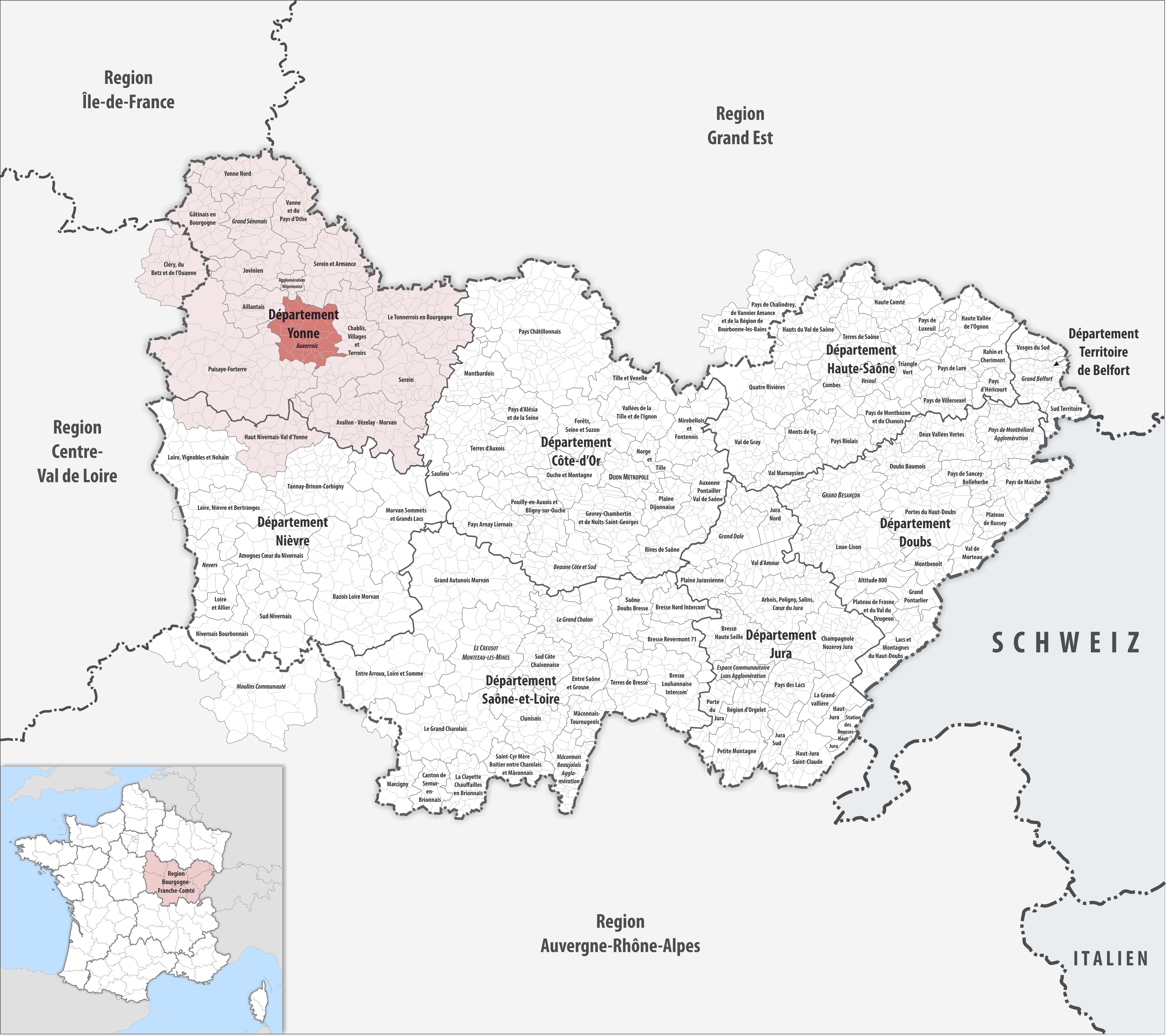
The Auxerrois Community Associations

Communauté d'agglomération de l'Auxerrois is the communauté d'agglomération, an intercommunal structure, centred on the town of Auxerre. It is located in the Yonne department, in the Bourgogne-Franche-Comté region, central France. Created in 2017, its seat is in Auxerre. Its area is 434.0 km^{2}. Its population was 67,651 in 2019, of which 34,451 in Auxerre proper.

== Composition ==
The communauté d'agglomération consists of the following 29 communes:

1. Appoigny
2. Augy
3. Auxerre
4. Bleigny-le-Carreau
5. Branches
6. Champs-sur-Yonne
7. Charbuy
8. Chevannes
9. Chitry
10. Coulanges-la-Vineuse
11. Escamps
12. Escolives-Sainte-Camille
13. Gurgy
14. Gy-l'Évêque
15. Irancy
16. Jussy
17. Lindry
18. Monéteau
19. Montigny-la-Resle
20. Perrigny
21. Quenne
22. Saint-Bris-le-Vineux
23. Saint-Georges-sur-Baulche
24. Vallan
25. Venoy
26. Villefargeau
27. Villeneuve-Saint-Salves
28. Vincelles
29. Vincelottes
