= Bleigny-le-Carreau =

- Commune
- Location of Bleigny-le-Carreau
- Location within France Location within Bourgogne-Franche-Comté
- Coordinates: 47°50′11″N 3°41′01″E
- Country: France
- Region: Bourgogne-Franche-Comté
- Department: Yonne
- Arrondissement: Auxerre
- Canton: Auxerre-3
- Intercommunality: CA Auxerrois

Government
  - Mayor (2020–2026): Frédéric Petit
- Area^{1}: 10.29 km^{2} (3.97 sq mi)
- Highest elevation: 291 m (955 ft)
- Lowest elevation: 149 m (489 ft)
- Population (2023): 279
  - Density: 27.1/km^{2} (70.2/sq mi)
- Time zone: UTC+01:00 (CET)
  - Summer (DST): UTC+02:00 (CEST)
- INSEE/Postal code: 89045 /89230
- ^{1} French Land Register data, which excludes lakes, ponds, glaciers > 1 km^{2} (0.386 sq mi or 247 acres) and river estuaries.

Bleigny-le-Carreau (French pronunciation: [blɛɲi lə kaʁo]) is a commune in the Yonne department in Bourgogne-Franche-Comté in north-central France.

== See also ==
- Communes of the Yonne department
