= Coulanges-la-Vineuse =

- Commune
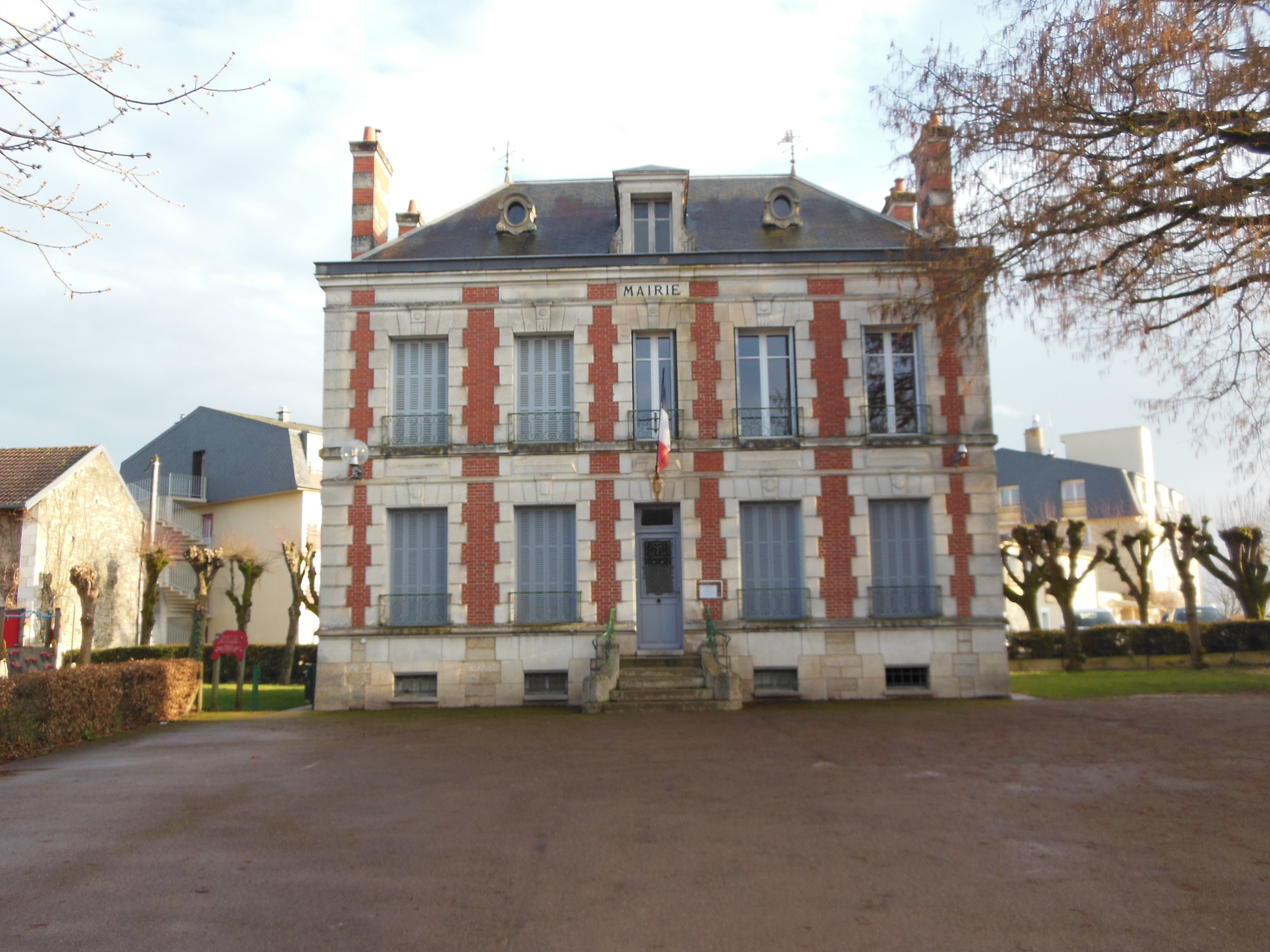
- The town hall in Coulanges-la-Vineuse

- Coat of arms
- Location of Coulanges-la-Vineuse
- Location within France Location within Bourgogne-Franche-Comté
- Coordinates: 47°42′04″N 3°34′55″E
- Country: France
- Region: Bourgogne-Franche-Comté
- Department: Yonne
- Arrondissement: Auxerre
- Canton: Vincelles
- Intercommunality: CA Auxerrois

Government
  - Mayor (2020–2026): Odile Maltoff
- Area^{1}: 10.59 km^{2} (4.09 sq mi)
- Highest elevation: 292 m (958 ft)
- Lowest elevation: 115 m (377 ft)
- Population (2023): 783
  - Density: 73.9/km^{2} (191/sq mi)
- Time zone: UTC+01:00 (CET)
  - Summer (DST): UTC+02:00 (CEST)
- INSEE/Postal code: 89118 /89580
- ^{1} French Land Register data, which excludes lakes, ponds, glaciers > 1 km^{2} (0.386 sq mi or 247 acres) and river estuaries.

Coulanges-la-Vineuse (French pronunciation: [kulɑ̃ʒ la vinøz]) is a commune in the Yonne department in Bourgogne-Franche-Comté in north-central France. Best known for its wines, Coulanges produces extremely pleasing Red and Rosé wines, similar in style to those of nearby Irancy, although lacking something of the depth and structure. Most of the vines are Pinot Noir, although a few Gamay and Cesar vines remain. Unlike Irancy it is yet to win its own Village Appellation and the wines are labelled under the regional appellation Bourgogne Coulanges-la-Vineuse.

== See also ==
- Communes of the Yonne department
