= Chevannes, Yonne =

Chevannes
- Commune
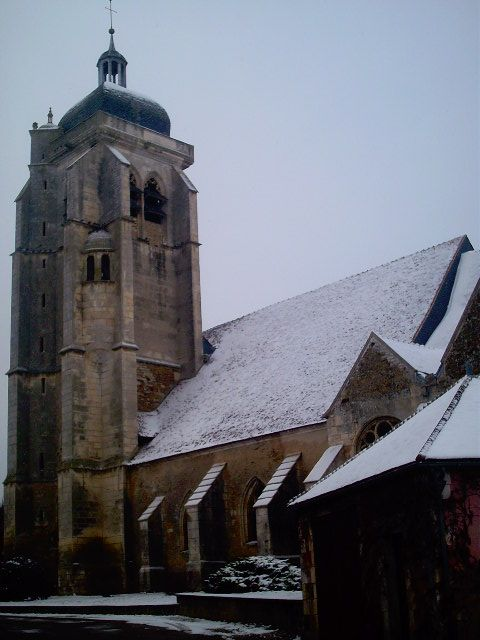
- The church in Chevannes

- Coat of arms
- Location of Chevannes
- Location within France Location within Bourgogne-Franche-Comté
- Coordinates: 47°45′09″N 3°29′33″E
- Country: France
- Region: Bourgogne-Franche-Comté
- Department: Yonne
- Arrondissement: Auxerre
- Canton: Auxerre-4
- Intercommunality: CA Auxerrois

Government
  - Mayor (2020–2026): Dominique Chambenoit
- Area^{1}: 23.54 km^{2} (9.09 sq mi)
- Highest elevation: 251 m (823 ft)
- Lowest elevation: 126 m (413 ft)
- Population (2023): 2,137
  - Density: 90.78/km^{2} (235.1/sq mi)
- Time zone: UTC+01:00 (CET)
  - Summer (DST): UTC+02:00 (CEST)
- INSEE/Postal code: 89102 /89240
- ^{1} French Land Register data, which excludes lakes, ponds, glaciers > 1 km^{2} (0.386 sq mi or 247 acres) and river estuaries.

Chevannes (French pronunciation: [ʃəvan]) is a commune in the Yonne department in Bourgogne-Franche-Comté in north-central France.

== Population ==
Historical population
Year	Pop.	±% p.a.
1968	846	—
1975	1,143	+4.39%
1982	1,623	+5.14%
1990	1,901	+2.00%
1999	1,958	+0.33%
2007	2,154	+1.20%
2012	2,339	+1.66%
2017	2,178	−1.42%
2023	2,137	−0.32%
Source: INSEE

== See also ==
- Communes of the Yonne department
