= Appoigny =

- Commune
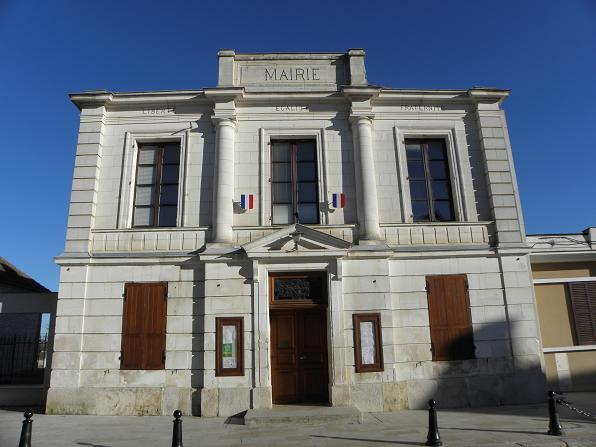
- The town hall in Appoigny

- Coat of arms
- Location of Appoigny
- Location within France Location within Bourgogne-Franche-Comté
- Coordinates: 47°52′41″N 3°31′44″E
- Country: France
- Region: Bourgogne-Franche-Comté
- Department: Yonne
- Arrondissement: Auxerre
- Canton: Auxerre-2
- Intercommunality: CA Auxerrois

Government
  - Mayor (2020–2026): Magloire Siopathis
- Area^{1}: 22.09 km^{2} (8.53 sq mi)
- Highest elevation: 201 m (659 ft)
- Lowest elevation: 82 m (269 ft)
- Population (2023): 3,114
  - Density: 141.0/km^{2} (365.1/sq mi)
- Time zone: UTC+01:00 (CET)
  - Summer (DST): UTC+02:00 (CEST)
- INSEE/Postal code: 89013 /89380
- ^{1} French Land Register data, which excludes lakes, ponds, glaciers > 1 km^{2} (0.386 sq mi or 247 acres) and river estuaries.

Appoigny (French pronunciation: [apwaɲi]) is a commune in the Yonne department in Bourgogne-Franche-Comté in north-central France.

This village with all its flowers is well known for its architectural heritage but also for its hotels and restaurants. The Saint Pierre collegial church—a classified Historic Building—dates back to the 13th century. It has a tower of the 16th century and a magnificent rood screen dating from 1606–1610. The Château de Régennes lies nearby.

== Population ==
Historical population
Year	Pop.	±% p.a.
1968	1,638	—
1975	2,029	+3.11%
1982	2,625	+3.75%
1990	2,755	+0.61%
1999	2,991	+0.92%
2007	3,105	+0.47%
2012	3,117	+0.08%
2017	3,167	+0.32%
2023	3,114	−0.28%
Source: INSEE

== See also ==
- Communes of the Yonne department
