= Vincelottes =

- Commune
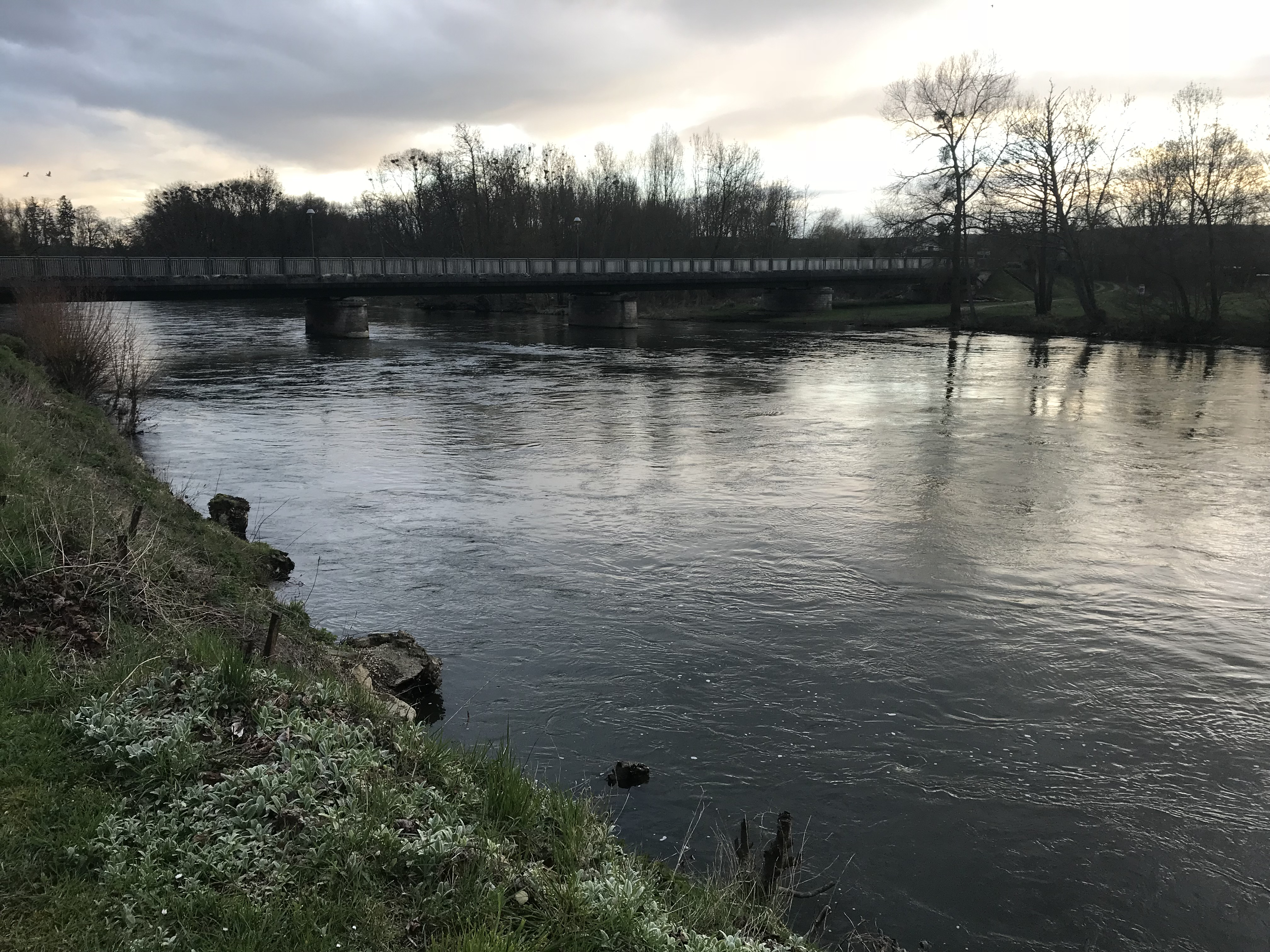
- The Yonne river in Vincelottes
- Location of Vincelottes
- Location within France Location within Bourgogne-Franche-Comté
- Coordinates: 47°42′28″N 3°38′28″E
- Country: France
- Region: Bourgogne-Franche-Comté
- Department: Yonne
- Arrondissement: Auxerre
- Canton: Vincelles
- Intercommunality: CA Auxerrois

Government
  - Mayor (2020–2026): Michel Boubouleix
- Area^{1}: 1.85 km^{2} (0.71 sq mi)
- Highest elevation: 255 m (837 ft)
- Lowest elevation: 103 m (338 ft)
- Population (2023): 285
  - Density: 154/km^{2} (399/sq mi)
- Time zone: UTC+01:00 (CET)
  - Summer (DST): UTC+02:00 (CEST)
- INSEE/Postal code: 89479 /89290
- ^{1} French Land Register data, which excludes lakes, ponds, glaciers > 1 km^{2} (0.386 sq mi or 247 acres) and river estuaries.

Vincelottes (French pronunciation: [vɛ̃slɔt]) is a commune in the Yonne department in Bourgogne-Franche-Comté in north-central France. The bibliographer Jean-Félicissime Adry was born here in 1749.

== See also ==
- Communes of the Yonne department
