= Quenne =

- Commune
- The windfarm in Quenne
- Location of Quenne
- Location within France Location within Bourgogne-Franche-Comté
- Coordinates: 47°46′40″N 3°39′02″E
- Country: France
- Region: Bourgogne-Franche-Comté
- Department: Yonne
- Arrondissement: Auxerre
- Canton: Auxerre-3
- Intercommunality: CA Auxerrois
- Area^{1}: 8.72 km^{2} (3.37 sq mi)
- Highest elevation: 298 m (978 ft)
- Lowest elevation: 125 m (410 ft)
- Population (2023): 479
  - Density: 54.9/km^{2} (142/sq mi)
- Time zone: UTC+01:00 (CET)
  - Summer (DST): UTC+02:00 (CEST)
- INSEE/Postal code: 89319 /89290
- ^{1} French Land Register data, which excludes lakes, ponds, glaciers > 1 km^{2} (0.386 sq mi or 247 acres) and river estuaries.

Quenne is a commune in the Yonne department in Bourgogne-Franche-Comté in north-central France.

== See also ==
- Communes of the Yonne department
