= Escamps, Yonne =

Escamps
- Commune
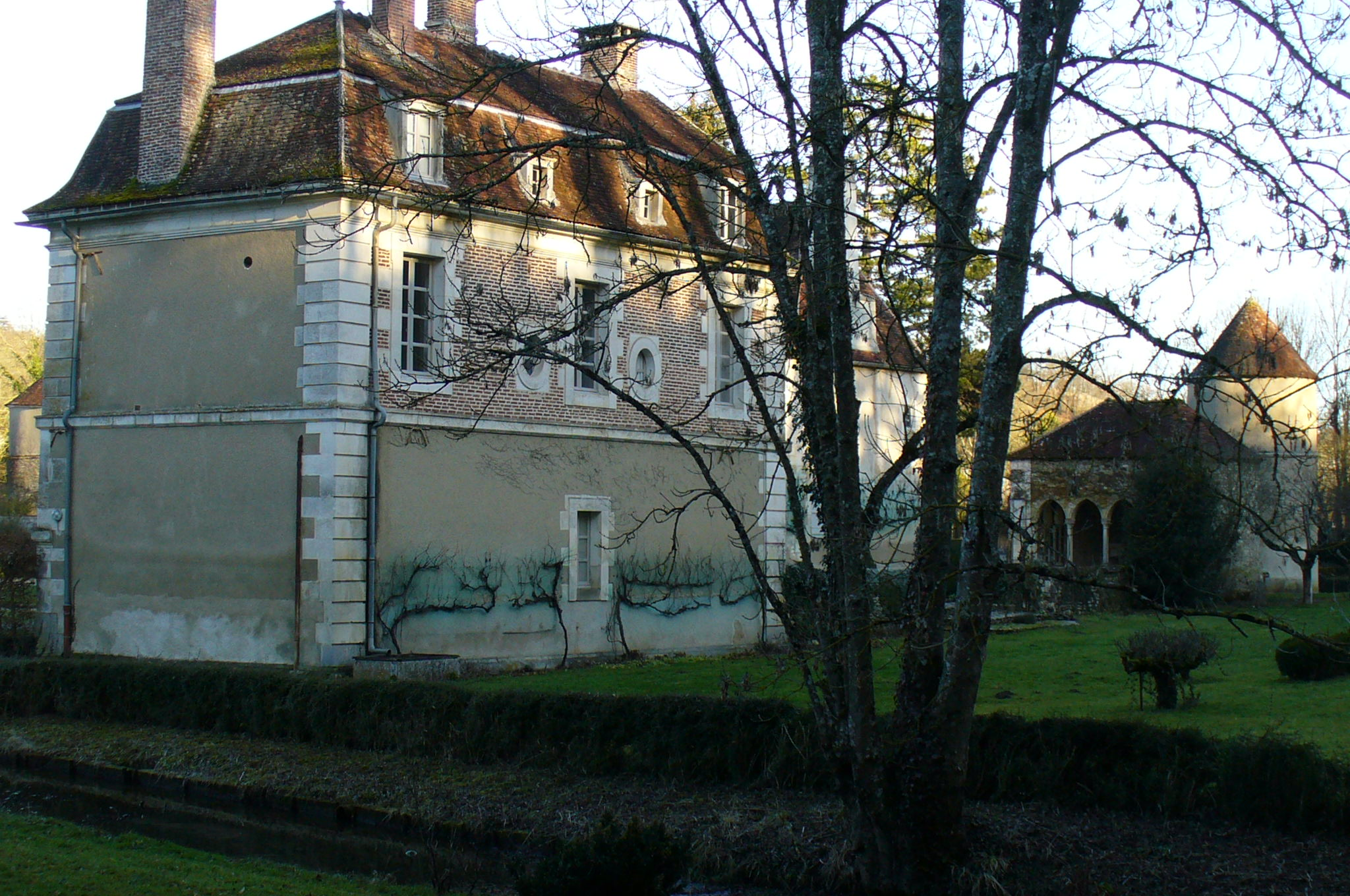
- The chateau of Avigneau in Escamps
- Location of Escamps
- Location within France Location within Bourgogne-Franche-Comté
- Coordinates: 47°43′49″N 3°28′27″E
- Country: France
- Region: Bourgogne-Franche-Comté
- Department: Yonne
- Arrondissement: Auxerre
- Canton: Vincelles
- Intercommunality: CA Auxerrois
- Area^{1}: 22.21 km^{2} (8.58 sq mi)
- Highest elevation: 300 m (980 ft)
- Lowest elevation: 141 m (463 ft)
- Population (2023): 836
  - Density: 37.6/km^{2} (97.5/sq mi)
- Time zone: UTC+01:00 (CET)
  - Summer (DST): UTC+02:00 (CEST)
- INSEE/Postal code: 89154 /89240
- ^{1} French Land Register data, which excludes lakes, ponds, glaciers > 1 km^{2} (0.386 sq mi or 247 acres) and river estuaries.

Escamps (French pronunciation: [ekɑ̃]) is a commune in the Yonne department in Bourgogne-Franche-Comté in north-central France.

== See also ==
- Communes of the Yonne department
