= Chitry =

- Commune
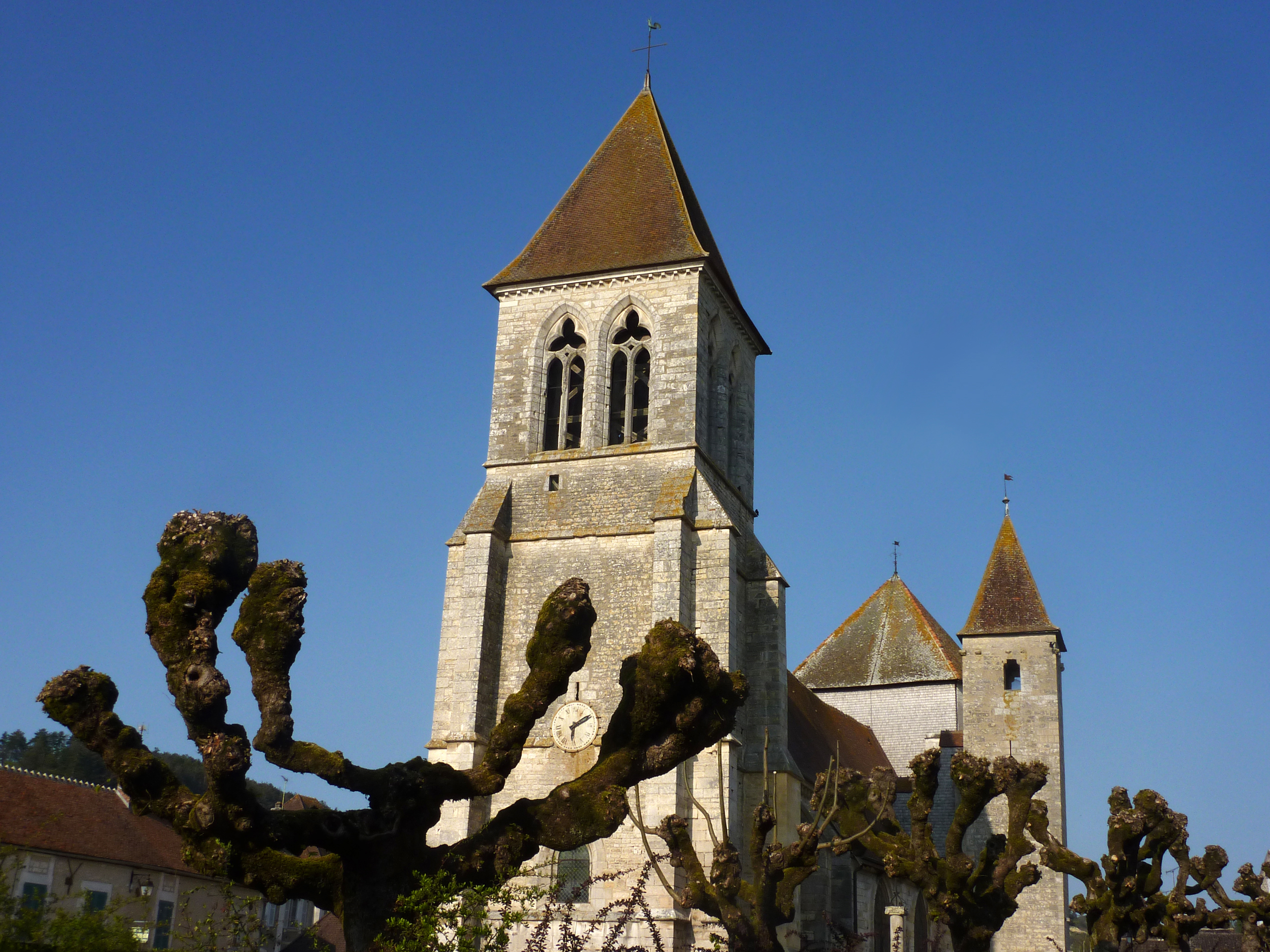
- The church in Chitry

- Coat of arms
- Location of Chitry
- Location within France Location within Bourgogne-Franche-Comté
- Coordinates: 47°45′46″N 3°42′01″E
- Country: France
- Region: Bourgogne-Franche-Comté
- Department: Yonne
- Arrondissement: Auxerre
- Canton: Chablis
- Intercommunality: CA Auxerrois

Government
  - Mayor (2020–2026): Christian Bouley
- Area^{1}: 15.20 km^{2} (5.87 sq mi)
- Highest elevation: 346 m (1,135 ft)
- Lowest elevation: 169 m (554 ft)
- Population (2023): 346
  - Density: 22.8/km^{2} (59.0/sq mi)
- Time zone: UTC+01:00 (CET)
  - Summer (DST): UTC+02:00 (CEST)
- INSEE/Postal code: 89108 /89530
- ^{1} French Land Register data, which excludes lakes, ponds, glaciers > 1 km^{2} (0.386 sq mi or 247 acres) and river estuaries.

Chitry (French pronunciation: [ʃitʁi]) is a commune in the Yonne department in Bourgogne-Franche-Comté in north-central France.

== See also ==
- Communes of the Yonne department
