= Canton of Auxerre-3 =

Coordinates: 47.80°N 3.57°E

The canton of Auxerre-3 is an administrative division of the Yonne department, central France. It was created at the French canton reorganisation which came into effect in March 2015. Its seat is in Auxerre.

It consists of the following communes:

1. Augy
2. Auxerre (partly)
3. Bleigny-le-Carreau
4. Champs-sur-Yonne
5. Quenne
6. Saint-Bris-le-Vineux
7. Venoy
