= Augy, Yonne =

Augy
- Commune
- Coat of arms
- Location of Augy
- Location within France Location within Bourgogne-Franche-Comté
- Coordinates: 47°46′02″N 3°36′39″E
- Country: France
- Region: Bourgogne-Franche-Comté
- Department: Yonne
- Arrondissement: Auxerre
- Canton: Auxerre-3
- Intercommunality: CA Auxerrois

Government
  - Mayor (2020–2026): Nicolas Briolland
- Area^{1}: 5.05 km^{2} (1.95 sq mi)
- Highest elevation: 205 m (673 ft)
- Lowest elevation: 97 m (318 ft)
- Population (2023): 954
  - Density: 189/km^{2} (489/sq mi)
- Time zone: UTC+01:00 (CET)
  - Summer (DST): UTC+02:00 (CEST)
- INSEE/Postal code: 89023 /89290
- ^{1} French Land Register data, which excludes lakes, ponds, glaciers > 1 km^{2} (0.386 sq mi or 247 acres) and river estuaries.

Augy (French pronunciation: [oʒi]) is a commune in the Yonne department in Bourgogne-Franche-Comté in north-central France.

== See also ==
- Communes of the Yonne department
