= Arrondissements of the Yonne department =

Administrative divisions of Yonne, France

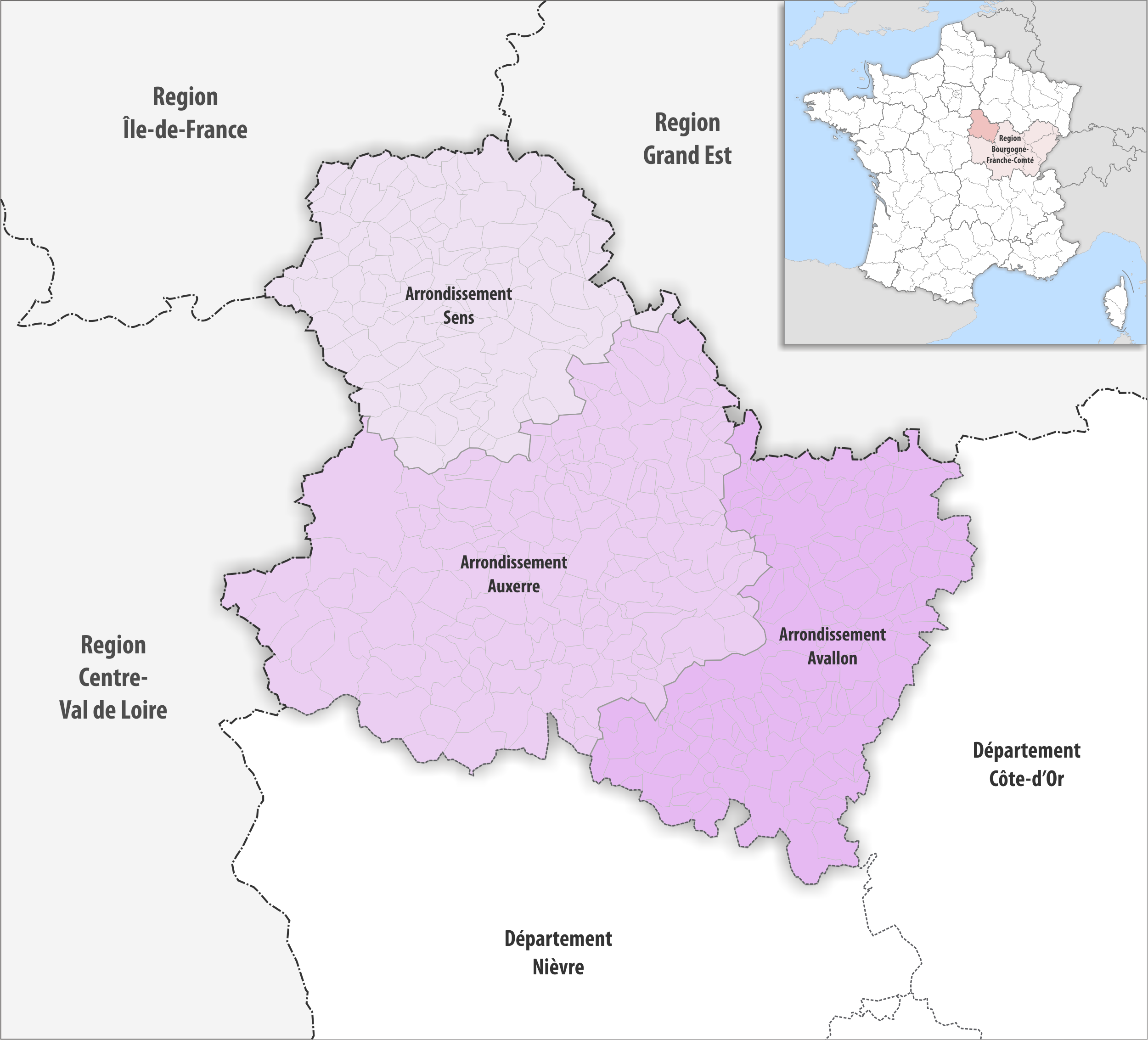
Map of arrondissements of the Yonne department.

The 3 arrondissements of the Yonne department are:

1. Arrondissement of Auxerre, (prefecture of the Yonne department: Auxerre) with 170 communes. The population of the arrondissement was 161,976 in 2021.
2. Arrondissement of Avallon, (subprefecture: Avallon) with 135 communes. The population of the arrondissement was 40,732 in 2021.
3. Arrondissement of Sens, (subprefecture: Sens) with 118 communes. The population of the arrondissement was 130,677 in 2021.

== History ==
In 1800 the arrondissements of Auxerre, Avallon, Joigny, Sens and Tonnerre were established. The arrondissements of Joigny and Tonnerre were abolished in 1926.

The borders of the arrondissements of Yonne were modified in January 2017:

- three communes from the arrondissement of Auxerre to the arrondissement of Avallon
- 12 communes from the arrondissement of Auxerre to the arrondissement of Sens
- 13 communes from the arrondissement of Avallon to the arrondissement of Auxerre
