= Saint-Bris-le-Vineux =

- Commune
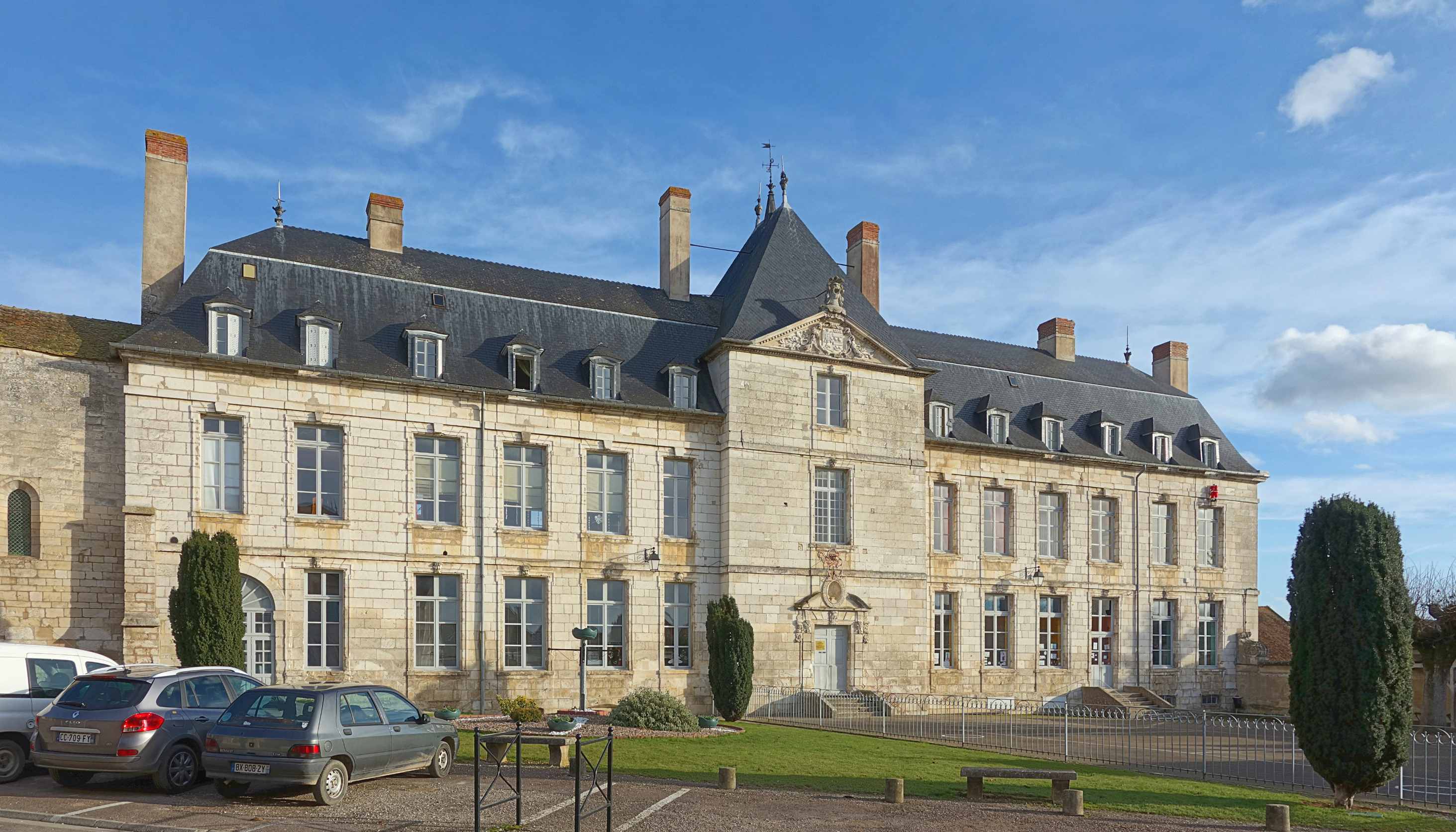
- The town hall in Saint-Bris-le-Vineux

- Coat of arms
- Location of Saint-Bris-le-Vineux
- Location within France Location within Bourgogne-Franche-Comté
- Coordinates: 47°44′39″N 3°39′01″E
- Country: France
- Region: Bourgogne-Franche-Comté
- Department: Yonne
- Arrondissement: Auxerre
- Canton: Auxerre-3
- Intercommunality: CA Auxerrois

Government
  - Mayor (2020–2026): Olivier Felix
- Area^{1}: 31.23 km^{2} (12.06 sq mi)
- Elevation: 167 m (548 ft)
- Highest elevation: 297 m (974 ft)
- Lowest elevation: 102 m (335 ft)
- Population (2023): 1,024
  - Density: 32.79/km^{2} (84.92/sq mi)
- Time zone: UTC+01:00 (CET)
  - Summer (DST): UTC+02:00 (CEST)
- INSEE/Postal code: 89337 /89530
- ^{1} French Land Register data, which excludes lakes, ponds, glaciers > 1 km^{2} (0.386 sq mi or 247 acres) and river estuaries.

Saint-Bris-le-Vineux (French pronunciation: [sɛ̃ bʁi lə vinø]) is a commune in the Yonne department in Bourgogne-Franche-Comté in north-central France.

It lies near Auxerre.

== Twin towns ==
- - Schoden, Germany
- (United Kingdom) - Wrea Green, UK

== See also ==
- Saint-Bris AOC, a white wine from the area around Saint-Bris-le-Vineux, made from Sauvignon variety grapes.
- Communes of the Yonne department
