= Yonne =

Department in Bourgogne-Franche-Comté, France

- Department of France
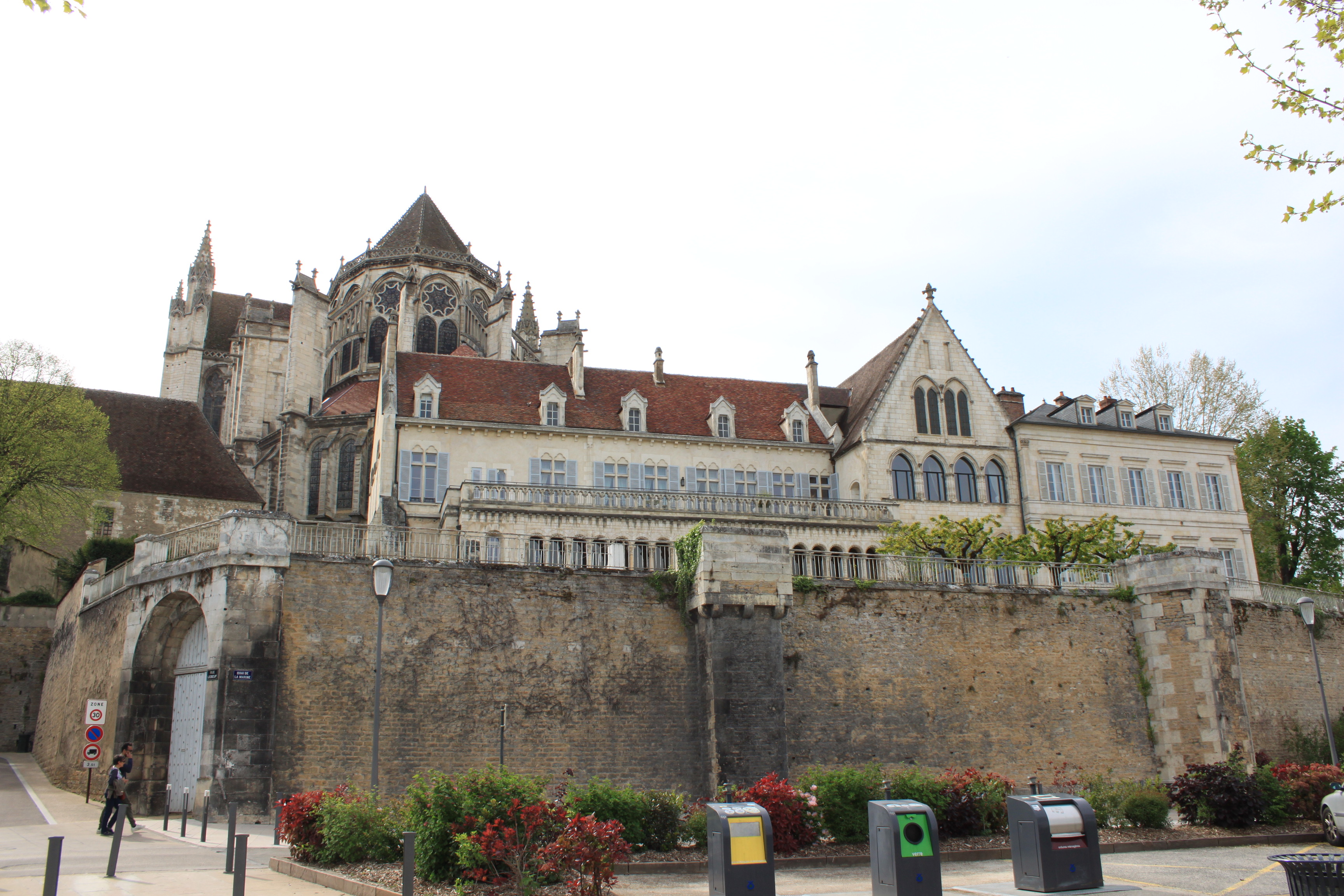
- The Palais épiscopal in Auxerre, which houses the prefecture of Yonne

- Flag Coat of arms

- Location of Yonne in France
- Coordinates: 47°48′N 3°34′E
- Country: France
- Region: Bourgogne-Franche-Comté
- Prefecture: Auxerre
- Subprefectures: Avallon; Sens

Government
  - President of the Departmental Council: Patrick Gendraud (LR)

Area^{1}
  - Total: 7,427 km^{2} (2,868 sq mi)

Population (2023)
  - Total: 332,267
  - Rank: 70th
  - Density: 44.74/km^{2} (115.9/sq mi)
- Time zone: UTC+1 (CET)
  - Summer (DST): UTC+2 (CEST)
- Department number: 89
- Arrondissements: 3
- Cantons: 21
- Communes: 423
- ^1 French Land Register data, which exclude estuaries and lakes, ponds and glaciers larger than 1 km^{2}

Yonne (French: [jɔn], in Burgundian: Ghienne) is a department in the Bourgogne-Franche-Comté region in France. It is named after the river Yonne, which flows through it, in the country's north-central part. One of Bourgogne-Franche-Comté's eight constituent departments, it is located in its northwestern part, bordering Île-de-France. It was created in 1790 during the French Revolution. Its prefecture is Auxerre, with subprefectures in Avallon and Sens. Its INSEE and postcode number is 89.

Yonne is Bourgogne-Franche-Comté's fourth-most populous department, with a population of 332,267 (2023). Its largest city is its prefecture Auxerre, with a population of about 35,000 within city limits and 68,000 in the urban area.

== History ==
The first evidence of occupation in this area is found in the Grottes d'Arcy-sur-Cure, where paintings have been found dating back 28,000 years. The Palaeolithic hunter-gatherers of that time also left behind numerous flint artefacts. The area is believed to have been occupied for about 200,000 years. By 4000 BC, a wave of people arrived from the Danube River region of eastern Europe. They built substantial wooden houses and introduced pottery decorated with the characteristics of the Linear Pottery culture. Further waves of migrants followed, the Chasséen culture, and the Michelsberg culture.

The Celtic tribe in the area were named "Icauna", after the River Yonne which they thought sacred. The region was later occupied by Gallic tribes. In that period, the area came under the control of the Roman Empire, whose chief town was Sens, which they called Agendicum. It was the capital of their province of Gallia Lugdunensis, one of four provinces into which France was divided. The present main roads from Lyon to Boulogne, and from Sens to Alise-Sainte-Reine date from this period. About this time, Auxerre, Tonnerre (Tornodurum) and Avallon were growing in size. In the fourth century, Sens became a walled city. The first bishops were appointed in Sens and Langres, and they influenced the region profoundly because of their power.

In 1771, the north-westerly part of the present department belonged to Prince Francis Xavier of Saxony, the uncle of King Louis XVI. The current Yonne department was organized and defined during the French Revolution, on March 4, 1790, as a result of the passing of an Act on December 22, 1789. It was carved out of parts of the provinces of Burgundy, Champagne and Orléans, and to a lesser extent from parts of the Nivernais and Île-de-France.

== Geography ==
Map of Yonne

Yonne is a department in central France, one of the eight constituent departments of the region of Bourgogne-Franche-Comté. To the northeast lies the department of Aube, to the east lies Côte-d'Or, to the south lies Nièvre, to the west lies Loiret and to the northwest, the department of Seine-et-Marne. The River Yonne flows northwards through the department. Auxerre, the capital of the department, is situated on the River Yonne, and the River Serein joins this a few kilometres north of the city. The Canal de Bourgogne, which connects the Mediterranean Sea with the Atlantic Ocean, joins the River Yonne through locks at Migennes a little further north. The second biggest town is Sens, situated at the confluence of the rivers Vanne and Yonne.

The geology of the department is complex with concentric rings of granite, Jurassic, Cretaceous and Tertiary rocks, and layers of sedimentary rocks. The terrain is mostly a low-lying plateau used for agriculture. The southwestern part is the Puisaye, which has a higher elevation and is more wooded. To the centre and east, the land inclines to the northwest where the higher land of the Tonnerrois region lies. To the east the rock is mostly limestone. The Auxerrois region is renowned for the grapes grown here, which are used in the production of Chablis wine. To the south lies the mountainous massif of Morvan, the highest parts of which are in the neighbouring department of Nièvre. The department has some forested areas but is mainly used for pasture or cultivated for wheat.

=== Principal towns ===
The most populous commune is Auxerre, the prefecture. As of 2023, there are 6 communes with more than 5,000 inhabitants:

Commune	Population (2023)
Auxerre	35,097
Sens	27,106
Joigny	9,016
Migennes	6,688
Avallon	6,305
Villeneuve-sur-Yonne	5,135

== Demographics ==
Population development since 1801:

Historical population

Year	Pop.	±% p.a.
1801	320,596	—
1806	326,548	+0.37%
1821	332,905	+0.13%
1831	352,487	+0.57%
1841	362,961	+0.29%
1851	381,133	+0.49%
1861	370,305	−0.29%
1872	363,608	−0.17%
1881	357,029	−0.20%
1891	344,688	−0.35%
1901	321,062	−0.71%
1911	303,889	−0.55%
1921	273,118	−1.06%
1931	275,755	+0.10%

Year	Pop.	±% p.a.
1936	271,685	−0.30%
1946	266,014	−0.21%
1954	266,410	+0.02%
1962	269,826	+0.16%
1968	283,376	+0.82%
1975	299,851	+0.81%
1982	311,019	+0.52%
1990	323,096	+0.48%
1999	333,221	+0.34%
2007	341,418	+0.30%
2012	341,902	+0.03%
2017	338,291	−0.21%
2023	332,267	−0.30%

== Economy ==
Over fifty percent of the inhabitants of the department are engaged in agricultural activities. Yonne is one of the poorest and most rural departments in France. During the hundred years leading up to 1962, its population declined by around 100,000, while all of the surrounding departments experienced population growth. Yonne had been bypassed by the development of the railways. As French industry flourished elsewhere in the late nineteenth century, the young people left Yonne seeking better opportunities, and the department stagnated.

The viticulture industry was severely affected by the advent of powdery mildew and the arrival of Phylloxera in the nineteenth century; at the same time, the development of the railway network allowed cheaper wines from other regions to undercut Chablis wine in the Paris market. The once-thriving industry never recovered. By 1945, only 4000 hectares of grapevines remained, and only 471 hectares of grapes were grown for Chablis.

More recently, the population trend has been reversed. During the period 1999 to 2007, it rose by 8000 to a total of 341,418. However, with a population of 46 inhabitants per square kilometre, the density in Yonne is still less than half that for the whole of France, which was 100.5 for the same year.

== Politics ==
The president of the Departmental Council is Patrick Gendraud, elected in 2017. In 2015, the General Council of the department was allotted a budget of 410 million euros.

=== Current National Assembly Representatives ===
The department elects three members of parliament to the National Assembly. In the 2012–17 parliamentary term, two represented the right-wing Union for a Popular Movement (UMP) and one the Socialist Party (France) (PS).

Constituency	Member	Party
Yonne's 1st constituency	Daniel Grenon	National Rally
Yonne's 2nd constituency	Sophie-Laurence Roy	The Republicans
Yonne's 3rd constituency	Julien Odoul	National Rally

== Tourism ==
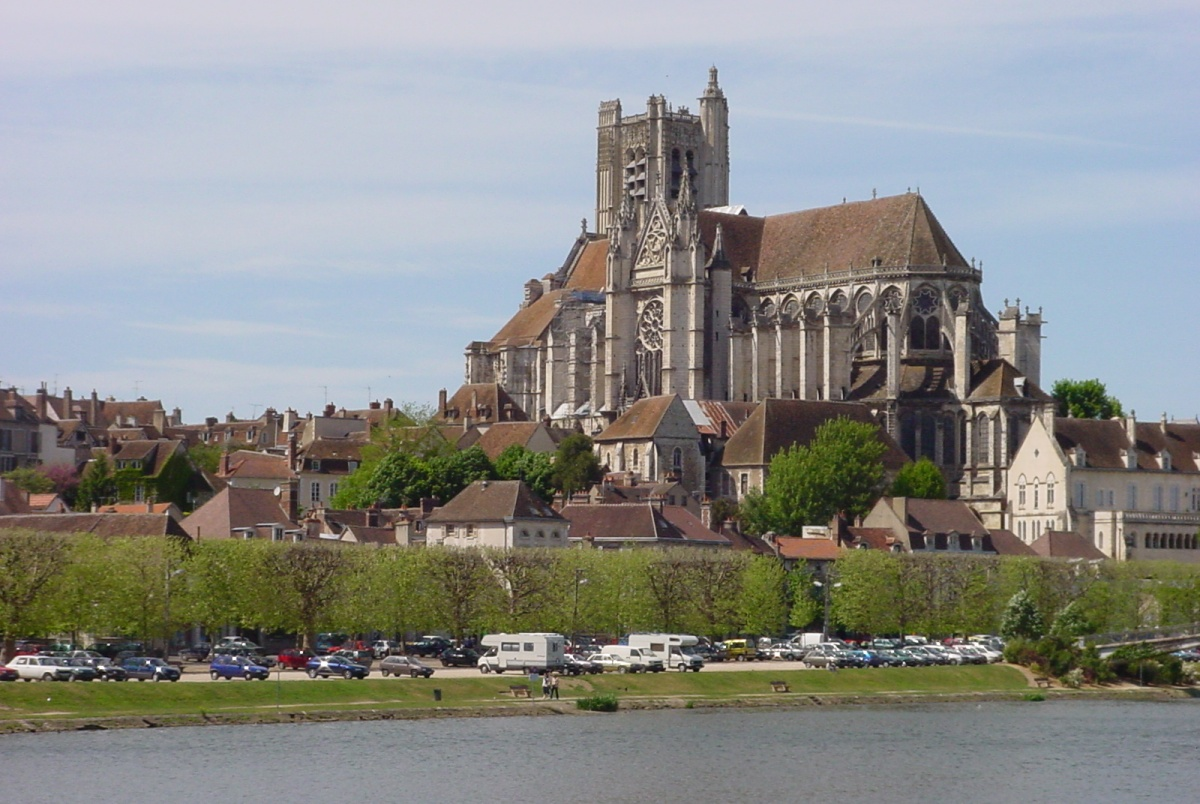
Auxerre and the Yonne River

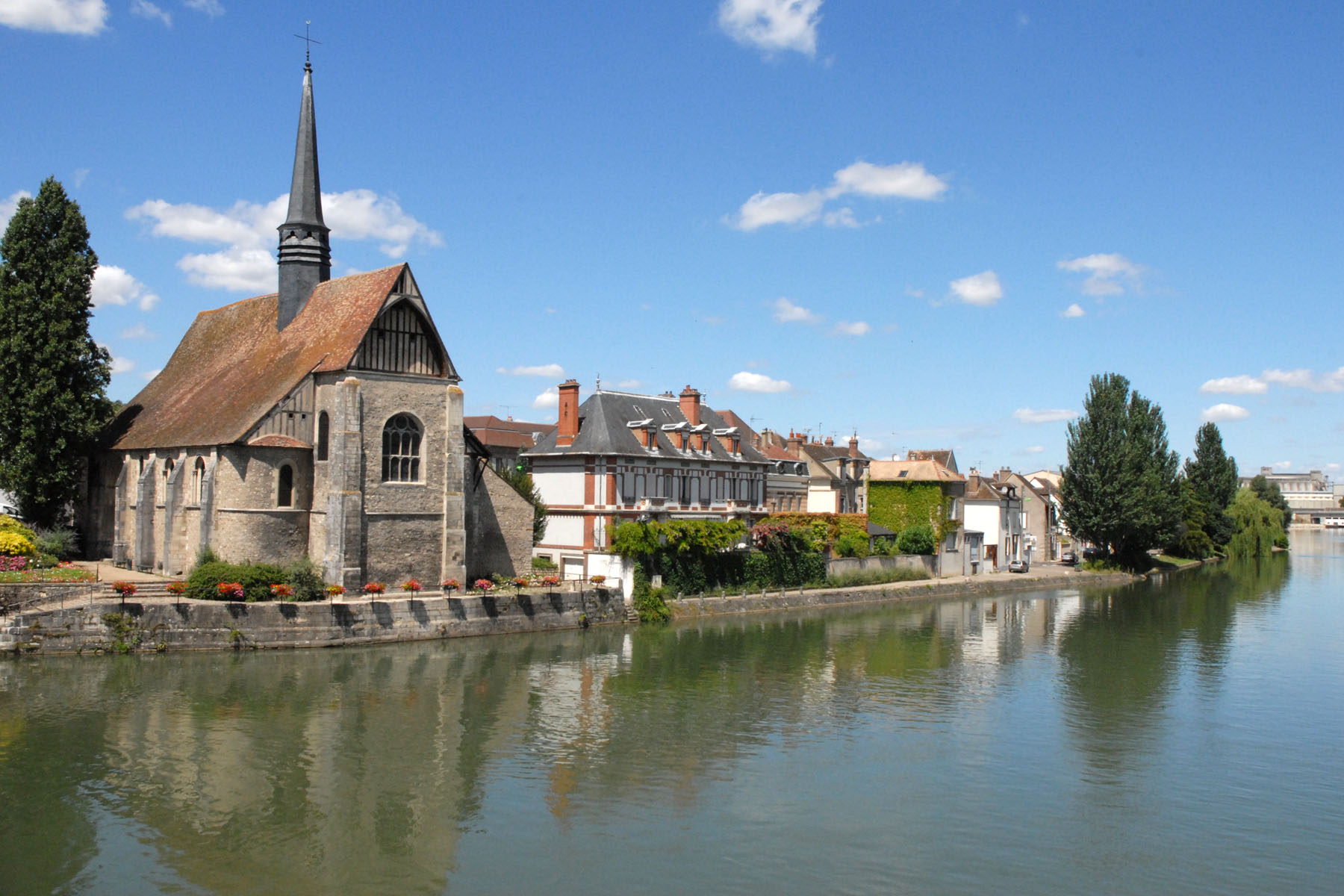
Sens on the Yonne river

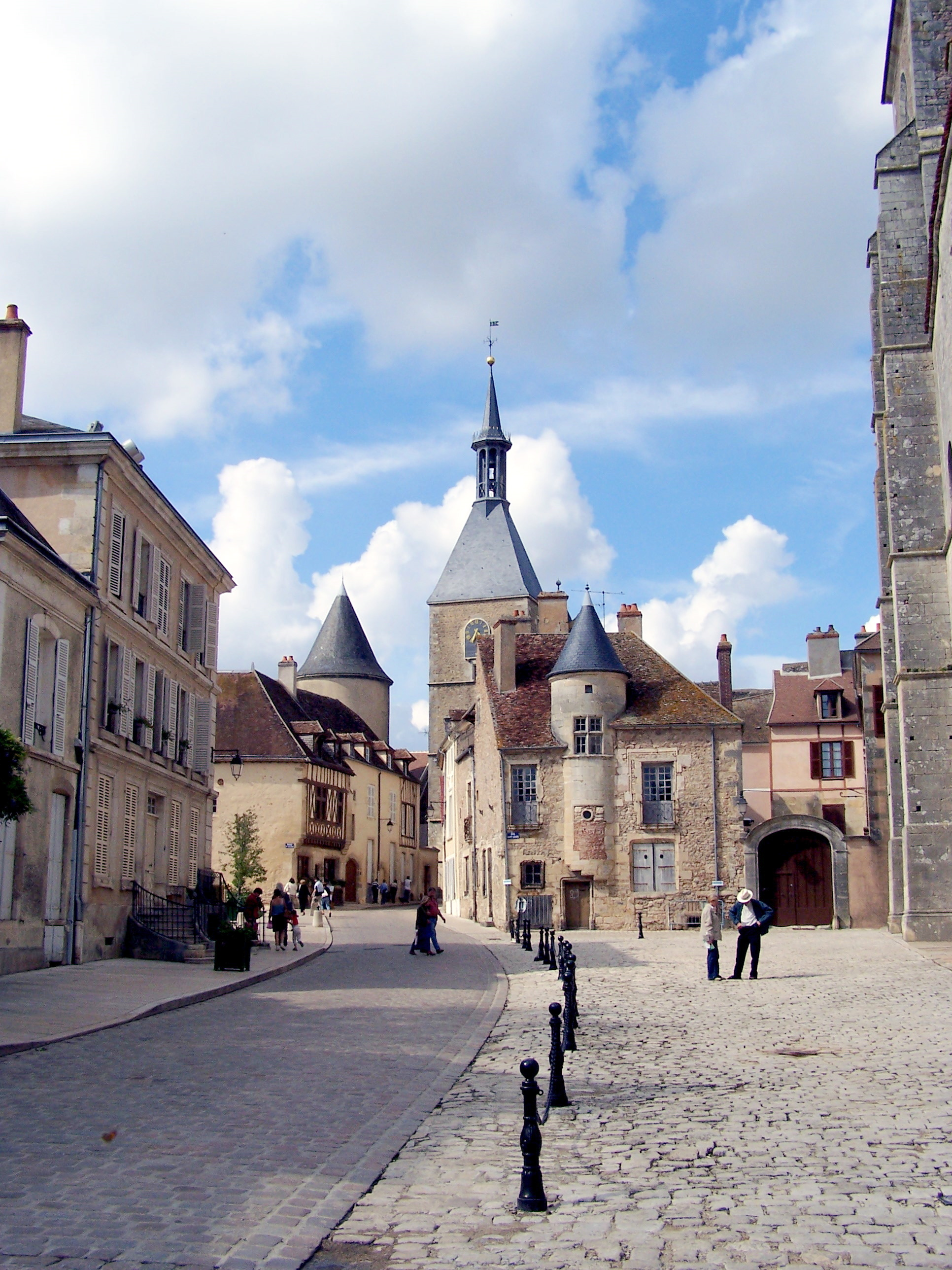
Avallon

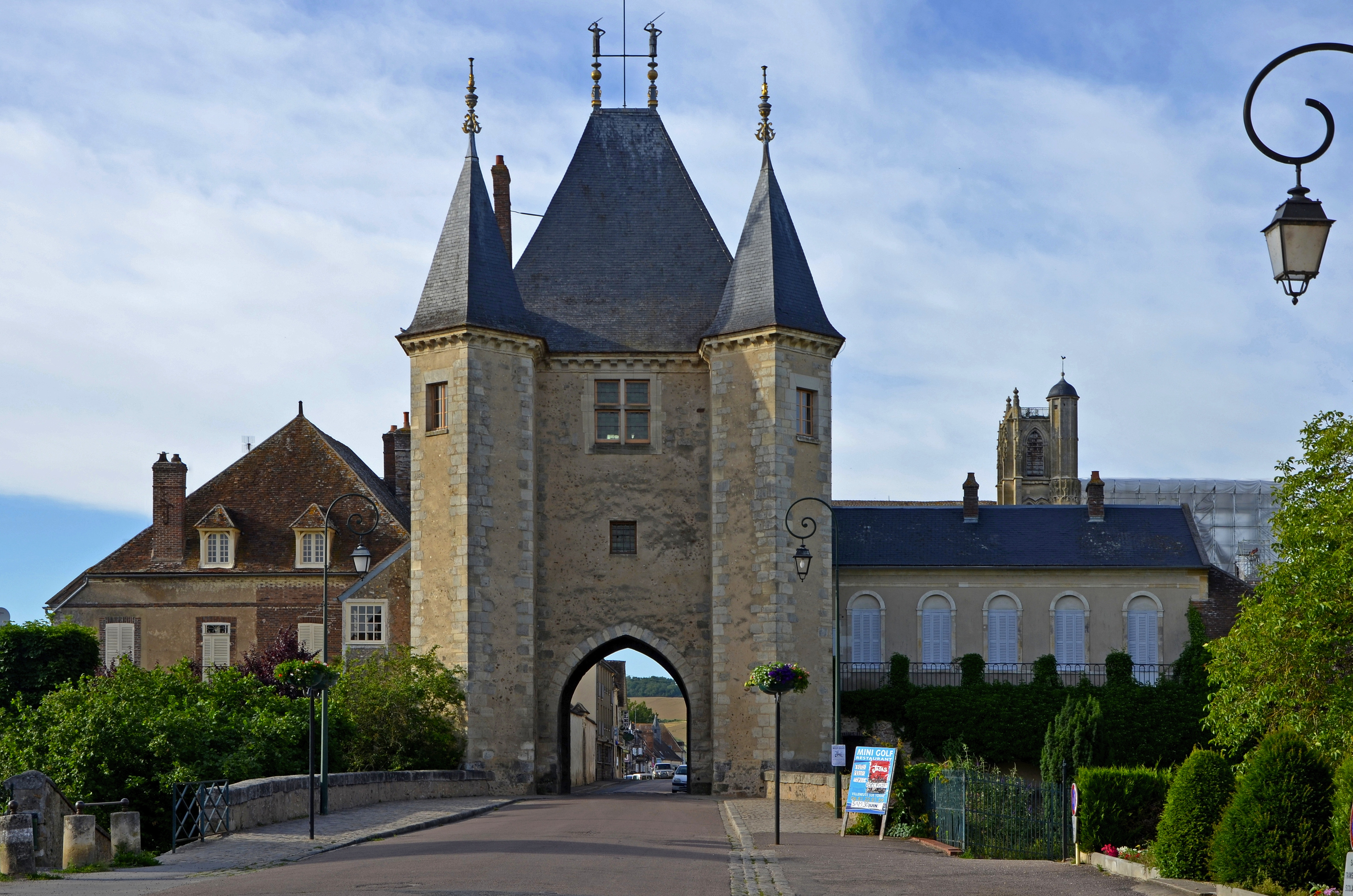
Villeneuve-sur-Yonne

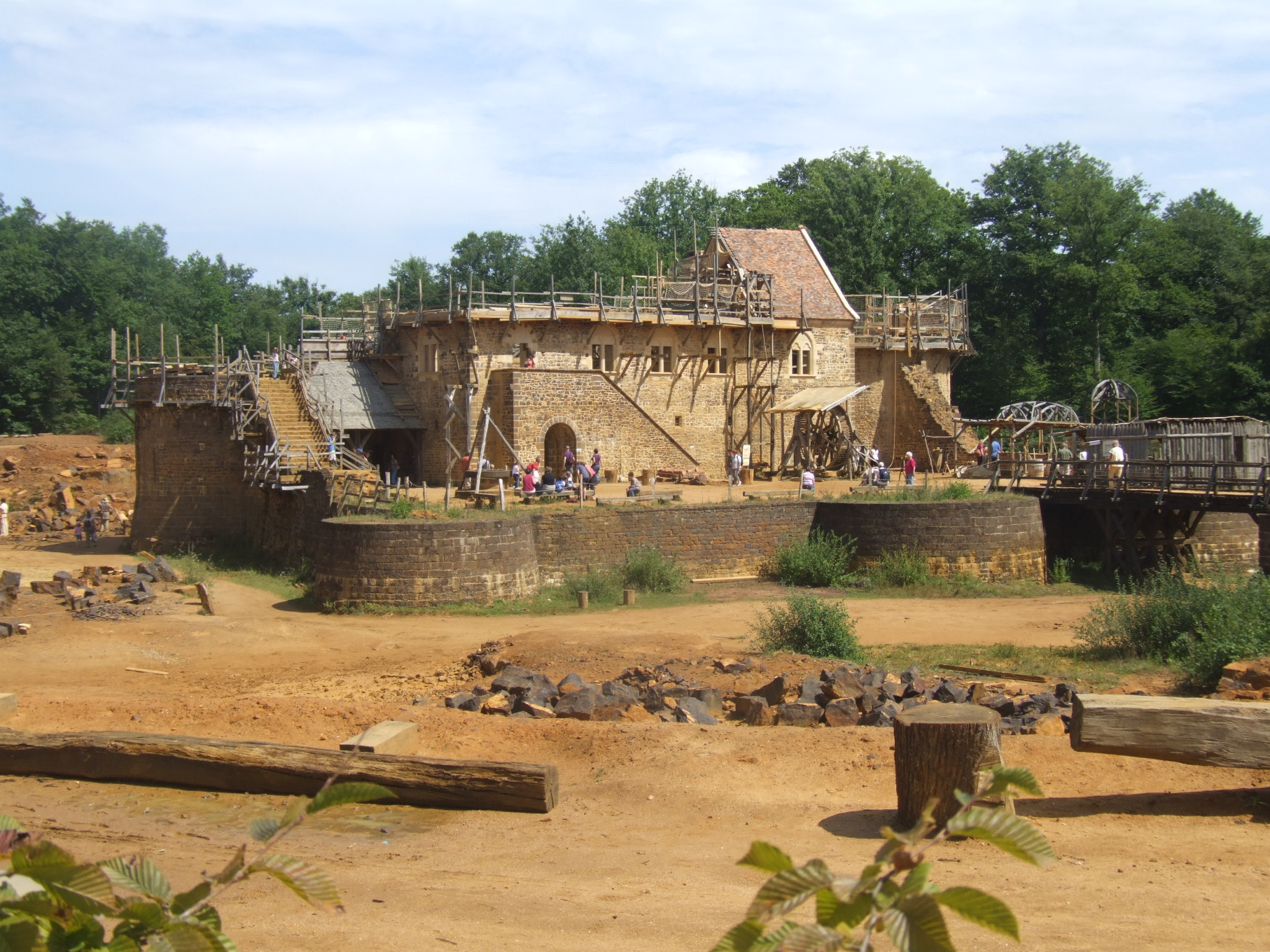
The medieval construction project of Guédelon Castle as of 2009

== See also ==
- Cantons of the Yonne department
- Communes of the Yonne department
- Arrondissements of the Yonne department
