= Jean-Baptiste Muard =

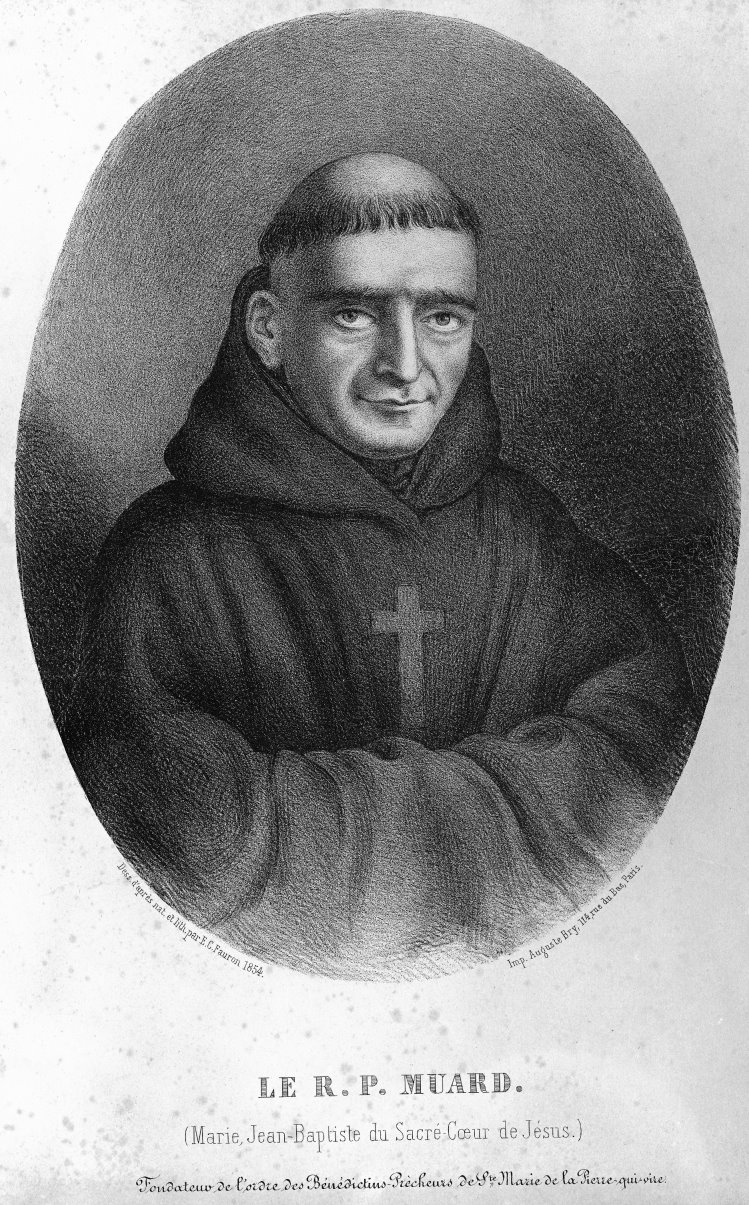
Servant of God Jean-Baptiste Muard.

Jean-Baptiste Muard, OSB (1809 – 1854) was a French Benedictine, reformer, and founder of religious orders.

== Biography ==
Jean-Baptiste Muard was born, the eldest of three sons, on April 29, 1809, in Vireaux to Claude and Catherine Paillot Muard. As a boy he was mentored by the local curé of Pacy-sur-Armançon, M. Rolley, who sponsored him at the Petit Séminaire of Auxerre, which he entered in September 1823. During vacations, Muard and some of his schoolmates would make a pilgrimage on foot to a shrine of Sainte Reine not far from Vireaux. He completed his studies, but the July Revolution of 1830 caused the seminary to close early and the students returned home.

That October Muard entered the Grand Séminaire at Sens and was saddened to discover that, due to the political turmoil, a number of his classmates had reconsidered the advisability of a clerical career at that time. He received the diaconate on December 21, 1833, and was ordained on May 4, 1834. After a month's visit home, during which he assisted Abbé Rolley, he was appointed curé of Joux-la-Ville. In addition to his pastoral duties, he also began to give instruction to some of the boys, just as Abbé Rolley had taught him.

Although Muard wished to apply for the Foreign Missions, he was then posted to the Church of St. Martin in Avallon to fill a vacancy due to the death of the resident curé. As a favor to a neighboring pastor, he preached a mission in Pontaubert during Advent 1839. It proved so successful that he began to focus on the potential for Diocesan Missions. Convinced that he should pursue this new direction, he and Abbé Bravard, an associate from Sens Cathedral, with the permission of the bishop, commenced a novitiate with the Marist Fathers at Lyon. However, during his time there Muard had occasion to visit John Vianney, the revered Curé d'Ars, who advised him not to join the Marists, but to return to his diocese and conduct diocesan missions. From there, in June 1841, he made a pilgrimage to Rome and to seek the approval of Pope Gregory XVI.

He founded the French province of the Cassinese Congregation of the Primitive Observance and the Society of Saint Edmund in 1843. In 1850, Jean-Baptiste Muard founded the Abbey of la Pierre-qui-Vire in the Morvan.

== Sainthood cause ==
The cause for Muard's beatification was formally opened on 11 May 1928, granting him the title of Servant of God.
