= Armançon =

River in France

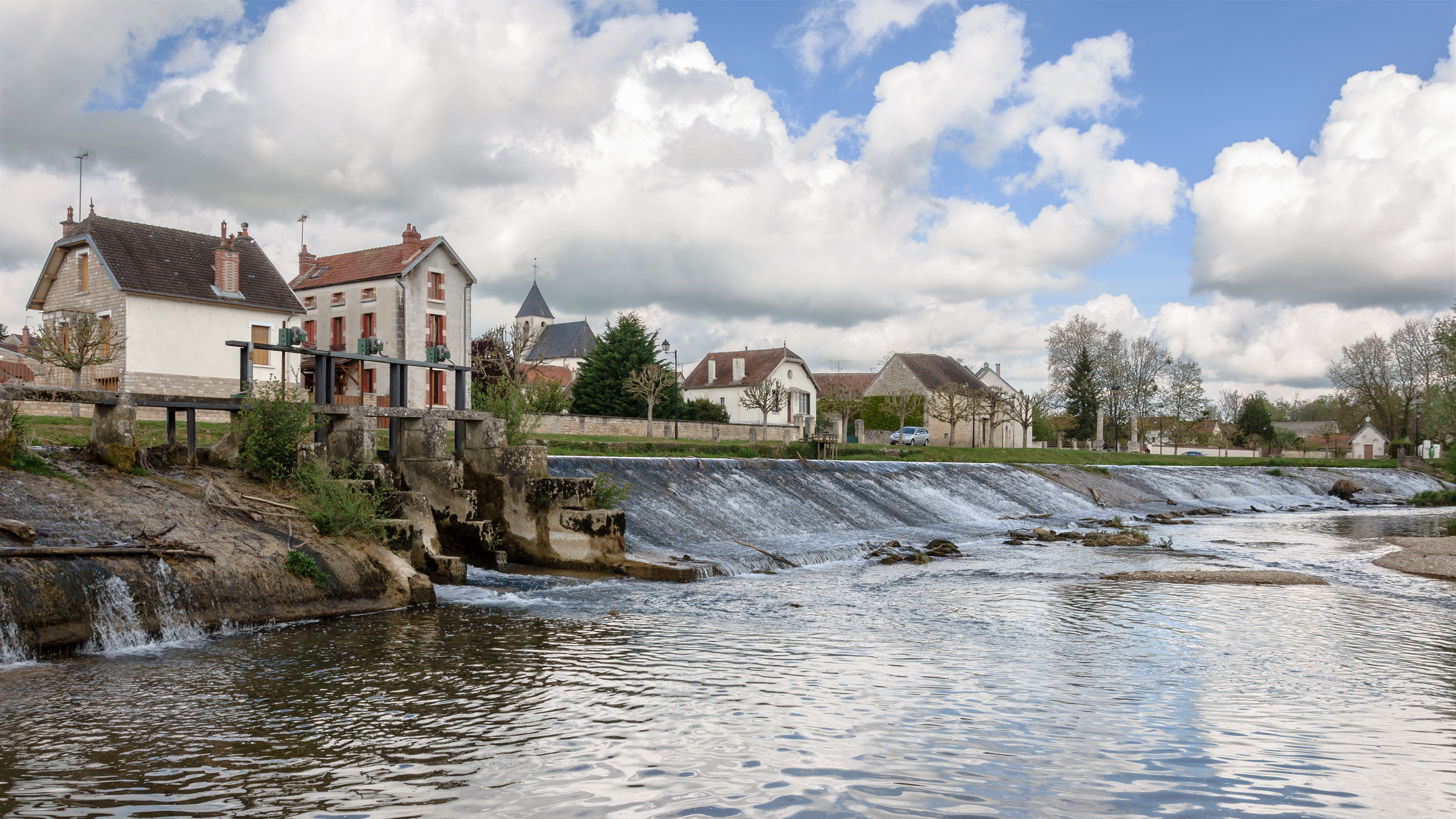
- The Armançon in Nuits

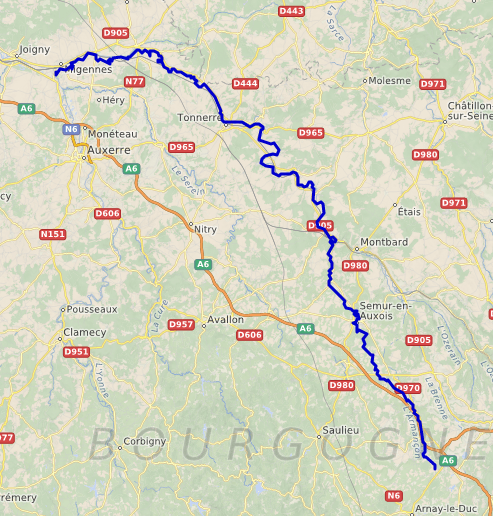

Location
- Country: France

Physical characteristics
- Source
  - location: Burgundy
  - elevation: 380 m (1,250 ft)
- Mouth
  - location: Yonne
  - coordinates: 47°57′8″N 3°30′30″E
- Length: 202 km (126 mi)
- Basin size: 2,990 km^{2} (1,150 mi^{2})
- Discharge
  - average: 30 m^{3}/s (1,100 cu ft/s)

Basin features
- Progression: Yonne→ Seine→ English Channel

The river Armançon (French pronunciation: [aʁmɑ̃sɔ̃]) drains part of north-western Burgundy in France. It is 202 km (126 mi) long. It rises at Meilly-sur-Rouvres in the department of Côte-d'Or and flows into the Yonne (right bank) at Migennes. Its source is at about 380 m (1,250 ft) above sea level and it enters the Yonne at 79 m (259 ft).

== Course ==
The Armançon rises 2 km (1.2 mi) north-west of Meilly-sur-Rouvres in the district known as the Auxois, on the lip of the saucer represented by the Paris Basin. It flows down the western, dip slope of the Côte d'Or and on the margin of the Morvan. Its source is on the Lower Jurassic rocks where they and the Upper Triassic are much influenced by the granites and volcanism of the Morvan, a northward extension of the Massif Central.

The river's upper valley is used by the Canal de Bourgogne and the Autoroute A6 but the two diverge and the river passes between them, alone towards the small town of Semur-en-Auxois. In this part of its course the river has cut its valley down through the Jurassic rocks to the underlying granite. The Cernant joins just below Semur.

Near Buffon, north-west of Montbard, the canal joins it again from the Brenne valley accompanied by the Dijon to Paris (Gare de l'Est) railway. The Bornant enters from the left slightly lower. They all pass through forested country on Middle Jurassic geology. Shortly after, they pass into the department of Yonne. Near the border between the departments and just below Ravières, the river passes onto the Upper Jurassic where the valley bottom has accumulated Holocene alluvium. However, the Upper Jurassic rocks are available to supply the clay element of the materials for the cement works which lie between the river and the canal between Pacy-sur-Armançon and Lézinnes. Still in forested country, it passes the small town of Tonnerre and passes very briefly through the department of Aube as it flows onto the lower Cretaceous rocks, clothed in less woodland.

Just below Saint-Florentin it is crossed by the TGV railway from Paris to Lyon and Avignon. The river arrives on the Middle Cretaceous as the Créanton joins from the right, just before the river and the Canal de Bourgogne enter the Yonne at Migennes. The town is backed by the relatively treeless Upper Cretaceous chalk.

The Lower Cretaceous is comparable with the rocks of the Weald of southern England and the Upper Jurassic with the Oxford Clay and associated strata of the English Midlands. The middle Jurassic rocks contain more limestones. The Upper Cretaceous is mainly chalk

== Tributaries ==
Its principal tributaries are:

- the Rû de Bierre (right bank)
- the Ruisseau de Bornant (left bank)
- the Cernant (left bank)
- the Brenne (right bank)
- the Bornant (left bank)
- the Brionne (right bank)
- the Ruisseau de Cléon (left bank)
- the Armance (right bank)
- the Créanton (right bank)
- the Ruisseau de Larry (left bank)
- the Prée (right bank)
- the Ruisseau de Thorey (left bank)

Ru is an old or literary word for "brook". Ruisseau is usually translated as stream. It can mean "gutter".
