= Saint-Léger-Vauban =

- Commune
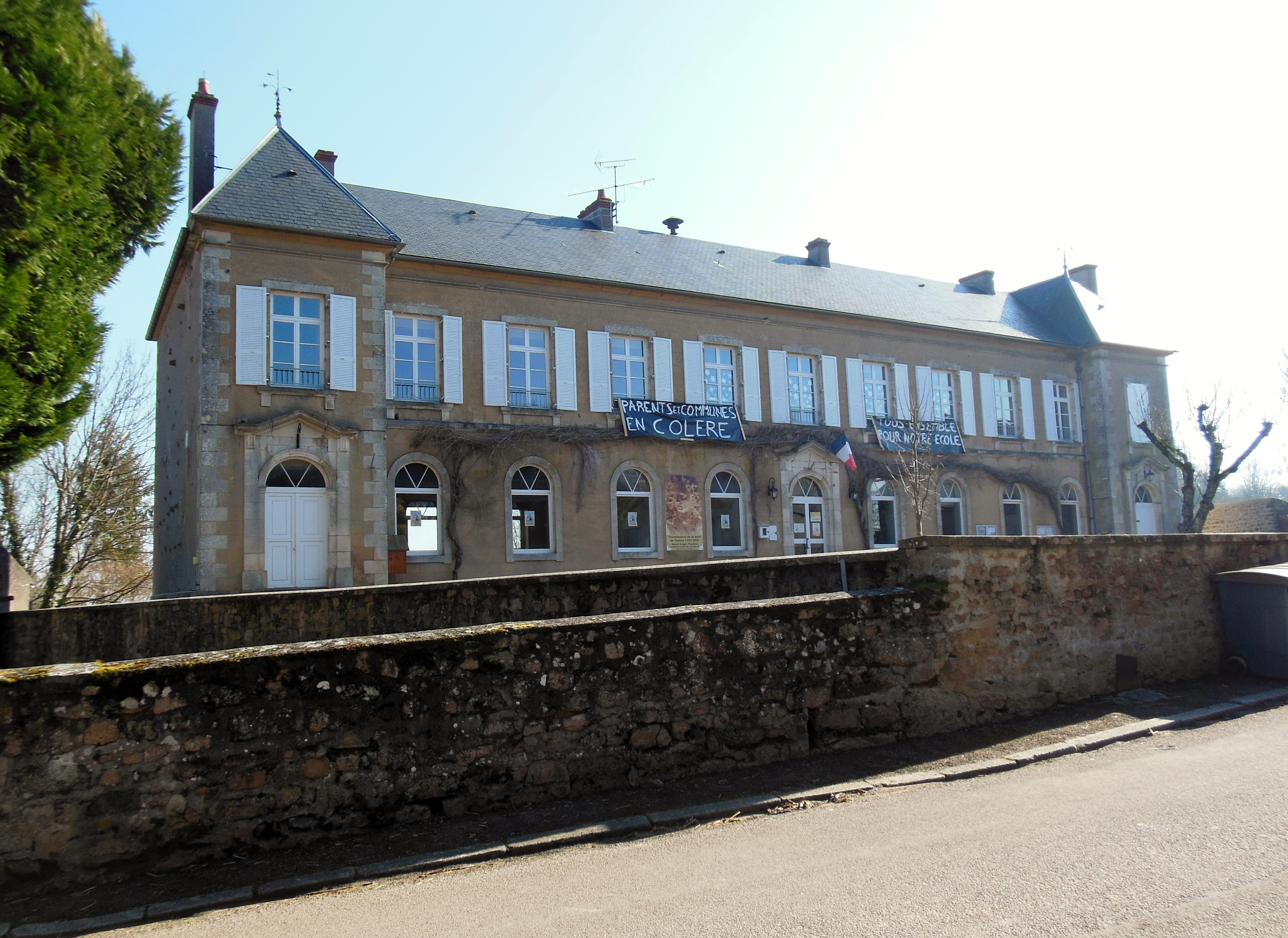
- The town hall in Saint-Léger-Vauban

- Coat of arms
- Location of Saint-Léger-Vauban
- Location within France Location within Bourgogne-Franche-Comté
- Coordinates: 47°23′16″N 4°02′30″E
- Country: France
- Region: Bourgogne-Franche-Comté
- Department: Yonne
- Arrondissement: Avallon
- Canton: Avallon

Government
  - Mayor (2020–2026): Damien Brizard
- Area^{1}: 33.81 km^{2} (13.05 sq mi)
- Elevation: 447 m (1,467 ft)
- Highest elevation: 566 m (1,857 ft)
- Lowest elevation: 325 m (1,066 ft)
- Population (2023): 356
  - Density: 10.5/km^{2} (27.3/sq mi)
- Time zone: UTC+01:00 (CET)
  - Summer (DST): UTC+02:00 (CEST)
- INSEE/Postal code: 89349 /89630
- ^{1} French Land Register data, which excludes lakes, ponds, glaciers > 1 km^{2} (0.386 sq mi or 247 acres) and river estuaries.

Saint-Léger-Vauban (French pronunciation: [sɛ̃ leʒe vobɑ̃]) is a commune in the Yonne department in Bourgogne-Franche-Comté in north-central France.

It lies within the Parc naturel régional du Morvan.

== Geography ==
The town is situated between Rouvray and Quarré-les-Tombes. The nearest large town is Avallon.

== History ==
The town was originally named Saint Leger, then Saint-Léger-de-Fourcheret until 1867, when Napoleon III issued an Imperial decree renaming it Saint-Léger-de-Vauban, after the French military engineer Vauban, who was born there in 1633.

== Culture ==
The village has a small museum dedicated to Vauban. Since 2021, a baroque and classical music festival has been held there on July

== Sights ==
The church was restored in 1865 and has a functional bell tower. Saint-Léger-Vauban is also home to the Abbey of la Pierre-qui-Vire and the Château de Rueres.

== Economy ==
Saint-Léger's primary economic activity is farming, though there are several small shops, a post office, school, and multiple cheese makers.

== See also ==
- List of places named after people
- Communes of the Yonne department
