= Girolles =

Girolles may refer to:

- Girolles, Loiret, a commune in the French region of Centre
- Girolles, Yonne, a commune in the French region of Bourgogne

== See also ==
- Cantharellus cibarius fungus
- Girolle, a type of cheese knife
