= Arrondissement of Avallon =

Coordinates: 47°29′27″N 3°54′33″E

Avallon
- Arrondissement
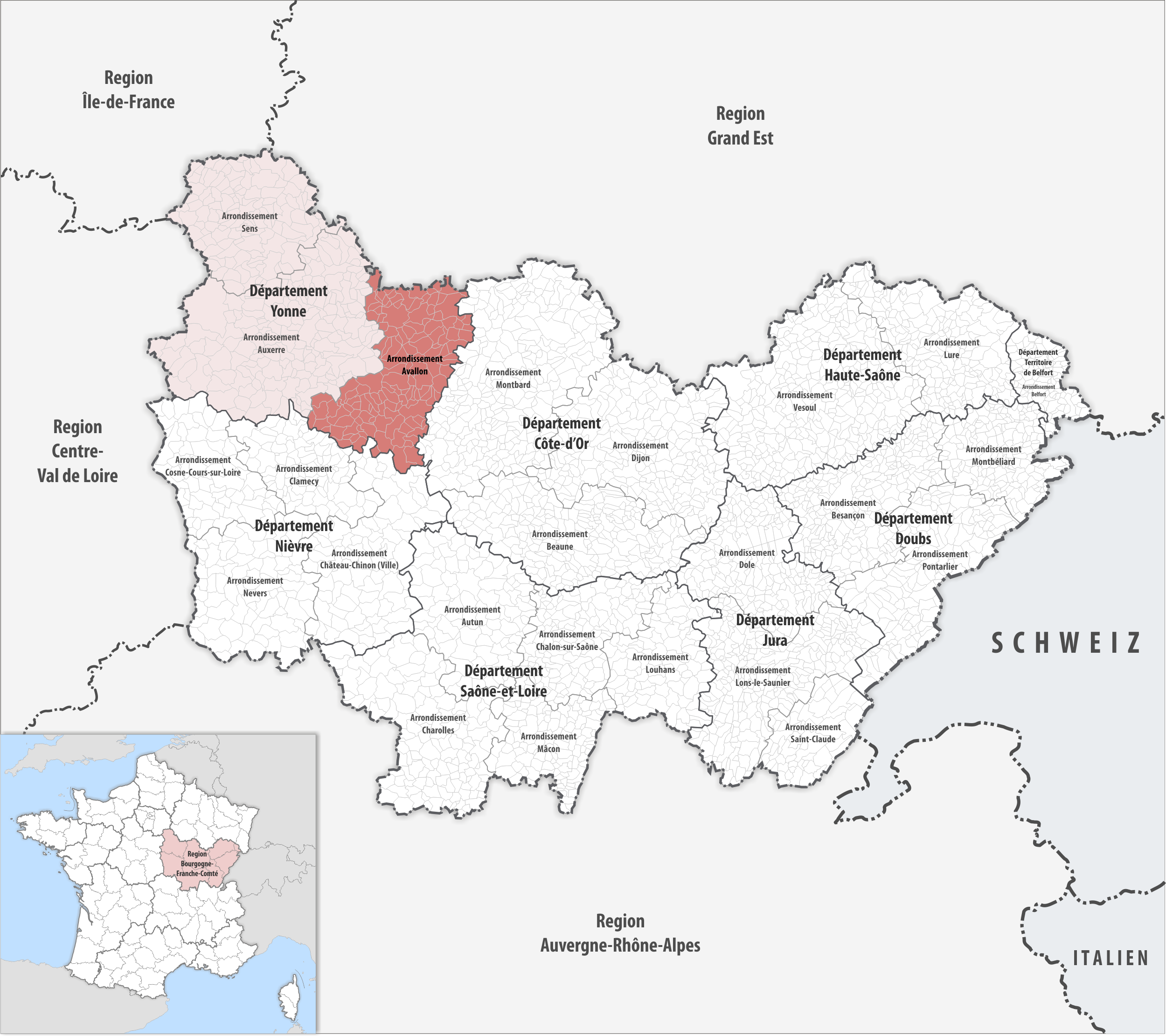
- Location within the region Bourgogne-Franche-Comté
- Country: France
- Region: Bourgogne-Franche-Comté
- Department: Yonne
- No. of communes: {{{nbcomm}}}
- Area: 2,078.8 km^{2} (802.6 sq mi)
- Population (2023): 40,498
  - Density: 19.481/km^{2} (50.457/sq mi)
- INSEE code: 892

The arrondissement of Avallon is an arrondissement of France in the Yonne department in the Bourgogne-Franche-Comté region. It has 135 communes. Its population is 40,732 (2021), and its area is 2,078.8 km^{2} (802.6 sq mi).

== Composition ==
The communes of the arrondissement of Avallon, and their INSEE codes, are:

1. Aisy-sur-Armançon (89004)
2. Ancy-le-Franc (89005)
3. Ancy-le-Libre (89006)
4. Angely (89008)
5. Annay-la-Côte (89009)
6. Annay-sur-Serein (89010)
7. Annéot (89011)
8. Annoux (89012)
9. Arcy-sur-Cure (89015)
10. Argentenay (89016)
11. Argenteuil-sur-Armançon (89017)
12. Arthonnay (89019)
13. Asnières-sous-Bois (89020)
14. Asquins (89021)
15. Athie (89022)
16. Avallon (89025)
17. Baon (89028)
18. Beauvilliers (89032)
19. Bernouil (89038)
20. Bierry-les-Belles-Fontaines (89042)
21. Blacy (89043)
22. Blannay (89044)
23. Bois-d'Arcy (89049)
24. Brosses (89057)
25. Bussières (89058)
26. Censy (89064)
27. Chamoux (89071)
28. Chassignelles (89087)
29. Chastellux-sur-Cure (89089)
30. Châtel-Censoir (89091)
31. Châtel-Gérard (89092)
32. Cheney (89098)
33. Collan (89112)
34. Coutarnoux (89128)
35. Cruzy-le-Châtel (89131)
36. Cry (89132)
37. Cussy-les-Forges (89134)
38. Dannemoine (89137)
39. Dissangis (89141)
40. Domecy-sur-Cure (89145)
41. Domecy-sur-le-Vault (89146)
42. Dyé (89149)
43. Épineuil (89153)
44. Étaule (89159)
45. Étivey (89161)
46. Flogny-la-Chapelle (89169)
47. Foissy-lès-Vézelay (89170)
48. Fontenay-près-Vézelay (89176)
49. Fresnes (89183)
50. Fulvy (89184)
51. Gigny (89187)
52. Girolles (89188)
53. Givry (89190)
54. Gland (89191)
55. Grimault (89194)
56. Guillon-Terre-Plaine (89197)
57. Island (89203)
58. L'Isle-sur-Serein (89204)
59. Jouancy (89207)
60. Joux-la-Ville (89208)
61. Jully (89210)
62. Junay (89211)
63. Lézinnes (89223)
64. Lichères-sur-Yonne (89225)
65. Lucy-le-Bois (89232)
66. Magny (89235)
67. Marmeaux (89244)
68. Massangis (89246)
69. Mélisey (89247)
70. Menades (89248)
71. Merry-sur-Yonne (89253)
72. Môlay (89259)
73. Molosmes (89262)
74. Montillot (89266)
75. Montréal (89267)
76. Moulins-en-Tonnerrois (89271)
77. Noyers (89279)
78. Nuits (89280)
79. Pacy-sur-Armançon (89284)
80. Pasilly (89290)
81. Perrigny-sur-Armançon (89296)
82. Pierre-Perthuis (89297)
83. Pimelles (89299)
84. Pisy (89300)
85. Pontaubert (89306)
86. Précy-le-Sec (89312)
87. Provency (89316)
88. Quarré-les-Tombes (89318)
89. Quincerot (89320)
90. Ravières (89321)
91. Roffey (89323)
92. Rugny (89329)
93. Saint-André-en-Terre-Plaine (89333)
94. Saint-Brancher (89336)
95. Sainte-Colombe (89339)
96. Sainte-Magnance (89351)
97. Sainte-Vertu (89371)
98. Saint-Germain-des-Champs (89347)
99. Saint-Léger-Vauban (89349)
100. Saint-Martin-sur-Armançon (89355)
101. Saint-Moré (89362)
102. Saint-Père (89364)
103. Sambourg (89374)
104. Santigny (89375)
105. Sarry (89376)
106. Sauvigny-le-Beuréal (89377)
107. Sauvigny-le-Bois (89378)
108. Savigny-en-Terre-Plaine (89379)
109. Sennevoy-le-Bas (89385)
110. Sennevoy-le-Haut (89386)
111. Sermizelles (89392)
112. Serrigny (89393)
113. Stigny (89403)
114. Talcy (89406)
115. Tanlay (89407)
116. Tharoiseau (89409)
117. Tharot (89410)
118. Thizy (89412)
119. Thorey (89413)
120. Thory (89415)
121. Tissey (89417)
122. Tonnerre (89418)
123. Trichey (89422)
124. Tronchoy (89423)
125. Vassy-sous-Pisy (89431)
126. Vault-de-Lugny (89433)
127. Vézannes (89445)
128. Vézelay (89446)
129. Vézinnes (89447)
130. Villiers-les-Hauts (89470)
131. Villon (89475)
132. Vireaux (89481)
133. Viviers (89482)
134. Voutenay-sur-Cure (89485)
135. Yrouerre (89486)

== History ==
The arrondissement of Avallon was created in 1800. At the January 2017 reorganisation of the arrondissements of Yonne, it received 12 communes from the arrondissement of Auxerre, and it lost 13 communes to the arrondissement of Auxerre.

As a result of the reorganisation of the cantons of France which came into effect in 2015, the borders of the cantons are no longer related to the borders of the arrondissements. The cantons of the arrondissement of Avallon were, as of January 2015:

1. Ancy-le-Franc
2. Avallon
3. Cruzy-le-Châtel
4. Flogny-la-Chapelle
5. Guillon
6. L'Isle-sur-Serein
7. Noyers
8. Quarré-les-Tombes
9. Tonnerre
10. Vézelay
