= Domecy-sur-le-Vault =

- Commune
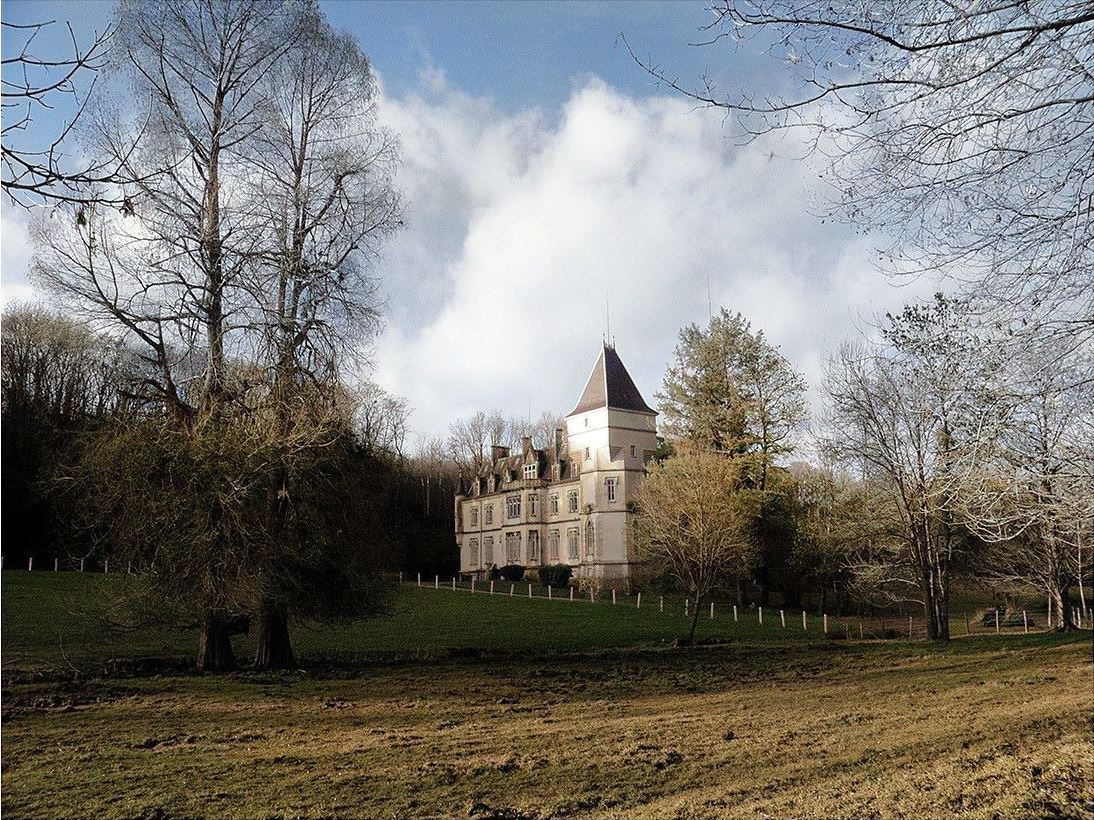
- The chateau in Domecy-sur-le-Vault (2009)
- Location of Domecy-sur-le-Vault
- Location within France Location within Bourgogne-Franche-Comté
- Coordinates: 47°29′31″N 3°48′37″E
- Country: France
- Region: Bourgogne-Franche-Comté
- Department: Yonne
- Arrondissement: Avallon
- Canton: Avallon

Government
  - Mayor (2020–2026): Éric Stéphan
- Area^{1}: 6.21 km^{2} (2.40 sq mi)
- Highest elevation: 346 m (1,135 ft)
- Lowest elevation: 167 m (548 ft)
- Population (2023): 83
  - Density: 13/km^{2} (35/sq mi)
- Time zone: UTC+01:00 (CET)
  - Summer (DST): UTC+02:00 (CEST)
- INSEE/Postal code: 89146 /89200
- ^{1} French Land Register data, which excludes lakes, ponds, glaciers > 1 km^{2} (0.386 sq mi or 247 acres) and river estuaries.

Domecy-sur-le-Vault (French pronunciation: [dɔmsi syʁ lə vo], literally Domecy on the Vault) is a commune in the Yonne department in Bourgogne-Franche-Comté in north-central France.

The commune is known for the Château de Domecy-sur-le-Vault.

== See also ==
- Communes of the Yonne department
