= Cussy-les-Forges =

- Commune
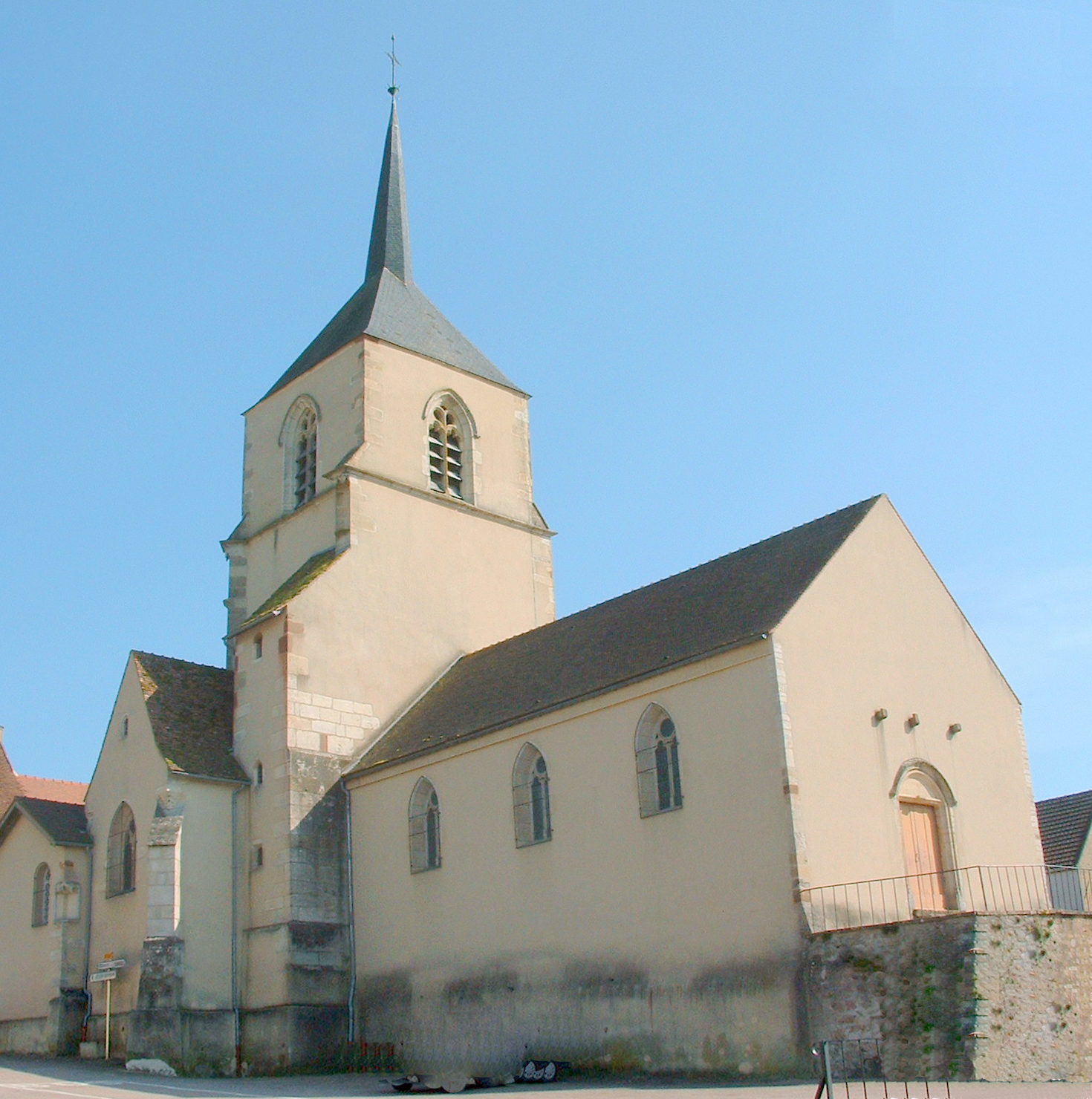
- The church in Cussy-les-Forges
- Location of Cussy-les-Forges
- Location within France Location within Bourgogne-Franche-Comté
- Coordinates: 47°28′15″N 4°01′38″E
- Country: France
- Region: Bourgogne-Franche-Comté
- Department: Yonne
- Arrondissement: Avallon
- Canton: Avallon

Government
  - Mayor (2020–2026): Angelo Arena
- Area^{1}: 13.62 km^{2} (5.26 sq mi)
- Highest elevation: 361 m (1,184 ft)
- Lowest elevation: 265 m (869 ft)
- Population (2023): 322
  - Density: 23.6/km^{2} (61.2/sq mi)
- Time zone: UTC+01:00 (CET)
  - Summer (DST): UTC+02:00 (CEST)
- INSEE/Postal code: 89134 /89420
- ^{1} French Land Register data, which excludes lakes, ponds, glaciers > 1 km^{2} (0.386 sq mi or 247 acres) and river estuaries.

Cussy-les-Forges (French pronunciation: [kysi le fɔʁʒ]) is a commune in the Yonne department in Bourgogne-Franche-Comté in north-central France.

== See also ==
- Communes of the Yonne department
- Yonne (river)
