= Sainte-Magnance =

- Commune
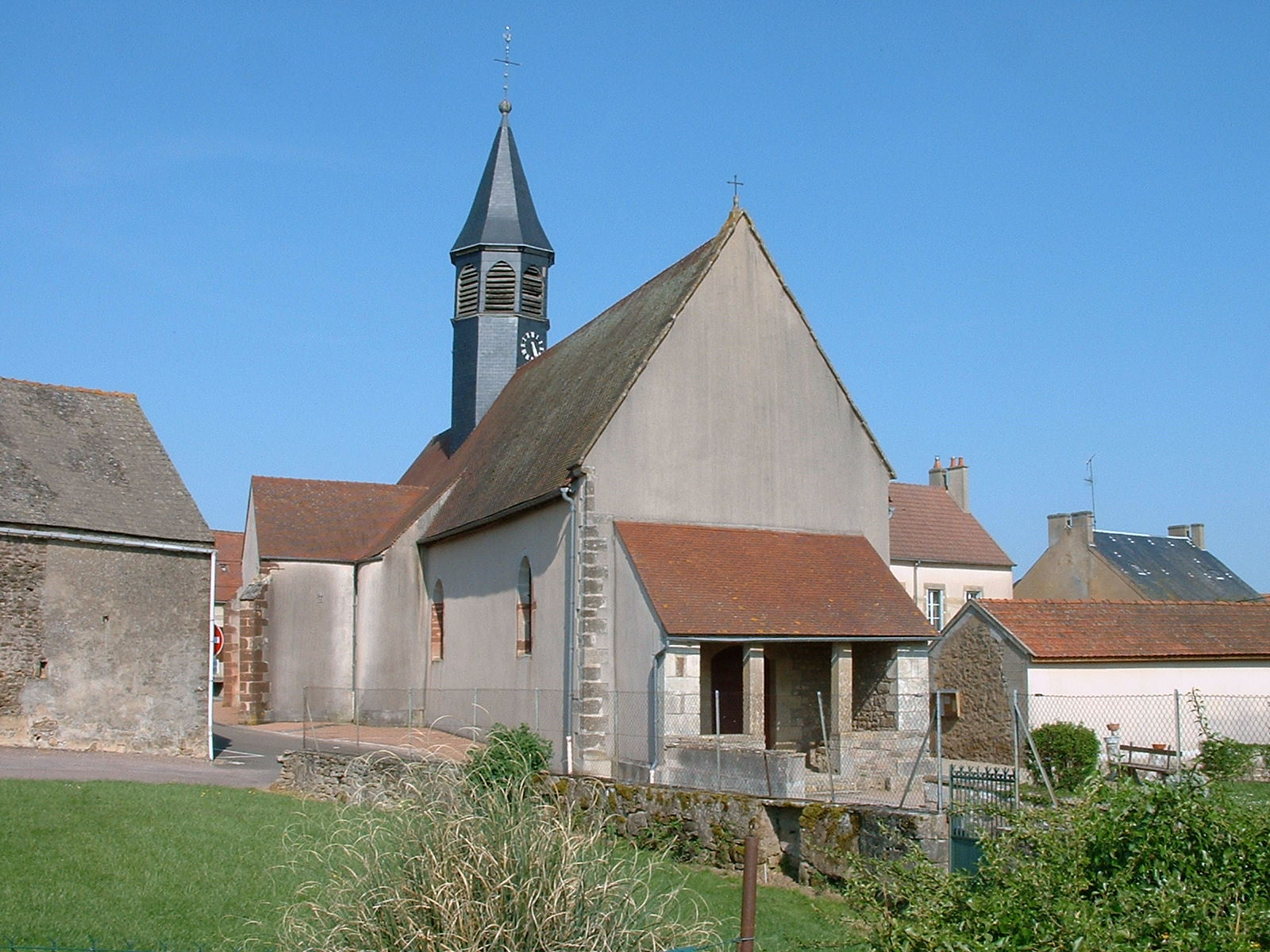
- The church in Sainte-Magnance
- Location of Sainte-Magnance
- Location within France Location within Bourgogne-Franche-Comté
- Coordinates: 47°27′04″N 4°04′43″E
- Country: France
- Region: Bourgogne-Franche-Comté
- Department: Yonne
- Arrondissement: Avallon
- Canton: Avallon

Government
  - Mayor (2024–2026): Charles Baron
- Area^{1}: 19.37 km^{2} (7.48 sq mi)
- Highest elevation: 379 m (1,243 ft)
- Lowest elevation: 230 m (750 ft)
- Population (2023): 477
  - Density: 24.6/km^{2} (63.8/sq mi)
- Time zone: UTC+01:00 (CET)
  - Summer (DST): UTC+02:00 (CEST)
- INSEE/Postal code: 89351 /89420
- ^{1} French Land Register data, which excludes lakes, ponds, glaciers > 1 km^{2} (0.386 sq mi or 247 acres) and river estuaries.

Sainte-Magnance (French pronunciation: [sɛ̃t maɲɑ̃s]) is a commune in the Yonne department in Bourgogne-Franche-Comté in north-central France.

== History ==
The village was originally named Saint-Pierre-sous-Cordois.

In 448 bishop Germanus of Auxerre (380 - 448) died in Ravenna on the Adriatic coast. Magnance, a young woman from Ravenna accompanied his remains back to Auxerre, but she died on the way near the Saint-Pierre-sous-Cordois village, in November 448. Her travelling companions buried her there. Then she was forgotten, until the 7th century when a pilgrim came to rest at the same spot, laying his head on a horse's skull. During his sleep he dreamed of Magnance protecting him from a snake. Upon awakening he found that there was a snake in the horse's skull. He told the story at the village. The inhabitants went and found Magnance's body, brought it back to the village, buried her in the church and renamed their village "Sainte-Magnance" in her honour. Her tomb is still in the village church.
In the 11th century a chapel was erected on the spot where she had died; it was destroyed during the 18th century. In the 2000s (decade), a woman from the village made a donation to the village in her will, in order for a statue to be erected where the chapel had once stood. This was done in 2009. Her story is told on a sign accompanying the statue, which stands on the edge of a wood, on the side of the D906 road between Sainte-Magnance (Yonne) and Rouvray (Côte-d'Or). The D906 at this place is the limit between the two departments; the statue is in the Côte-d'Or side of the road but is very much linked with the Yonne village of Sainte-Magnance.
There is easy parking nearby, and a plunging view from that spot onto Sainte-Magnance village at the bottom of the straight stretch of the old Roman road which is now the D906.

== Environment ==
Sainte-Magnance stands within the Morvan Regional Natural Park.

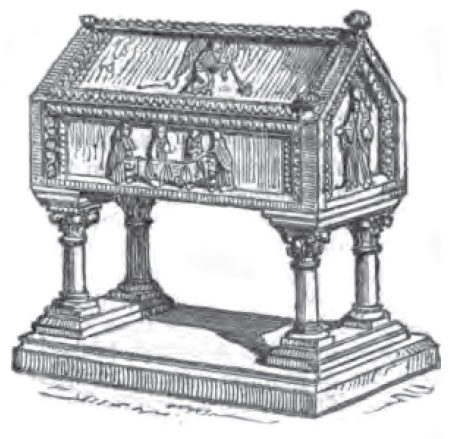
Magnance tomb, Victor Petit, 1870

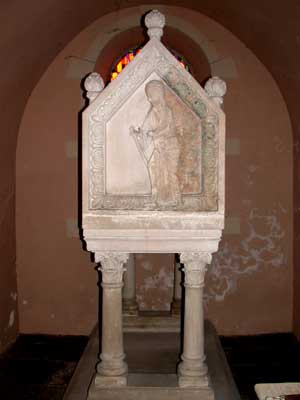
Magnance tomb

== See also ==
- Communes of the Yonne department
