= Tharot =

- Commune
- Location of Tharot
- Location within France Location within Bourgogne-Franche-Comté
- Coordinates: 47°31′43″N 3°51′36″E
- Country: France
- Region: Bourgogne-Franche-Comté
- Department: Yonne
- Arrondissement: Avallon
- Canton: Avallon

Government
  - Mayor (2020–2026): Louis Vigoureux
- Area^{1}: 2.35 km^{2} (0.91 sq mi)
- Highest elevation: 321 m (1,053 ft)
- Lowest elevation: 179 m (587 ft)
- Population (2023): 113
  - Density: 48.1/km^{2} (125/sq mi)
- Time zone: UTC+01:00 (CET)
  - Summer (DST): UTC+02:00 (CEST)
- INSEE/Postal code: 89410 /89200
- ^{1} French Land Register data, which excludes lakes, ponds, glaciers > 1 km^{2} (0.386 sq mi or 247 acres) and river estuaries.

Tharot (French pronunciation: [taʁo]) is a commune in the Yonne department in Bourgogne-Franche-Comté in north-central France.

== See also ==
- Communes of the Yonne department
