= Menades =

- Commune
- Location of Menades
- Location within France Location within Bourgogne-Franche-Comté
- Coordinates: 47°26′45″N 3°49′30″E
- Country: France
- Region: Bourgogne-Franche-Comté
- Department: Yonne
- Arrondissement: Avallon
- Canton: Avallon

Government
  - Mayor (2020–2026): Jean-Paul Fillion
- Area^{1}: 5.70 km^{2} (2.20 sq mi)
- Highest elevation: 302 m (991 ft)
- Lowest elevation: 200 m (660 ft)
- Population (2023): 36
  - Density: 6.3/km^{2} (16/sq mi)
- Time zone: UTC+01:00 (CET)
  - Summer (DST): UTC+02:00 (CEST)
- INSEE/Postal code: 89248 /89450
- ^{1} French Land Register data, which excludes lakes, ponds, glaciers > 1 km^{2} (0.386 sq mi or 247 acres) and river estuaries.

Menades (French pronunciation: [mənad]) is a commune in the Yonne department in Bourgogne-Franche-Comté in north-central France.

== See also ==
- Communes of the Yonne department
