= Bussières, Yonne =

Bussières
- Commune
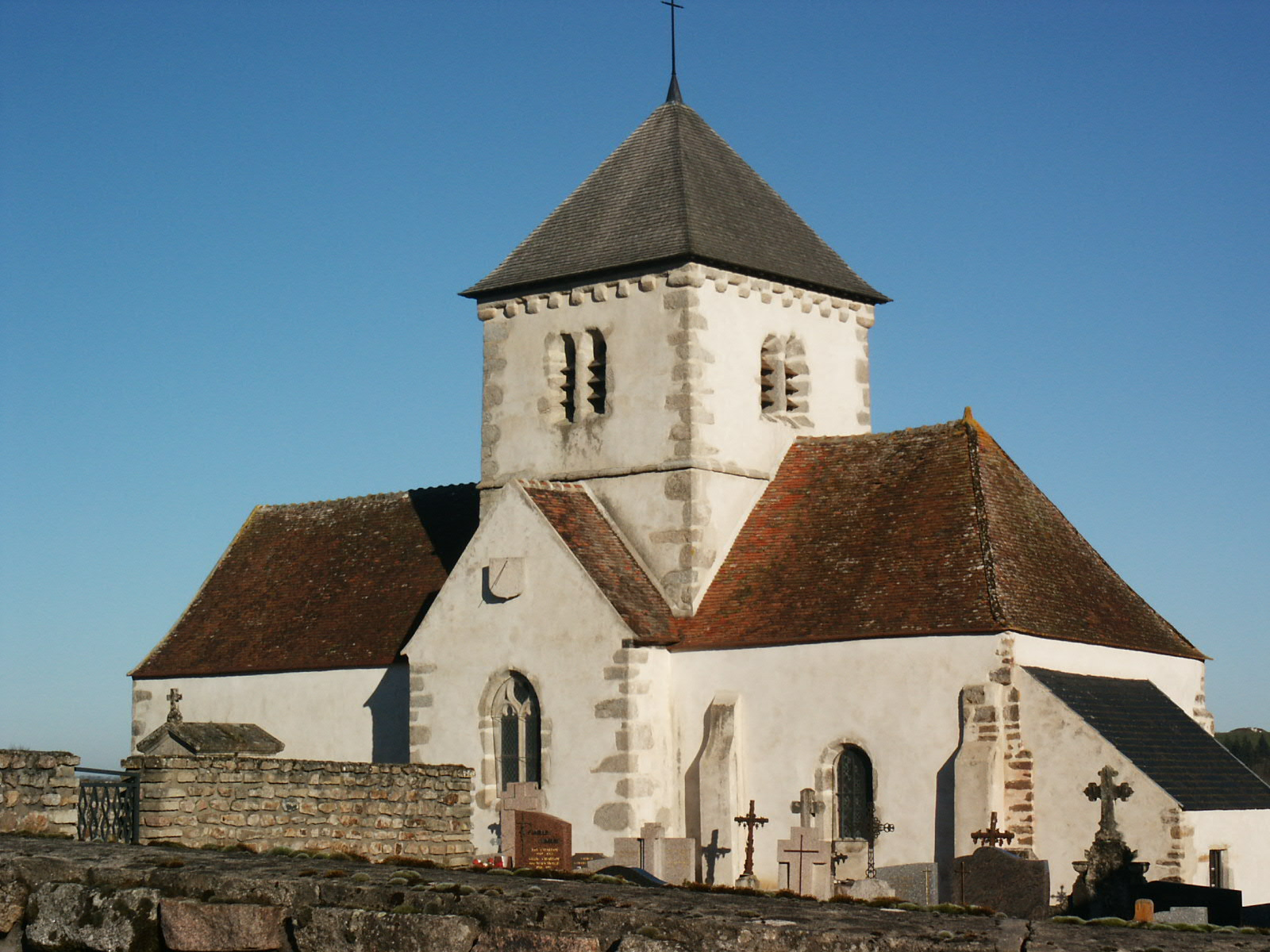
- The church in Bussières
- Location of Bussières
- Location within France Location within Bourgogne-Franche-Comté
- Coordinates: 47°25′33″N 4°03′17″E
- Country: France
- Region: Bourgogne-Franche-Comté
- Department: Yonne
- Arrondissement: Avallon
- Canton: Avallon

Government
  - Mayor (2020–2026): Nathalie Millet
- Area^{1}: 11.62 km^{2} (4.49 sq mi)
- Highest elevation: 404 m (1,325 ft)
- Lowest elevation: 287 m (942 ft)
- Population (2023): 112
  - Density: 9.64/km^{2} (25.0/sq mi)
- Time zone: UTC+01:00 (CET)
  - Summer (DST): UTC+02:00 (CEST)
- INSEE/Postal code: 89058 /89630
- ^{1} French Land Register data, which excludes lakes, ponds, glaciers > 1 km^{2} (0.386 sq mi or 247 acres) and river estuaries.

Bussières (French pronunciation: [bysjɛʁ]) is a commune in the Yonne department in Bourgogne-Franche-Comté in north-central France.

== See also ==
- Communes of the Yonne department
- Parc naturel régional du Morvan
