= Vireaux =

- Commune
- Location of Vireaux
- Location within France Location within Bourgogne-Franche-Comté
- Coordinates: 47°47′14″N 4°02′59″E
- Country: France
- Region: Bourgogne-Franche-Comté
- Department: Yonne
- Arrondissement: Avallon
- Canton: Tonnerrois

Government
  - Mayor (2020–2026): José Ponsard
- Area^{1}: 14.58 km^{2} (5.63 sq mi)
- Highest elevation: 280 m (920 ft)
- Lowest elevation: 163 m (535 ft)
- Population (2023): 97
  - Density: 6.7/km^{2} (17/sq mi)
- Time zone: UTC+01:00 (CET)
  - Summer (DST): UTC+02:00 (CEST)
- INSEE/Postal code: 89481 /89160
- ^{1} French Land Register data, which excludes lakes, ponds, glaciers > 1 km^{2} (0.386 sq mi or 247 acres) and river estuaries.

Vireaux (French pronunciation: [viʁo]) is a commune in the Yonne department in Bourgogne-Franche-Comté in north-central France.

== Notable people ==
- Jean-Baptiste Muard (1809 - 1854), French Benedictine, reformer, and founder of religious orders, was born in Vireaux.

== See also ==
- Communes of the Yonne department
