= Saint-Brancher =

- Commune
- Location of Saint-Brancher
- Location within France Location within Bourgogne-Franche-Comté
- Coordinates: 47°25′37″N 3°59′48″E
- Country: France
- Region: Bourgogne-Franche-Comté
- Department: Yonne
- Arrondissement: Avallon
- Canton: Avallon

Government
  - Mayor (2020–2026): Joëlle Guyard
- Area^{1}: 22.02 km^{2} (8.50 sq mi)
- Highest elevation: 412 m (1,352 ft)
- Lowest elevation: 251 m (823 ft)
- Population (2023): 273
  - Density: 12.4/km^{2} (32.1/sq mi)
- Time zone: UTC+01:00 (CET)
  - Summer (DST): UTC+02:00 (CEST)
- INSEE/Postal code: 89336 /89630
- ^{1} French Land Register data, which excludes lakes, ponds, glaciers > 1 km^{2} (0.386 sq mi or 247 acres) and river estuaries.

Saint-Brancher (French pronunciation: [sɛ̃ bʁɑ̃ʃe]) is a commune in the Yonne department in Bourgogne-Franche-Comté in north-central France.

== See also ==
- Communes of the Yonne department
- Parc naturel régional du Morvan
