= Island, Yonne =

Island
- Commune
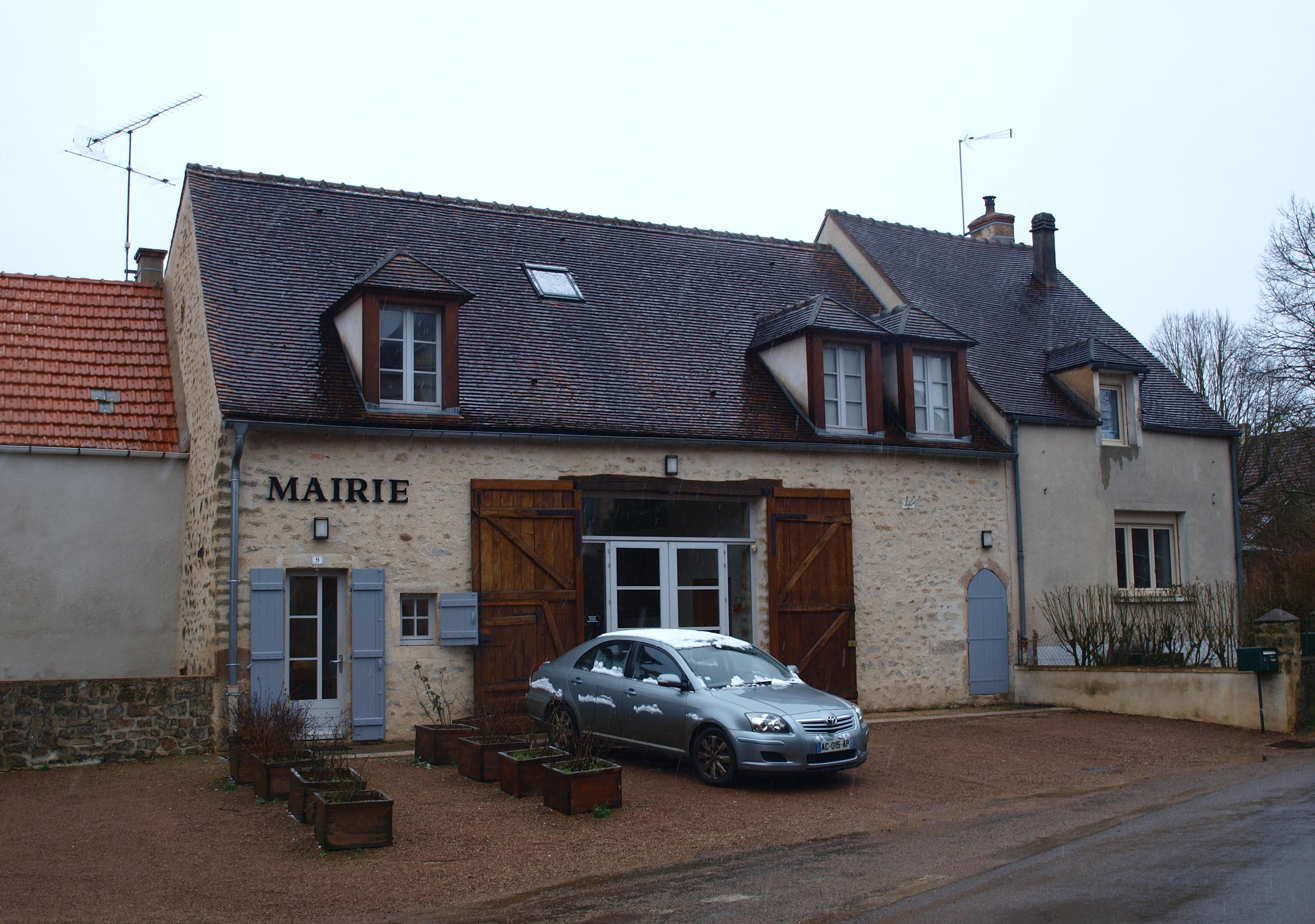
- The town hall in Island
- Location of Island
- Location within France Location within Bourgogne-Franche-Comté
- Coordinates: 47°28′17″N 3°50′50″E
- Country: France
- Region: Bourgogne-Franche-Comté
- Department: Yonne
- Arrondissement: Avallon
- Canton: Avallon
- Area^{1}: 20.64 km^{2} (7.97 sq mi)
- Highest elevation: 325 m (1,066 ft)
- Lowest elevation: 175 m (574 ft)
- Population (2023): 187
  - Density: 9.06/km^{2} (23.5/sq mi)
- Time zone: UTC+01:00 (CET)
  - Summer (DST): UTC+02:00 (CEST)
- INSEE/Postal code: 89203 /89200
- ^{1} French Land Register data, which excludes lakes, ponds, glaciers > 1 km^{2} (0.386 sq mi or 247 acres) and river estuaries.

Island is a commune in the Yonne department in Bourgogne-Franche-Comté in north-central France.

== See also ==
- Communes of the Yonne department
- Parc naturel régional du Morvan
