= Thory, Yonne =

Thory
- Commune
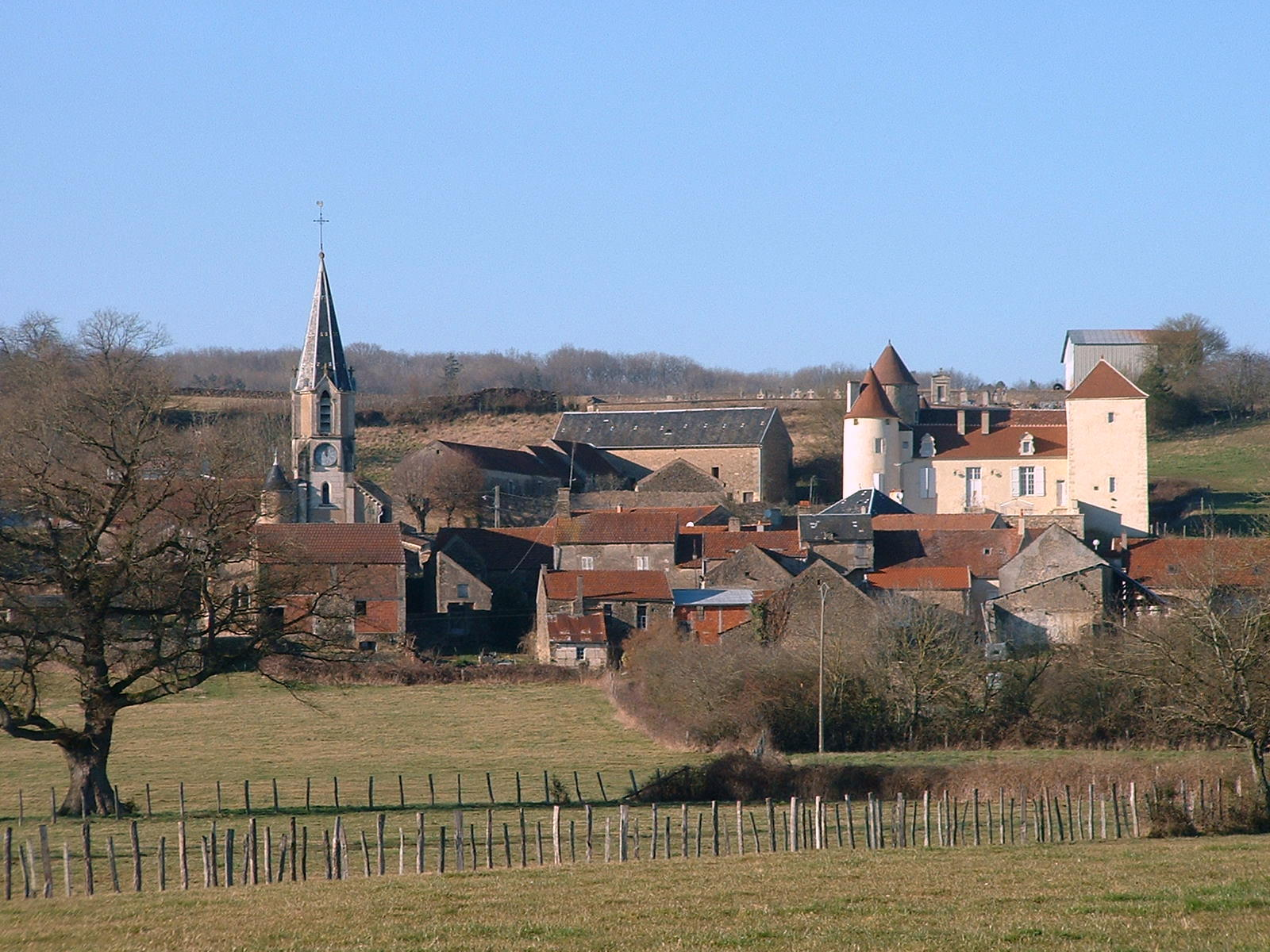
- A general view of Thory
- Location of Thory
- Location within France Location within Bourgogne-Franche-Comté
- Coordinates: 47°33′57″N 3°54′50″E
- Country: France
- Region: Bourgogne-Franche-Comté
- Department: Yonne
- Arrondissement: Avallon
- Canton: Avallon

Government
  - Mayor (2020–2026): Maryse Olivieri
- Area^{1}: 8.25 km^{2} (3.19 sq mi)
- Highest elevation: 344 m (1,129 ft)
- Lowest elevation: 224 m (735 ft)
- Population (2023): 191
  - Density: 23.2/km^{2} (60.0/sq mi)
- Time zone: UTC+01:00 (CET)
  - Summer (DST): UTC+02:00 (CEST)
- INSEE/Postal code: 89415 /89200
- ^{1} French Land Register data, which excludes lakes, ponds, glaciers > 1 km^{2} (0.386 sq mi or 247 acres) and river estuaries.

Thory (French pronunciation: [tɔʁi]) is a commune in the Yonne department in Bourgogne-Franche-Comté in north-central France.

== See also ==
- Communes of the Yonne department
