= Beauvilliers, Yonne =

Beauvilliers
- Commune
- Location of Beauvilliers
- Location within France Location within Bourgogne-Franche-Comté
- Coordinates: 47°24′55″N 4°02′32″E
- Country: France
- Region: Bourgogne-Franche-Comté
- Department: Yonne
- Arrondissement: Avallon
- Canton: Avallon

Government
  - Mayor (2020–2026): Évelyne Morizot
- Area^{1}: 6.21 km^{2} (2.40 sq mi)
- Highest elevation: 417 m (1,368 ft)
- Lowest elevation: 310 m (1,020 ft)
- Population (2023): 75
  - Density: 12/km^{2} (31/sq mi)
- Time zone: UTC+01:00 (CET)
  - Summer (DST): UTC+02:00 (CEST)
- INSEE/Postal code: 89032 /89630
- ^{1} French Land Register data, which excludes lakes, ponds, glaciers > 1 km^{2} (0.386 sq mi or 247 acres) and river estuaries.

Beauvilliers (French pronunciation: [bovilje]) is a commune in the Yonne department in Bourgogne-Franche-Comté in north-central France.

== See also ==
- Communes of the Yonne department
- Parc naturel régional du Morvan
