= Sauvigny-le-Bois =

- Commune
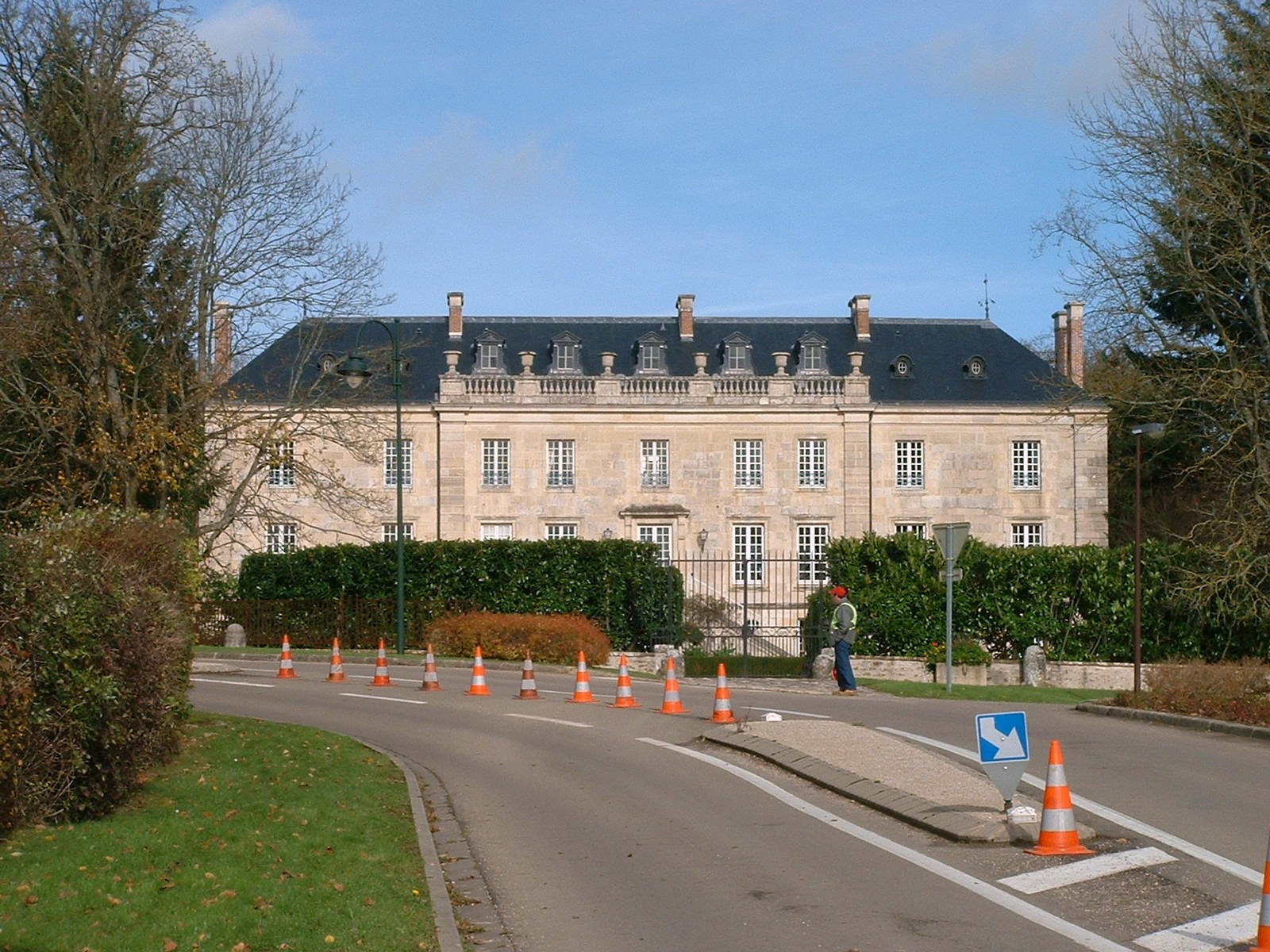
- The chateau in Sauvigny-le-Bois
- Location of Sauvigny-le-Bois
- Location within France Location within Bourgogne-Franche-Comté
- Coordinates: 47°30′50″N 3°56′29″E
- Country: France
- Region: Bourgogne-Franche-Comté
- Department: Yonne
- Arrondissement: Avallon
- Canton: Avallon

Government
  - Mayor (2020–2026): Didier Ides
- Area^{1}: 15.34 km^{2} (5.92 sq mi)
- Highest elevation: 317 m (1,040 ft)
- Lowest elevation: 230 m (750 ft)
- Population (2023): 742
  - Density: 48.4/km^{2} (125/sq mi)
- Time zone: UTC+01:00 (CET)
  - Summer (DST): UTC+02:00 (CEST)
- INSEE/Postal code: 89378 /89200
- ^{1} French Land Register data, which excludes lakes, ponds, glaciers > 1 km^{2} (0.386 sq mi or 247 acres) and river estuaries.

Sauvigny-le-Bois (French pronunciation: [soviɲi lə bwa]) is a commune in the Yonne department in Bourgogne-Franche-Comté in north-central France.

== See also ==
- Communes of the Yonne department
