= Saint-Germain-des-Champs =

- Commune
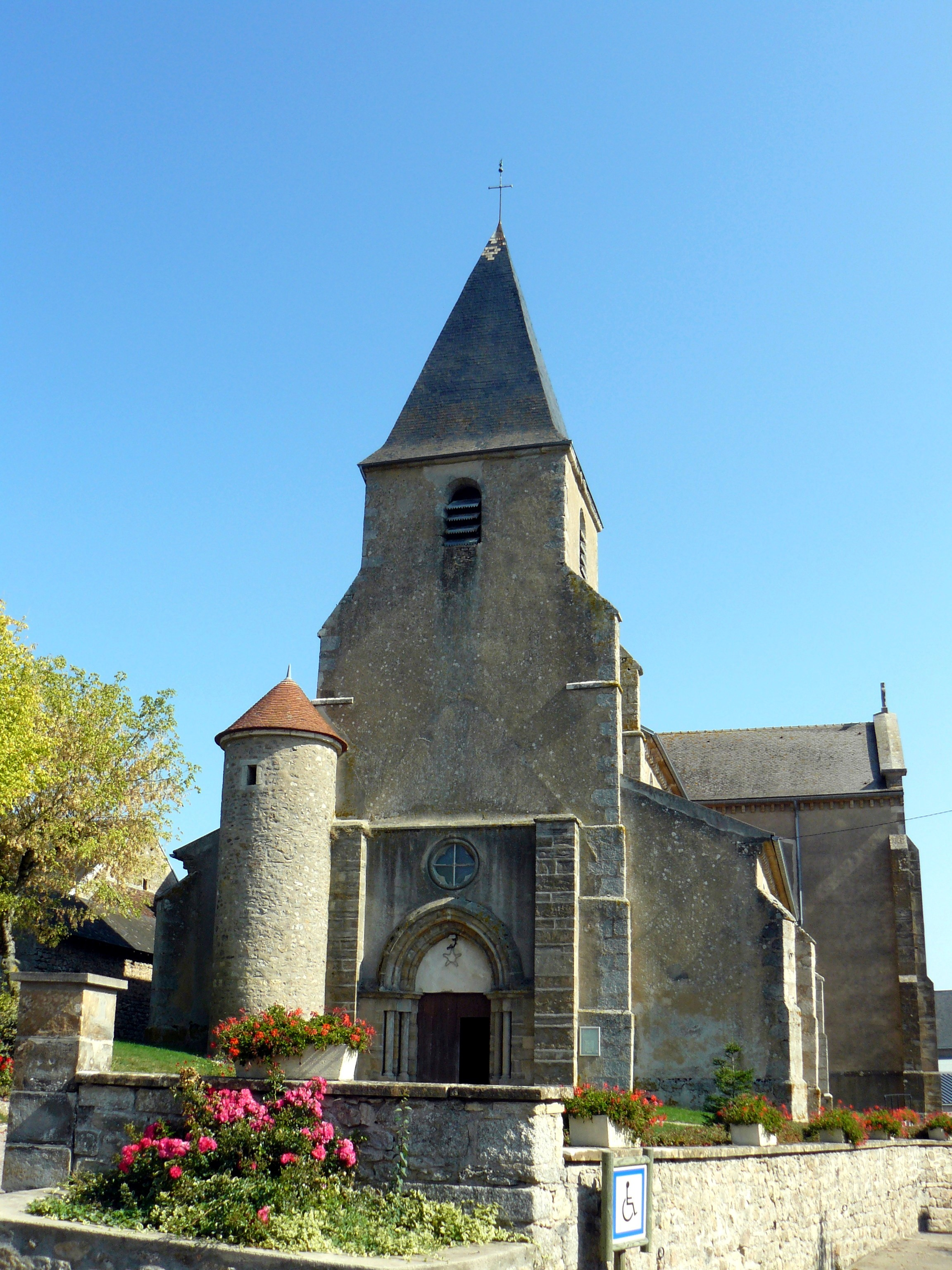
- The church in Saint-Germain-des-Champs
- Location of Saint-Germain-des-Champs
- Location within France Location within Bourgogne-Franche-Comté
- Coordinates: 47°24′41″N 3°55′20″E
- Country: France
- Region: Bourgogne-Franche-Comté
- Department: Yonne
- Arrondissement: Avallon
- Canton: Avallon

Government
  - Mayor (2020–2026): Serge Nasselevitch
- Area^{1}: 35.92 km^{2} (13.87 sq mi)
- Highest elevation: 413 m (1,355 ft)
- Lowest elevation: 235 m (771 ft)
- Population (2023): 342
  - Density: 9.52/km^{2} (24.7/sq mi)
- Time zone: UTC+01:00 (CET)
  - Summer (DST): UTC+02:00 (CEST)
- INSEE/Postal code: 89347 /89630
- ^{1} French Land Register data, which excludes lakes, ponds, glaciers > 1 km^{2} (0.386 sq mi or 247 acres) and river estuaries.

Saint-Germain-des-Champs (French pronunciation: [sɛ̃ ʒɛʁmɛ̃ de ʃɑ̃]) is a commune in the Yonne department in Bourgogne-Franche-Comté in north-central France.

== See also ==
- Communes of the Yonne department
- Parc naturel régional du Morvan
