= Nuits =

- Commune
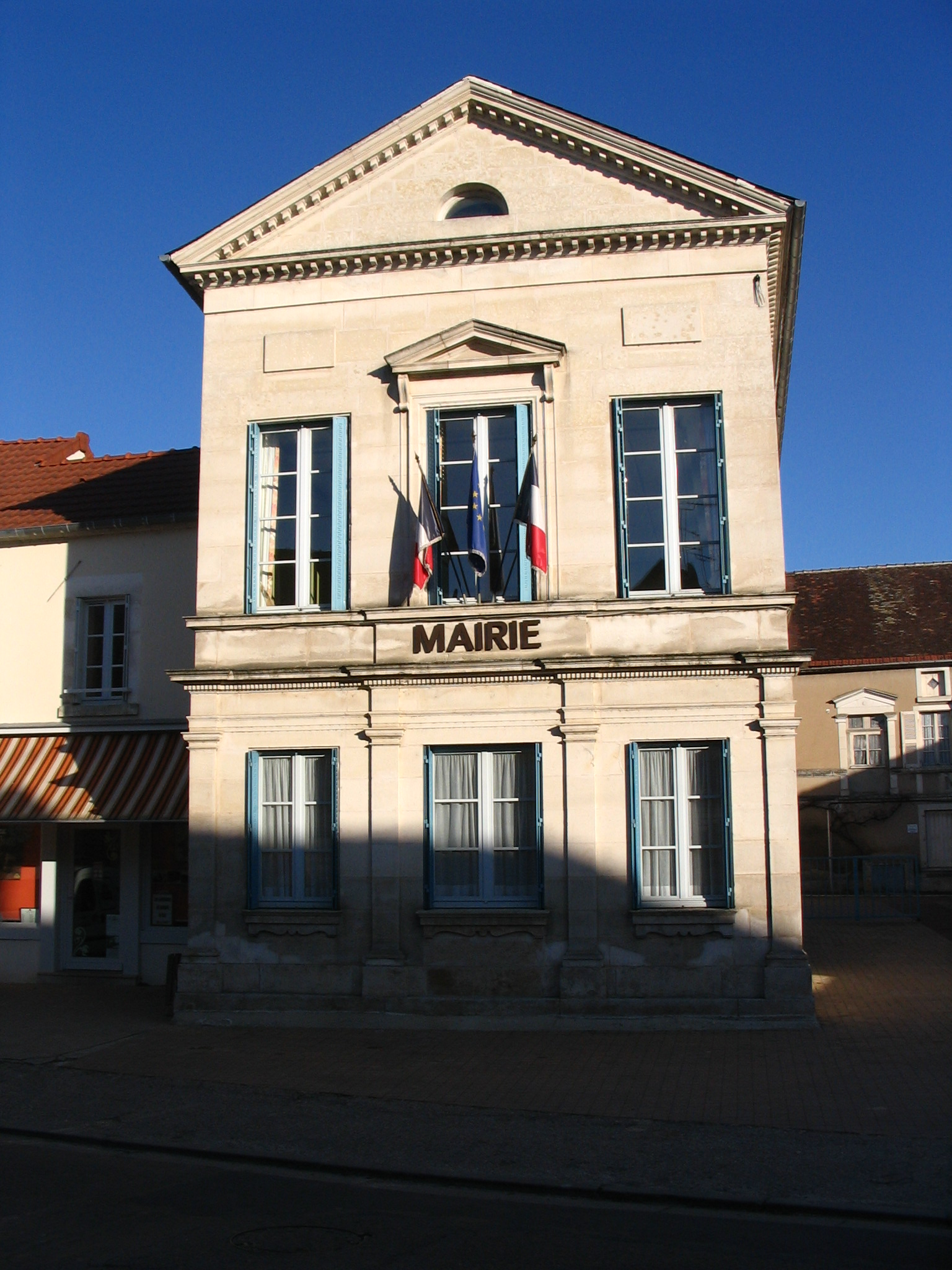
- The town hall in Nuits
- Location of Nuits
- Location within France Location within Bourgogne-Franche-Comté
- Coordinates: 47°43′55″N 4°12′50″E
- Country: France
- Region: Bourgogne-Franche-Comté
- Department: Yonne
- Arrondissement: Avallon
- Canton: Tonnerrois

Government
  - Mayor (2020–2026): Jean Louis Gonon
- Area^{1}: 11.58 km^{2} (4.47 sq mi)
- Highest elevation: 262 m (860 ft)
- Lowest elevation: 179 m (587 ft)
- Population (2023): 362
  - Density: 31.3/km^{2} (81.0/sq mi)
- Time zone: UTC+01:00 (CET)
  - Summer (DST): UTC+02:00 (CEST)
- INSEE/Postal code: 89280 /89390
- ^{1} French Land Register data, which excludes lakes, ponds, glaciers > 1 km^{2} (0.386 sq mi or 247 acres) and river estuaries.

Nuits (French pronunciation: [nɥi]; also known, though unofficially, as Nuits-sur-Armançon) is a commune in the Yonne department in Bourgogne-Franche-Comté in north-central France.

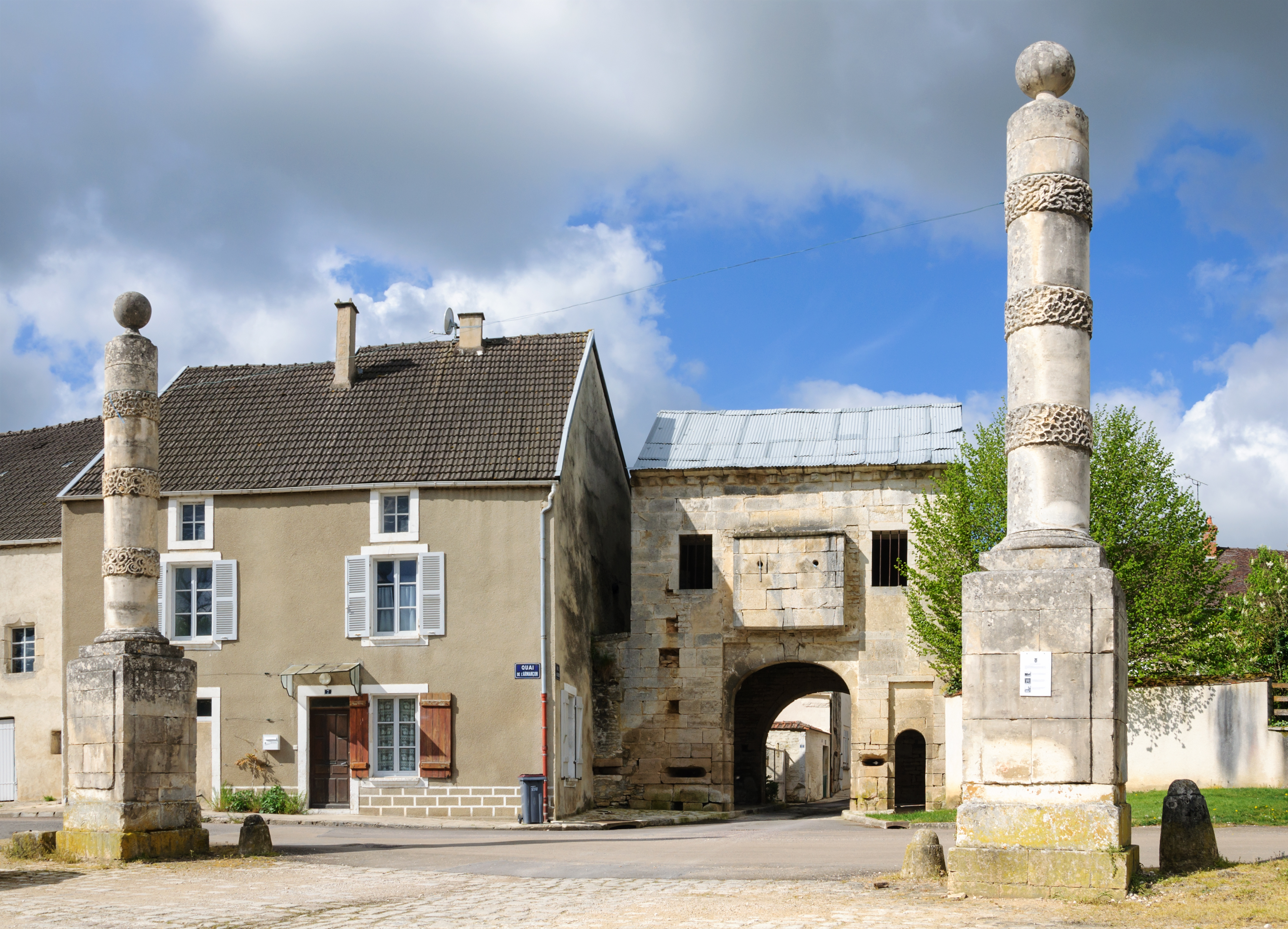

== See also ==
- Armançon river
- Communes of the Yonne department
