= Magny, Yonne =

Magny
- Commune
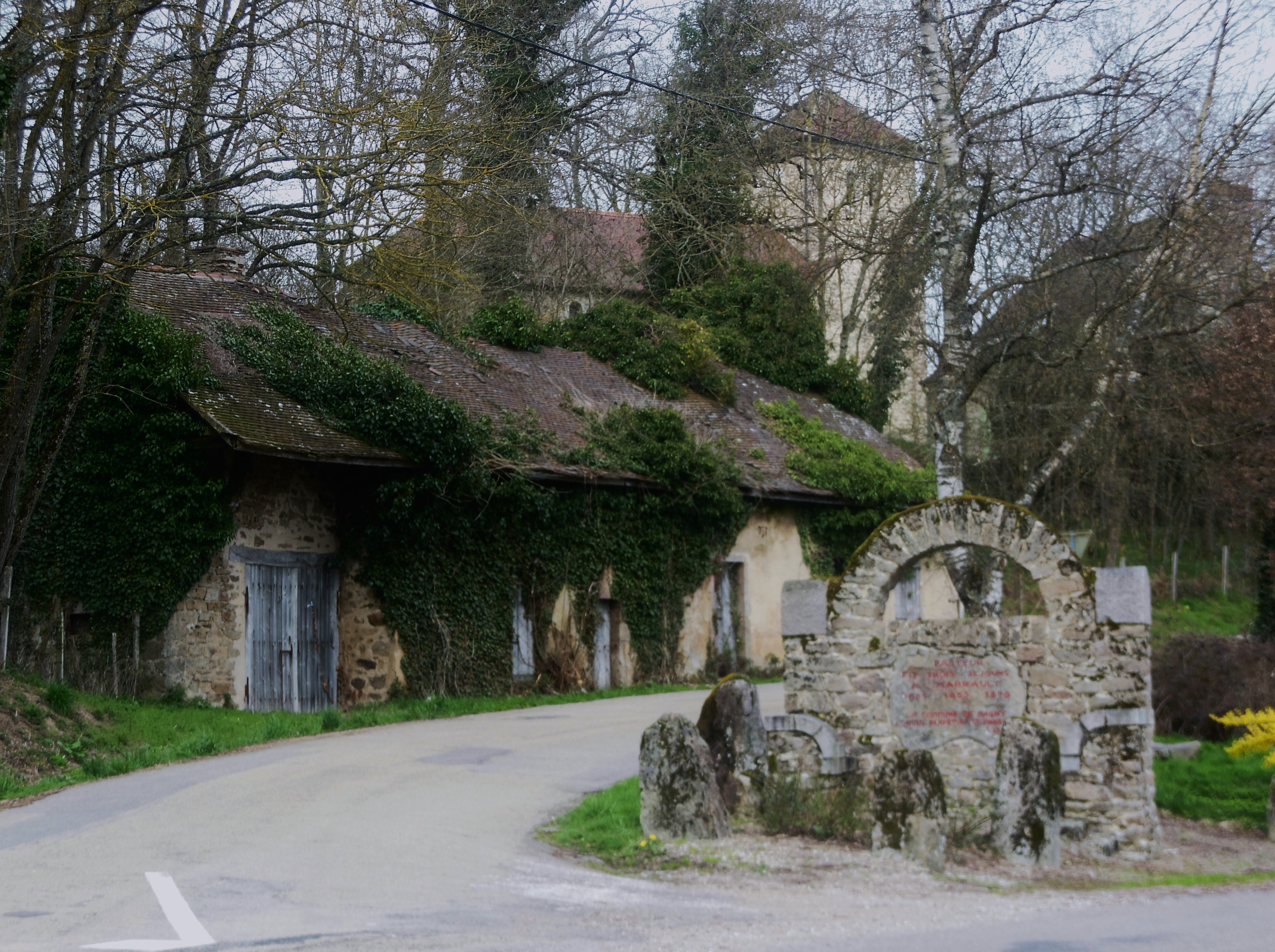
- The Pasteur monument in Magny
- Location of Magny
- Location within France Location within Bourgogne-Franche-Comté
- Coordinates: 47°28′54″N 3°58′41″E
- Country: France
- Region: Bourgogne-Franche-Comté
- Department: Yonne
- Arrondissement: Avallon
- Canton: Avallon

Government
  - Mayor (2023–2026): Martial Renault
- Area^{1}: 30.75 km^{2} (11.87 sq mi)
- Highest elevation: 381 m (1,250 ft)
- Lowest elevation: 200 m (660 ft)
- Population (2023): 870
  - Density: 28/km^{2} (73/sq mi)
- Time zone: UTC+01:00 (CET)
  - Summer (DST): UTC+02:00 (CEST)
- INSEE/Postal code: 89235 /89200
- ^{1} French Land Register data, which excludes lakes, ponds, glaciers > 1 km^{2} (0.386 sq mi or 247 acres) and river estuaries.

Magny (French pronunciation: [maɲi]) is a commune in the Yonne department in Bourgogne-Franche-Comté in north-central France.

== See also ==
- Communes of the Yonne department
- Parc naturel régional du Morvan
