= Athie, Yonne =

Athie
- Commune
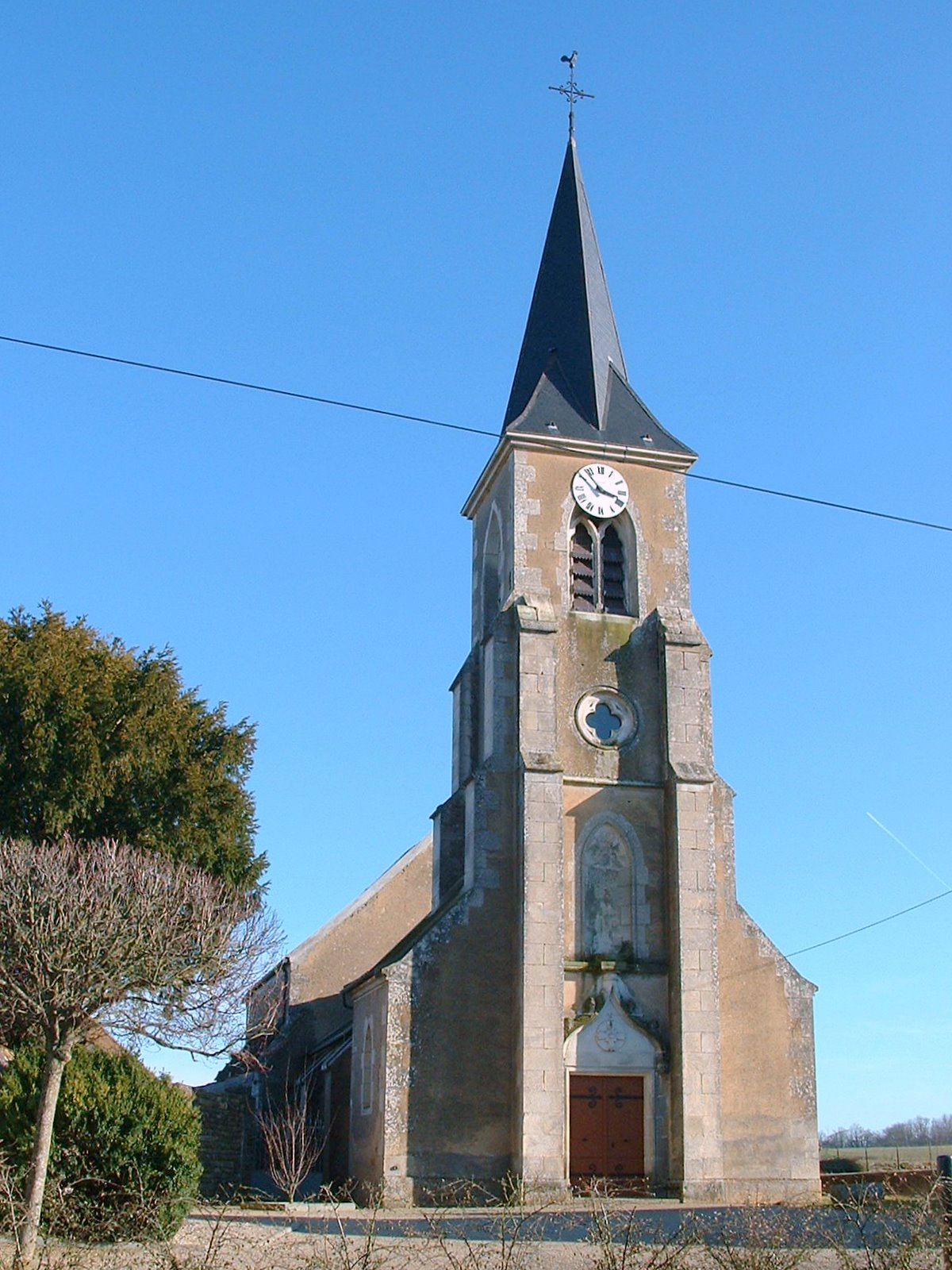
- The church in Athie
- Location of Athie
- Location within France Location within Bourgogne-Franche-Comté
- Coordinates: 47°32′22″N 3°59′27″E
- Country: France
- Region: Bourgogne-Franche-Comté
- Department: Yonne
- Arrondissement: Avallon
- Canton: Avallon
- Intercommunality: CC Avallon Vézelay Morvan

Government
  - Mayor (2020–2026): Nicolas Robert
- Area^{1}: 4.90 km^{2} (1.89 sq mi)
- Highest elevation: 302 m (991 ft)
- Lowest elevation: 208 m (682 ft)
- Population (2023): 135
  - Density: 27.6/km^{2} (71.4/sq mi)
- Time zone: UTC+01:00 (CET)
  - Summer (DST): UTC+02:00 (CEST)
- INSEE/Postal code: 89022 /89440
- ^{1} French Land Register data, which excludes lakes, ponds, glaciers > 1 km^{2} (0.386 sq mi or 247 acres) and river estuaries.

Athie (French pronunciation: [ati]) is a commune in the Yonne department in Bourgogne-Franche-Comté in north-central France.

== See also ==
- Communes of the Yonne department
