= Étaule =

- Commune
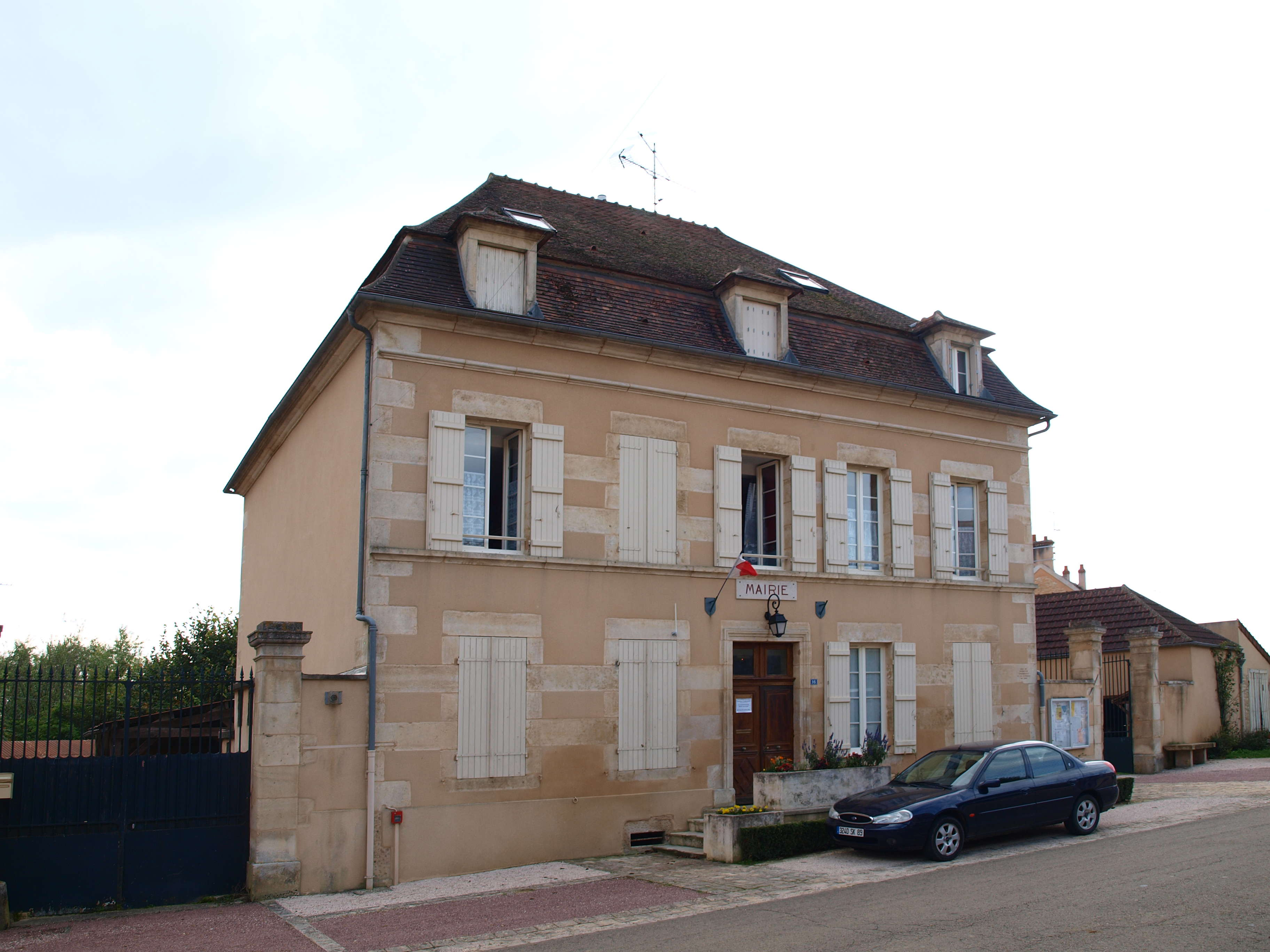
- The town hall in Étaule
- Location of Étaule
- Location within France Location within Bourgogne-Franche-Comté
- Coordinates: 47°31′19″N 3°55′15″E
- Country: France
- Region: Bourgogne-Franche-Comté
- Department: Yonne
- Arrondissement: Avallon
- Canton: Avallon

Government
  - Mayor (2020–2026): Olivier Rauscent
- Area^{1}: 8.89 km^{2} (3.43 sq mi)
- Highest elevation: 330 m (1,080 ft)
- Lowest elevation: 190 m (620 ft)
- Population (2023): 382
  - Density: 43.0/km^{2} (111/sq mi)
- Time zone: UTC+01:00 (CET)
  - Summer (DST): UTC+02:00 (CEST)
- INSEE/Postal code: 89159 /89200
- ^{1} French Land Register data, which excludes lakes, ponds, glaciers > 1 km^{2} (0.386 sq mi or 247 acres) and river estuaries.

Étaule (French pronunciation: [etol]) is a commune in the Yonne department in Bourgogne-Franche-Comté in north-central France.

== See also ==
- Communes of the Yonne department
