= Annéot =

- Commune
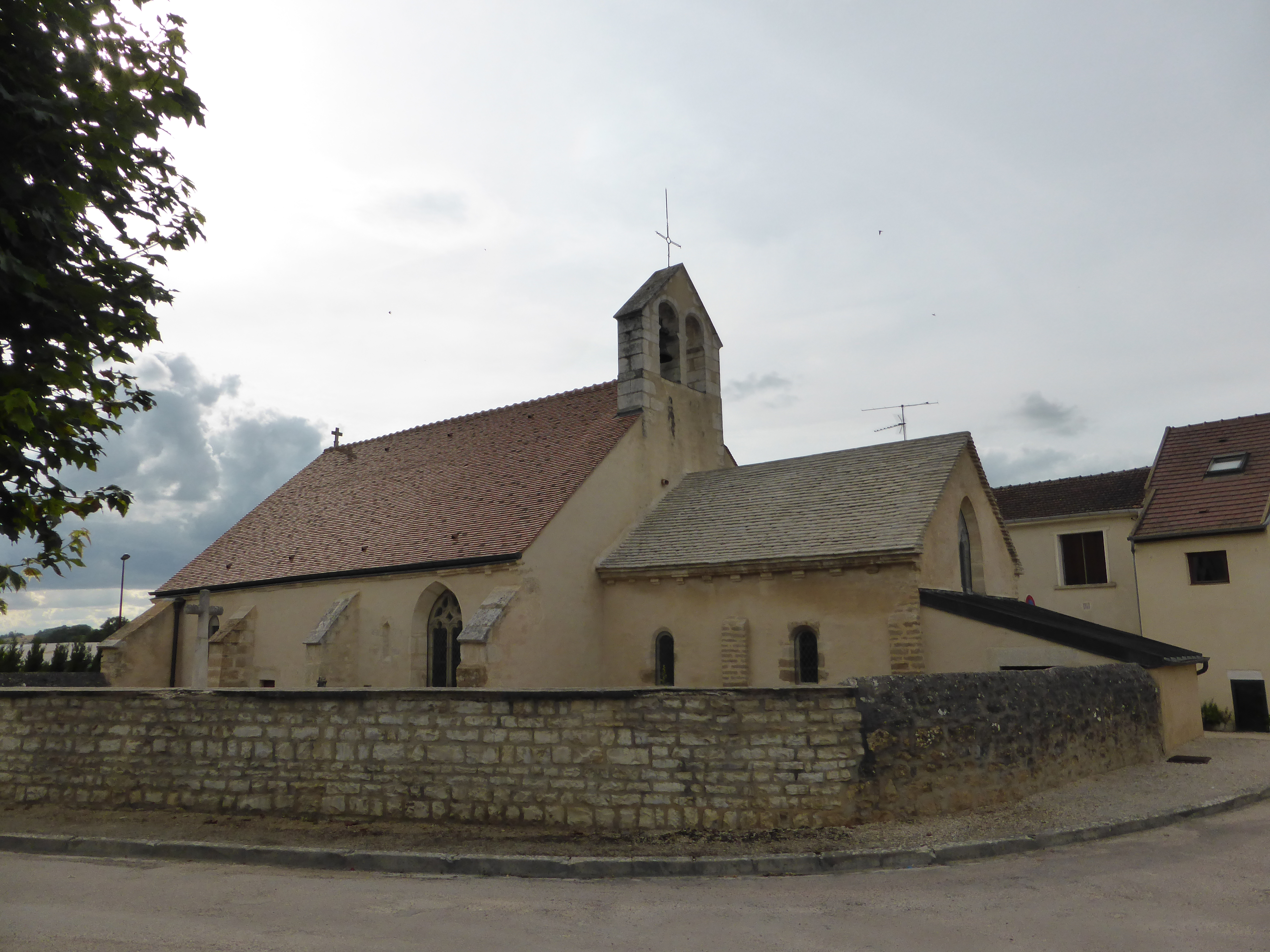
- The church in Annéot
- Location of Annéot
- Location within France Location within Bourgogne-Franche-Comté
- Coordinates: 47°31′19″N 3°52′53″E
- Country: France
- Region: Bourgogne-Franche-Comté
- Department: Yonne
- Arrondissement: Avallon
- Canton: Avallon

Government
  - Mayor (2020–2026): Pascal Germain
- Area^{1}: 6.13 km^{2} (2.37 sq mi)
- Highest elevation: 307 m (1,007 ft)
- Lowest elevation: 152 m (499 ft)
- Population (2023): 112
  - Density: 18.3/km^{2} (47.3/sq mi)
- Time zone: UTC+01:00 (CET)
  - Summer (DST): UTC+02:00 (CEST)
- INSEE/Postal code: 89011 /89200
- ^{1} French Land Register data, which excludes lakes, ponds, glaciers > 1 km^{2} (0.386 sq mi or 247 acres) and river estuaries.

Annéot (French pronunciation: [aneo]) is a commune in the Yonne department in Bourgogne-Franche-Comté in north-central France.

== See also ==
- Communes of the Yonne department
