= Provency =

- Commune
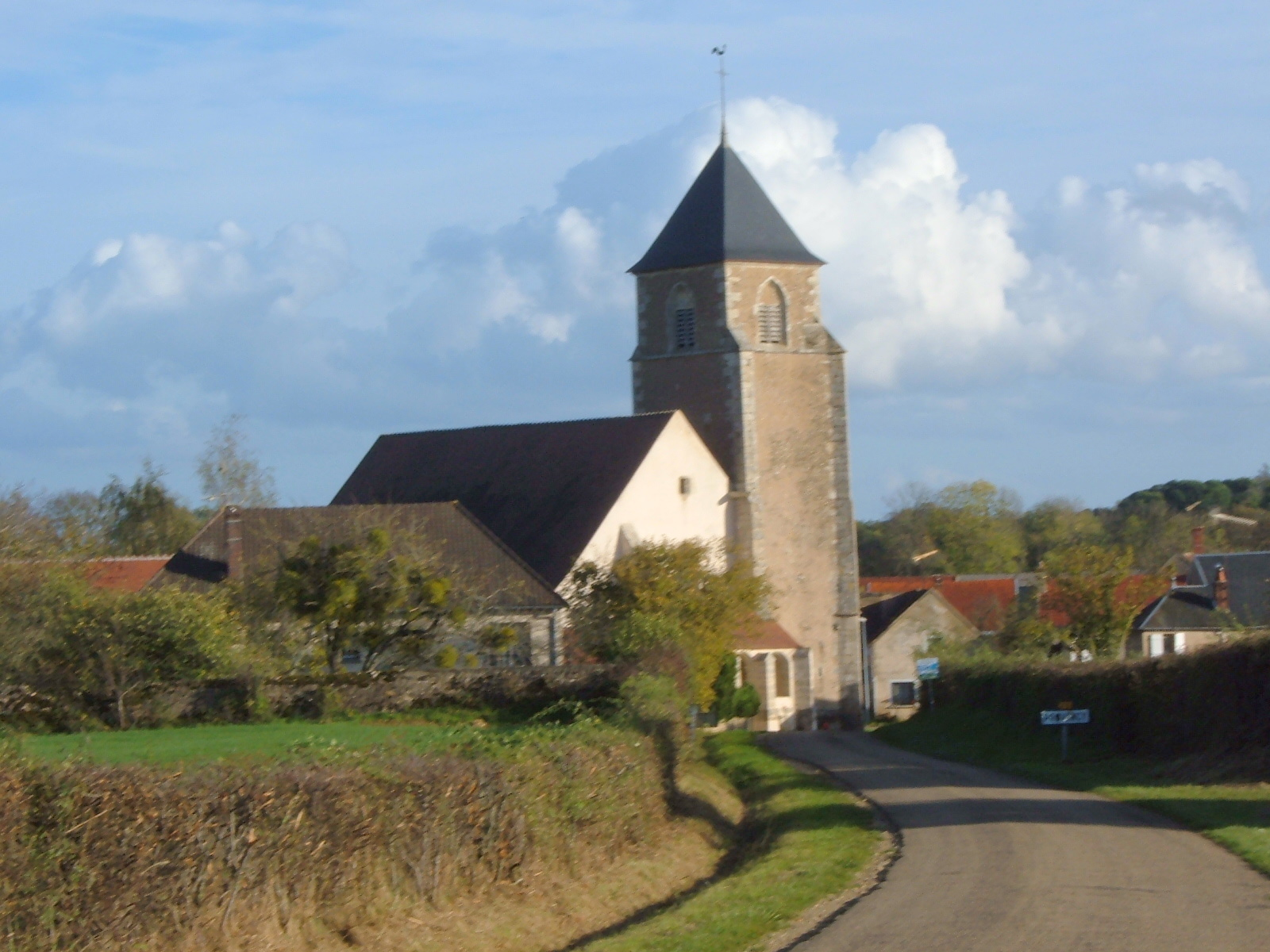
- The church in Provency

- Coat of arms
- Location of Provency
- Location within France Location within Bourgogne-Franche-Comté
- Coordinates: 47°32′50″N 3°57′23″E
- Country: France
- Region: Bourgogne-Franche-Comté
- Department: Yonne
- Arrondissement: Avallon
- Canton: Avallon

Government
  - Mayor (2020–2026): Jean-Claude Landrier
- Area^{1}: 11.88 km^{2} (4.59 sq mi)
- Highest elevation: 328 m (1,076 ft)
- Lowest elevation: 229 m (751 ft)
- Population (2023): 250
  - Density: 21/km^{2} (55/sq mi)
- Time zone: UTC+01:00 (CET)
  - Summer (DST): UTC+02:00 (CEST)
- INSEE/Postal code: 89316 /89200
- ^{1} French Land Register data, which excludes lakes, ponds, glaciers > 1 km^{2} (0.386 sq mi or 247 acres) and river estuaries.

Provency (French pronunciation: [pʁɔvɑ̃si]) is a commune in the Yonne department in Bourgogne-Franche-Comté in north-central France.

== See also ==
- Communes of the Yonne department
