= Annay-la-Côte =

- Commune
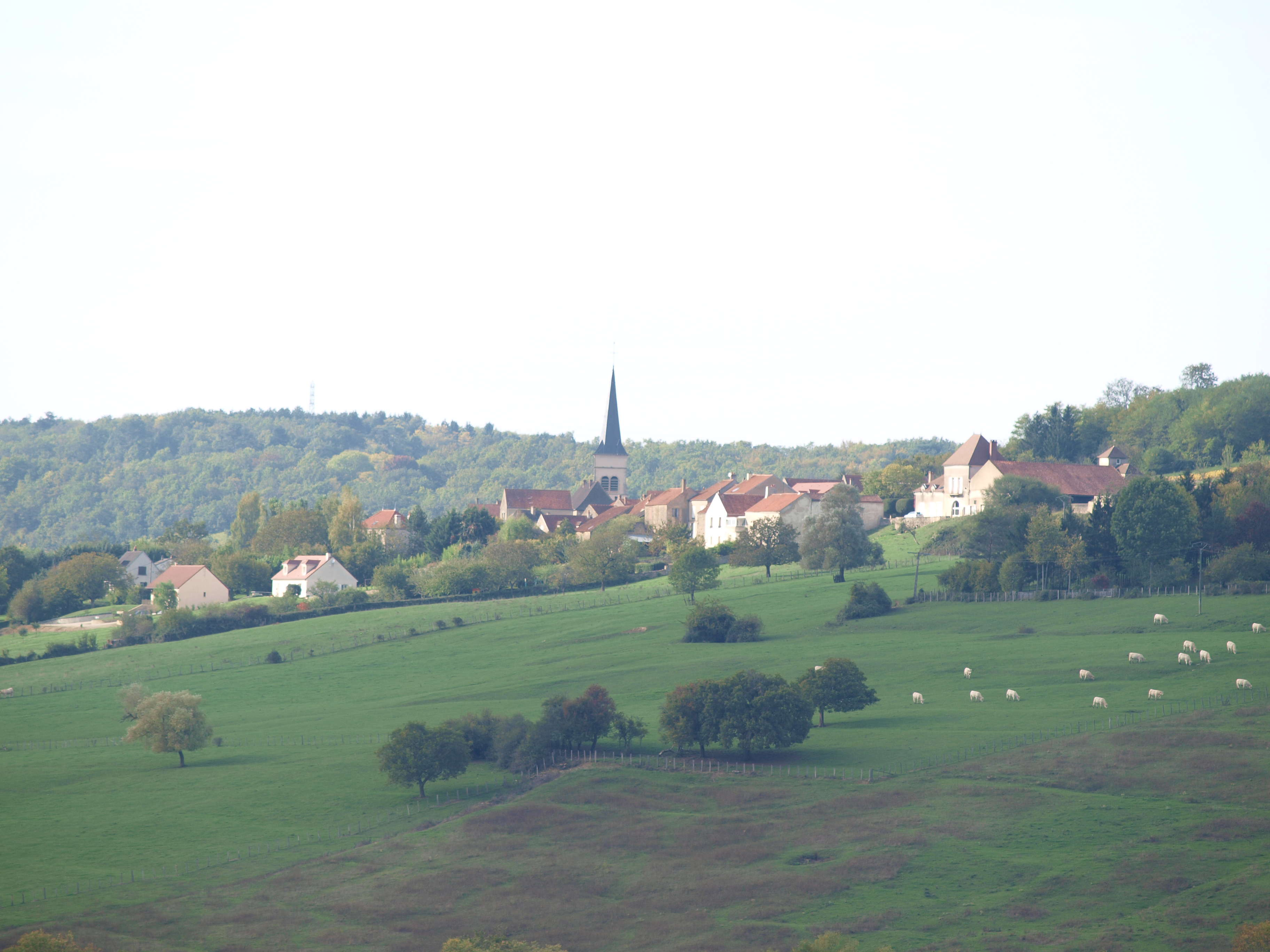
- A general view of Annay-la-Côte
- Location of Annay-la-Côte
- Location within France Location within Bourgogne-Franche-Comté
- Coordinates: 47°32′08″N 3°53′18″E
- Country: France
- Region: Bourgogne-Franche-Comté
- Department: Yonne
- Arrondissement: Avallon
- Canton: Avallon

Government
  - Mayor (2020–2026): Chantal Guignepied
- Area^{1}: 12.92 km^{2} (4.99 sq mi)
- Highest elevation: 357 m (1,171 ft)
- Lowest elevation: 160 m (520 ft)
- Population (2023): 329
  - Density: 25.5/km^{2} (66.0/sq mi)
- Time zone: UTC+01:00 (CET)
  - Summer (DST): UTC+02:00 (CEST)
- INSEE/Postal code: 89009 /89200
- ^{1} French Land Register data, which excludes lakes, ponds, glaciers > 1 km^{2} (0.386 sq mi or 247 acres) and river estuaries.

Annay-la-Côte (French pronunciation: [anɛ la kot]) is a commune in the Yonne department in Bourgogne-Franche-Comté in north-central France.

== See also ==
- Communes of the Yonne department
