= Quarré-les-Tombes =

- Commune
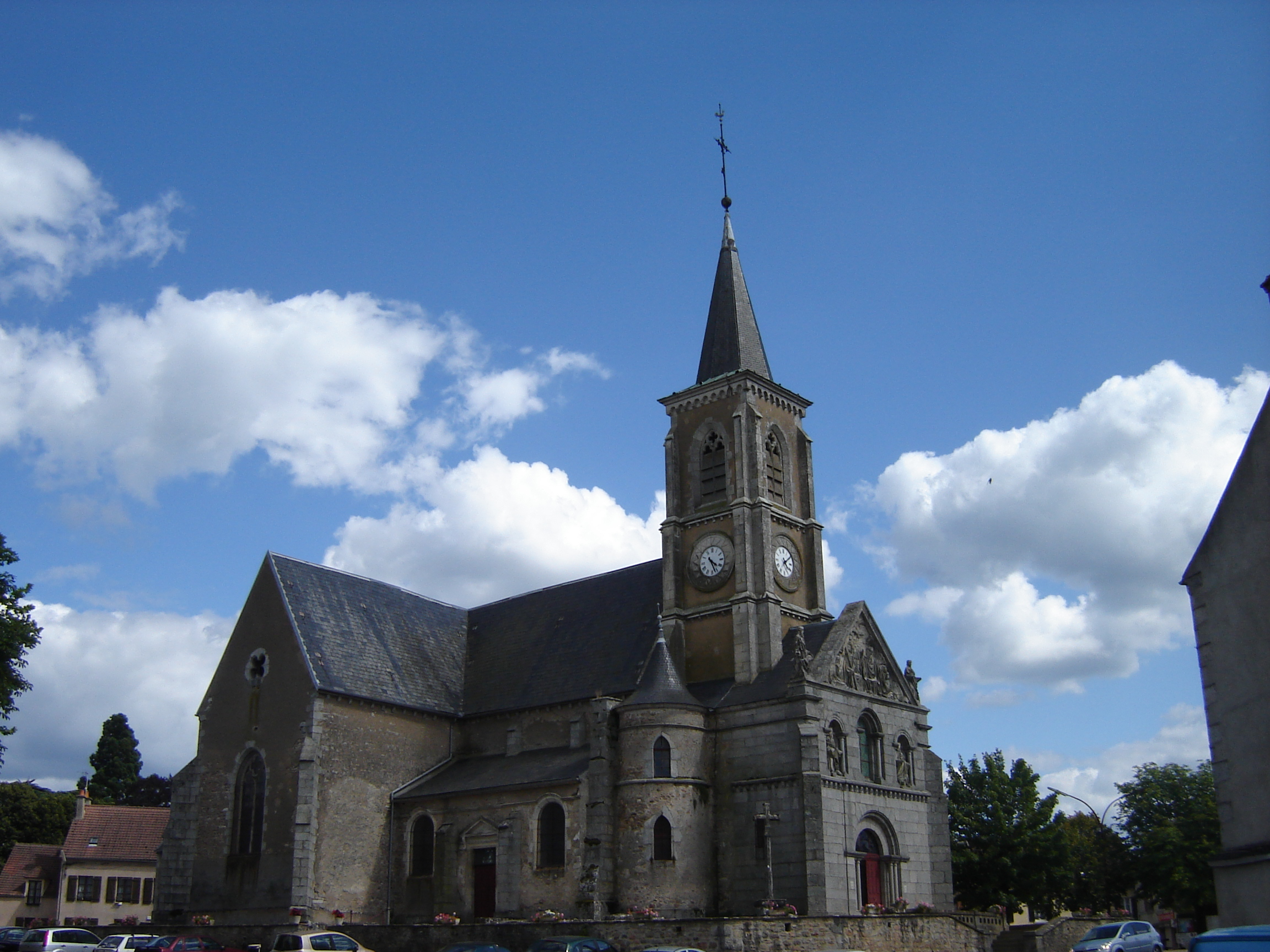
- The church in Quarré-les-Tombes

- Coat of arms
- Location of Quarré-les-Tombes
- Location within France Location within Bourgogne-Franche-Comté
- Coordinates: 47°22′07″N 3°59′54″E
- Country: France
- Region: Bourgogne-Franche-Comté
- Department: Yonne
- Arrondissement: Avallon
- Canton: Avallon
- Intercommunality: Avallon-Vézelay-Morvan

Government
  - Mayor (2020–2026): Bernard Ragage
- Area^{1}: 46.05 km^{2} (17.78 sq mi)
- Highest elevation: 606 m (1,988 ft)
- Lowest elevation: 298 m (978 ft)
- Population (2023): 619
  - Density: 13.4/km^{2} (34.8/sq mi)
- Time zone: UTC+01:00 (CET)
  - Summer (DST): UTC+02:00 (CEST)
- INSEE/Postal code: 89318 /89630
- ^{1} French Land Register data, which excludes lakes, ponds, glaciers > 1 km^{2} (0.386 sq mi or 247 acres) and river estuaries.

Quarré-les-Tombes (French pronunciation: [kaʁe le tɔ̃b]) is a commune in the Yonne department in Bourgogne-Franche-Comté in north-central France.

== Population ==
Historical population
Year	Pop.	±% p.a.
1968	984	—
1975	863	−1.86%
1982	772	−1.58%
1990	735	−0.61%
1999	723	−0.18%
2007	716	−0.12%
2012	730	+0.39%
2017	645	−2.45%
2023	619	−0.68%
Source: INSEE

== Geography ==
The commune is located in the Morvan between the valleys of the Cure and Trinquelin. It is located on a granite hilltop of 450 meters altitude, which exposes the village to the northern winds and cold temperatures

The commune is located at a crossroads of these routes:

1. Avallon to St. Brisson,
2. de Rouvray to Lormes
3. Quarré to Cussy-les-Forges
4. Quarré to Châtel Censoir

The commune has 37 hamlets.

=== Hamlets ===
Hamlets of archaeological or historical interest are:

- Champlois whose large pavilion was a feudal manor.
- The Gorge, which had a mansion in 1280 (owner Jean de Roilly).
- Villiers-les Pautots whose name comes from a Roman villa and the family nickname.
- Velars-le-Comte is of Roman origin (tiles, medals and statues recovered). In 1325 it belonged to Guyot of Veillart.
- Les Iles-Ménéfriers is known mainly for the accumulation of rocks called Roche des Fées.
- Les Mathieux housed a chapel dedicated to St. Eptade until 1667 .
- Au Moulin-Colas has remnants of Roman buildings.

== History ==
In the seventh century, the village was named Quarreia, then was called Quarée until the eighteenth century. The current name of town comes from the large number of empty stone coffins ("tombes") in the graveyard surrounding the church.

Quarré, formerly Careacum, belonged to Corbon, Lord of Corbigny, who bequeathed it to his son in 706 at the Abbey of Flavigny.

In the eleventh century, the village was owned by the Sires de Chastellux, Counts of Quarré. The castle was built in 1863.

The church has undergone several reconstructions including one in the fifteenth century. The chair and bench are carved in the style of Louis XIII.

== See also ==
- Communes of the Yonne department
- Parc naturel régional du Morvan
