= Pontaubert =

- Commune
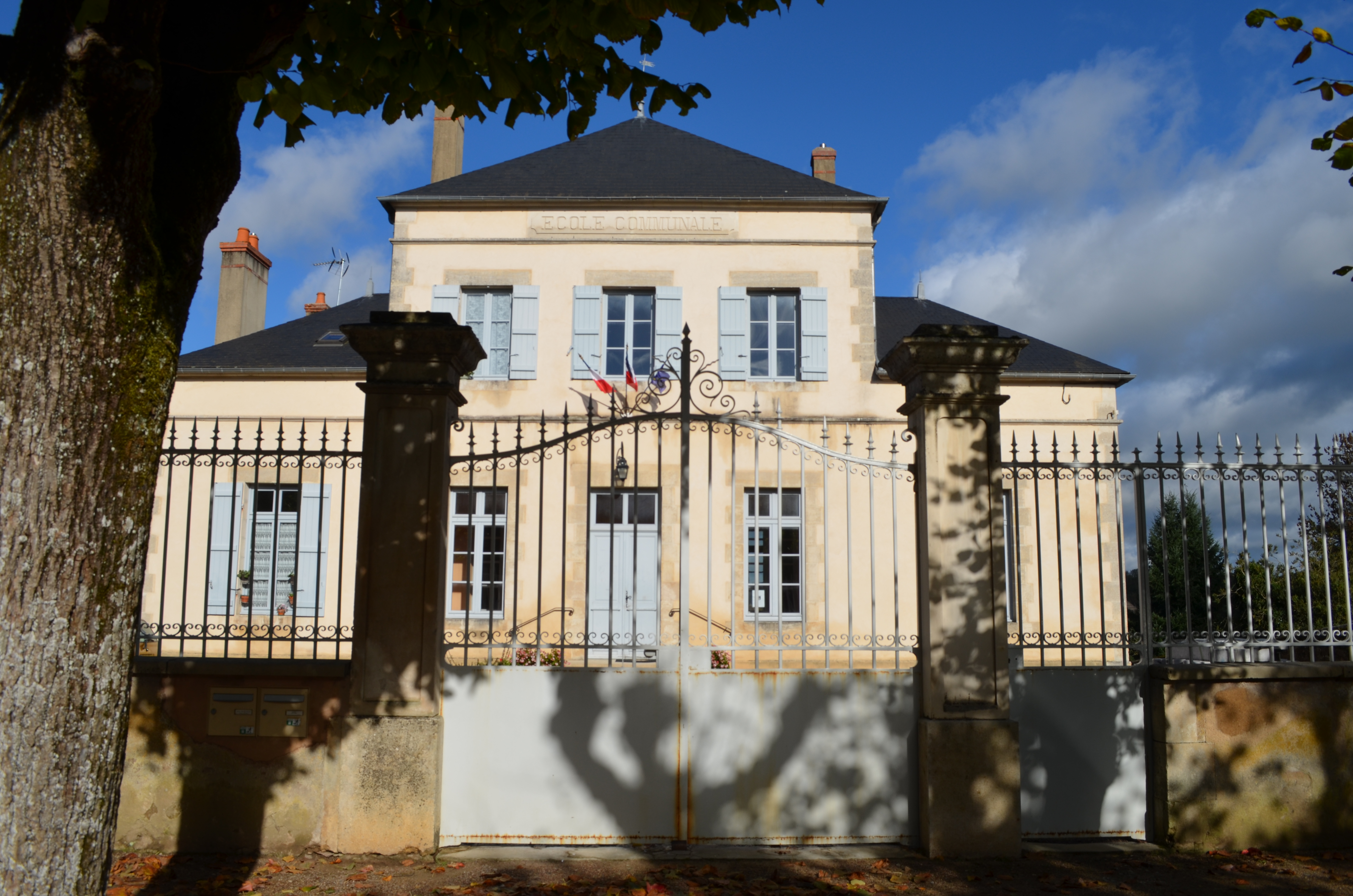
- The town hall in Pontaubert
- Location of Pontaubert
- Location within France Location within Bourgogne-Franche-Comté
- Coordinates: 47°29′24″N 3°51′36″E
- Country: France
- Region: Bourgogne-Franche-Comté
- Department: Yonne
- Arrondissement: Avallon
- Canton: Avallon

Government
  - Mayor (2020–2026): Chantal Hochart
- Area^{1}: 3.91 km^{2} (1.51 sq mi)
- Highest elevation: 232 m (761 ft)
- Lowest elevation: 149 m (489 ft)
- Population (2023): 355
  - Density: 90.8/km^{2} (235/sq mi)
- Time zone: UTC+01:00 (CET)
  - Summer (DST): UTC+02:00 (CEST)
- INSEE/Postal code: 89306 /89200
- ^{1} French Land Register data, which excludes lakes, ponds, glaciers > 1 km^{2} (0.386 sq mi or 247 acres) and river estuaries.

Pontaubert (French pronunciation: [pɔ̃tobɛʁ]) is a commune in the Yonne department in Bourgogne-Franche-Comté in north-central France.

== See also ==
- Communes of the Yonne department
- Parc naturel régional du Morvan
