= Buffon, Côte-d'Or =

Buffon
- Commune
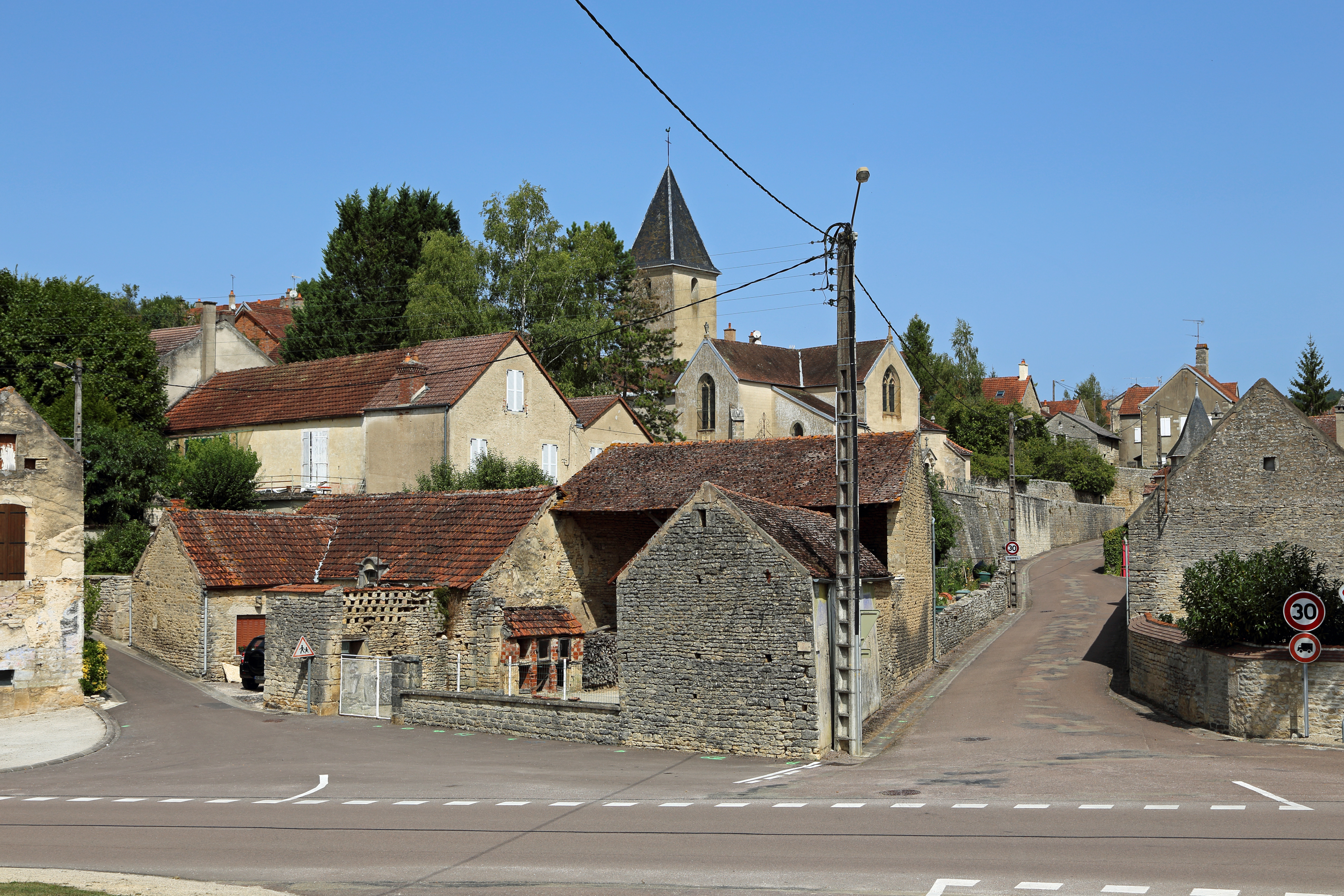
- Buffon: the village
- Location of Buffon
- Location within France Location within Bourgogne-Franche-Comté
- Coordinates: 47°39′04″N 4°16′32″E
- Country: France
- Region: Bourgogne-Franche-Comté
- Department: Côte-d'Or
- Arrondissement: Montbard
- Canton: Montbard

Government
  - Mayor (2020–2026): Jean-Pierre Dzieciol
- Area^{1}: 8.88 km^{2} (3.43 sq mi)
- Elevation: 225 m (738 ft)
- Highest elevation: 347 m (1,138 ft)
- Lowest elevation: 197 m (646 ft)
- Population (2023): 152
  - Density: 17.1/km^{2} (44.3/sq mi)
- Time zone: UTC+01:00 (CET)
  - Summer (DST): UTC+02:00 (CEST)
- INSEE/Postal code: 21114 /21500
- ^{1} French Land Register data, which excludes lakes, ponds, glaciers > 1 km^{2} (0.386 sq mi or 247 acres) and river estuaries.

Buffon (French pronunciation: [byfɔ̃]) is a commune in the Côte-d'Or department, in eastern France.

== Population ==
Historical population
Year	Pop.	±% p.a.
1968	187	—
1975	175	−0.94%
1982	167	−0.67%
1990	190	+1.63%
1999	187	−0.18%
2007	178	−0.61%
2012	159	−2.23%
2017	176	+2.05%
2023	152	−2.41%
Source: INSEE

== Personalities ==
- Georges-Louis Leclerc, Comte de Buffon established ironworks there (Forges de Buffon).

== See also ==
- Communes of the Côte-d'Or department
