= Vault-de-Lugny =

- Commune
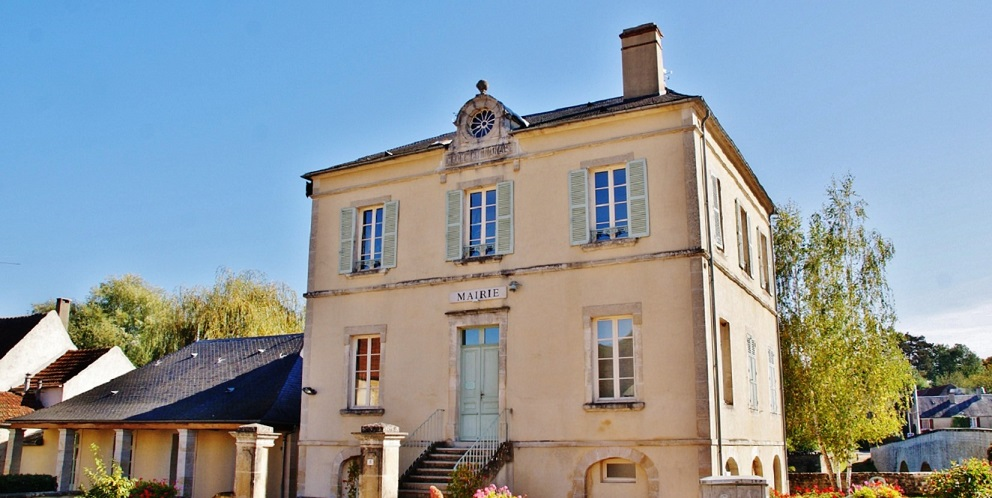
- The town hall in Vault-de-Lugny
- Location of Vault-de-Lugny
- Location within France Location within Bourgogne-Franche-Comté
- Coordinates: 47°29′56″N 3°51′05″E
- Country: France
- Region: Bourgogne-Franche-Comté
- Department: Yonne
- Arrondissement: Avallon
- Canton: Avallon

Government
  - Mayor (2020–2026): Alain Viteau
- Area^{1}: 15.20 km^{2} (5.87 sq mi)
- Highest elevation: 351 m (1,152 ft)
- Lowest elevation: 138 m (453 ft)
- Population (2023): 271
  - Density: 17.8/km^{2} (46.2/sq mi)
- Time zone: UTC+01:00 (CET)
  - Summer (DST): UTC+02:00 (CEST)
- INSEE/Postal code: 89433 /89200
- ^{1} French Land Register data, which excludes lakes, ponds, glaciers > 1 km^{2} (0.386 sq mi or 247 acres) and river estuaries.

Vault-de-Lugny (French pronunciation: [vo də lyɲi]) is a commune in the Yonne department in Bourgogne-Franche-Comté in north-central France.

== See also ==
- Communes of the Yonne department
