= Pacy-sur-Armançon =

- Commune
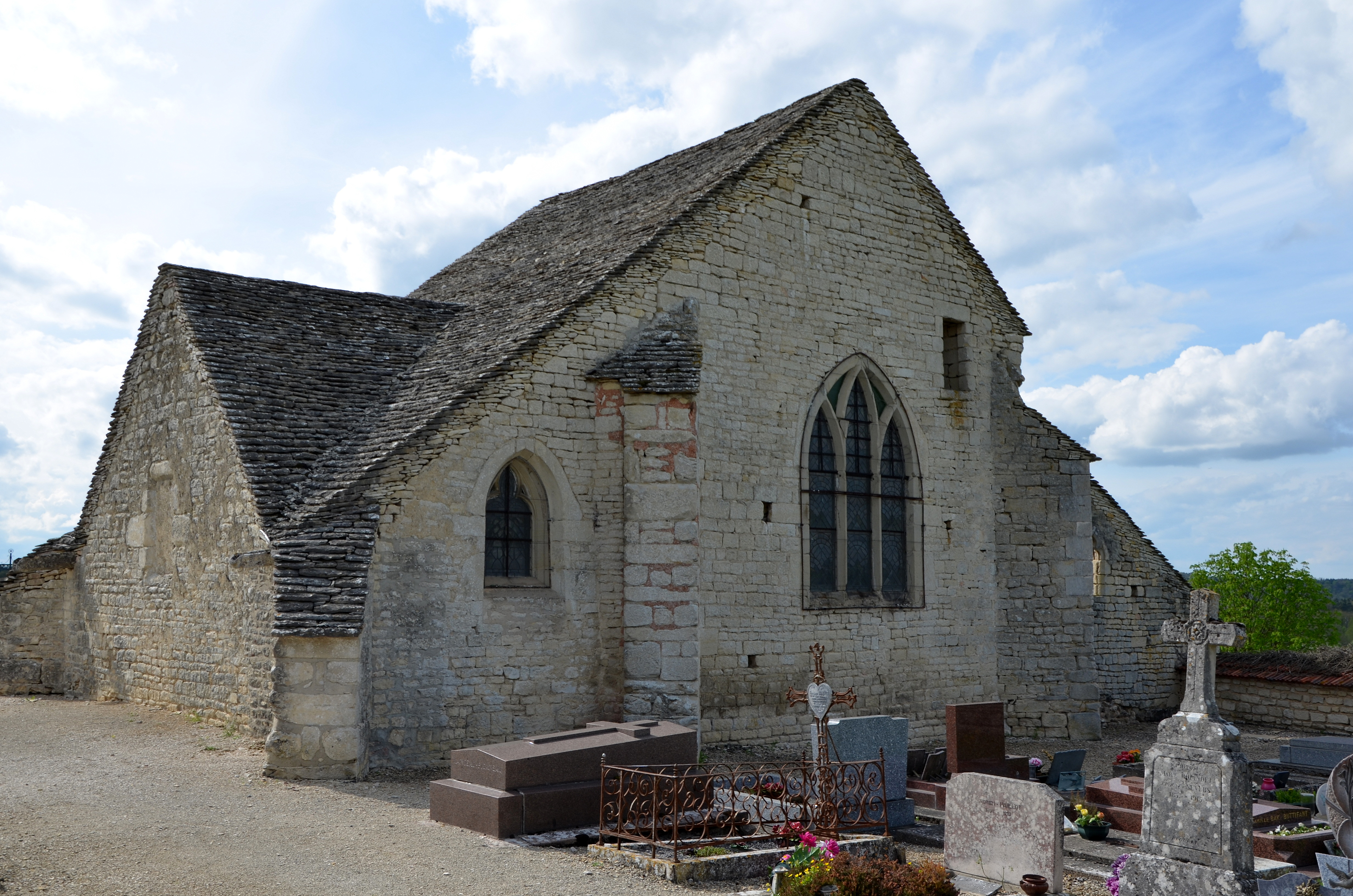
- The chapel in Pacy-sur-Armançon

- Coat of arms
- Location of Pacy-sur-Armançon
- Location within France Location within Bourgogne-Franche-Comté
- Coordinates: 47°46′41″N 4°05′41″E
- Country: France
- Region: Bourgogne-Franche-Comté
- Department: Yonne
- Arrondissement: Avallon
- Canton: Tonnerrois
- Intercommunality: Le Tonnerrois en Bourgogne

Government
  - Mayor (2020–2026): Jean-Luc Goux
- Area^{1}: 13.35 km^{2} (5.15 sq mi)
- Highest elevation: 266 m (873 ft)
- Lowest elevation: 163 m (535 ft)
- Population (2023): 178
  - Density: 13.3/km^{2} (34.5/sq mi)
- Time zone: UTC+01:00 (CET)
  - Summer (DST): UTC+02:00 (CEST)
- INSEE/Postal code: 89284 /89160
- ^{1} French Land Register data, which excludes lakes, ponds, glaciers > 1 km^{2} (0.386 sq mi or 247 acres) and river estuaries.

Pacy-sur-Armançon (French pronunciation: [pasi syʁ aʁmɑ̃sɔ̃], literally Pacy on Armançon) is a commune in the Yonne department in Bourgogne-Franche-Comté in north-central France.

== Population ==
Historical population
Year	Pop.	±% p.a.
1968	267	—
1975	254	−0.71%
1982	221	−1.97%
1990	205	−0.94%
1999	233	+1.43%
2007	234	+0.05%
2012	192	−3.88%
2017	191	−0.10%
2023	178	−1.17%
Source: INSEE

== See also ==
- Communes of the Yonne department
