= Canton of Avallon =

Coordinates: 47.49°N 3.91°E

The canton of Avallon is an administrative division of the Yonne department, central France. Its borders were modified at the French canton reorganisation which came into effect in March 2015. Its seat is in Avallon.

It consists of the following communes:

1. Annay-la-Côte
2. Annéot
3. Athie
4. Avallon
5. Beauvilliers
6. Bussières
7. Chastellux-sur-Cure
8. Cussy-les-Forges
9. Domecy-sur-le-Vault
10. Étaule
11. Girolles
12. Island
13. Lucy-le-Bois
14. Magny
15. Menades
16. Pontaubert
17. Provency
18. Quarré-les-Tombes
19. Saint-Brancher
20. Sainte-Magnance
21. Saint-Germain-des-Champs
22. Saint-Léger-Vauban
23. Sauvigny-le-Bois
24. Sermizelles
25. Tharot
26. Thory
27. Vault-de-Lugny
