= Girolles, Yonne =

Girolles
- Commune
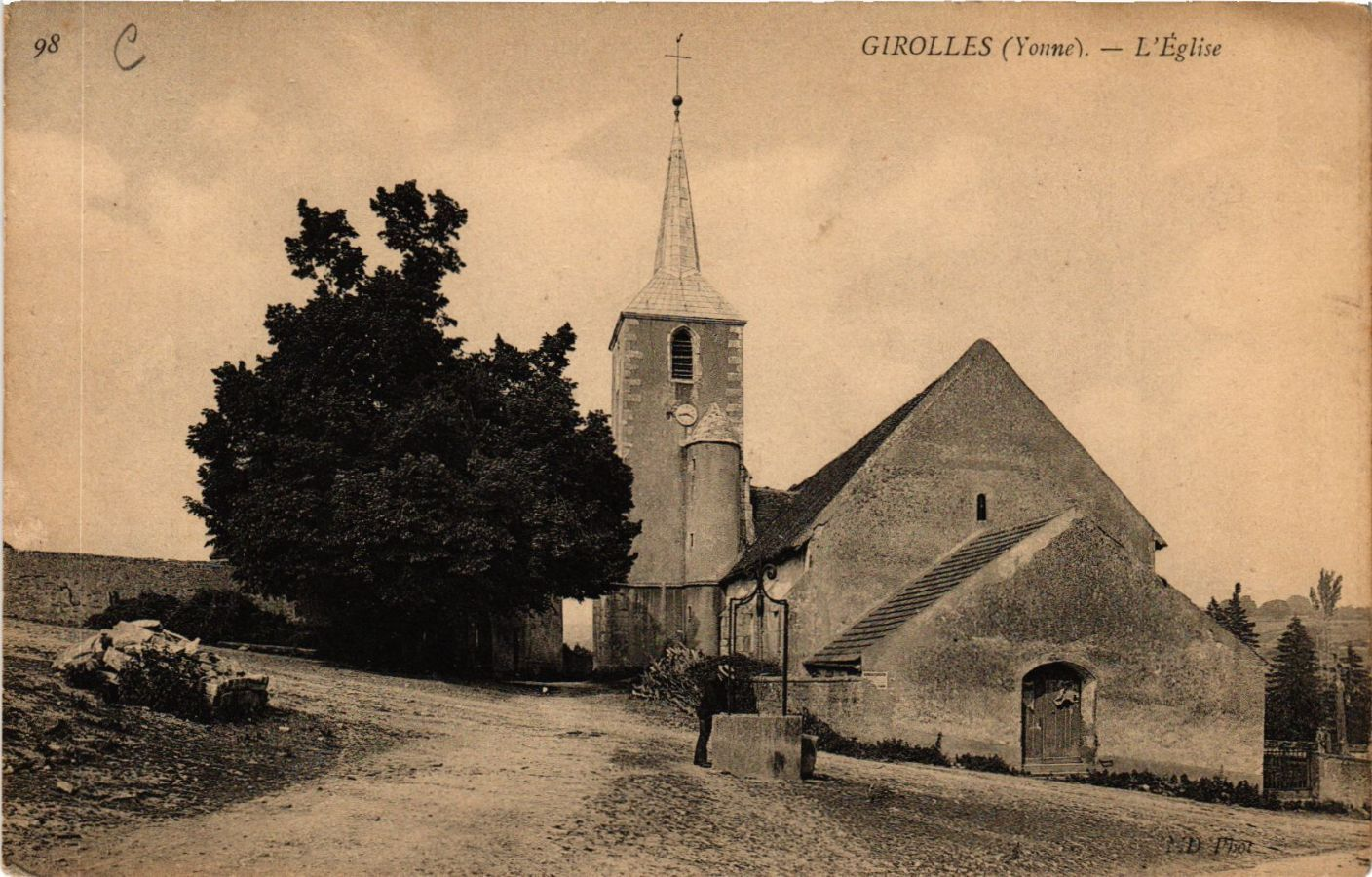
- Saint Didier's church (c. 1920)
- Location of Girolles
- Location within France Location within Bourgogne-Franche-Comté
- Coordinates: 47°31′59″N 3°50′36″E
- Country: France
- Region: Bourgogne-Franche-Comté
- Department: Yonne
- Arrondissement: Avallon
- Canton: Avallon

Government
  - Mayor (2020–2026): Bernard Massol
- Area^{1}: 16.35 km^{2} (6.31 sq mi)
- Highest elevation: 346 m (1,135 ft)
- Lowest elevation: 145 m (476 ft)
- Population (2023): 200
  - Density: 12/km^{2} (32/sq mi)
- Time zone: UTC+01:00 (CET)
  - Summer (DST): UTC+02:00 (CEST)
- INSEE/Postal code: 89188 /89200
- ^{1} French Land Register data, which excludes lakes, ponds, glaciers > 1 km^{2} (0.386 sq mi or 247 acres) and river estuaries.

Girolles (French pronunciation: [ʒiʁɔl]) is a commune in the Yonne department in Bourgogne-Franche-Comté in north-central France.

== See also ==
- Communes of the Yonne department
