= Chazeuil =

Chazeuil is the name of the following communes in France:

- Chazeuil, Côte-d'Or, in the Côte-d'Or department
- Chazeuil, Nièvre, in the Nièvre department
