= Chaumot =

Chaumot is the name of the following communes in France:

- Chaumot, Nièvre, in the Nièvre department
- Chaumot, Yonne, in the Yonne department
