= Arrondissement of Clamecy =

Coordinates: 47°27′39″N 3°31′13″E

Clamecy
- Arrondissement
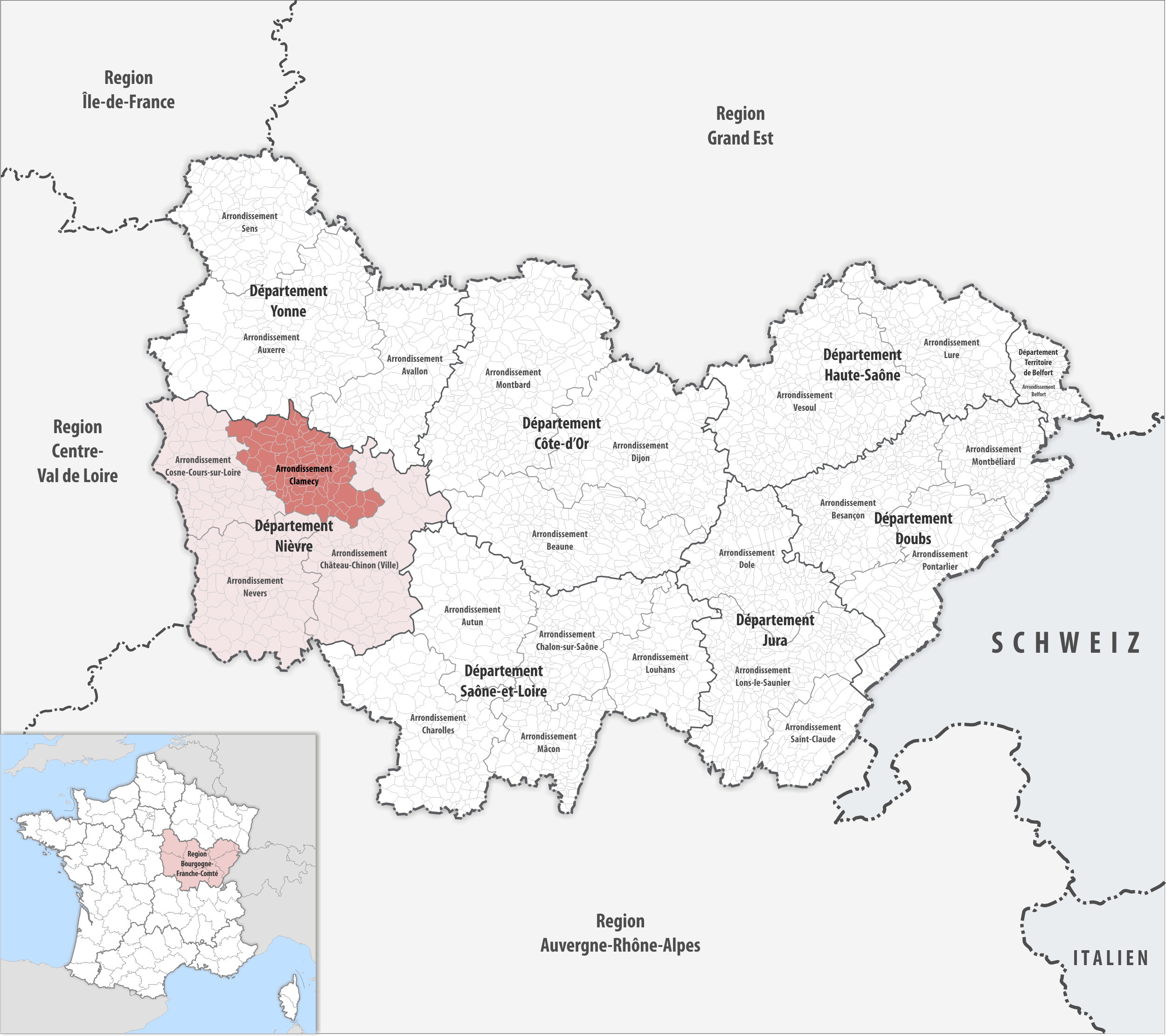
- Location within the region Bourgogne-Franche-Comté
- Country: France
- Region: Bourgogne-Franche-Comté
- Department: Nièvre
- No. of communes: {{{nbcomm}}}
- Area: 1,227.6 km^{2} (474.0 sq mi)
- Population (2023): 20,036
  - Density: 16.321/km^{2} (42.272/sq mi)
- INSEE code: 582

The arrondissement of Clamecy is an arrondissement of France in the Nièvre department in the Bourgogne-Franche-Comté region. It has 84 communes. Its population is 20,156 (2021), and its area is 1,227.6 km^{2} (474.0 sq mi).

== Composition ==
The communes of the arrondissement of Clamecy, and their INSEE codes, are:

1. Amazy (58005)
2. Anthien (58008)
3. Armes (58011)
4. Asnan (58015)
5. Asnois (58016)
6. Authiou (58018)
7. Beaulieu (58026)
8. Beuvron (58029)
9. Billy-sur-Oisy (58032)
10. Breugnon (58038)
11. Brèves (58039)
12. Brinon-sur-Beuvron (58041)
13. Bussy-la-Pesle (58043)
14. Cervon (58047)
15. Challement (58050)
16. Champallement (58052)
17. Champlin (58054)
18. La Chapelle-Saint-André (58058)
19. Chaumot (58069)
20. Chazeuil (58070)
21. Chevannes-Changy (58071)
22. Chevroches (58073)
23. Chitry-les-Mines (58075)
24. Clamecy (58079)
25. La Collancelle (58080)
26. Corbigny (58083)
27. Corvol-d'Embernard (58084)
28. Corvol-l'Orgueilleux (58085)
29. Courcelles (58090)
30. Cuncy-lès-Varzy (58093)
31. Dirol (58098)
32. Dornecy (58103)
33. Entrains-sur-Nohain (58109)
34. Epiry (58110)
35. Flez-Cuzy (58116)
36. Germenay (58123)
37. Grenois (58130)
38. Guipy (58132)
39. Gâcogne (58120)
40. Héry (58133)
41. Lys (58150)
42. Magny-Lormes (58153)
43. La Maison-Dieu (58154)
44. Marcy (58156)
45. Marigny-sur-Yonne (58159)
46. Menou (58163)
47. Metz-le-Comte (58165)
48. Mhère (58166)
49. Moissy-Moulinot (58169)
50. Monceaux-le-Comte (58170)
51. Montreuillon (58179)
52. Moraches (58181)
53. Mouron-sur-Yonne (58183)
54. Neuffontaines (58190)
55. Neuilly (58191)
56. Nuars (58197)
57. Oisy (58198)
58. Ouagne (58200)
59. Oudan (58201)
60. Parigny-la-Rose (58206)
61. Pazy (58208)
62. Pouques-Lormes (58216)
63. Pousseaux (58217)
64. Rix (58222)
65. Ruages (58224)
66. Saint-Aubin-des-Chaumes (58230)
67. Saint-Didier (58237)
68. Saint-Germain-des-Bois (58242)
69. Saint-Pierre-du-Mont (58263)
70. Saint-Révérien (58266)
71. Saizy (58271)
72. Sardy-lès-Épiry (58272)
73. Surgy (58282)
74. Taconnay (58283)
75. Talon (58284)
76. Tannay (58286)
77. Teigny (58288)
78. Trucy-l'Orgueilleux (58299)
79. Varzy (58304)
80. Vauclaix (58305)
81. Vignol (58308)
82. Villiers-le-Sec (58310)
83. Villiers-sur-Yonne (58312)
84. Vitry-Laché (58313)

== History ==
The arrondissement of Clamecy was created in 1800. At the January 2017 reorganisation of the arrondissements of Nièvre, it gained one commune from the arrondissement of Château-Chinon (Ville) and one commune from the arrondissement of Cosne-Cours-sur-Loire, and it lost nine communes to the arrondissement of Château-Chinon (Ville).

As a result of the reorganisation of the cantons of France which came into effect in 2015, the borders of the cantons are no longer related to the borders of the arrondissements. The cantons of the arrondissement of Clamecy were, as of January 2015:

1. Brinon-sur-Beuvron
2. Clamecy
3. Corbigny
4. Lormes
5. Tannay
6. Varzy
