= Nuars =

Commune in Bourgogne-Franche-Comté, France

- Commune
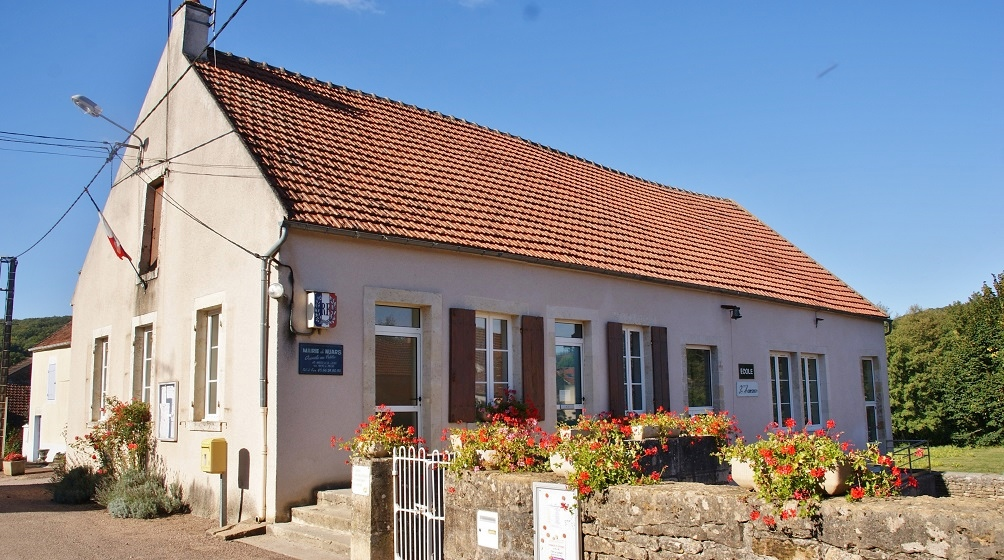
- Town hall
- Location of Nuars
- Location within France Location within Bourgogne-Franche-Comté
- Coordinates: 47°23′04″N 3°41′36″E
- Country: France
- Region: Bourgogne-Franche-Comté
- Department: Nièvre
- Arrondissement: Clamecy
- Canton: Clamecy
- Intercommunality: Tannay-Brinon-Corbigny

Government
  - Mayor (2020–2026): Christian Perreau
- Area^{1}: 15.60 km^{2} (6.02 sq mi)
- Highest elevation: 347 m (1,138 ft)
- Lowest elevation: 217 m (712 ft)
- Population (2023): 172
  - Density: 11.0/km^{2} (28.6/sq mi)
- Time zone: UTC+01:00 (CET)
  - Summer (DST): UTC+02:00 (CEST)
- INSEE/Postal code: 58197 /58190
- ^{1} French Land Register data, which excludes lakes, ponds, glaciers > 1 km^{2} (0.386 sq mi or 247 acres) and river estuaries.

Nuars (French pronunciation: [nɥaʁ]) is a commune in the Nièvre department in central France.

== See also ==
- Communes of the Nièvre department
