= Ouagne =

- Commune
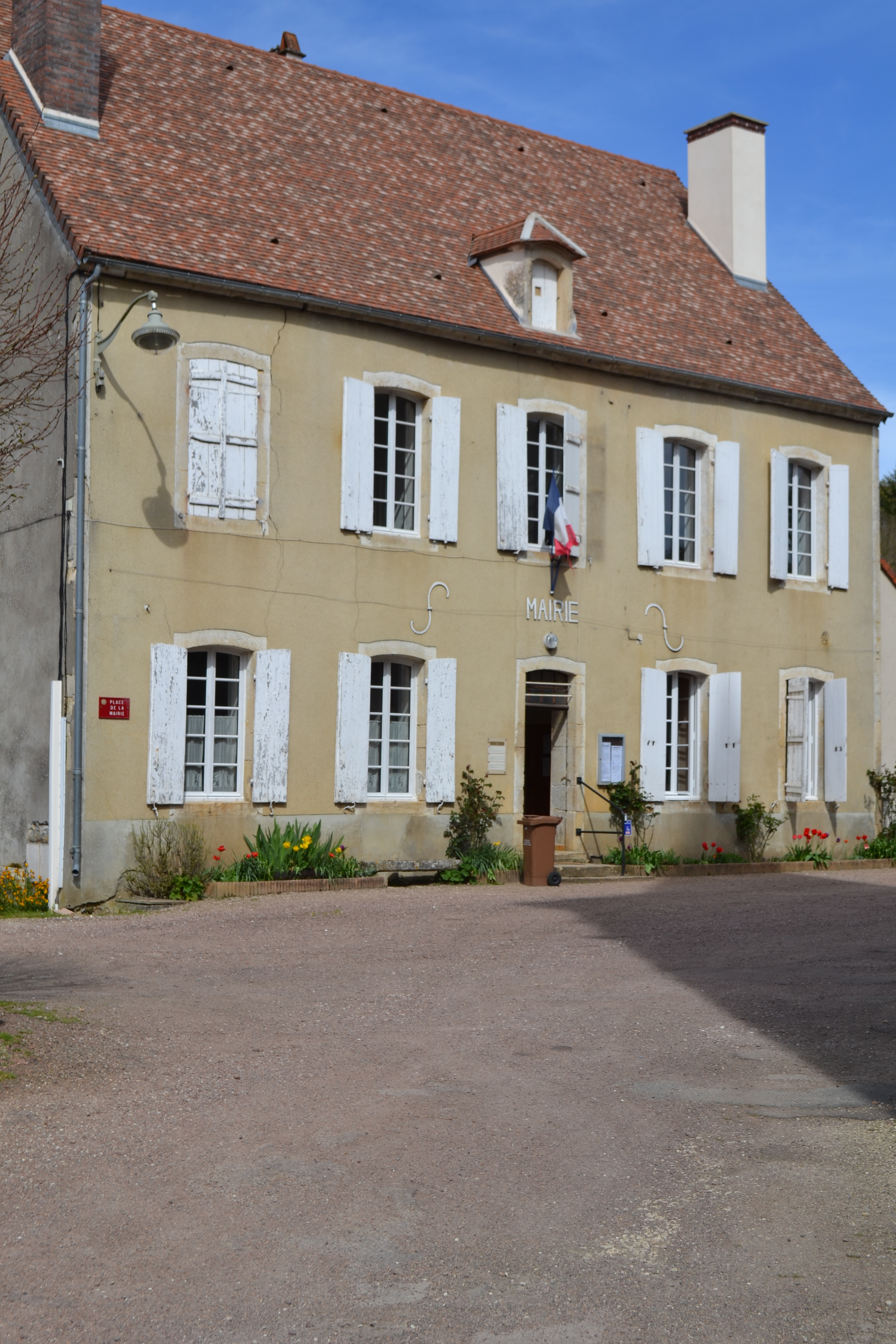
- Town hall
- Location of Ouagne
- Location within France Location within Bourgogne-Franche-Comté
- Coordinates: 47°23′53″N 3°29′45″E
- Country: France
- Region: Bourgogne-Franche-Comté
- Department: Nièvre
- Arrondissement: Clamecy
- Canton: Clamecy

Government
  - Mayor (2020–2026): Bruno Millière
- Area^{1}: 11.72 km^{2} (4.53 sq mi)
- Highest elevation: 235 m (771 ft)
- Lowest elevation: 157 m (515 ft)
- Population (2023): 149
  - Density: 12.7/km^{2} (32.9/sq mi)
- Time zone: UTC+01:00 (CET)
  - Summer (DST): UTC+02:00 (CEST)
- INSEE/Postal code: 58200 /58500
- ^{1} French Land Register data, which excludes lakes, ponds, glaciers > 1 km^{2} (0.386 sq mi or 247 acres) and river estuaries.

Ouagne (French pronunciation: [waɲ]) is a commune in the Nièvre department in central France.

== See also ==
- Communes of the Nièvre department
