= Corvol-l'Orgueilleux =

- Commune
- Coat of arms
- Location of Corvol-l'Orgueilleux
- Location within France Location within Bourgogne-Franche-Comté
- Coordinates: 47°26′00″N 3°24′30″E
- Country: France
- Region: Bourgogne-Franche-Comté
- Department: Nièvre
- Arrondissement: Clamecy
- Canton: Clamecy
- Intercommunality: Haut Nivernais-Val d'Yonne

Government
  - Mayor (2024–2026): Miguel De Aro Jarreau
- Area^{1}: 30.22 km^{2} (11.67 sq mi)
- Highest elevation: 297 m (974 ft)
- Lowest elevation: 166 m (545 ft)
- Population (2023): 721
  - Density: 23.9/km^{2} (61.8/sq mi)
- Time zone: UTC+01:00 (CET)
  - Summer (DST): UTC+02:00 (CEST)
- INSEE/Postal code: 58085 /58460
- ^{1} French Land Register data, which excludes lakes, ponds, glaciers > 1 km^{2} (0.386 sq mi or 247 acres) and river estuaries.

Corvol-l'Orgueilleux (French pronunciation: [kɔʁvɔl lɔʁɡœjø]) is a commune in the Nièvre department in central France. On 1 January 2022, the population was 725.

== See also ==
- Communes of the Nièvre department
