= Challement =

- Commune
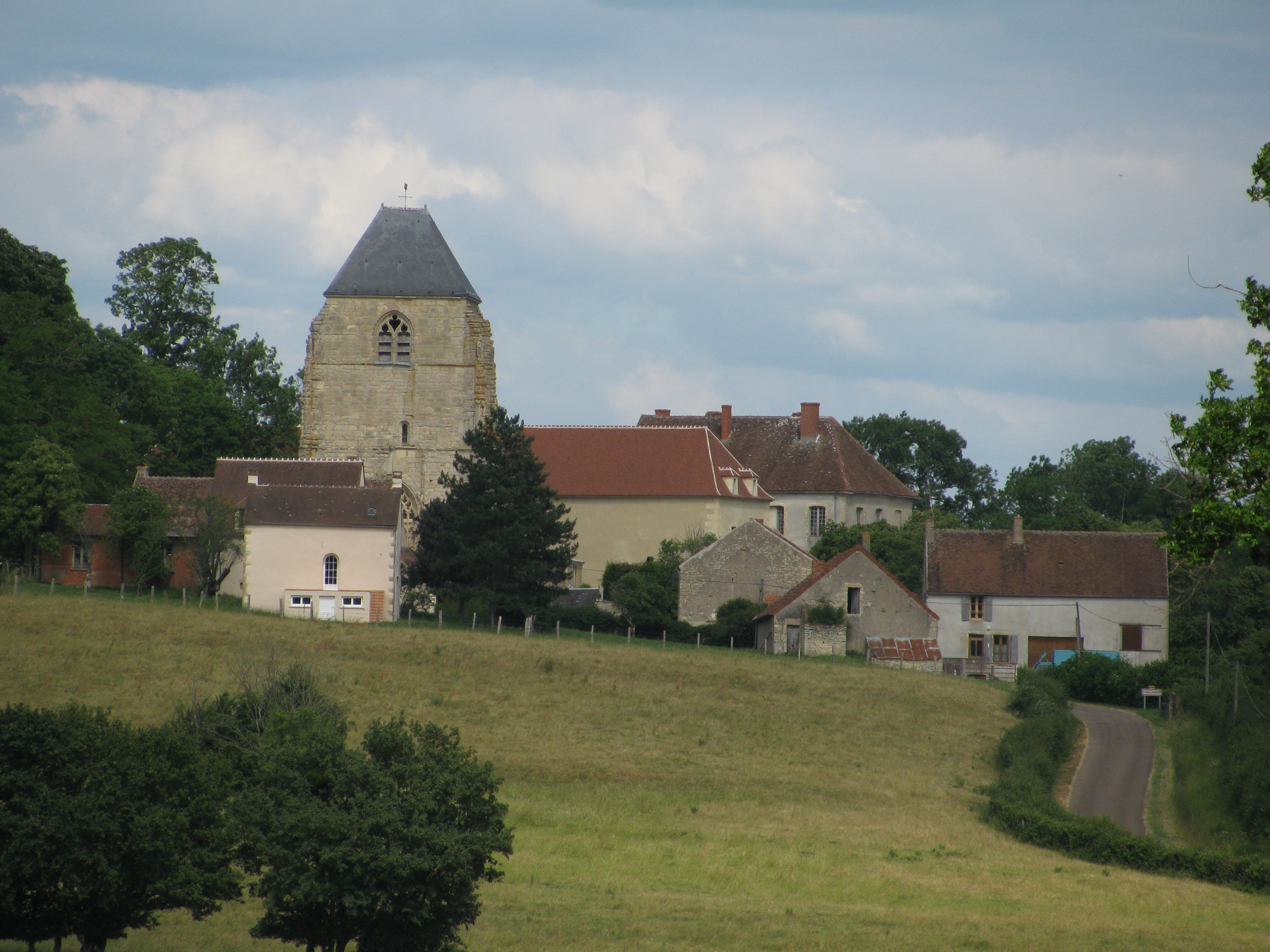
- The church and surrounding buildings in Challement
- Location of Challement
- Location within France Location within Bourgogne-Franche-Comté
- Coordinates: 47°18′56″N 3°35′19″E
- Country: France
- Region: Bourgogne-Franche-Comté
- Department: Nièvre
- Arrondissement: Clamecy
- Canton: Corbigny
- Intercommunality: Tannay-Brinon-Corbigny

Government
  - Mayor (2020–2026): Bruno Lalloz
- Area^{1}: 9.52 km^{2} (3.68 sq mi)
- Highest elevation: 317 m (1,040 ft)
- Lowest elevation: 174 m (571 ft)
- Population (2023): 45
  - Density: 4.7/km^{2} (12/sq mi)
- Time zone: UTC+01:00 (CET)
  - Summer (DST): UTC+02:00 (CEST)
- INSEE/Postal code: 58050 /58420
- ^{1} French Land Register data, which excludes lakes, ponds, glaciers > 1 km^{2} (0.386 sq mi or 247 acres) and river estuaries.

Challement (French pronunciation: [ʃalmɑ̃]) is a commune in the Nièvre department in central France.

== See also ==
- Communes of the Nièvre department
