= Mhère =

- Commune
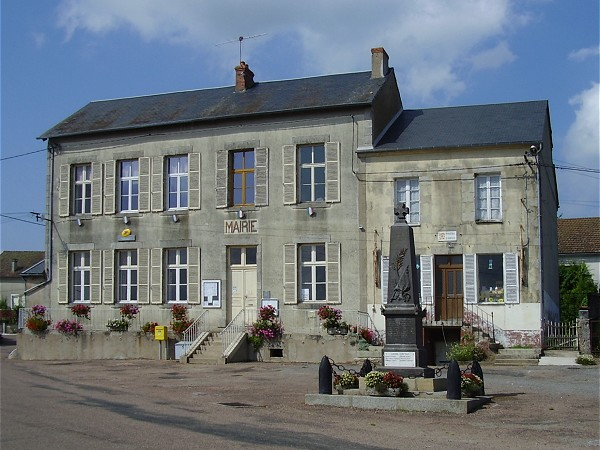
- The town hall in Mhère

- Coat of arms
- Location of Mhère
- Location within France Location within Bourgogne-Franche-Comté
- Coordinates: 47°12′29″N 3°51′24″E
- Country: France
- Region: Bourgogne-Franche-Comté
- Department: Nièvre
- Arrondissement: Clamecy
- Canton: Corbigny
- Intercommunality: Tannay-Brinon-Corbigny

Government
  - Mayor (2020–2026): Cyril Trinquet
- Area^{1}: 25.25 km^{2} (9.75 sq mi)
- Highest elevation: 550 m (1,800 ft)
- Lowest elevation: 255 m (837 ft)
- Population (2023): 226
  - Density: 8.95/km^{2} (23.2/sq mi)
- Time zone: UTC+01:00 (CET)
  - Summer (DST): UTC+02:00 (CEST)
- INSEE/Postal code: 58166 /58140
- ^{1} French Land Register data, which excludes lakes, ponds, glaciers > 1 km^{2} (0.386 sq mi or 247 acres) and river estuaries.

Mhère (French pronunciation: [mɛʁ]) is a commune in the Nièvre department in central France.

According to the Institut Géographique National, between 1 January 2007 and 1 January 2008, Mhère was the geographic centre of the Eurozone, after its enlargement to Slovenia. With the admission of Cyprus and Malta, this centre was moved to Ouroux-en-Morvan.

== Demographics ==
Historical population
Year	Pop.	±% p.a.
1968	404	—
1975	376	−1.02%
1982	341	−1.39%
1990	310	−1.18%
1999	279	−1.16%
2007	276	−0.14%
2012	245	−2.35%
2017	230	−1.26%
2023	226	−0.29%
Source: INSEE

== See also ==
- Communes of the Nièvre department
- Parc naturel régional du Morvan
