= Guipy =

- Commune
- Location of Guipy
- Location within France Location within Bourgogne-Franche-Comté
- Coordinates: 47°13′47″N 3°34′51″E
- Country: France
- Region: Bourgogne-Franche-Comté
- Department: Nièvre
- Arrondissement: Clamecy
- Canton: Corbigny

Government
  - Mayor (2020–2026): Christian Tourteauchaux
- Area^{1}: 18.36 km^{2} (7.09 sq mi)
- Highest elevation: 307 m (1,007 ft)
- Lowest elevation: 214 m (702 ft)
- Population (2023): 222
  - Density: 12.1/km^{2} (31.3/sq mi)
- Time zone: UTC+01:00 (CET)
  - Summer (DST): UTC+02:00 (CEST)
- INSEE/Postal code: 58132 /58420
- ^{1} French Land Register data, which excludes lakes, ponds, glaciers > 1 km^{2} (0.386 sq mi or 247 acres) and river estuaries.

Guipy (French pronunciation: [ɡipi]) is a commune in the Nièvre department in central France.

== See also ==
- Communes of the Nièvre department
