= Neuilly, Nièvre =

Neuilly
- Commune
- Location of Neuilly
- Location within France Location within Bourgogne-Franche-Comté
- Coordinates: 47°14′26″N 3°30′13″E
- Country: France
- Region: Bourgogne-Franche-Comté
- Department: Nièvre
- Arrondissement: Clamecy
- Canton: Corbigny
- Intercommunality: Tannay-Brinon-Corbigny

Government
  - Mayor (2020–2026): Marie-Françoise Henneaux
- Area^{1}: 13.92 km^{2} (5.37 sq mi)
- Highest elevation: 337 m (1,106 ft)
- Lowest elevation: 209 m (686 ft)
- Population (2023): 107
  - Density: 7.69/km^{2} (19.9/sq mi)
- Time zone: UTC+01:00 (CET)
  - Summer (DST): UTC+02:00 (CEST)
- INSEE/Postal code: 58191 /58420
- ^{1} French Land Register data, which excludes lakes, ponds, glaciers > 1 km^{2} (0.386 sq mi or 247 acres) and river estuaries.

Neuilly (French pronunciation: [nœji]) is a commune in the Nièvre department in central France.

== See also ==
- Communes of the Nièvre department
