= Germenay =

- Commune
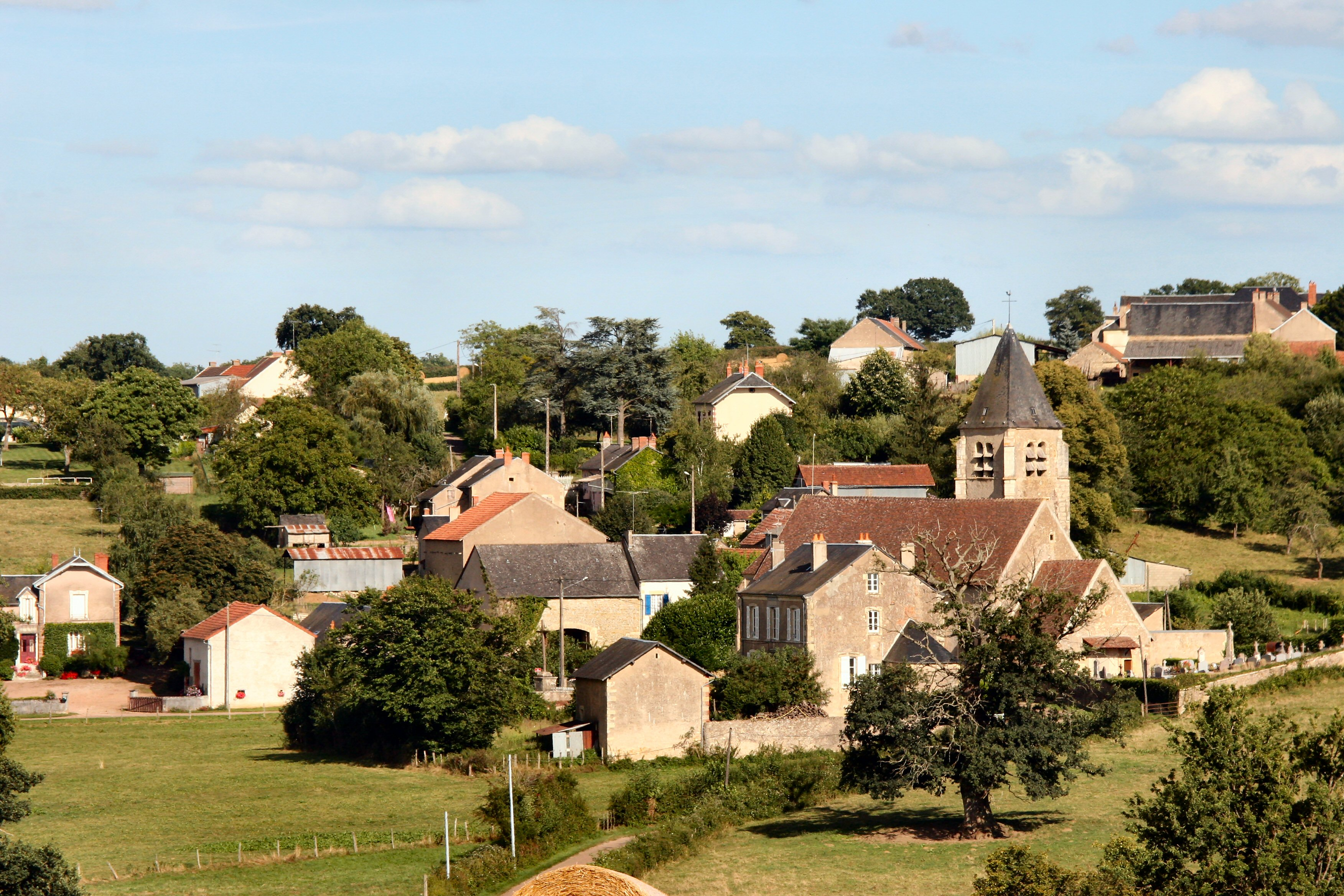
- The church and surrounding buildings in Germenay
- Location of Germenay
- Location within France Location within Bourgogne-Franche-Comté
- Coordinates: 47°16′59″N 3°35′47″E
- Country: France
- Region: Bourgogne-Franche-Comté
- Department: Nièvre
- Arrondissement: Clamecy
- Canton: Corbigny

Government
  - Mayor (2020–2026): Didier Tardivon
- Area^{1}: 12.91 km^{2} (4.98 sq mi)
- Highest elevation: 286 m (938 ft)
- Lowest elevation: 180 m (590 ft)
- Population (2023): 118
  - Density: 9.14/km^{2} (23.7/sq mi)
- Time zone: UTC+01:00 (CET)
  - Summer (DST): UTC+02:00 (CEST)
- INSEE/Postal code: 58123 /58800
- ^{1} French Land Register data, which excludes lakes, ponds, glaciers > 1 km^{2} (0.386 sq mi or 247 acres) and river estuaries.

Germenay (French pronunciation: [ʒɛʁmənɛ]) is a commune in the Nièvre department in central France.

== See also ==
- Communes of the Nièvre department
