= La Chapelle-Saint-André =

- Commune
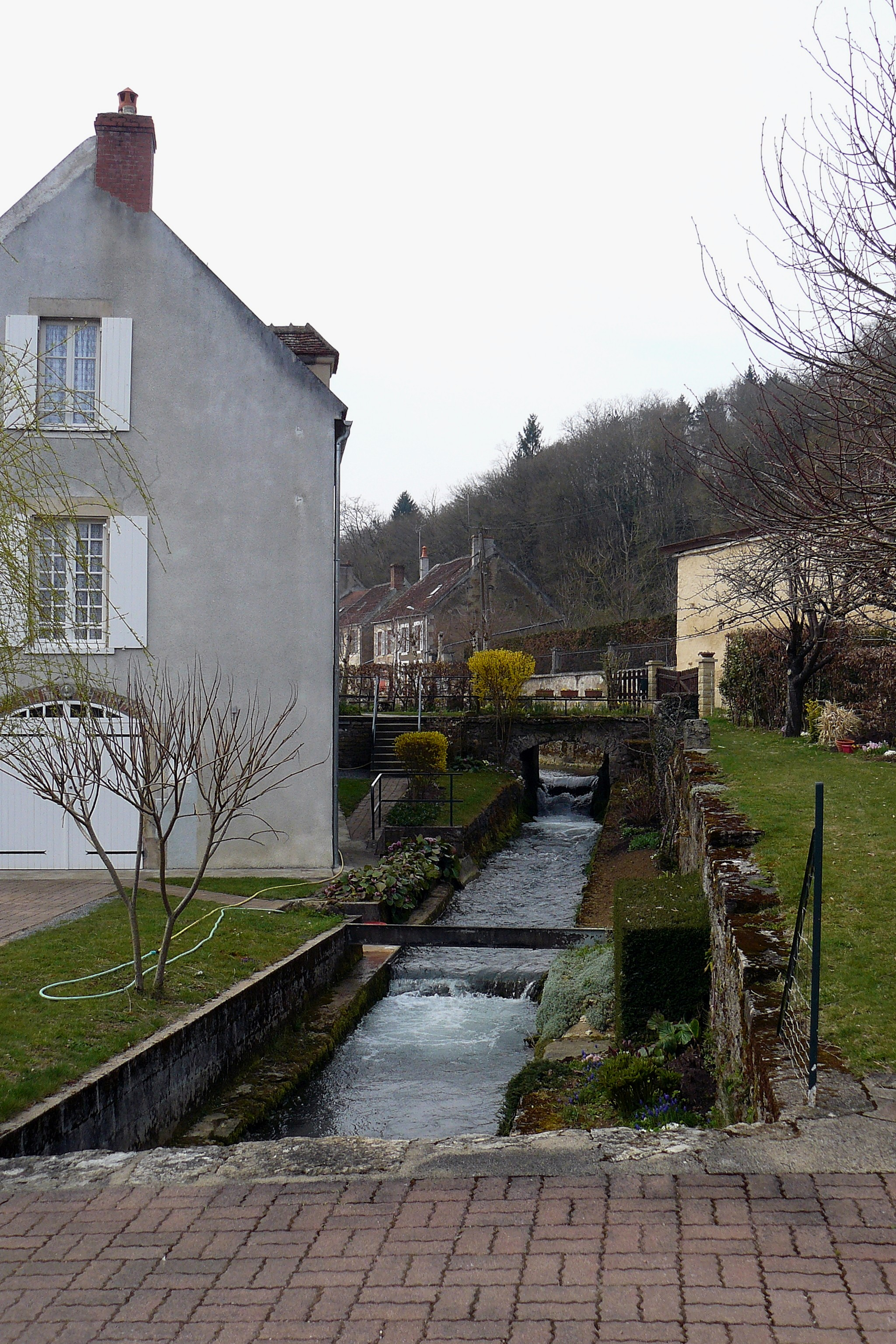
- The Sauzay river, at La Chapelle-Saint-André

- Coat of arms
- Location of La Chapelle-Saint-André
- Location within France Location within Bourgogne-Franche-Comté
- Coordinates: 47°23′42″N 3°20′43″E
- Country: France
- Region: Bourgogne-Franche-Comté
- Department: Nièvre
- Arrondissement: Clamecy
- Canton: Clamecy
- Intercommunality: Haut Nivernais-Val d'Yonne

Government
  - Mayor (2020–2026): Janny Siméon
- Area^{1}: 27.15 km^{2} (10.48 sq mi)
- Highest elevation: 310 m (1,020 ft)
- Lowest elevation: 195 m (640 ft)
- Population (2023): 313
  - Density: 11.5/km^{2} (29.9/sq mi)
- Time zone: UTC+01:00 (CET)
  - Summer (DST): UTC+02:00 (CEST)
- INSEE/Postal code: 58058 /58210
- ^{1} French Land Register data, which excludes lakes, ponds, glaciers > 1 km^{2} (0.386 sq mi or 247 acres) and river estuaries.

La Chapelle-Saint-André (French pronunciation: [la ʃapɛl sɛ̃.t‿ɑ̃dʁe]) is a commune in the Nièvre department in central France.

== See also ==
- Communes of the Nièvre department
