= Parigny-la-Rose =

- Commune
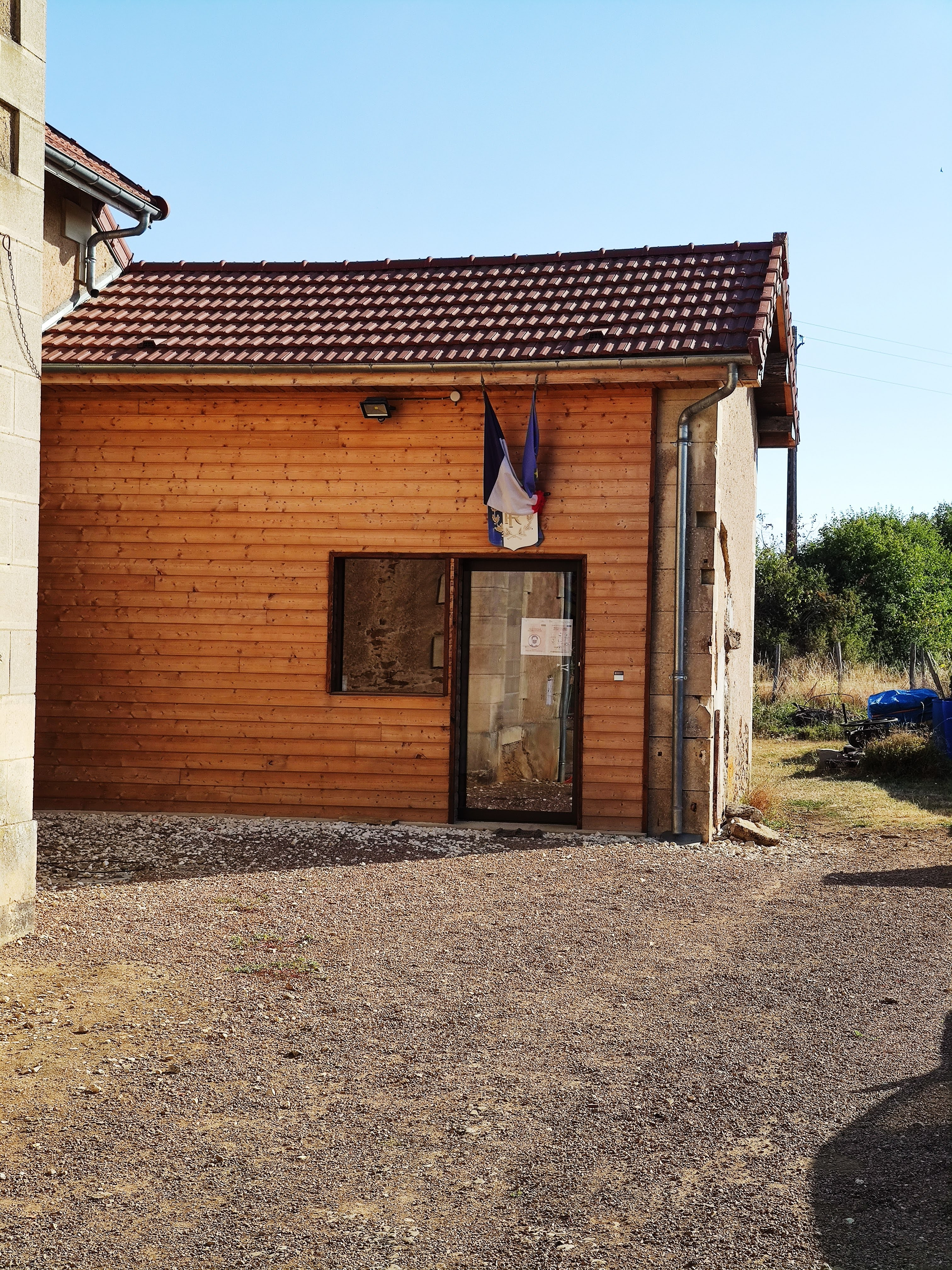
- Parigny-la-Rose Town hall
- Location of Parigny-la-Rose
- Location within France Location within Bourgogne-Franche-Comté
- Coordinates: 47°19′43″N 3°26′36″E
- Country: France
- Region: Bourgogne-Franche-Comté
- Department: Nièvre
- Arrondissement: Clamecy
- Canton: Clamecy

Government
  - Mayor (2020–2026): Charles Van Belleghem
- Area^{1}: 8.77 km^{2} (3.39 sq mi)
- Highest elevation: 285 m (935 ft)
- Lowest elevation: 190 m (620 ft)
- Population (2023): 32
  - Density: 3.6/km^{2} (9.5/sq mi)
- Time zone: UTC+01:00 (CET)
  - Summer (DST): UTC+02:00 (CEST)
- INSEE/Postal code: 58206 /58210
- ^{1} French Land Register data, which excludes lakes, ponds, glaciers > 1 km^{2} (0.386 sq mi or 247 acres) and river estuaries.

Parigny-la-Rose (French pronunciation: [paʁiɲi la ʁoz]) is a commune in the Nièvre department in central France.

== See also ==
- Communes of the Nièvre department
