= Grenois =

- Commune
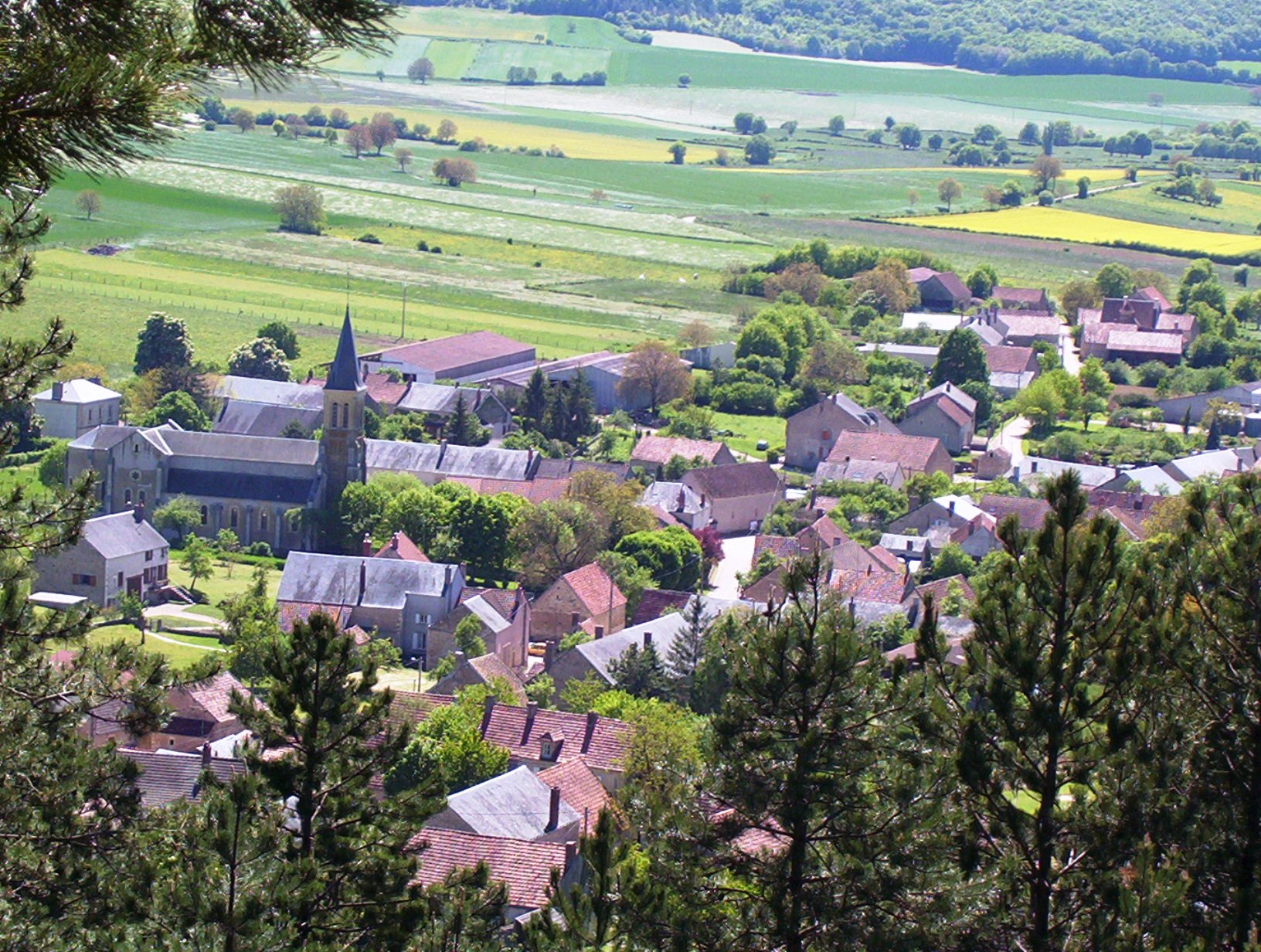
- The church and surrounding buildings in Grenois
- Location of Grenois
- Location within France Location within Bourgogne-Franche-Comté
- Coordinates: 47°19′17″N 3°31′41″E
- Country: France
- Region: Bourgogne-Franche-Comté
- Department: Nièvre
- Arrondissement: Clamecy
- Canton: Corbigny
- Intercommunality: Tannay-Brinon-Corbigny

Government
  - Mayor (2020–2026): Marie-Odile Pataut
- Area^{1}: 14.50 km^{2} (5.60 sq mi)
- Highest elevation: 387 m (1,270 ft)
- Lowest elevation: 198 m (650 ft)
- Population (2023): 93
  - Density: 6.4/km^{2} (17/sq mi)
- Time zone: UTC+01:00 (CET)
  - Summer (DST): UTC+02:00 (CEST)
- INSEE/Postal code: 58130 /58420
- ^{1} French Land Register data, which excludes lakes, ponds, glaciers > 1 km^{2} (0.386 sq mi or 247 acres) and river estuaries.

Grenois (French pronunciation: [ɡʁənwa]) is a commune in the Nièvre department in central France.

== See also ==
- Communes of the Nièvre department
