= Communes of the Nièvre department =

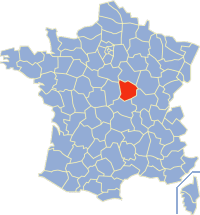

The following is a list of the 309 communes of the Nièvre department of France.

The communes cooperate in the following intercommunalities (as of 2025):

- Communauté d'agglomération Moulins Communauté (partly)
- Communauté d'agglomération de Nevers
- Communauté de communes Amognes Cœur du Nivernais
- Communauté de communes Bazois Loire Morvan
- Communauté de communes Les Bertranges (partly)
- Communauté de communes Cœur de Loire
- Communauté de communes Haut Nivernais-Val d'Yonne (partly)
- Communauté de communes Loire et Allier
- Communauté de communes Morvan Sommets et Grands Lacs
- Communauté de communes du Nivernais Bourbonnais
- Communauté de communes de Puisaye-Forterre (partly)
- Communauté de communes Sud Nivernais
- Communauté de communes Tannay-Brinon-Corbigny

INSEE code	Postal code	Commune
58001	58110	Achun
58002	58200	Alligny-Cosne
58003	58230	Alligny-en-Morvan
58004	58110	Alluy
58005	58190	Amazy
58006	58270	Anlezy
58007	58450	Annay
58008	58800	Anthien
58009	58350	Arbourse
58010	58430	Arleuf
58011	58500	Armes
58012	58310	Arquian
58013	58700	Arthel
58014	58700	Arzembouy
58015	58420	Asnan
58016	58190	Asnois
58017	58110	Aunay-en-Bazois
58018	58700	Authiou
58019	58170	Avrée
58020	58300	Avril-sur-Loire
58021	58240	Azy-le-Vif
58023	58190	Bazoches
58024	58110	Bazolles
58025	58160	Béard
58026	58420	Beaulieu
58027	58700	Beaumont-la-Ferrière
58028	58270	Beaumont-Sardolles
58029	58210	Beuvron
58030	58110	Biches
58031	58270	Billy-Chevannes
58032	58500	Billy-sur-Oisy
58033	58310	Bitry
58034	58120	Blismes
58035	58330	Bona
58036	58310	Bouhy
58037	58140	Brassy
58038	58460	Breugnon
58039	58530	Brèves
58040	58110	Brinay
58041	58420	Brinon-sur-Beuvron
58042	58400	Bulcy
58043	58420	Bussy-la-Pesle
58044	58440	La Celle-sur-Loire
58045	58700	La Celle-sur-Nièvre
58046	58340	Cercy-la-Tour
58047	58800	Cervon
58048	58220	Cessy-les-Bois
58049	58140	Chalaux
58050	58420	Challement
58051	58000	Challuy
58052	58420	Champallement
58053	58210	Champlemy
58054	58700	Champlin
58055	58300	Champvert
58056	58400	Champvoux
58057	58240	Chantenay-Saint-Imbert
58058	58210	La Chapelle-Saint-André
58059	58400	La Charité-sur-Loire
58060	58300	Charrin
58061	58350	Chasnay
58063	58120	Château-Chinon (Campagne)
58062	58120	Château-Chinon (Ville)
58064	58350	Châteauneuf-Val-de-Bargis
58065	58110	Châtillon-en-Bazois
58066	58120	Châtin
58067	58400	Chaulgnes
58068	58120	Chaumard
58069	58800	Chaumot
58070	58700	Chazeuil
58071	58420	Chevannes-Changy
58072	58160	Chevenon
58073	58500	Chevroches
58074	58170	Chiddes
58075	58800	Chitry-les-Mines
58076	58110	Chougny
58077	58220	Ciez
58078	58270	Cizely
58079	58500	Clamecy
58080	58800	La Collancelle
58081	58350	Colméry
58082	58120	Corancy
58083	58800	Corbigny
58084	58210	Corvol-d'Embernard
58085	58460	Corvol-l'Orgueilleux
58086	58200	Cosne-Cours-sur-Loire
58087	58300	Cossaye
58088	58660	Coulanges-lès-Nevers
58089	58220	Couloutre
58090	58210	Courcelles
58092	58330	Crux-la-Ville
58093	58210	Cuncy-lès-Varzy
58094	58310	Dampierre-sous-Bouhy
58095	58300	Decize
58096	58300	Devay
58097	58340	Diennes-Aubigny
58098	58190	Dirol
58099	58120	Dommartin
58101	58350	Dompierre-sur-Nièvre
58102	58220	Donzy
58103	58530	Dornecy
58104	58390	Dornes
58105	58160	Druy-Parigny
58106	58230	Dun-les-Places
58107	58110	Dun-sur-Grandry
58108	58140	Empury
58109	58410	Entrains-sur-Nohain
58110	58800	Epiry
58111	58430	Fâchin
58112	58160	La Fermeté
58113	58270	Fertrève
58114	58170	Fléty
58115	58240	Fleury-sur-Loire
58116	58190	Flez-Cuzy
58117	58600	Fourchambault
58118	58250	Fours
58119	58270	Frasnay-Reugny
58120	58140	Gâcogne
58121	58600	Garchizy
58122	58150	Garchy
58123	58800	Germenay
58124	58320	Germigny-sur-Loire
58125	58230	Gien-sur-Cure
58126	58470	Gimouille
58127	58700	Giry
58128	58370	Glux-en-Glenne
58129	58230	Gouloux
58130	58420	Grenois
58131	58130	Guérigny
58132	58420	Guipy
58133	58800	Héry
58134	58160	Imphy
58135	58290	Isenay
58136	58330	Jailly
58137	58300	Lamenay-sur-Loire
58138	58240	Langeron
58139	58250	Lanty
58140	58370	Larochemillay
58141	58230	Lavault-de-Frétoy
58142	58290	Limanton
58143	58270	Limon
58144	58240	Livry
58145	58140	Lormes
58146	58380	Lucenay-lès-Aix
58147	58700	Lurcy-le-Bourg
58148	58240	Luthenay-Uxeloup
58149	58170	Luzy
58150	58190	Lys
58151	58260	La Machine
58152	58470	Magny-Cours
58153	58800	Magny-Lormes
58154	58190	La Maison-Dieu
58155	58400	La Marche
58156	58210	Marcy
58157	58140	Marigny-l'Église
58159	58800	Marigny-sur-Yonne
58158	58240	Mars-sur-Allier

INSEE code	Postal code	Commune
58160	58180	Marzy
58161	58290	Maux
58162	58410	Menestreau
58163	58210	Menou
58164	58400	Mesves-sur-Loire
58165	58190	Metz-le-Comte
58166	58140	Mhère
58168	58170	Millay
58169	58190	Moissy-Moulinot
58170	58190	Monceaux-le-Comte
58172	58250	Montambert
58171	58110	Montapas
58173	58250	Montaron
58174	58700	Montenoison
58175	58110	Mont-et-Marré
58176	58130	Montigny-aux-Amognes
58177	58120	Montigny-en-Morvan
58178	58340	Montigny-sur-Canne
58179	58800	Montreuillon
58180	58230	Montsauche-les-Settons
58181	58420	Moraches
58182	58290	Moulins-Engilbert
58183	58800	Mouron-sur-Yonne
58184	58700	Moussy
58185	58230	Moux-en-Morvan
58186	58700	Murlin
58187	58440	Myennes
58188	58350	Nannay
58189	58400	Narcy
58190	58190	Neuffontaines
58191	58420	Neuilly
58192	58300	Neuville-lès-Decize
58193	58450	Neuvy-sur-Loire
58194	58000	Nevers
58195	58250	La Nocle-Maulaix
58196	58700	Nolay
58197	58190	Nuars
58198	58500	Oisy
58199	58370	Onlay
58200	58500	Ouagne
58201	58210	Oudan
58202	58110	Ougny
58203	58700	Oulon
58205	58230	Ouroux-en-Morvan
58206	58210	Parigny-la-Rose
58207	58320	Parigny-les-Vaux
58208	58800	Pazy
58209	58220	Perroy
58210	58230	Planchez
58211	58170	Poil
58212	58130	Poiseux
58213	58200	Pougny
58214	58320	Pougues-les-Eaux
58215	58150	Pouilly-sur-Loire
58216	58140	Pouques-Lormes
58217	58500	Pousseaux
58218	58700	Prémery
58219	58360	Préporché
58220	58400	Raveau
58221	58250	Rémilly
58222	58500	Rix
58223	58110	Rouy
58224	58190	Ruages
58225	58470	Saincaize-Meauce
58226	58230	Saint-Agnan
58227	58310	Saint-Amand-en-Puisaye
58228	58150	Saint-Andelain
58229	58140	Saint-André-en-Morvan
58230	58190	Saint-Aubin-des-Chaumes
58231	58130	Saint-Aubin-les-Forges
58232	58270	Saint-Benin-d'Azy
58233	58330	Saint-Benin-des-Bois
58234	58700	Saint-Bonnot
58235	58230	Saint-Brisson
58237	58190	Saint-Didier
58236	58220	Sainte-Colombe-des-Bois
58238	58000	Saint-Éloi
58253	58330	Sainte-Marie
58239	58270	Saint-Firmin
58240	58330	Saint-Franchy
58241	58300	Saint-Germain-Chassenay
58242	58210	Saint-Germain-des-Bois
58243	58340	Saint-Gratien-Savigny
58244	58120	Saint-Hilaire-en-Morvan
58245	58300	Saint-Hilaire-Fontaine
58246	58360	Saint-Honoré-les-Bains
58247	58270	Saint-Jean-aux-Amognes
58248	58150	Saint-Laurent-l'Abbaye
58249	58120	Saint-Léger-de-Fougeret
58250	58300	Saint-Léger-des-Vignes
58251	58200	Saint-Loup-des-Bois
58252	58350	Saint-Malo-en-Donziois
58254	58130	Saint-Martin-d'Heuille
58255	58140	Saint-Martin-du-Puy
58256	58150	Saint-Martin-sur-Nohain
58257	58330	Saint-Maurice
58258	58160	Saint-Ouen-sur-Loire
58259	58300	Saint-Parize-en-Viry
58260	58490	Saint-Parize-le-Châtel
58261	58200	Saint-Père
58262	58110	Saint-Péreuse
58263	58210	Saint-Pierre-du-Mont
58264	58240	Saint-Pierre-le-Moûtier
58265	58150	Saint-Quentin-sur-Nohain
58266	58420	Saint-Révérien
58267	58330	Saint-Saulge
58268	58250	Saint-Seine
58269	58270	Saint-Sulpice
58270	58310	Saint-Vérain
58271	58190	Saizy
58272	58800	Sardy-lès-Épiry
58273	58160	Sauvigny-les-Bois
58274	58170	Savigny-Poil-Fol
58275	58330	Saxi-Bourdon
58276	58360	Sémelay
58277	58290	Sermages
58278	58000	Sermoise-sur-Loire
58279	58700	Sichamps
58280	58300	Sougy-sur-Loire
58281	58150	Suilly-la-Tour
58282	58500	Surgy
58283	58420	Taconnay
58284	58190	Talon
58285	58110	Tamnay-en-Bazois
58286	58190	Tannay
58287	58170	Tazilly
58288	58190	Teigny
58289	58250	Ternant
58290	58250	Thaix
58291	58260	Thianges
58292	58110	Tintury
58293	58300	Toury-Lurcy
58294	58240	Toury-sur-Jour
58295	58150	Tracy-sur-Loire
58296	58240	Tresnay
58297	58260	Trois-Vèvres
58298	58400	Tronsanges
58299	58460	Trucy-l'Orgueilleux
58300	58130	Urzy
58301	58290	Vandenesse
58302	58400	Varennes-lès-Narcy
58303	58640	Varennes-Vauzelles
58304	58210	Varzy
58305	58140	Vauclaix
58204	58130	Vaux d'Amognes
58306	58300	Verneuil
58307	58150	Vielmanay
58308	58190	Vignol
58309	58370	Villapourçon
58311	58270	Ville-Langy
58310	58210	Villiers-le-Sec
58312	58500	Villiers-sur-Yonne
58313	58420	Vitry-Laché
