= Breugnon =

- Commune
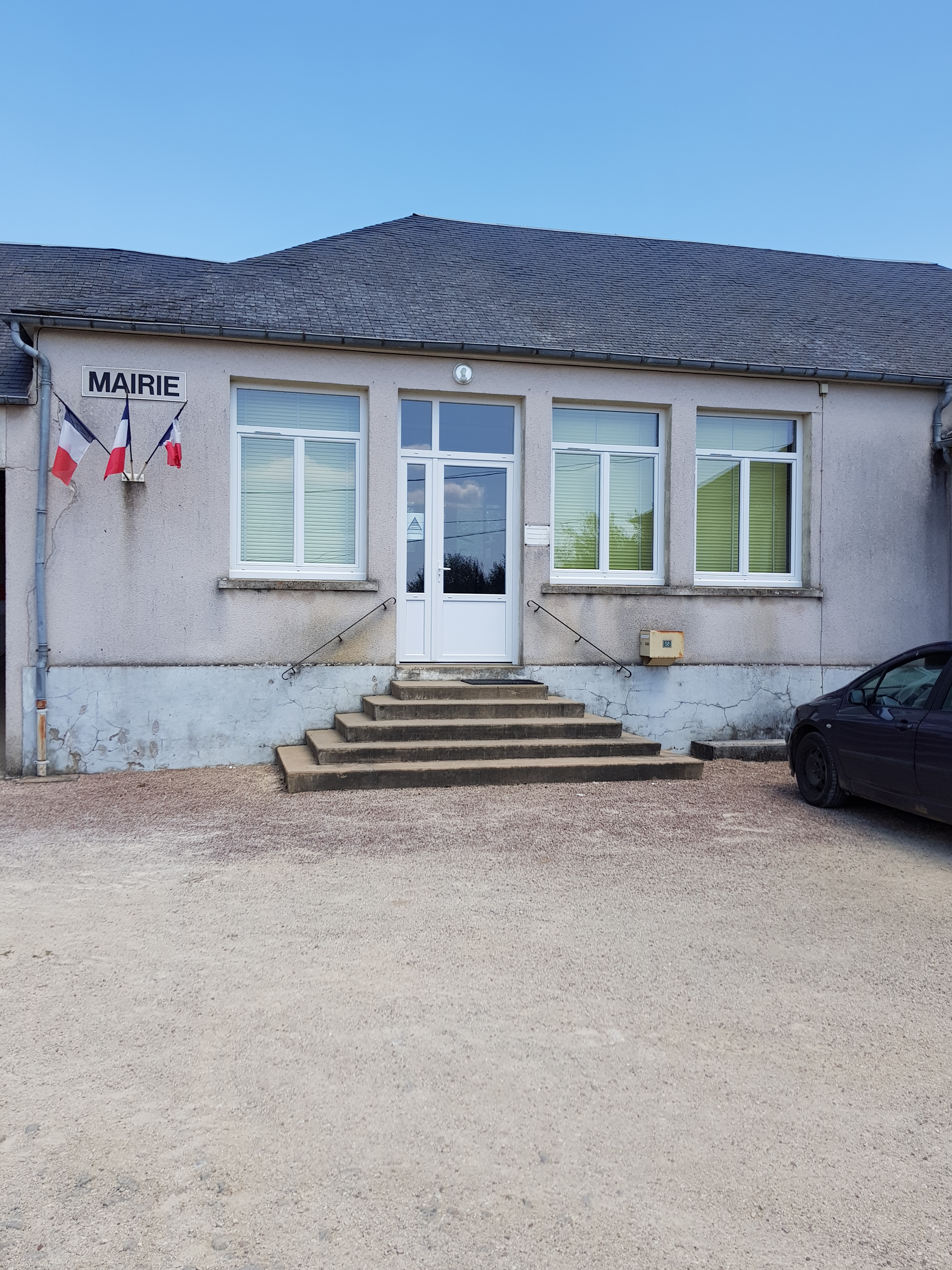
- Town hall
- Location of Breugnon
- Location within France Location within Bourgogne-Franche-Comté
- Coordinates: 47°25′45″N 3°27′11″E
- Country: France
- Region: Bourgogne-Franche-Comté
- Department: Nièvre
- Arrondissement: Clamecy
- Canton: Clamecy
- Intercommunality: Haut Nivernais-Val d'Yonne

Government
  - Mayor (2020–2026): Sébastien Reverdy
- Area^{1}: 13.35 km^{2} (5.15 sq mi)
- Highest elevation: 240 m (790 ft)
- Lowest elevation: 163 m (535 ft)
- Population (2023): 153
  - Density: 11.5/km^{2} (29.7/sq mi)
- Time zone: UTC+01:00 (CET)
  - Summer (DST): UTC+02:00 (CEST)
- INSEE/Postal code: 58038 /58460
- ^{1} French Land Register data, which excludes lakes, ponds, glaciers > 1 km^{2} (0.386 sq mi or 247 acres) and river estuaries.

Breugnon (French pronunciation: [bʁœɲɔ̃]) is a commune in the Nièvre department in central France.

== Population ==
Historical population
Year	Pop.	±% p.a.
1968	197	—
1975	200	+0.22%
1982	180	−1.49%
1990	168	−0.86%
1999	157	−0.75%
2007	167	+0.77%
2012	175	+0.94%
2017	169	−0.70%
2023	153	−1.64%
Source: INSEE

== See also ==
- Communes of the Nièvre department
