= Héry, Nièvre =

Héry
- Commune
- Location of Héry
- Location within France Location within Bourgogne-Franche-Comté
- Coordinates: 47°15′50″N 3°34′54″E
- Country: France
- Region: Bourgogne-Franche-Comté
- Department: Nièvre
- Arrondissement: Clamecy
- Canton: Corbigny
- Intercommunality: Tannay-Brinon-Corbigny

Government
  - Mayor (2020–2026): Emmanuel Tardivon
- Area^{1}: 7.72 km^{2} (2.98 sq mi)
- Highest elevation: 321 m (1,053 ft)
- Lowest elevation: 214 m (702 ft)
- Population (2023): 72
  - Density: 9.3/km^{2} (24/sq mi)
- Time zone: UTC+01:00 (CET)
  - Summer (DST): UTC+02:00 (CEST)
- INSEE/Postal code: 58133 /58800
- ^{1} French Land Register data, which excludes lakes, ponds, glaciers > 1 km^{2} (0.386 sq mi or 247 acres) and river estuaries.

Héry (French pronunciation: [eʁi]) is a commune in the Nièvre department in central France.

== Demographics ==
Historical population
Year	Pop.	±% p.a.
1968	108	—
1975	97	−1.52%
1982	69	−4.75%
1990	63	−1.13%
1999	68	+0.85%
2007	73	+0.89%
2012	64	−2.60%
2017	74	+2.95%
2023	72	−0.46%
Source: INSEE

== See also ==
- Communes of the Nièvre department
