= Corvol-d'Embernard =

French commune

- Commune
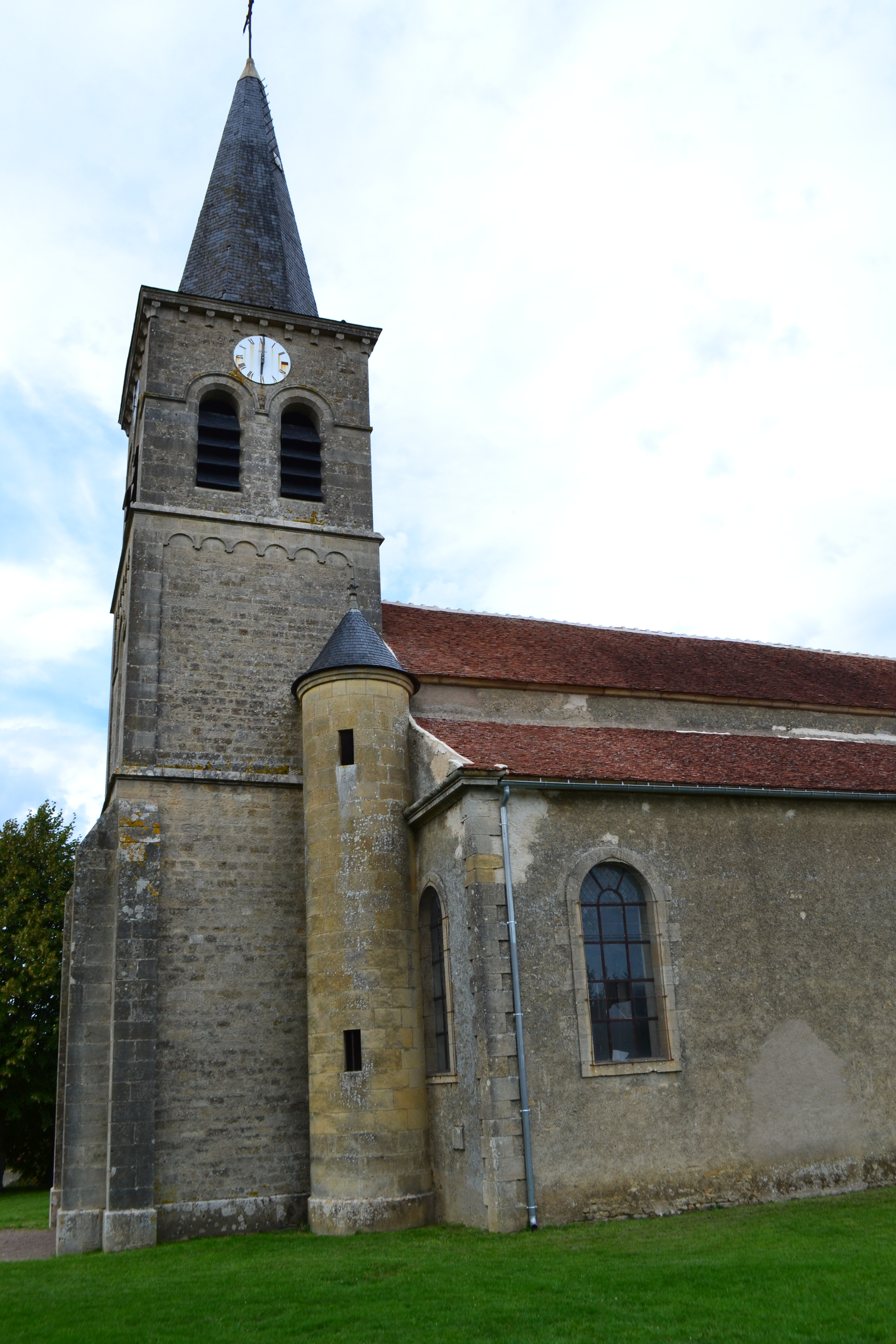
- The church in Corvol-d'Embernard
- Location of Corvol-d'Embernard
- Location within France Location within Bourgogne-Franche-Comté
- Coordinates: 47°17′42″N 3°23′55″E
- Country: France
- Region: Bourgogne-Franche-Comté
- Department: Nièvre
- Arrondissement: Clamecy
- Canton: Corbigny
- Intercommunality: Tannay-Brinon-Corbigny

Government
  - Mayor (2020–2026): Stéphane Delesmillieres
- Area^{1}: 9.86 km^{2} (3.81 sq mi)
- Highest elevation: 384 m (1,260 ft)
- Lowest elevation: 223 m (732 ft)
- Population (2023): 117
  - Density: 11.9/km^{2} (30.7/sq mi)
- Time zone: UTC+01:00 (CET)
  - Summer (DST): UTC+02:00 (CEST)
- INSEE/Postal code: 58084 /58210
- ^{1} French Land Register data, which excludes lakes, ponds, glaciers > 1 km^{2} (0.386 sq mi or 247 acres) and river estuaries.

Corvol-d'Embernard (French pronunciation: [kɔʁvɔl dɑ̃bɛʁnaʁ]) is a commune in the Nièvre department in central France.

== See also ==
- Communes of the Nièvre department
