= Bussy-la-Pesle, Nièvre =

Bussy-la-Pesle
- Commune
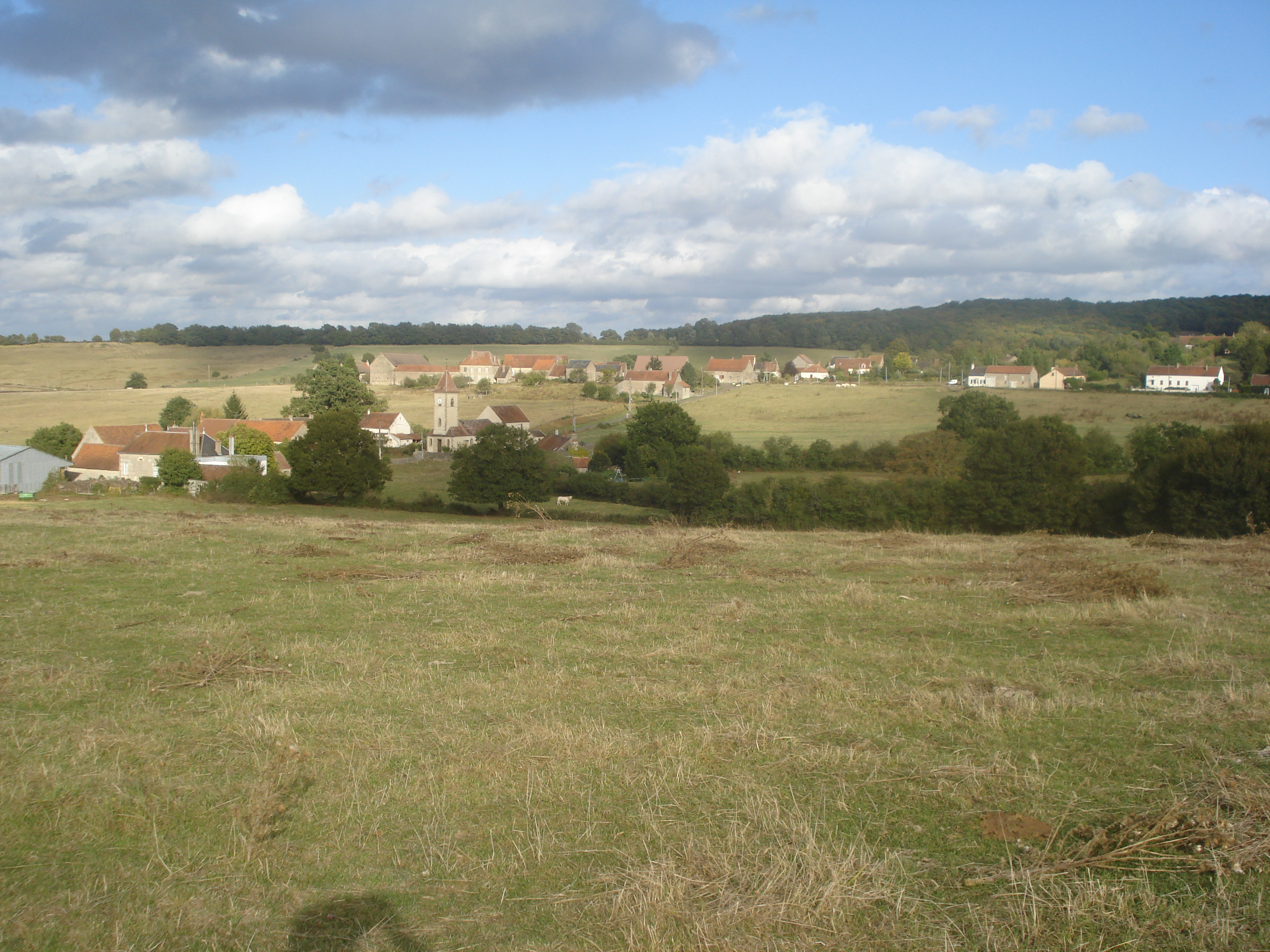
- A general view of Bussy-la-Pesle
- Location of Bussy-la-Pesle
- Location within France Location within Bourgogne-Franche-Comté
- Coordinates: 47°15′56″N 3°28′31″E
- Country: France
- Region: Bourgogne-Franche-Comté
- Department: Nièvre
- Arrondissement: Clamecy
- Canton: Corbigny

Government
  - Mayor (2020–2026): Philippe Raffeau
- Area^{1}: 5.15 km^{2} (1.99 sq mi)
- Highest elevation: 210 m (690 ft)
- Lowest elevation: 219 m (719 ft)
- Population (2023): 50
  - Density: 9.7/km^{2} (25/sq mi)
- Time zone: UTC+01:00 (CET)
  - Summer (DST): UTC+02:00 (CEST)
- INSEE/Postal code: 58043 /58420
- ^{1} French Land Register data, which excludes lakes, ponds, glaciers > 1 km^{2} (0.386 sq mi or 247 acres) and river estuaries.

Bussy-la-Pesle (French pronunciation: [bysi la pɛl]) is a commune in the Nièvre department in central France.

== Population ==
Historical population
Year	Pop.	±% p.a.
1968	50	—
1975	42	−2.46%
1982	44	+0.67%
1990	38	−1.82%
1999	32	−1.89%
2007	47	+4.92%
2012	47	+0.00%
2017	56	+3.57%
2023	50	−1.87%
Source: INSEE

== See also ==
- Communes of the Nièvre department
