= Pazy =

- Commune
- Coat of arms
- Location of Pazy
- Location within France Location within Bourgogne-Franche-Comté
- Coordinates: 47°13′48″N 3°37′39″E
- Country: France
- Region: Bourgogne-Franche-Comté
- Department: Nièvre
- Arrondissement: Clamecy
- Canton: Corbigny

Government
  - Mayor (2020–2026): Thierry Camuzat
- Area^{1}: 21.99 km^{2} (8.49 sq mi)
- Highest elevation: 296 m (971 ft)
- Lowest elevation: 195 m (640 ft)
- Population (2023): 293
  - Density: 13.3/km^{2} (34.5/sq mi)
- Time zone: UTC+01:00 (CET)
  - Summer (DST): UTC+02:00 (CEST)
- INSEE/Postal code: 58208 /58800
- ^{1} French Land Register data, which excludes lakes, ponds, glaciers > 1 km^{2} (0.386 sq mi or 247 acres) and river estuaries.

Pazy (French pronunciation: [pazi]) is a commune in the Nièvre department in central France.

== See also ==
- Communes of the Nièvre department
