= Empury =

- Commune
- Location of Empury
- Location within France Location within Bourgogne-Franche-Comté
- Coordinates: 47°21′06″N 3°49′21″E
- Country: France
- Region: Bourgogne-Franche-Comté
- Department: Nièvre
- Arrondissement: Château-Chinon (Ville)
- Canton: Corbigny

Government
  - Mayor (2020–2026): Patrick Loisy
- Area^{1}: 11.79 km^{2} (4.55 sq mi)
- Highest elevation: 465 m (1,526 ft)
- Lowest elevation: 234 m (768 ft)
- Population (2023): 72
  - Density: 6.1/km^{2} (16/sq mi)
- Time zone: UTC+01:00 (CET)
  - Summer (DST): UTC+02:00 (CEST)
- INSEE/Postal code: 58108 /58140
- ^{1} French Land Register data, which excludes lakes, ponds, glaciers > 1 km^{2} (0.386 sq mi or 247 acres) and river estuaries.

Empury (French pronunciation: [ɑ̃pyʁi]) is a commune in the Nièvre department in central France.

== Demographics ==
Historical population
Year	Pop.	±% p.a.
1968	123	—
1975	119	−0.47%
1982	86	−4.53%
1990	87	+0.14%
1999	99	+1.45%
2007	103	+0.50%
2012	80	−4.93%
2017	83	+0.74%
2023	72	−2.34%
Source: INSEE

== See also ==
- Communes of the Nièvre department
