= Magny-Lormes =

- Commune
- Location of Magny-Lormes
- Location within France Location within Bourgogne-Franche-Comté
- Coordinates: 47°18′01″N 3°45′18″E
- Country: France
- Region: Bourgogne-Franche-Comté
- Department: Nièvre
- Arrondissement: Clamecy
- Canton: Corbigny
- Intercommunality: Tannay-Brinon-Corbigny

Government
  - Mayor (2020–2026): Raymond Dourneau
- Area^{1}: 8.35 km^{2} (3.22 sq mi)
- Highest elevation: 272 m (892 ft)
- Lowest elevation: 192 m (630 ft)
- Population (2023): 67
  - Density: 8.0/km^{2} (21/sq mi)
- Time zone: UTC+01:00 (CET)
  - Summer (DST): UTC+02:00 (CEST)
- INSEE/Postal code: 58153 /58800
- ^{1} French Land Register data, which excludes lakes, ponds, glaciers > 1 km^{2} (0.386 sq mi or 247 acres) and river estuaries.

Magny-Lormes (French pronunciation: [maɲi lɔʁm]) is a commune in the Nièvre department in central France.

== See also ==
- Communes of the Nièvre department
