= Moraches =

- Commune
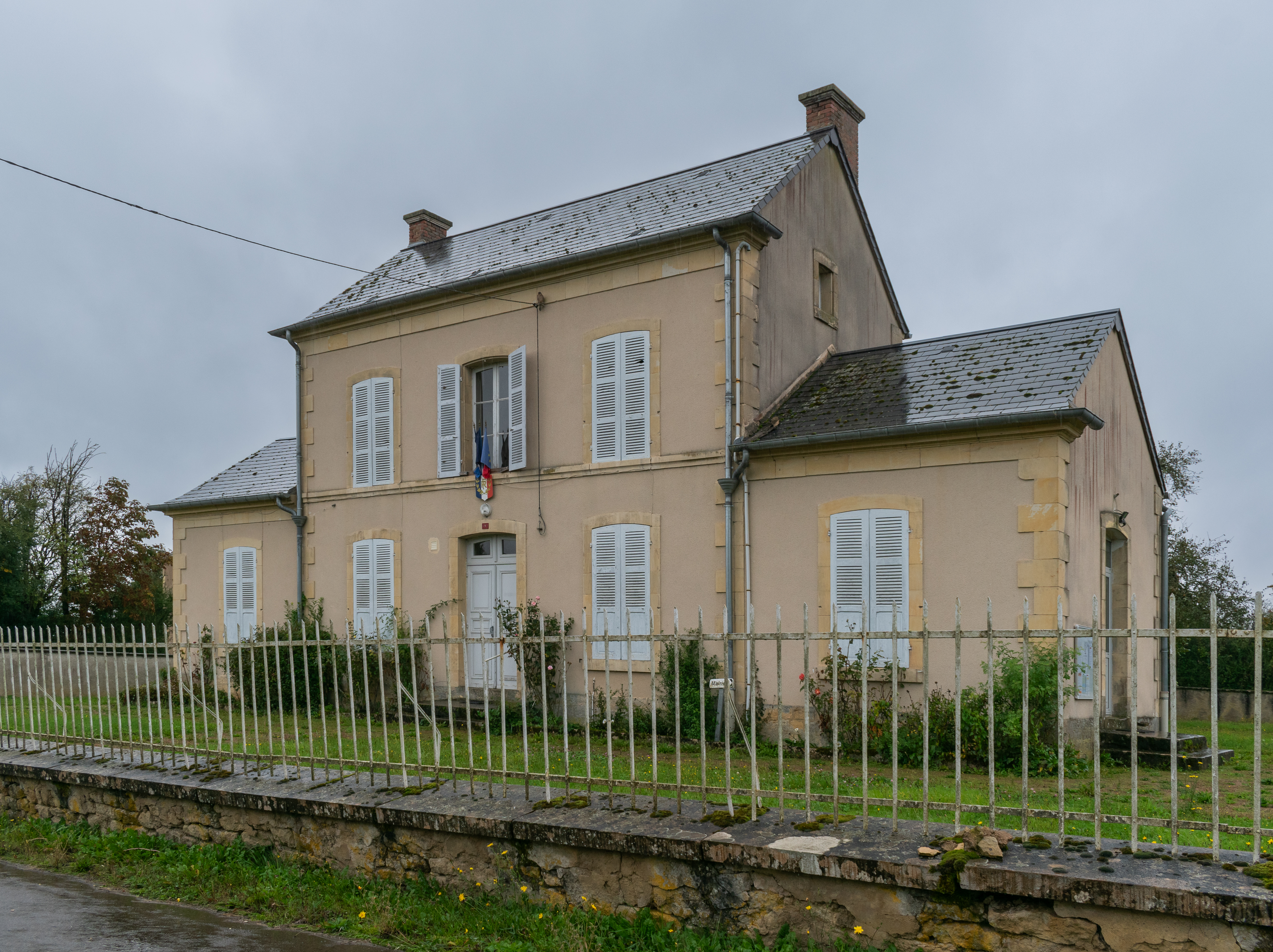
- Town hall of Moraches
- Location of Moraches
- Location within France Location within Bourgogne-Franche-Comté
- Coordinates: 47°16′49″N 3°32′57″E
- Country: France
- Region: Bourgogne-Franche-Comté
- Department: Nièvre
- Arrondissement: Clamecy
- Canton: Corbigny
- Intercommunality: Tannay-Brinon-Corbigny

Government
  - Mayor (2020–2026): Jean-Pierre Leroy
- Area^{1}: 14.90 km^{2} (5.75 sq mi)
- Highest elevation: 343 m (1,125 ft)
- Lowest elevation: 205 m (673 ft)
- Population (2023): 128
  - Density: 8.59/km^{2} (22.2/sq mi)
- Time zone: UTC+01:00 (CET)
  - Summer (DST): UTC+02:00 (CEST)
- INSEE/Postal code: 58181 /58420
- ^{1} French Land Register data, which excludes lakes, ponds, glaciers > 1 km^{2} (0.386 sq mi or 247 acres) and river estuaries.

Moraches (French pronunciation: [mɔʁaʃ]) is a commune in the Nièvre department in central France.

== See also ==
- Communes of the Nièvre department
