= Chitry-les-Mines =

- Commune
- Location of Chitry-les-Mines
- Location within France Location within Bourgogne-Franche-Comté
- Coordinates: 47°15′41″N 3°39′10″E
- Country: France
- Region: Bourgogne-Franche-Comté
- Department: Nièvre
- Arrondissement: Clamecy
- Canton: Corbigny
- Intercommunality: Tannay-Brinon-Corbigny

Government
  - Mayor (2020–2026): Jacky Germain
- Area^{1}: 6.19 km^{2} (2.39 sq mi)
- Highest elevation: 259 m (850 ft)
- Lowest elevation: 175 m (574 ft)
- Population (2023): 216
  - Density: 34.9/km^{2} (90.4/sq mi)
- Time zone: UTC+01:00 (CET)
  - Summer (DST): UTC+02:00 (CEST)
- INSEE/Postal code: 58075 /58800
- ^{1} French Land Register data, which excludes lakes, ponds, glaciers > 1 km^{2} (0.386 sq mi or 247 acres) and river estuaries.

Chitry-les-Mines (French pronunciation: [ʃitʁi le min]) is a commune in the Nièvre department in central France.

== See also ==
- Communes of the Nièvre department
