= Pouques-Lormes =

- Commune
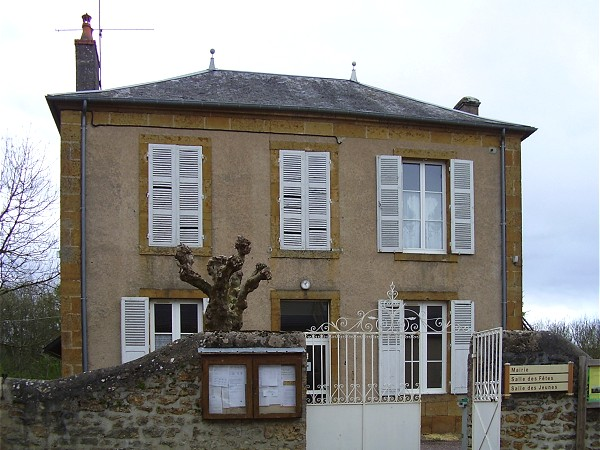
- The town hall in Pouques-Lormes
- Location of Pouques-Lormes
- Location within France Location within Bourgogne-Franche-Comté
- Coordinates: 47°19′26″N 3°46′47″E
- Country: France
- Region: Bourgogne-Franche-Comté
- Department: Nièvre
- Arrondissement: Clamecy
- Canton: Corbigny

Government
  - Mayor (2020–2026): Maurice Thevenin
- Area^{1}: 13.96 km^{2} (5.39 sq mi)
- Highest elevation: 437 m (1,434 ft)
- Lowest elevation: 216 m (709 ft)
- Population (2023): 134
  - Density: 9.60/km^{2} (24.9/sq mi)
- Time zone: UTC+01:00 (CET)
  - Summer (DST): UTC+02:00 (CEST)
- INSEE/Postal code: 58216 /58140
- ^{1} French Land Register data, which excludes lakes, ponds, glaciers > 1 km^{2} (0.386 sq mi or 247 acres) and river estuaries.

Pouques-Lormes (French pronunciation: [puk lɔʁm]) is a commune in the Nièvre department in central France.

== See also ==
- Communes of the Nièvre department
- Parc naturel régional du Morvan
