= Trucy-l'Orgueilleux =

- Commune
- Location of Trucy-l'Orgueilleux
- Location within France Location within Bourgogne-Franche-Comté
- Coordinates: 47°26′50″N 3°24′47″E
- Country: France
- Region: Bourgogne-Franche-Comté
- Department: Nièvre
- Arrondissement: Clamecy
- Canton: Clamecy

Government
  - Mayor (2021–2026): Mohammed Azeddine Filali
- Area^{1}: 13.54 km^{2} (5.23 sq mi)
- Highest elevation: 286 m (938 ft)
- Lowest elevation: 164 m (538 ft)
- Population (2023): 217
  - Density: 16.0/km^{2} (41.5/sq mi)
- Time zone: UTC+01:00 (CET)
  - Summer (DST): UTC+02:00 (CEST)
- INSEE/Postal code: 58299 /58460
- ^{1} French Land Register data, which excludes lakes, ponds, glaciers > 1 km^{2} (0.386 sq mi or 247 acres) and river estuaries.

Trucy-l'Orgueilleux (French pronunciation: [tʁysi lɔʁɡœjø]) is a commune in the Nièvre department in central France.

== See also ==
- Communes of the Nièvre department
