= Saint-André-en-Morvan =

- Commune
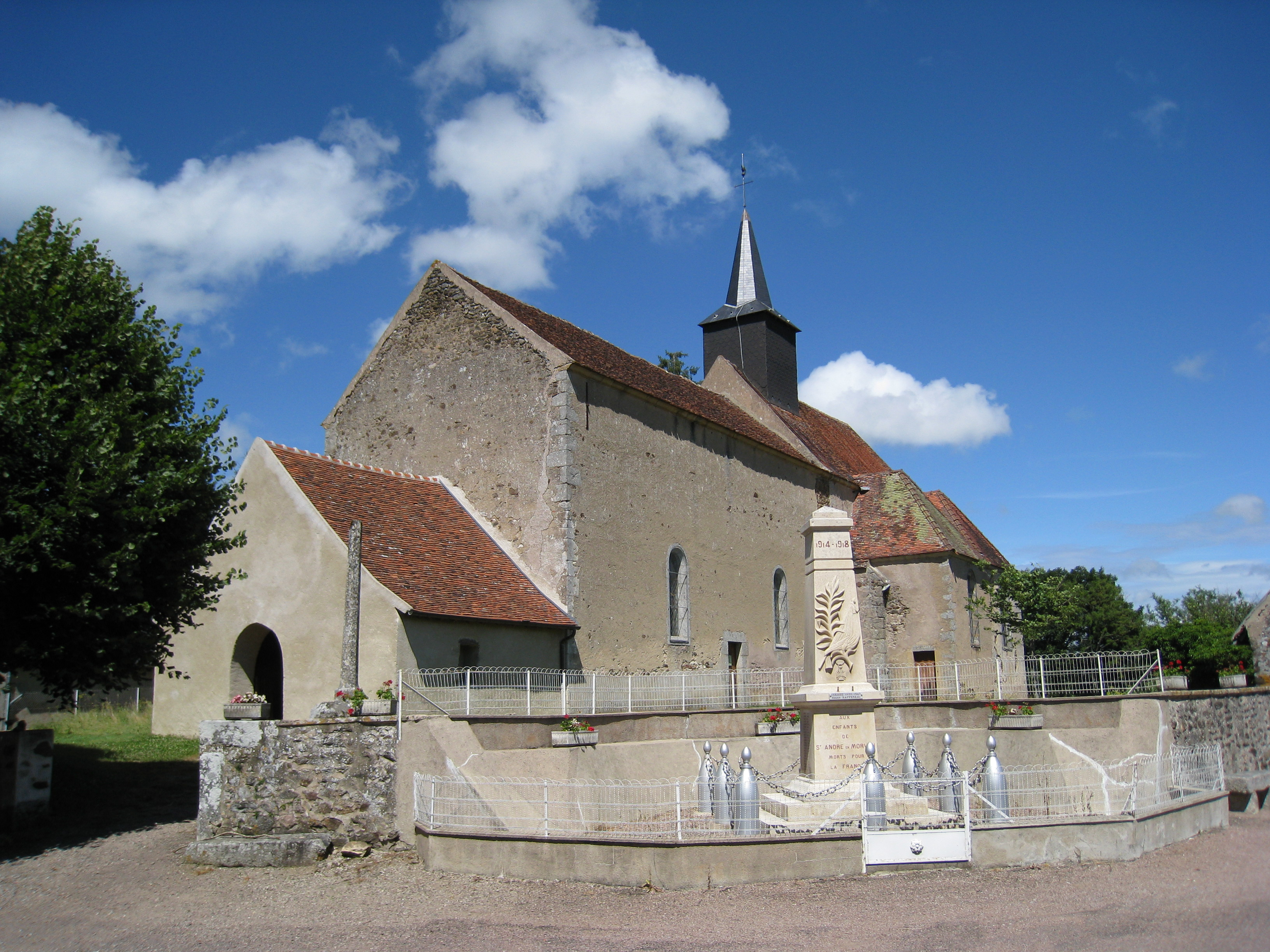
- The church in Saint-André-en-Morvan
- Location of Saint-André-en-Morvan
- Location within France Location within Bourgogne-Franche-Comté
- Coordinates: 47°23′40″N 3°51′30″E
- Country: France
- Region: Bourgogne-Franche-Comté
- Department: Nièvre
- Arrondissement: Château-Chinon (Ville)
- Canton: Corbigny
- Intercommunality: CC Morvan Sommets et Grands Lacs

Government
  - Mayor (2020–2026): Daniel Granger
- Area^{1}: 22.82 km^{2} (8.81 sq mi)
- Highest elevation: 385 m (1,263 ft)
- Lowest elevation: 170 m (560 ft)
- Population (2023): 309
  - Density: 13.5/km^{2} (35.1/sq mi)
- Time zone: UTC+01:00 (CET)
  - Summer (DST): UTC+02:00 (CEST)
- INSEE/Postal code: 58229 /58140
- ^{1} French Land Register data, which excludes lakes, ponds, glaciers > 1 km^{2} (0.386 sq mi or 247 acres) and river estuaries.

Saint-André-en-Morvan (French pronunciation: [sɛ̃t‿ɑ̃dʁe ɑ̃ mɔʁvɑ̃], lit. 'Saint-André in Morvan') is a commune in the Nièvre department in central France.

== See also ==
- Communes of the Nièvre department
- Parc naturel régional du Morvan
