= Dirol =

- Commune
- Location of Dirol
- Location within France Location within Bourgogne-Franche-Comté
- Coordinates: 47°19′02″N 3°39′17″E
- Country: France
- Region: Bourgogne-Franche-Comté
- Department: Nièvre
- Arrondissement: Clamecy
- Canton: Clamecy

Government
  - Mayor (2020–2026): Didier Petitrenaud
- Area^{1}: 9.48 km^{2} (3.66 sq mi)
- Highest elevation: 223 m (732 ft)
- Lowest elevation: 167 m (548 ft)
- Population (2023): 104
  - Density: 11.0/km^{2} (28.4/sq mi)
- Time zone: UTC+01:00 (CET)
  - Summer (DST): UTC+02:00 (CEST)
- INSEE/Postal code: 58098 /58190
- ^{1} French Land Register data, which excludes lakes, ponds, glaciers > 1 km^{2} (0.386 sq mi or 247 acres) and river estuaries.

Dirol (French pronunciation: [diʁɔl]) is a commune in the Nièvre department in central France.

== Demographics ==
The January 2019 estimated population was 112 people, down from the 1999 census population of 143.

== See also ==
- Communes of the Nièvre department
