= Vitry-Laché =

- Commune
- Location of Vitry-Laché
- Location within France Location within Bourgogne-Franche-Comté
- Coordinates: 47°12′03″N 3°33′54″E
- Country: France
- Region: Bourgogne-Franche-Comté
- Department: Nièvre
- Arrondissement: Clamecy
- Canton: Corbigny
- Intercommunality: Tannay-Brinon-Corbigny

Government
  - Mayor (2020–2026): Étienne Droin
- Area^{1}: 20.83 km^{2} (8.04 sq mi)
- Highest elevation: 311 m (1,020 ft)
- Lowest elevation: 249 m (817 ft)
- Population (2023): 103
  - Density: 4.94/km^{2} (12.8/sq mi)
- Time zone: UTC+01:00 (CET)
  - Summer (DST): UTC+02:00 (CEST)
- INSEE/Postal code: 58313 /58420
- ^{1} French Land Register data, which excludes lakes, ponds, glaciers > 1 km^{2} (0.386 sq mi or 247 acres) and river estuaries.

Vitry-Laché (French pronunciation: [vitʁi laʃe]) is a commune in the Nièvre department in central France.

== See also ==
- Communes of the Nièvre department
