= Oudan =

- Commune
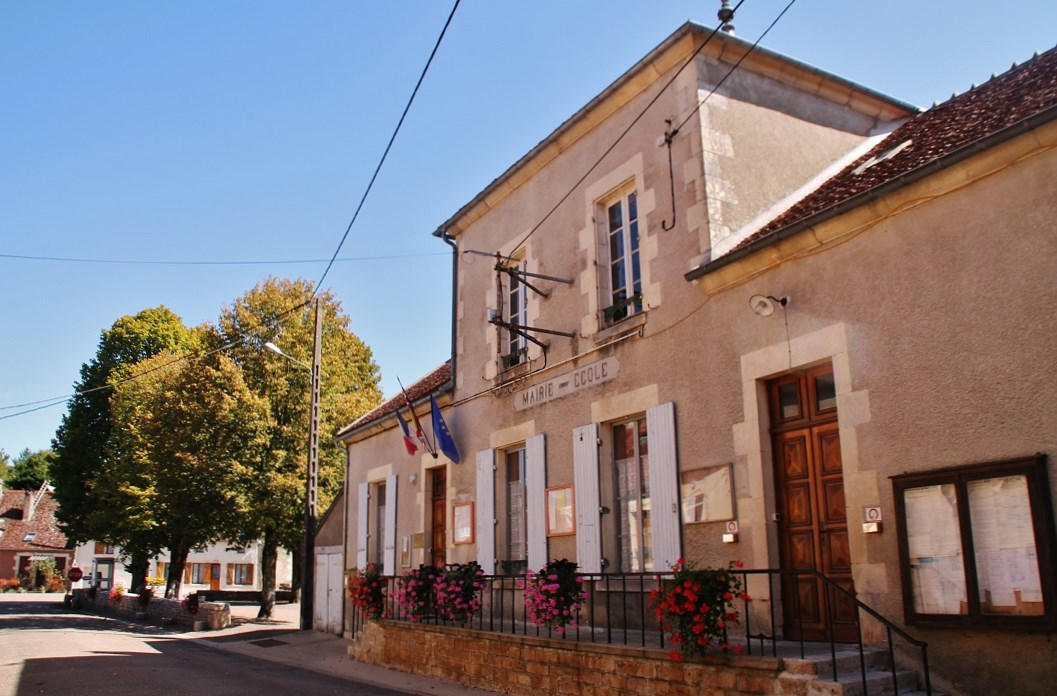
- The town hall in Oudan
- Location of Oudan
- Location within France Location within Bourgogne-Franche-Comté
- Coordinates: 47°20′53″N 3°21′02″E
- Country: France
- Region: Bourgogne-Franche-Comté
- Department: Nièvre
- Arrondissement: Clamecy
- Canton: Clamecy
- Intercommunality: Haut Nivernais-Val d'Yonne

Government
  - Mayor (2020–2026): David Letort
- Area^{1}: 20.11 km^{2} (7.76 sq mi)
- Highest elevation: 346 m (1,135 ft)
- Lowest elevation: 233 m (764 ft)
- Population (2023): 148
  - Density: 7.36/km^{2} (19.1/sq mi)
- Time zone: UTC+01:00 (CET)
  - Summer (DST): UTC+02:00 (CEST)
- INSEE/Postal code: 58201 /58210
- ^{1} French Land Register data, which excludes lakes, ponds, glaciers > 1 km^{2} (0.386 sq mi or 247 acres) and river estuaries.

Oudan (French pronunciation: [udɑ̃]) is a commune in the Nièvre department in central France.

== See also ==
- Communes of the Nièvre department
