= Neuffontaines =

- Commune
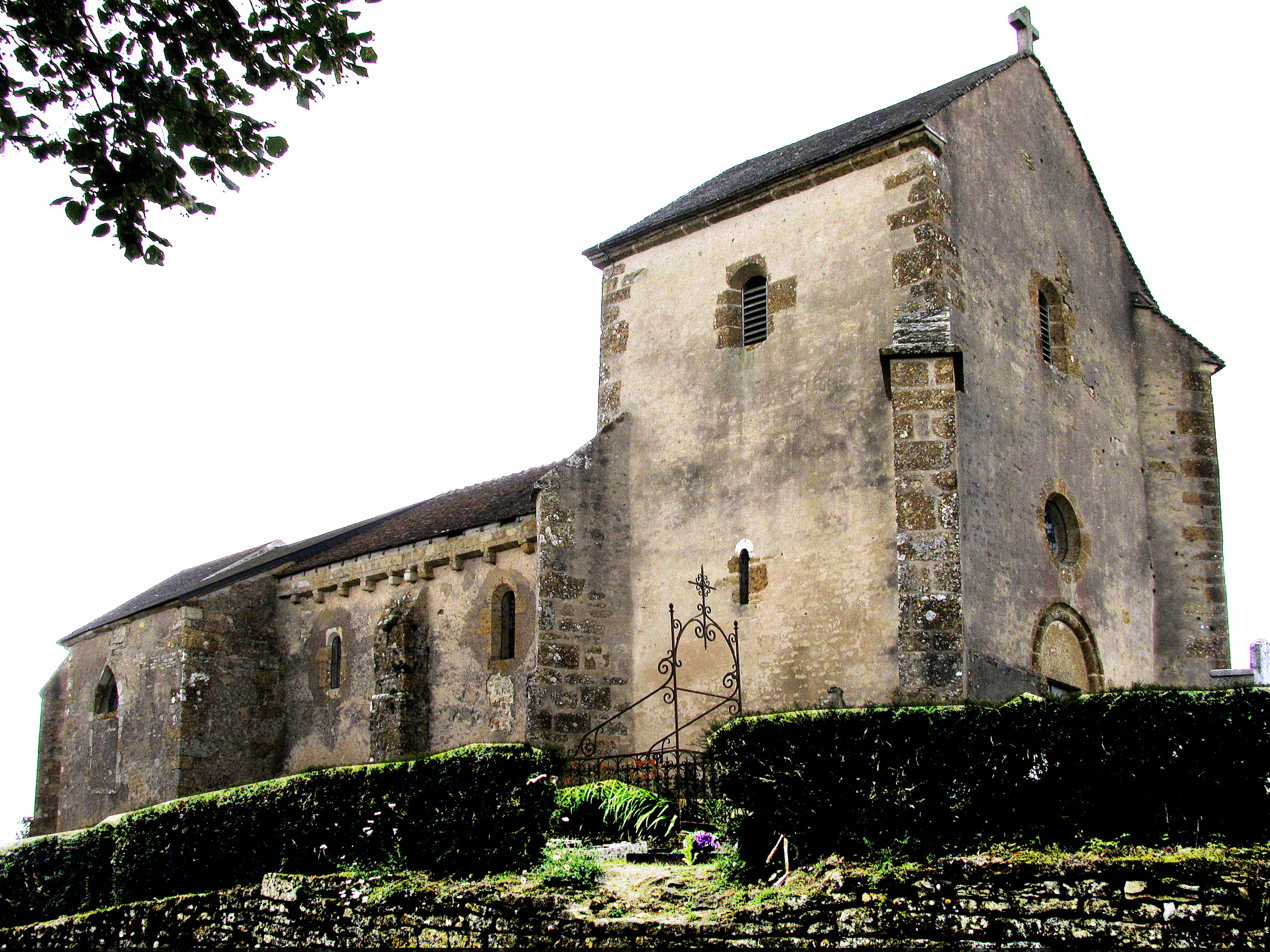
- The chapel in Neuffontaines

- Coat of arms
- Location of Neuffontaines
- Location within France Location within Bourgogne-Franche-Comté
- Coordinates: 47°21′46″N 3°44′52″E
- Country: France
- Region: Bourgogne-Franche-Comté
- Department: Nièvre
- Arrondissement: Clamecy
- Canton: Clamecy

Government
  - Mayor (2020–2026): Nicole Hernando
- Area^{1}: 14.34 km^{2} (5.54 sq mi)
- Highest elevation: 378 m (1,240 ft)
- Lowest elevation: 204 m (669 ft)
- Population (2023): 87
  - Density: 6.1/km^{2} (16/sq mi)
- Time zone: UTC+01:00 (CET)
  - Summer (DST): UTC+02:00 (CEST)
- INSEE/Postal code: 58190 /58190
- ^{1} French Land Register data, which excludes lakes, ponds, glaciers > 1 km^{2} (0.386 sq mi or 247 acres) and river estuaries.

Neuffontaines (French pronunciation: [nœfɔ̃tɛn]) is a commune in the Nièvre department in central France.

== See also ==
- Communes of the Nièvre department
