= Marigny-sur-Yonne =

- Commune
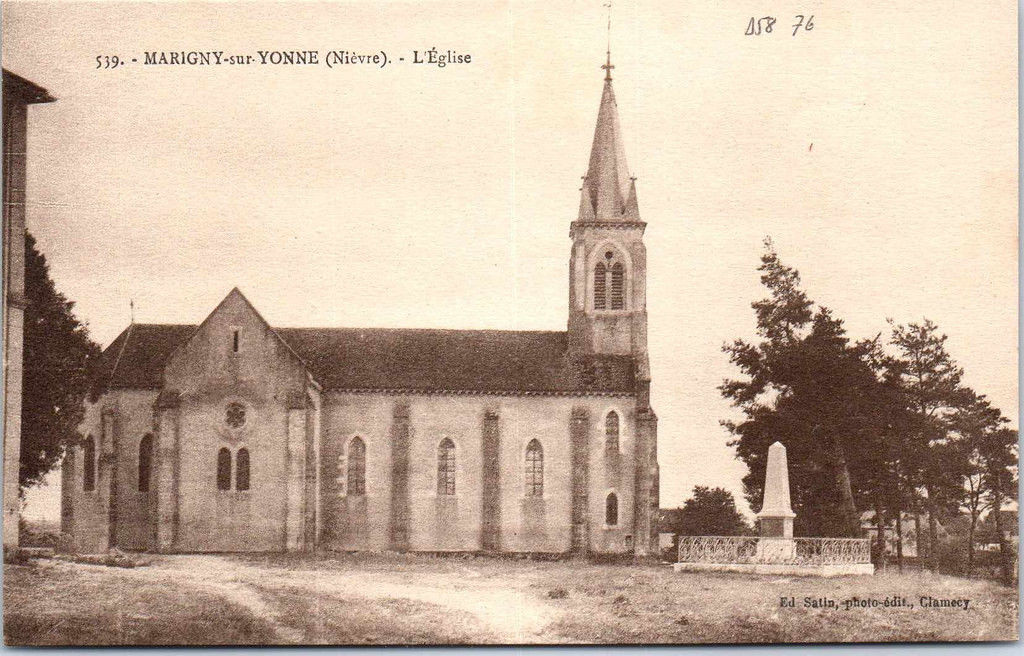
- Church, c. 1925

- Coat of arms
- Location of Marigny-sur-Yonne
- Location within France Location within Bourgogne-Franche-Comté
- Coordinates: 47°16′54″N 3°39′06″E
- Country: France
- Region: Bourgogne-Franche-Comté
- Department: Nièvre
- Arrondissement: Clamecy
- Canton: Corbigny

Government
  - Mayor (2020–2026): Guy Vadrot
- Area^{1}: 11.10 km^{2} (4.29 sq mi)
- Highest elevation: 246 m (807 ft)
- Lowest elevation: 175 m (574 ft)
- Population (2023): 191
  - Density: 17.2/km^{2} (44.6/sq mi)
- Time zone: UTC+01:00 (CET)
  - Summer (DST): UTC+02:00 (CEST)
- INSEE/Postal code: 58159 /58800
- ^{1} French Land Register data, which excludes lakes, ponds, glaciers > 1 km^{2} (0.386 sq mi or 247 acres) and river estuaries.

Marigny-sur-Yonne (French pronunciation: [maʁiɲi syʁ jɔn], literally Marigny on Yonne) is a commune in the Nièvre department in central France.

== See also ==
- Communes of the Nièvre department
