= Chevannes-Changy =

- Commune
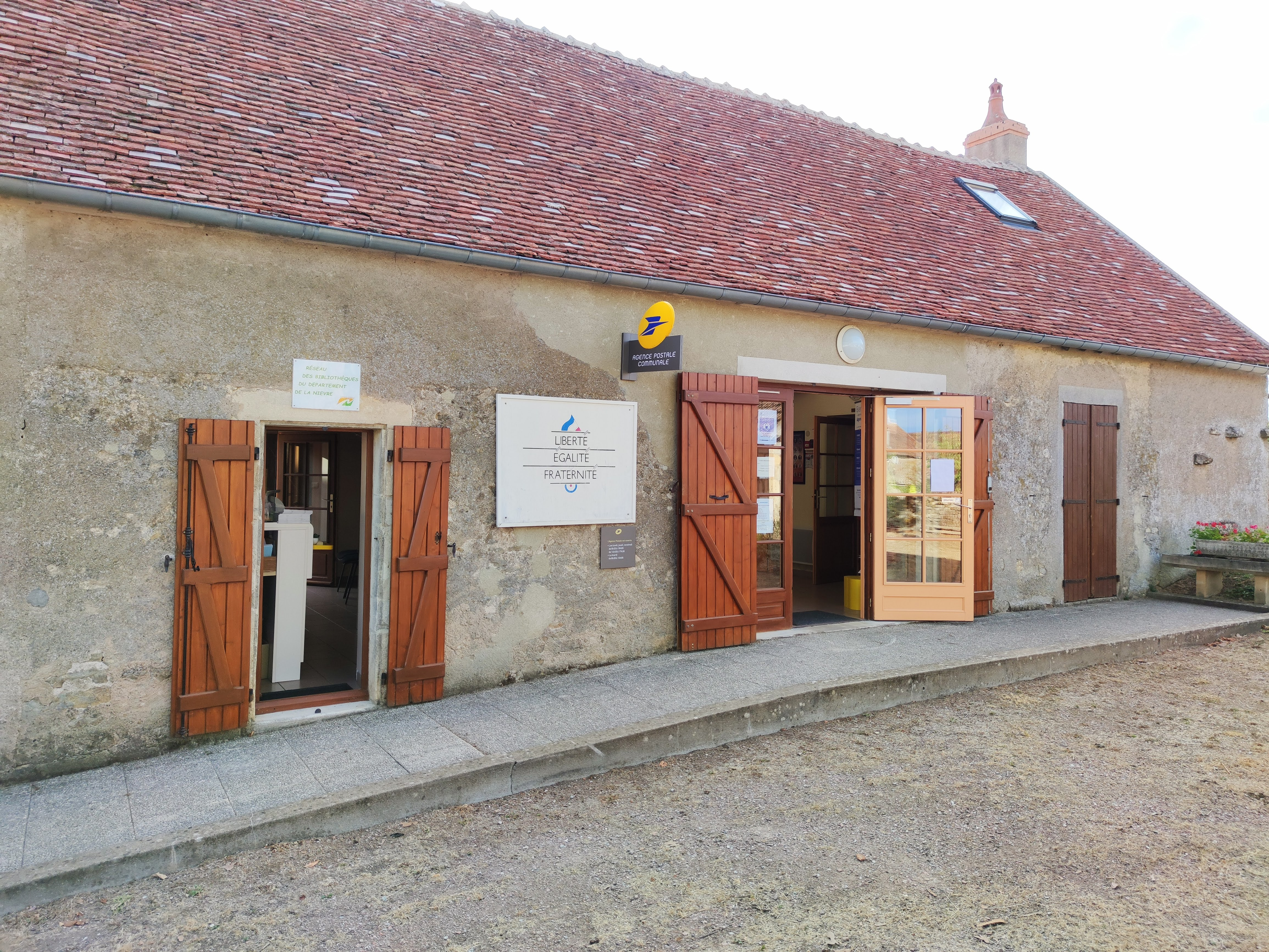
- Town hall
- Location of Chevannes-Changy
- Location within France Location within Bourgogne-Franche-Comté
- Coordinates: 47°17′24″N 3°27′11″E
- Country: France
- Region: Bourgogne-Franche-Comté
- Department: Nièvre
- Arrondissement: Clamecy
- Canton: Corbigny

Government
  - Mayor (2020–2026): Michèle Lelong
- Area^{1}: 18.92 km^{2} (7.31 sq mi)
- Highest elevation: 309 m (1,014 ft)
- Lowest elevation: 195 m (640 ft)
- Population (2023): 136
  - Density: 7.19/km^{2} (18.6/sq mi)
- Time zone: UTC+01:00 (CET)
  - Summer (DST): UTC+02:00 (CEST)
- INSEE/Postal code: 58071 /58420
- ^{1} French Land Register data, which excludes lakes, ponds, glaciers > 1 km^{2} (0.386 sq mi or 247 acres) and river estuaries.

Chevannes-Changy (French pronunciation: [ʃəvan ʃɑ̃ʒi]) is a commune in the Nièvre department in central France.

== Demographics ==
Historical population
Year	Pop.	±% p.a.
1968	243	—
1975	230	−0.78%
1982	191	−2.62%
1990	166	−1.74%
1999	157	−0.62%
2007	153	−0.32%
2012	140	−1.76%
2017	132	−1.17%
2023	136	+0.50%
Source: INSEE

== See also ==
- Communes of the Nièvre department
