= Champallement =

- Commune
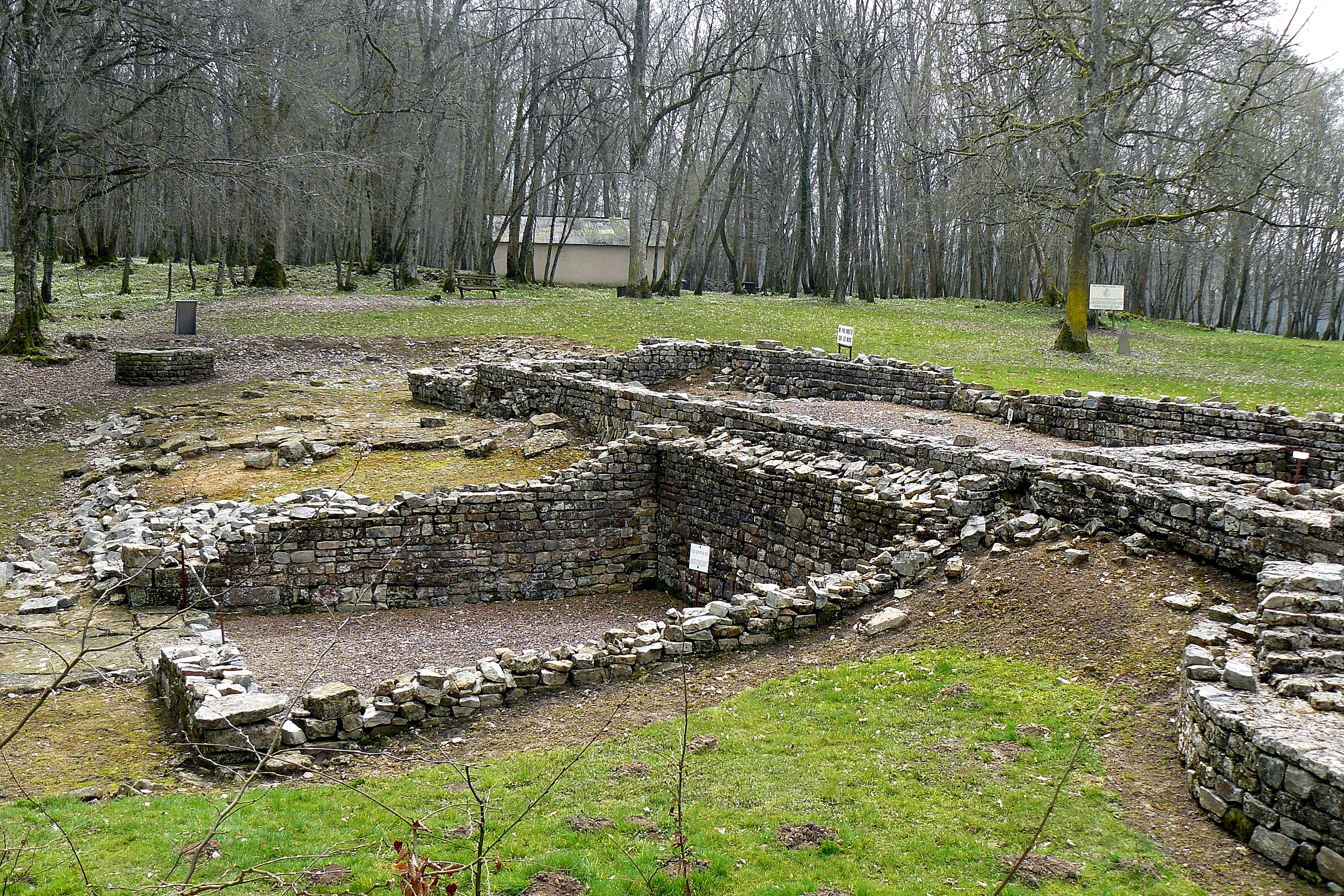
- An archaeological site in Champallement
- Location of Champallement
- Location within France Location within Bourgogne-Franche-Comté
- Coordinates: 47°13′59″N 3°29′23″E
- Country: France
- Region: Bourgogne-Franche-Comté
- Department: Nièvre
- Arrondissement: Clamecy
- Canton: Corbigny

Government
  - Mayor (2020–2026): Michel Soudan
- Area^{1}: 8.07 km^{2} (3.12 sq mi)
- Highest elevation: 349 m (1,145 ft)
- Lowest elevation: 245 m (804 ft)
- Population (2023): 56
  - Density: 6.9/km^{2} (18/sq mi)
- Time zone: UTC+01:00 (CET)
  - Summer (DST): UTC+02:00 (CEST)
- INSEE/Postal code: 58052 /58420
- ^{1} French Land Register data, which excludes lakes, ponds, glaciers > 1 km^{2} (0.386 sq mi or 247 acres) and river estuaries.

Champallement (French pronunciation: [ʃɑ̃palmɑ̃]) is a commune in the Nièvre department in central France.

== See also ==
- Communes of the Nièvre department
