= Taconnay =

- Commune
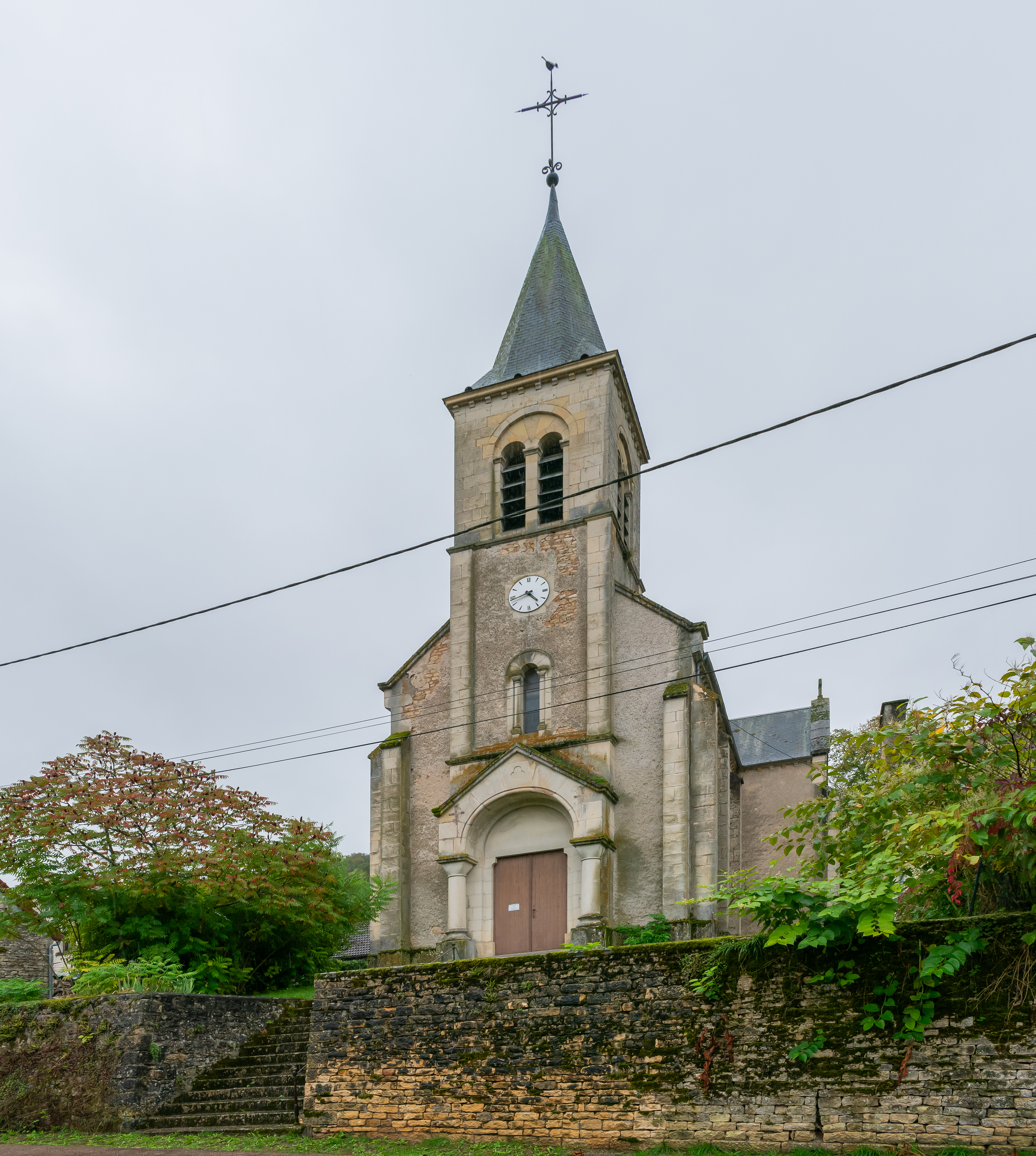
- The church in Taconnay
- Location of Taconnay
- Location within France Location within Bourgogne-Franche-Comté
- Coordinates: 47°18′28″N 3°29′39″E
- Country: France
- Region: Bourgogne-Franche-Comté
- Department: Nièvre
- Arrondissement: Clamecy
- Canton: Corbigny
- Intercommunality: Tannay-Brinon-Corbigny

Government
  - Mayor (2020–2026): Christophe Blaise
- Area^{1}: 8.00 km^{2} (3.09 sq mi)
- Highest elevation: 316 m (1,037 ft)
- Lowest elevation: 184 m (604 ft)
- Population (2023): 73
  - Density: 9.1/km^{2} (24/sq mi)
- Time zone: UTC+01:00 (CET)
  - Summer (DST): UTC+02:00 (CEST)
- INSEE/Postal code: 58283 /58420
- ^{1} French Land Register data, which excludes lakes, ponds, glaciers > 1 km^{2} (0.386 sq mi or 247 acres) and river estuaries.

Taconnay (French pronunciation: [takɔnɛ]) is a commune in the Nièvre department in central France.

== Population ==
Historical population
Year	Pop.	±% p.a.
1968	107	—
1975	92	−2.13%
1982	68	−4.23%
1990	84	+2.68%
1999	80	−0.54%
2007	73	−1.14%
2012	77	+1.07%
2017	77	+0.00%
2023	73	−0.89%
Source: INSEE

== See also ==
- Communes of the Nièvre department
