= Gâcogne =

- Commune
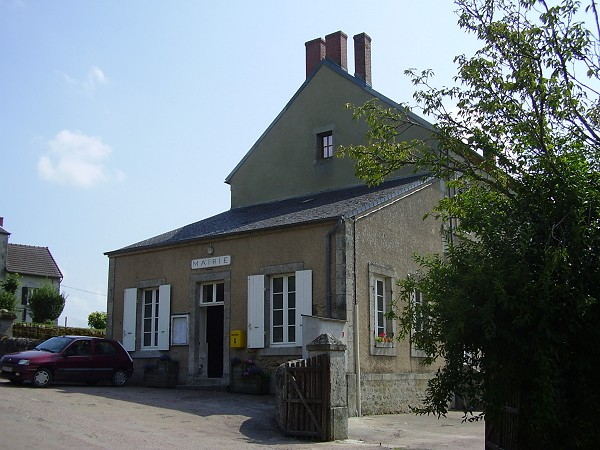
- The town hall in Gâcogne
- Location of Gâcogne
- Location within France Location within Bourgogne-Franche-Comté
- Coordinates: 47°13′50″N 3°52′15″E
- Country: France
- Region: Bourgogne-Franche-Comté
- Department: Nièvre
- Arrondissement: Clamecy
- Canton: Corbigny
- Intercommunality: Tannay-Brinon-Corbigny

Government
  - Mayor (2020–2026): Christophe Gagnepain
- Area^{1}: 25.21 km^{2} (9.73 sq mi)
- Highest elevation: 577 m (1,893 ft)
- Lowest elevation: 271 m (889 ft)
- Population (2023): 233
  - Density: 9.24/km^{2} (23.9/sq mi)
- Time zone: UTC+01:00 (CET)
  - Summer (DST): UTC+02:00 (CEST)
- INSEE/Postal code: 58120 /58140
- ^{1} French Land Register data, which excludes lakes, ponds, glaciers > 1 km^{2} (0.386 sq mi or 247 acres) and river estuaries.

Gâcogne (French pronunciation: [ɡakɔɲ]) is a commune in the Nièvre department in central France.

== Population ==
Historical population
Year	Pop.	±% p.a.
1968	474	—
1975	415	−1.88%
1982	344	−2.64%
1990	256	−3.63%
1999	250	−0.26%
2007	265	+0.73%
2012	266	+0.08%
2017	245	−1.63%
2023	233	−0.83%
Source: INSEE

== See also ==
- Communes of the Nièvre department
- Parc naturel régional du Morvan
