= Sardy-lès-Épiry =

- Commune
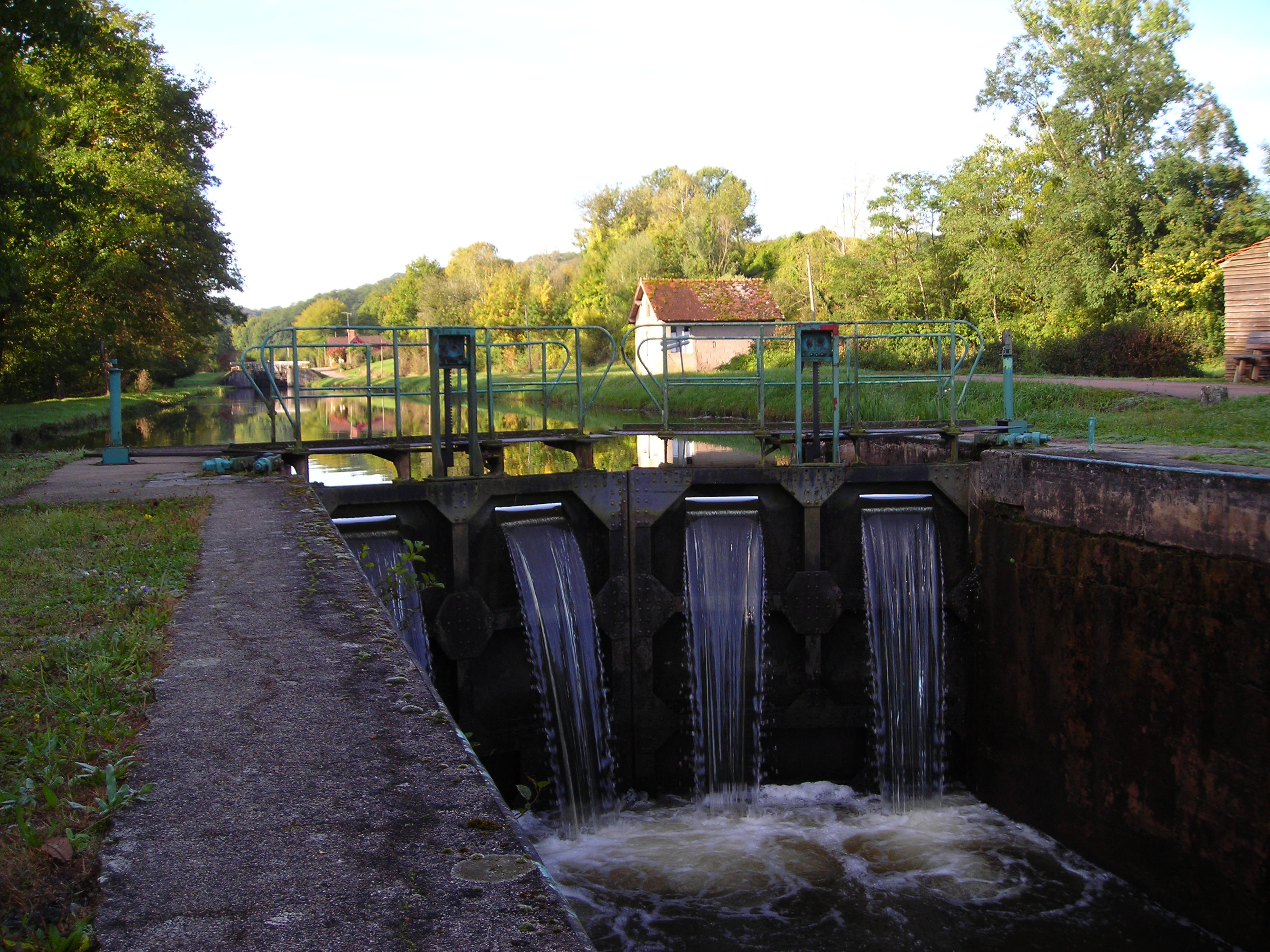
- The Canal du Nivernais at Sardy
- Location of Sardy-lès-Épiry
- Location within France Location within Bourgogne-Franche-Comté
- Coordinates: 47°11′38″N 3°42′03″E
- Country: France
- Region: Bourgogne-Franche-Comté
- Department: Nièvre
- Arrondissement: Clamecy
- Canton: Corbigny

Government
  - Mayor (2020–2026): Thierry Pauron
- Area^{1}: 15.37 km^{2} (5.93 sq mi)
- Highest elevation: 303 m (994 ft)
- Lowest elevation: 200 m (660 ft)
- Population (2023): 113
  - Density: 7.35/km^{2} (19.0/sq mi)
- Time zone: UTC+01:00 (CET)
  - Summer (DST): UTC+02:00 (CEST)
- INSEE/Postal code: 58272 /58800
- ^{1} French Land Register data, which excludes lakes, ponds, glaciers > 1 km^{2} (0.386 sq mi or 247 acres) and river estuaries.

Sardy-lès-Épiry (French pronunciation: [saʁdi lɛ.z‿epiʁi], literally Sardy near Épiry) is a commune in the Nièvre department in central France.

== See also ==
- Communes of the Nièvre department
