= La Collancelle =

- Commune
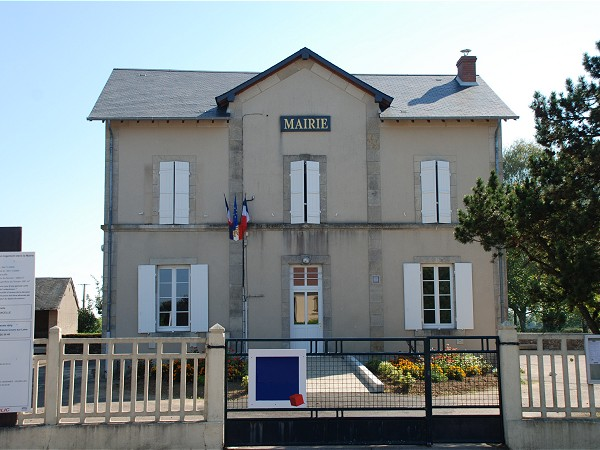
- The town hall in La Collancelle
- Location of La Collancelle
- Location within France Location within Bourgogne-Franche-Comté
- Coordinates: 47°10′33″N 3°38′27″E
- Country: France
- Region: Bourgogne-Franche-Comté
- Department: Nièvre
- Arrondissement: Clamecy
- Canton: Corbigny

Government
  - Mayor (2020–2026): Christophe Giudici
- Area^{1}: 21.95 km^{2} (8.47 sq mi)
- Highest elevation: 306 m (1,004 ft)
- Lowest elevation: 235 m (771 ft)
- Population (2023): 158
  - Density: 7.20/km^{2} (18.6/sq mi)
- Time zone: UTC+01:00 (CET)
  - Summer (DST): UTC+02:00 (CEST)
- INSEE/Postal code: 58080 /58800
- ^{1} French Land Register data, which excludes lakes, ponds, glaciers > 1 km^{2} (0.386 sq mi or 247 acres) and river estuaries.

La Collancelle (French pronunciation: [la kɔlɑ̃sɛl]) is a commune in the Nièvre department in central France.

== See also ==
- Communes of the Nièvre department
