= Saint-Martin-du-Puy, Nièvre =

Saint-Martin-du-Puy
- Commune
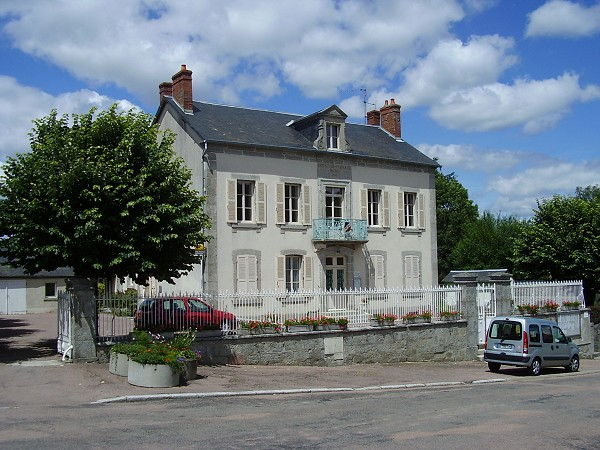
- The town hall in Saint-Martin-du-Puy
- Location of Saint-Martin-du-Puy
- Location within France Location within Bourgogne-Franche-Comté
- Coordinates: 47°20′07″N 3°52′07″E
- Country: France
- Region: Bourgogne-Franche-Comté
- Department: Nièvre
- Arrondissement: Château-Chinon (Ville)
- Canton: Corbigny
- Intercommunality: CC Morvan Sommets et Grands Lacs

Government
  - Mayor (2020–2026): Jean-Luc Vieren
- Area^{1}: 30.70 km^{2} (11.85 sq mi)
- Highest elevation: 598 m (1,962 ft)
- Lowest elevation: 316 m (1,037 ft)
- Population (2023): 290
  - Density: 9.4/km^{2} (24/sq mi)
- Time zone: UTC+01:00 (CET)
  - Summer (DST): UTC+02:00 (CEST)
- INSEE/Postal code: 58255 /58140
- ^{1} French Land Register data, which excludes lakes, ponds, glaciers > 1 km^{2} (0.386 sq mi or 247 acres) and river estuaries.

Saint-Martin-du-Puy (French pronunciation: [sɛ̃ maʁtɛ̃ dy pɥi]) is a commune in the Nièvre department in central France.

Saint-Martin-du-Puy is a small commune encompassing 8 villages in central France (Bourgogne-Franche-Comté). Plainfas is the most populated village and sits next to a lake called Lac du Caumecon.

== Demographics ==
Historical population
Year	Pop.	±% p.a.
1968	526	—
1975	392	−4.11%
1982	375	−0.63%
1990	314	−2.19%
1999	281	−1.23%
2007	332	+2.11%
2012	283	−3.14%
2017	276	−0.50%
2023	290	+0.83%
Source: INSEE

== See also ==
- Communes of the Nièvre department
- Parc naturel régional du Morvan
