= Authiou =

- Commune
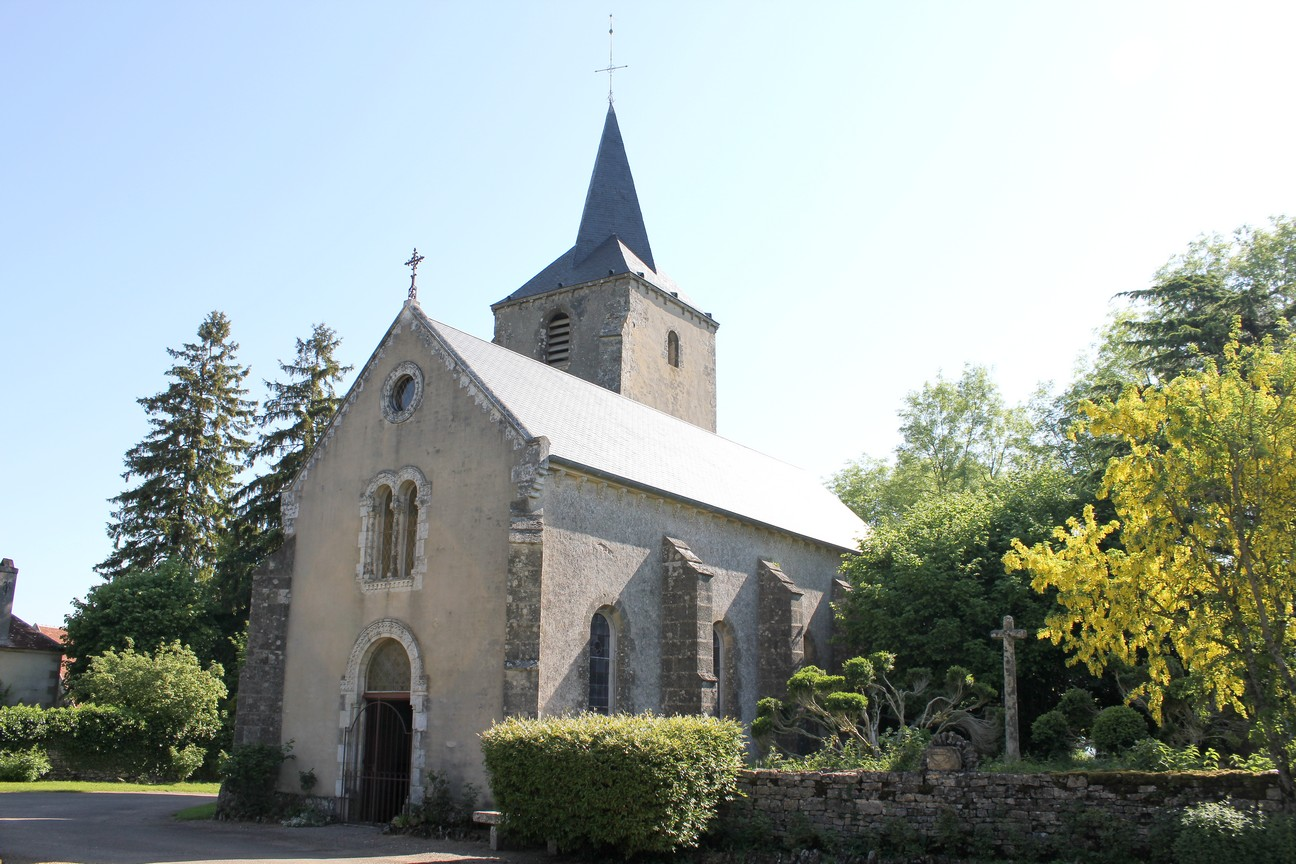
- The church of Saint-Sulpice, in Authiou
- Location of Authiou
- Location within France Location within Bourgogne-Franche-Comté
- Coordinates: 47°16′22″N 3°24′58″E
- Country: France
- Region: Bourgogne-Franche-Comté
- Department: Nièvre
- Arrondissement: Clamecy
- Canton: Corbigny
- Intercommunality: CC Tannay-Brinon-Corbigny

Government
  - Mayor (2020–2026): Pierre de Becque
- Area^{1}: 7.31 km^{2} (2.82 sq mi)
- Highest elevation: 320 m (1,050 ft)
- Lowest elevation: 224 m (735 ft)
- Population (2023): 41
  - Density: 5.6/km^{2} (15/sq mi)
- Time zone: UTC+01:00 (CET)
  - Summer (DST): UTC+02:00 (CEST)
- INSEE/Postal code: 58018 /58700
- ^{1} French Land Register data, which excludes lakes, ponds, glaciers > 1 km^{2} (0.386 sq mi or 247 acres) and river estuaries.

Authiou (French pronunciation: [otju]) is a commune in the Nièvre department in central France.

== Population ==
Historical population
Year	Pop.	±% p.a.
1968	74	—
1975	43	−7.46%
1982	40	−1.03%
1990	33	−2.38%
1999	34	+0.33%
2007	32	−0.75%
2012	38	+3.50%
2017	44	+2.98%
2023	41	−1.17%
Source: INSEE

== See also ==
- Communes of the Nièvre department
