= Vauclaix =

- Commune
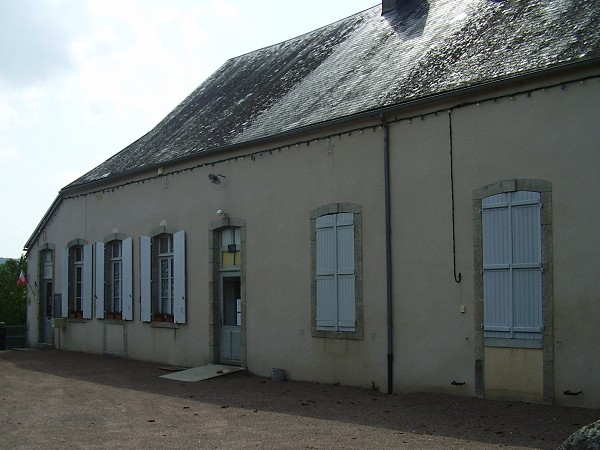
- The town hall in Vauclaix
- Location of Vauclaix
- Location within France Location within Bourgogne-Franche-Comté
- Coordinates: 47°13′59″N 3°49′28″E
- Country: France
- Region: Bourgogne-Franche-Comté
- Department: Nièvre
- Arrondissement: Clamecy
- Canton: Corbigny

Government
  - Mayor (2020–2026): André Pierre Jeanguyot
- Area^{1}: 14.39 km^{2} (5.56 sq mi)
- Highest elevation: 434 m (1,424 ft)
- Lowest elevation: 243 m (797 ft)
- Population (2023): 134
  - Density: 9.31/km^{2} (24.1/sq mi)
- Time zone: UTC+01:00 (CET)
  - Summer (DST): UTC+02:00 (CEST)
- INSEE/Postal code: 58305 /58140
- ^{1} French Land Register data, which excludes lakes, ponds, glaciers > 1 km^{2} (0.386 sq mi or 247 acres) and river estuaries.

Vauclaix (French pronunciation: [voklɛ]) is a commune in the Nièvre department in central France.

== See also ==
- Communes of the Nièvre department
- Parc naturel régional du Morvan
