= Mouron-sur-Yonne =

- Commune
- Location of Mouron-sur-Yonne
- Location within France Location within Bourgogne-Franche-Comté
- Coordinates: 47°11′26″N 3°44′32″E
- Country: France
- Region: Bourgogne-Franche-Comté
- Department: Nièvre
- Arrondissement: Clamecy
- Canton: Corbigny
- Intercommunality: Tannay-Brinon-Corbigny

Government
  - Mayor (2020–2026): Anne Guiblin
- Area^{1}: 10.76 km^{2} (4.15 sq mi)
- Highest elevation: 359 m (1,178 ft)
- Lowest elevation: 208 m (682 ft)
- Population (2023): 88
  - Density: 8.2/km^{2} (21/sq mi)
- Time zone: UTC+01:00 (CET)
  - Summer (DST): UTC+02:00 (CEST)
- INSEE/Postal code: 58183 /58800
- ^{1} French Land Register data, which excludes lakes, ponds, glaciers > 1 km^{2} (0.386 sq mi or 247 acres) and river estuaries.

Mouron-sur-Yonne (French pronunciation: [muʁɔ̃ syʁ jɔn], literally Mouron on Yonne) is a commune in the Nièvre department in central France.

== See also ==
- Communes of the Nièvre department
