= Ruages =

- Commune
- Location of Ruages
- Location within France Location within Bourgogne-Franche-Comté
- Coordinates: 47°19′03″N 3°41′02″E
- Country: France
- Region: Bourgogne-Franche-Comté
- Department: Nièvre
- Arrondissement: Clamecy
- Canton: Clamecy

Government
  - Mayor (2020–2026): Pierre Landurier
- Area^{1}: 10.30 km^{2} (3.98 sq mi)
- Highest elevation: 260 m (850 ft)
- Lowest elevation: 174 m (571 ft)
- Population (2023): 84
  - Density: 8.2/km^{2} (21/sq mi)
- Time zone: UTC+01:00 (CET)
  - Summer (DST): UTC+02:00 (CEST)
- INSEE/Postal code: 58224 /58190
- ^{1} French Land Register data, which excludes lakes, ponds, glaciers > 1 km^{2} (0.386 sq mi or 247 acres) and river estuaries.

Ruages (French pronunciation: [ʁɥaʒ]) is a commune in the Nièvre department in central France.

== See also ==
- Communes of the Nièvre department
