= Teigny =

- Commune
- Location of Teigny
- Location within France Location within Bourgogne-Franche-Comté
- Coordinates: 47°23′39″N 3°40′13″E
- Country: France
- Region: Bourgogne-Franche-Comté
- Department: Nièvre
- Arrondissement: Clamecy
- Canton: Clamecy
- Intercommunality: Tannay-Brinon-Corbigny

Government
  - Mayor (2020–2026): Jean-Marc Grasset
- Area^{1}: 7.42 km^{2} (2.86 sq mi)
- Highest elevation: 337 m (1,106 ft)
- Lowest elevation: 203 m (666 ft)
- Population (2023): 115
  - Density: 15.5/km^{2} (40.1/sq mi)
- Time zone: UTC+01:00 (CET)
  - Summer (DST): UTC+02:00 (CEST)
- INSEE/Postal code: 58288 /58190
- ^{1} French Land Register data, which excludes lakes, ponds, glaciers > 1 km^{2} (0.386 sq mi or 247 acres) and river estuaries.

Teigny (French pronunciation: [tɛɲi]) is a commune in the Nièvre department in central France.

== See also ==
- Communes of the Nièvre department
