= Canton of Corbigny =

Coordinates: 47.26°N 3.68°E

The canton of Corbigny is an administrative division of the Nièvre department, central France. Its borders were modified at the French canton reorganisation which came into effect in March 2015. Its seat is in Corbigny.

It consists of the following communes:

1. Anthien
2. Asnan
3. Authiou
4. Bazoches
5. Beaulieu
6. Beuvron
7. Brassy
8. Brinon-sur-Beuvron
9. Bussy-la-Pesle
10. Cervon
11. Chalaux
12. Challement
13. Champallement
14. Chaumot
15. Chazeuil
16. Chevannes-Changy
17. Chitry-les-Mines
18. La Collancelle
19. Corbigny
20. Corvol-d'Embernard
21. Dun-les-Places
22. Empury
23. Epiry
24. Gâcogne
25. Germenay
26. Grenois
27. Guipy
28. Héry
29. Lormes
30. Magny-Lormes
31. Marigny-l'Église
32. Marigny-sur-Yonne
33. Mhère
34. Moraches
35. Mouron-sur-Yonne
36. Neuilly
37. Pazy
38. Pouques-Lormes
39. Saint-André-en-Morvan
40. Saint-Martin-du-Puy
41. Saint-Révérien
42. Sardy-lès-Épiry
43. Taconnay
44. Vauclaix
45. Vitry-Laché
