= Chazeuil, Nièvre =

Chazeuil
- Commune
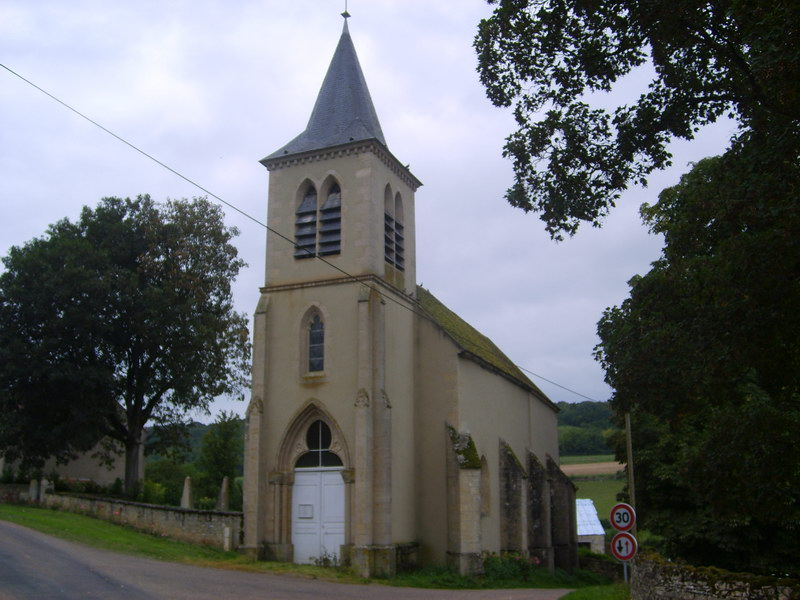
- The church in Chazeuil
- Location of Chazeuil
- Location within France Location within Bourgogne-Franche-Comté
- Coordinates: 47°16′38″N 3°24′09″E
- Country: France
- Region: Bourgogne-Franche-Comté
- Department: Nièvre
- Arrondissement: Clamecy
- Canton: Corbigny
- Intercommunality: Tannay-Brinon-Corbigny

Government
  - Mayor (2023–2026): Claude Chardenot
- Area^{1}: 4.61 km^{2} (1.78 sq mi)
- Highest elevation: 382 m (1,253 ft)
- Lowest elevation: 227 m (745 ft)
- Population (2023): 60
  - Density: 13/km^{2} (34/sq mi)
- Time zone: UTC+01:00 (CET)
  - Summer (DST): UTC+02:00 (CEST)
- INSEE/Postal code: 58070 /58700
- ^{1} French Land Register data, which excludes lakes, ponds, glaciers > 1 km^{2} (0.386 sq mi or 247 acres) and river estuaries.

Chazeuil (French pronunciation: [ʃazœj]) is a commune in the Nièvre department in central France.

== Demographics ==
Historical population
Year	Pop.	±% p.a.
1968	66	—
1975	73	+1.45%
1982	54	−4.22%
1990	39	−3.99%
1999	51	+3.03%
2007	69	+3.85%
2012	52	−5.50%
2017	59	+2.56%
2023	60	+0.28%
Source: INSEE

== See also ==
- Communes of the Nièvre department
