= Chaumot, Nièvre =

Chaumot
- Commune
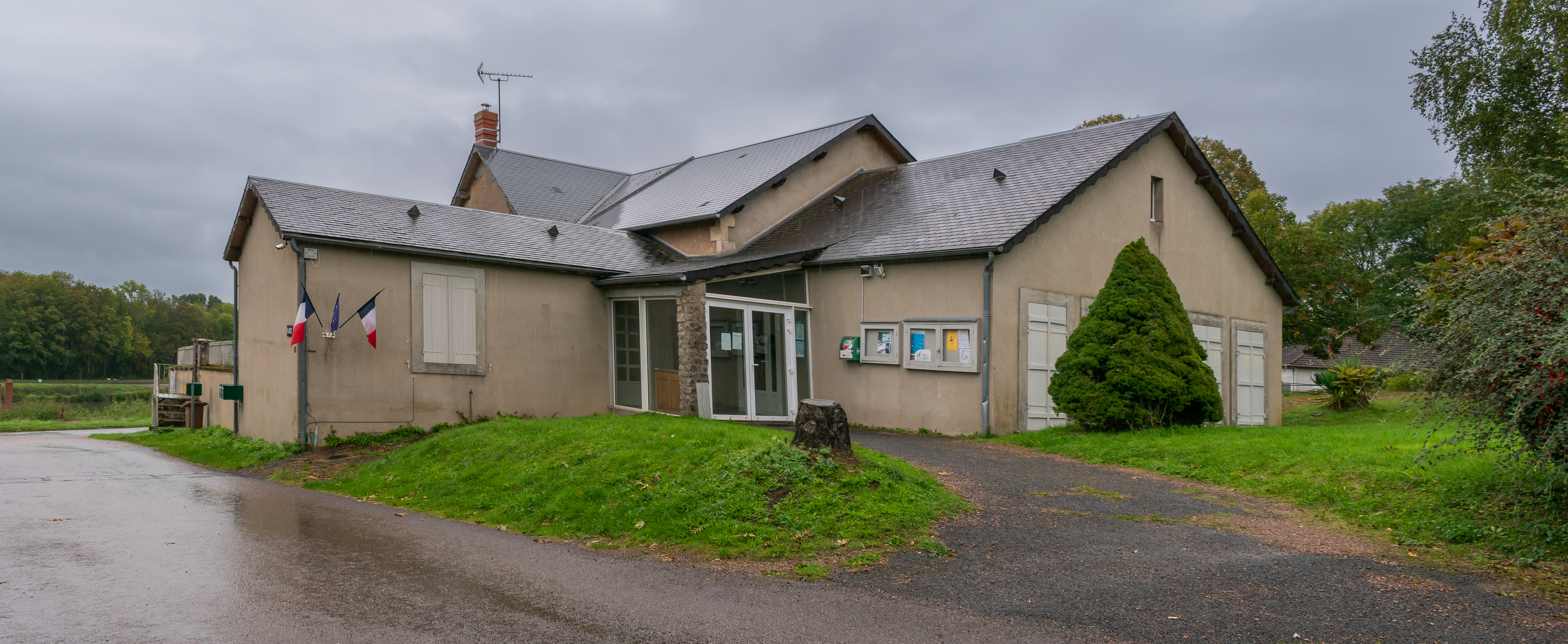
- Town hall of Chaumot Nievre
- Location of Chaumot
- Location within France Location within Bourgogne-Franche-Comté
- Coordinates: 47°15′26″N 3°38′52″E
- Country: France
- Region: Bourgogne-Franche-Comté
- Department: Nièvre
- Arrondissement: Clamecy
- Canton: Corbigny
- Intercommunality: Tannay-Brinon-Corbigny

Government
  - Mayor (2020–2026): Bernard Colas
- Area^{1}: 7.69 km^{2} (2.97 sq mi)
- Highest elevation: 268 m (879 ft)
- Lowest elevation: 184 m (604 ft)
- Population (2023): 164
  - Density: 21.3/km^{2} (55.2/sq mi)
- Time zone: UTC+01:00 (CET)
  - Summer (DST): UTC+02:00 (CEST)
- INSEE/Postal code: 58069 /58800
- ^{1} French Land Register data, which excludes lakes, ponds, glaciers > 1 km^{2} (0.386 sq mi or 247 acres) and river estuaries.

Chaumot (French pronunciation: [ʃomo]) is a commune in the Nièvre department in central France.

== Demographics ==
Historical population
Year	Pop.	±% p.a.
1968	108	—
1975	106	−0.27%
1982	124	+2.27%
1990	170	+4.02%
1999	170	+0.00%
2007	162	−0.60%
2012	177	+1.79%
2017	158	−2.25%
2023	164	+0.62%
Source: INSEE

== See also ==
- Communes of the Nièvre department
