= Brinay =

Brinay may refer to the following places in France:

- Brinay, Cher, a commune in the department of Cher
- Brinay, Nièvre, a commune in the department of Nièvre
