= Arrondissement of Château-Chinon (Ville) =

Coordinates: 47.0650°N 3.9344°E

Château-Chinon (Ville)
- Arrondissement
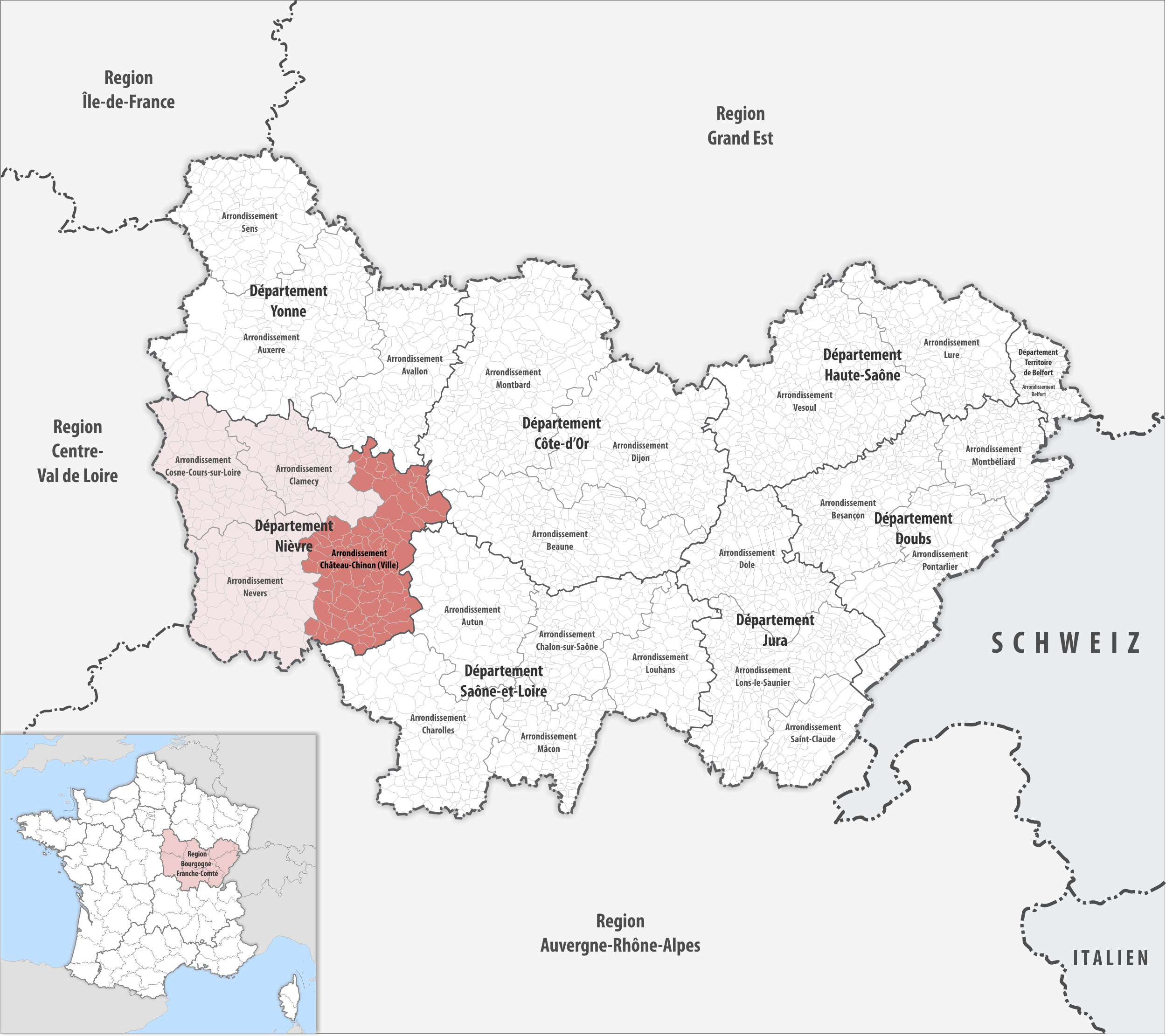
- Location within the region Bourgogne-Franche-Comté
- Country: France
- Region: Bourgogne-Franche-Comté
- Department: Nièvre
- No. of communes: {{{nbcomm}}}
- Area: 2,168.3 km^{2} (837.2 sq mi)
- Population (2023): 26,846
  - Density: 12.381/km^{2} (32.067/sq mi)
- INSEE code: 581

The arrondissement of Château-Chinon (Ville) is an arrondissement of France in the Nièvre department in the Bourgogne-Franche-Comté region. It has 80 communes. Its population is 27,268 (2021), and its area is 2,168.3 km^{2} (837.2 sq mi).

== Composition ==
The communes of the arrondissement of Château-Chinon (Ville), and their INSEE codes, are:

1. Achun (58001)
2. Alligny-en-Morvan (58003)
3. Alluy (58004)
4. Arleuf (58010)
5. Aunay-en-Bazois (58017)
6. Avrée (58019)
7. Bazoches (58023)
8. Biches (58030)
9. Blismes (58034)
10. Brassy (58037)
11. Brinay (58040)
12. Cercy-la-Tour (58046)
13. Chalaux (58049)
14. Charrin (58060)
15. Château-Chinon (Campagne) (58063)
16. Château-Chinon (Ville) (58062)
17. Châtillon-en-Bazois (58065)
18. Châtin (58066)
19. Chaumard (58068)
20. Chiddes (58074)
21. Chougny (58076)
22. Corancy (58082)
23. Dommartin (58099)
24. Dun-les-Places (58106)
25. Dun-sur-Grandry (58107)
26. Empury (58108)
27. Fâchin (58111)
28. Fléty (58114)
29. Fours (58118)
30. Gien-sur-Cure (58125)
31. Glux-en-Glenne (58128)
32. Gouloux (58129)
33. Isenay (58135)
34. Lanty (58139)
35. Larochemillay (58140)
36. Lavault-de-Frétoy (58141)
37. Limanton (58142)
38. Lormes (58145)
39. Luzy (58149)
40. Marigny-l'Église (58157)
41. Maux (58161)
42. Millay (58168)
43. Montambert (58172)
44. Montapas (58171)
45. Montaron (58173)
46. Mont-et-Marré (58175)
47. Montigny-en-Morvan (58177)
48. Montigny-sur-Canne (58178)
49. Montsauche-les-Settons (58180)
50. Moulins-Engilbert (58182)
51. Moux-en-Morvan (58185)
52. La Nocle-Maulaix (58195)
53. Onlay (58199)
54. Ougny (58202)
55. Ouroux-en-Morvan (58205)
56. Planchez (58210)
57. Poil (58211)
58. Préporché (58219)
59. Rémilly (58221)
60. Saint-Agnan (58226)
61. Saint-André-en-Morvan (58229)
62. Saint-Brisson (58235)
63. Saint-Gratien-Savigny (58243)
64. Saint-Hilaire-en-Morvan (58244)
65. Saint-Hilaire-Fontaine (58245)
66. Saint-Honoré-les-Bains (58246)
67. Saint-Léger-de-Fougeret (58249)
68. Saint-Martin-du-Puy (58255)
69. Saint-Péreuse (58262)
70. Saint-Seine (58268)
71. Savigny-Poil-Fol (58274)
72. Sémelay (58276)
73. Sermages (58277)
74. Tamnay-en-Bazois (58285)
75. Tazilly (58287)
76. Ternant (58289)
77. Thaix (58290)
78. Tintury (58292)
79. Vandenesse (58301)
80. Villapourçon (58309)

== History ==
The arrondissement of Château-Chinon was created in 1800. At the January 2017 reorganisation of the arrondissements of Nièvre, it gained nine communes from the arrondissement of Clamecy and one commune from the arrondissement of Nevers, and it lost one commune to the arrondissement of Clamecy and one commune to the arrondissement of Nevers.

As a result of the reorganisation of the cantons of France which came into effect in 2015, the borders of the cantons are no longer related to the borders of the arrondissements. As of January 2015, the cantons of the arrondissement of Château-Chinon were:

1. Château-Chinon (Ville)
2. Châtillon-en-Bazois
3. Fours
4. Luzy
5. Montsauche-les-Settons
6. Moulins-Engilbert
