= Ougny =

- Commune
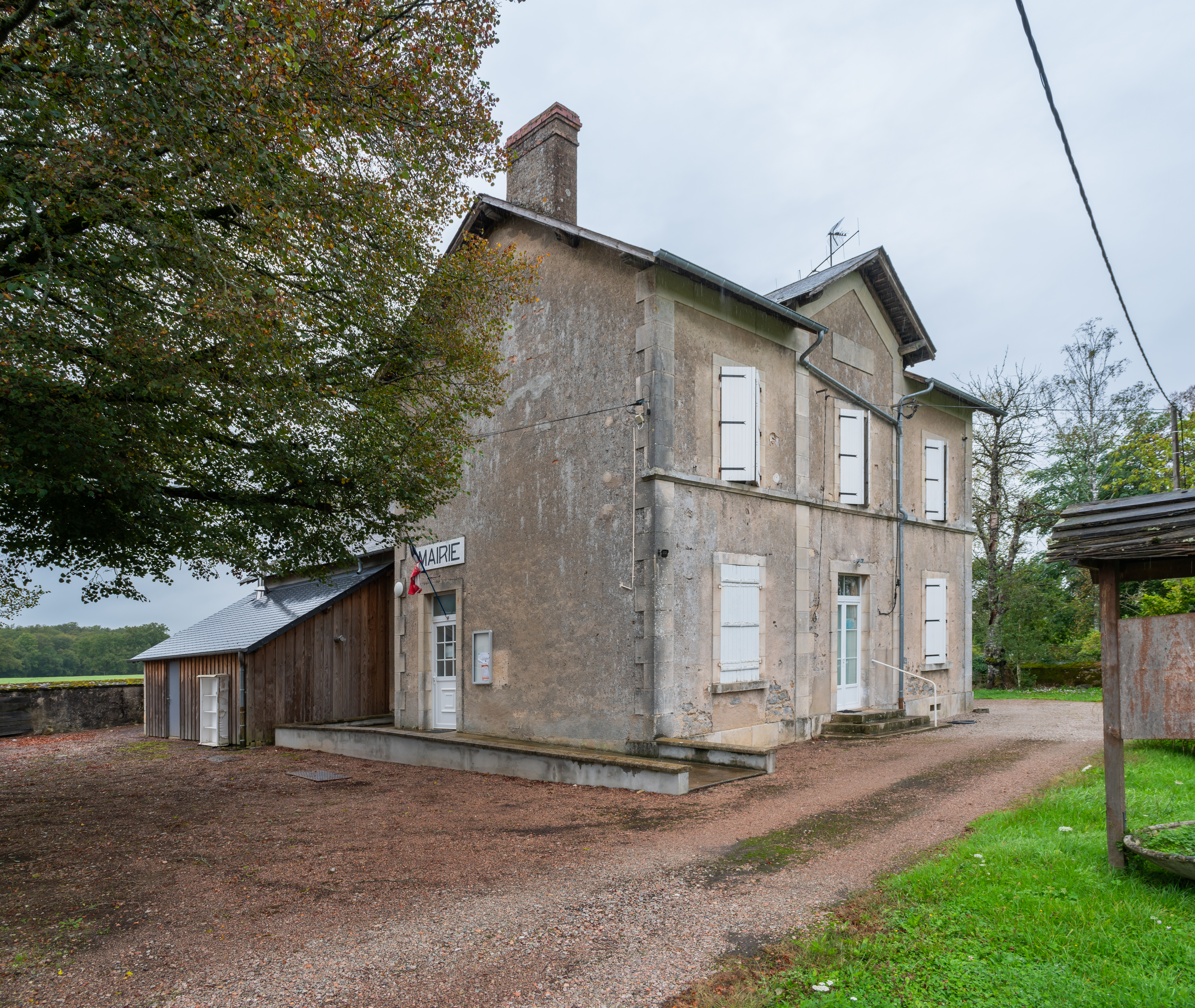
- Town hall of Ougny
- Location of Ougny
- Location within France Location within Bourgogne-Franche-Comté
- Coordinates: 47°04′35″N 3°42′41″E
- Country: France
- Region: Bourgogne-Franche-Comté
- Department: Nièvre
- Arrondissement: Château-Chinon (Ville)
- Canton: Château-Chinon

Government
  - Mayor (2020–2026): Michel Durand
- Area^{1}: 8.17 km^{2} (3.15 sq mi)
- Highest elevation: 285 m (935 ft)
- Lowest elevation: 227 m (745 ft)
- Population (2023): 28
  - Density: 3.4/km^{2} (8.9/sq mi)
- Time zone: UTC+01:00 (CET)
  - Summer (DST): UTC+02:00 (CEST)
- INSEE/Postal code: 58202 /58110
- ^{1} French Land Register data, which excludes lakes, ponds, glaciers > 1 km^{2} (0.386 sq mi or 247 acres) and river estuaries.

Ougny (French pronunciation: [uɲi]) is a commune in the Nièvre department in central France.

== See also ==
- Communes of the Nièvre department
