= Chougny =

- Commune
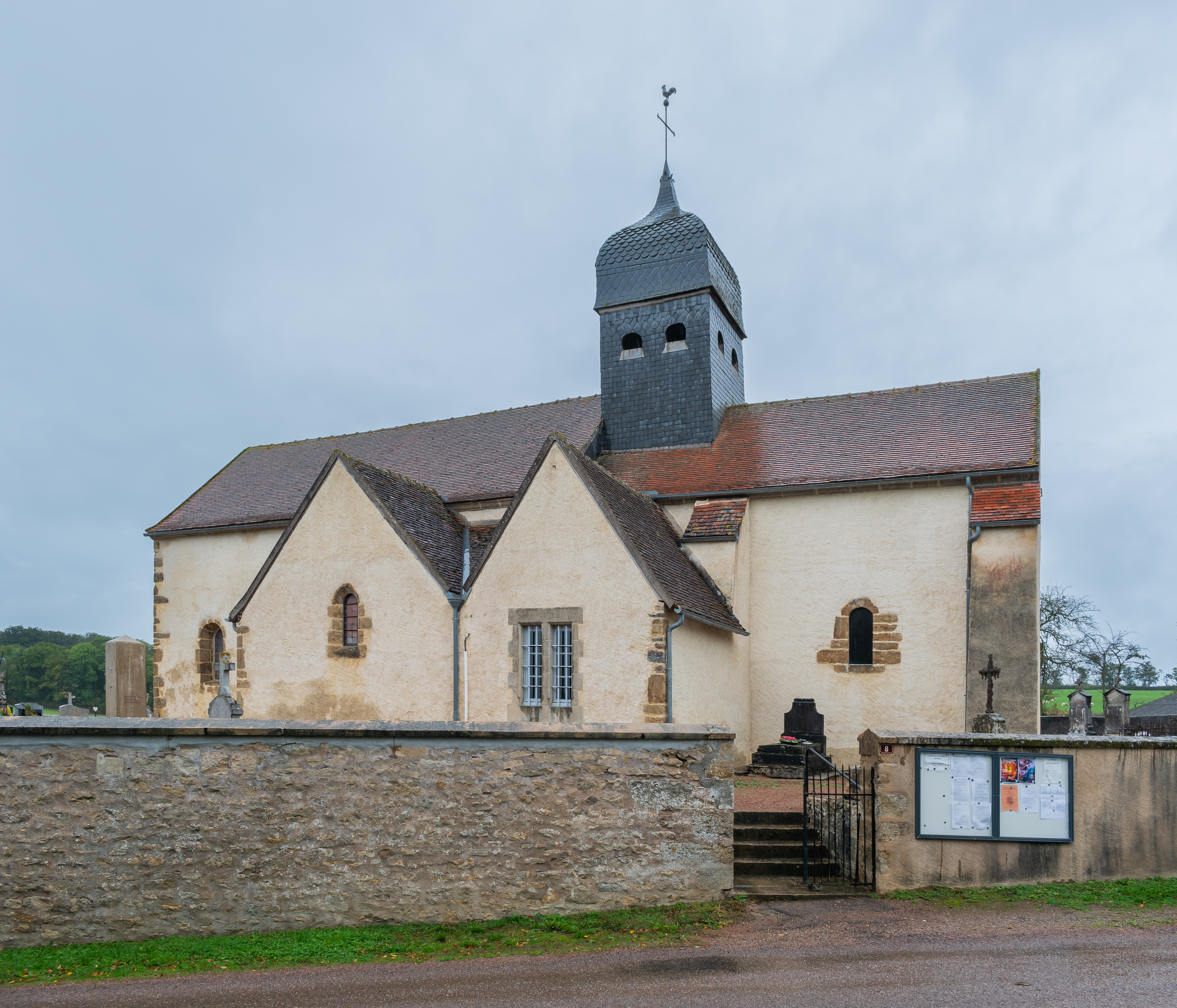
- The church in Chougny
- Location of Chougny
- Location within France Location within Bourgogne-Franche-Comté
- Coordinates: 47°05′24″N 3°45′41″E
- Country: France
- Region: Bourgogne-Franche-Comté
- Department: Nièvre
- Arrondissement: Château-Chinon (Ville)
- Canton: Château-Chinon

Government
  - Mayor (2020–2026): Thierry Laporte
- Area^{1}: 14.87 km^{2} (5.74 sq mi)
- Highest elevation: 356 m (1,168 ft)
- Lowest elevation: 233 m (764 ft)
- Population (2023): 85
  - Density: 5.7/km^{2} (15/sq mi)
- Time zone: UTC+01:00 (CET)
  - Summer (DST): UTC+02:00 (CEST)
- INSEE/Postal code: 58076 /58110
- ^{1} French Land Register data, which excludes lakes, ponds, glaciers > 1 km^{2} (0.386 sq mi or 247 acres) and river estuaries.

Chougny (French pronunciation: [ʃuɲi]) is a commune in the Nièvre department in central France.

== See also ==
- Communes of the Nièvre department
