= Mont-et-Marré =

- Commune
- Location of Mont-et-Marré
- Location within France Location within Bourgogne-Franche-Comté
- Coordinates: 47°05′24″N 3°38′27″E
- Country: France
- Region: Bourgogne-Franche-Comté
- Department: Nièvre
- Arrondissement: Château-Chinon (Ville)
- Canton: Château-Chinon

Government
  - Mayor (2020–2026): Gérard Perceau
- Area^{1}: 18.00 km^{2} (6.95 sq mi)
- Highest elevation: 291 m (955 ft)
- Lowest elevation: 235 m (771 ft)
- Population (2023): 155
  - Density: 8.61/km^{2} (22.3/sq mi)
- Time zone: UTC+01:00 (CET)
  - Summer (DST): UTC+02:00 (CEST)
- INSEE/Postal code: 58175 /58110
- ^{1} French Land Register data, which excludes lakes, ponds, glaciers > 1 km^{2} (0.386 sq mi or 247 acres) and river estuaries.

Mont-et-Marré (French pronunciation: [mɔ̃ e maʁe]) is a commune in the Nièvre department in central France.

== See also ==
- Communes of the Nièvre department
