= Planchez =

- Commune
- Location of Planchez
- Location within France Location within Bourgogne-Franche-Comté
- Coordinates: 47°08′15″N 4°01′03″E
- Country: France
- Region: Bourgogne-Franche-Comté
- Department: Nièvre
- Arrondissement: Château-Chinon (Ville)
- Canton: Château-Chinon

Government
  - Mayor (2020–2026): Laurent Librero
- Area^{1}: 43.65 km^{2} (16.85 sq mi)
- Highest elevation: 726 m (2,382 ft)
- Lowest elevation: 349 m (1,145 ft)
- Population (2023): 313
  - Density: 7.17/km^{2} (18.6/sq mi)
- Time zone: UTC+01:00 (CET)
  - Summer (DST): UTC+02:00 (CEST)
- INSEE/Postal code: 58210 /58230
- ^{1} French Land Register data, which excludes lakes, ponds, glaciers > 1 km^{2} (0.386 sq mi or 247 acres) and river estuaries.

Planchez (French pronunciation: [plɑ̃ʃe]) is a commune in the Nièvre department in central France.

== History ==
In World War II, during the German occupation of France, the area around Planchez was a focus for the Maquis. On 25 June 1944, as a collective punishment, the village was burned by German forces.

== See also ==
- Communes of the Nièvre department
- Parc naturel régional du Morvan
