= Biches =

- Commune
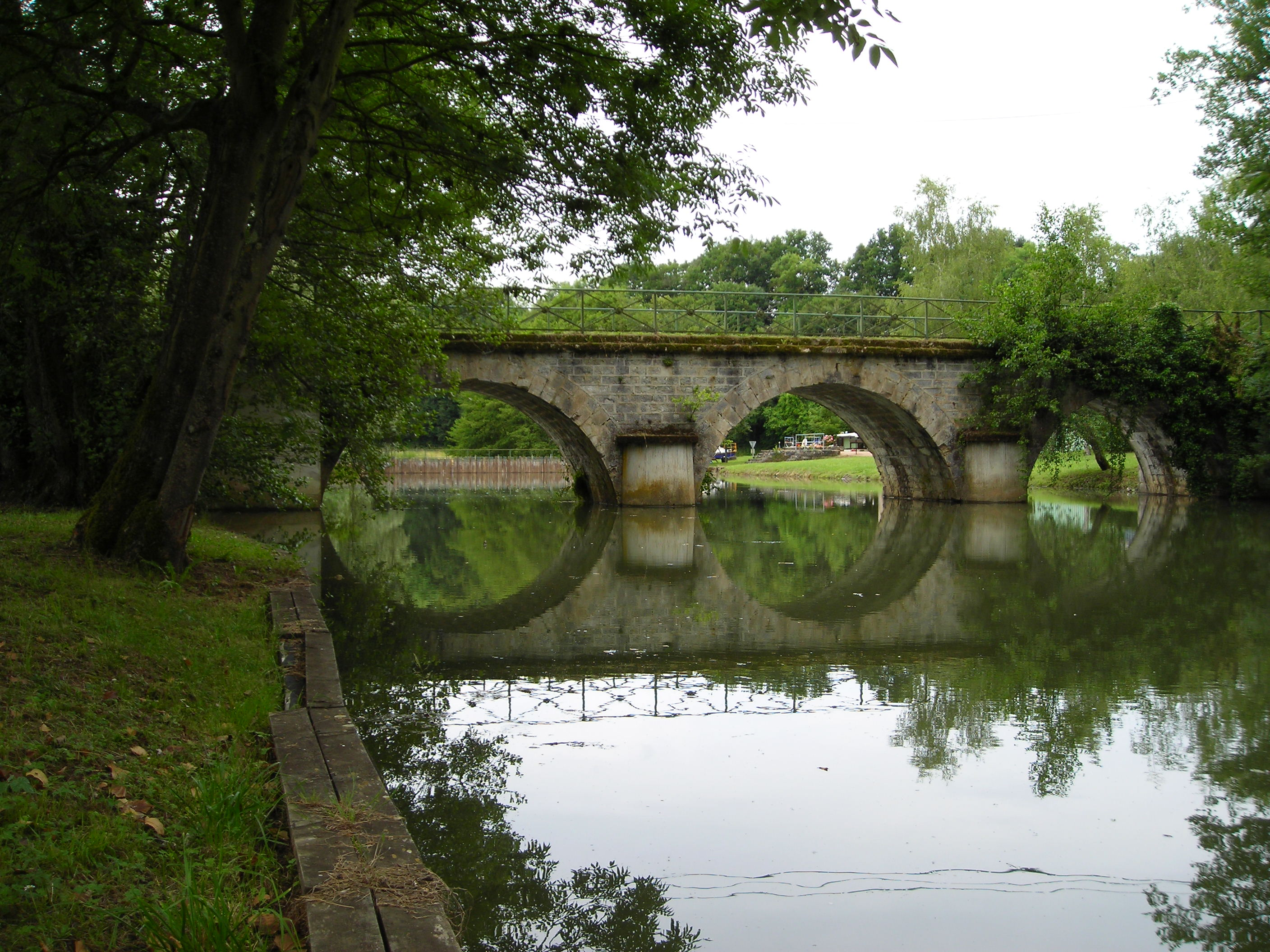
- The Aron river, in Biches
- Location of Biches
- Location within France Location within Bourgogne-Franche-Comté
- Coordinates: 47°00′26″N 3°39′06″E
- Country: France
- Region: Bourgogne-Franche-Comté
- Department: Nièvre
- Arrondissement: Château-Chinon (Ville)
- Canton: Château-Chinon

Government
  - Mayor (2023–2026): Annie Lecerf
- Area^{1}: 24.55 km^{2} (9.48 sq mi)
- Highest elevation: 307 m (1,007 ft)
- Lowest elevation: 212 m (696 ft)
- Population (2023): 240
  - Density: 9.8/km^{2} (25/sq mi)
- Time zone: UTC+01:00 (CET)
  - Summer (DST): UTC+02:00 (CEST)
- INSEE/Postal code: 58030 /58110
- ^{1} French Land Register data, which excludes lakes, ponds, glaciers > 1 km^{2} (0.386 sq mi or 247 acres) and river estuaries.

Biches (French pronunciation: [biʃ]) is a commune in the Nièvre department in central France.

== Population ==
Historical population
Year	Pop.	±% p.a.
1968	405	—
1975	416	+0.38%
1982	381	−1.25%
1990	316	−2.31%
1999	290	−0.95%
2007	337	+1.90%
2012	315	−1.34%
2017	287	−1.84%
2023	240	−2.94%
Source: INSEE

== See also ==
- Communes of the Nièvre department
