= Saint-Léger-de-Fougeret =

- Commune
- Coat of arms
- Location of Saint-Léger-de-Fougeret
- Location within France Location within Bourgogne-Franche-Comté
- Coordinates: 47°01′20″N 3°53′55″E
- Country: France
- Region: Bourgogne-Franche-Comté
- Department: Nièvre
- Arrondissement: Château-Chinon
- Canton: Château-Chinon
- Intercommunality: CC Morvan Sommets et Grands Lacs

Government
  - Mayor (2020–2026): Bernard Détilleux
- Area^{1}: 32.19 km^{2} (12.43 sq mi)
- Highest elevation: 670 m (2,200 ft)
- Lowest elevation: 304 m (997 ft)
- Population (2023): 315
  - Density: 9.79/km^{2} (25.3/sq mi)
- Time zone: UTC+01:00 (CET)
  - Summer (DST): UTC+02:00 (CEST)
- INSEE/Postal code: 58249 /58120
- ^{1} French Land Register data, which excludes lakes, ponds, glaciers > 1 km^{2} (0.386 sq mi or 247 acres) and river estuaries.

Saint-Léger-de-Fougeret (French pronunciation: [sɛ̃ leʒe də fuʒʁɛ]) is a commune in the Nièvre department in central France.

== See also ==
- Communes of the Nièvre department
- Parc naturel régional du Morvan
