= Onlay, Nièvre =

Onlay
- Commune
- Location of Onlay
- Location within France Location within Bourgogne-Franche-Comté
- Coordinates: 46°57′59″N 3°53′50″E
- Country: France
- Region: Bourgogne-Franche-Comté
- Department: Nièvre
- Arrondissement: Château-Chinon (Ville)
- Canton: Château-Chinon

Government
  - Mayor (2020–2026): Daniel Martin
- Area^{1}: 19.54 km^{2} (7.54 sq mi)
- Highest elevation: 526 m (1,726 ft)
- Lowest elevation: 272 m (892 ft)
- Population (2023): 163
  - Density: 8.34/km^{2} (21.6/sq mi)
- Time zone: UTC+01:00 (CET)
  - Summer (DST): UTC+02:00 (CEST)
- INSEE/Postal code: 58199 /58370
- ^{1} French Land Register data, which excludes lakes, ponds, glaciers > 1 km^{2} (0.386 sq mi or 247 acres) and river estuaries.

Onlay (French pronunciation: [ɔ̃lɛ]) is a commune in the Nièvre department in central France.

== See also ==
- Communes of the Nièvre department
- Parc naturel régional du Morvan
