= Châtin =

- Commune
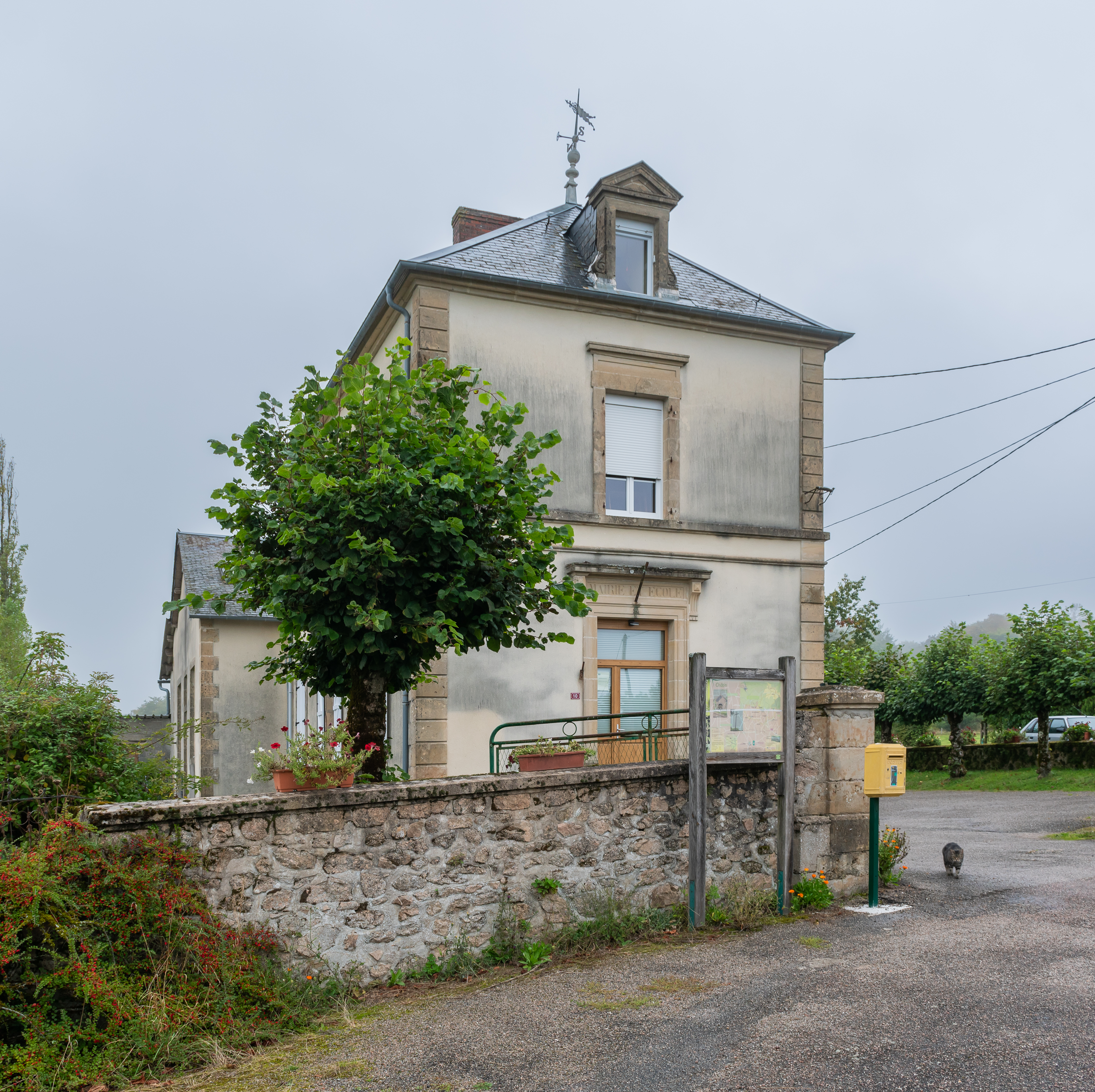
- Town hall of Chatin
- Location of Châtin
- Location within France Location within Bourgogne-Franche-Comté
- Coordinates: 47°05′50″N 3°52′27″E
- Country: France
- Region: Bourgogne-Franche-Comté
- Department: Nièvre
- Arrondissement: Château-Chinon
- Canton: Château-Chinon

Government
  - Mayor (2020–2026): Eric Jussiere
- Area^{1}: 12.99 km^{2} (5.02 sq mi)
- Highest elevation: 555 m (1,821 ft)
- Lowest elevation: 307 m (1,007 ft)
- Population (2023): 84
  - Density: 6.5/km^{2} (17/sq mi)
- Time zone: UTC+01:00 (CET)
  - Summer (DST): UTC+02:00 (CEST)
- INSEE/Postal code: 58066 /58120
- ^{1} French Land Register data, which excludes lakes, ponds, glaciers > 1 km^{2} (0.386 sq mi or 247 acres) and river estuaries.

Châtin (French pronunciation: [ʃatɛ̃]) is a commune in the Nièvre department in central France.

== Notable people ==
Châtin was the birthplace of Annick Gendron, painter.

== See also ==
- Communes of the Nièvre department
- Parc naturel régional du Morvan
