= Dommartin, Nièvre =

Dommartin
- Commune
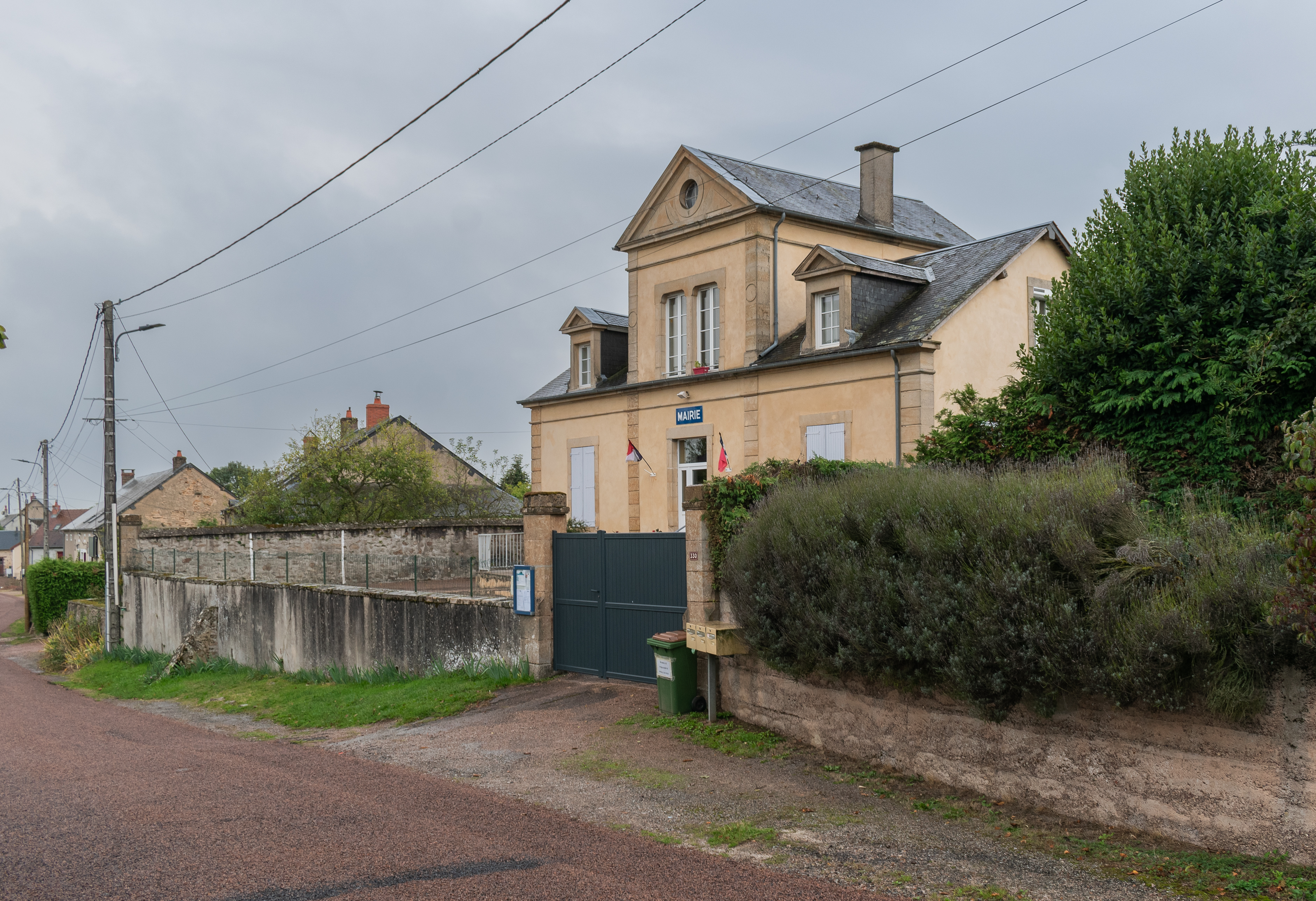
- Town hall of Dommartin Nievre
- Location of Dommartin
- Location within France Location within Bourgogne-Franche-Comté
- Coordinates: 47°04′07″N 3°50′45″E
- Country: France
- Region: Bourgogne-Franche-Comté
- Department: Nièvre
- Arrondissement: Château-Chinon (Ville)
- Canton: Château-Chinon

Government
  - Mayor (2020–2026): Fabienne Petitrenaud
- Area^{1}: 13.46 km^{2} (5.20 sq mi)
- Highest elevation: 442 m (1,450 ft)
- Lowest elevation: 275 m (902 ft)
- Population (2023): 154
  - Density: 11.4/km^{2} (29.6/sq mi)
- Time zone: UTC+01:00 (CET)
  - Summer (DST): UTC+02:00 (CEST)
- INSEE/Postal code: 58099 /58120
- ^{1} French Land Register data, which excludes lakes, ponds, glaciers > 1 km^{2} (0.386 sq mi or 247 acres) and river estuaries.

Dommartin (French pronunciation: [dɔ̃maʁtɛ̃]) is a commune in the Nièvre department in central France.

== Demography ==
Historical population
Year	Pop.	±% p.a.
1968	290	—
1975	270	−1.02%
1982	248	−1.21%
1990	205	−2.35%
1999	197	−0.44%
2007	203	+0.38%
2012	179	−2.49%
2017	170	−1.03%
2023	154	−1.63%
Source: INSEE

== See also ==
- Communes of the Nièvre department
- Parc naturel régional du Morvan
