= Château-Chinon (Campagne) =

- Commune
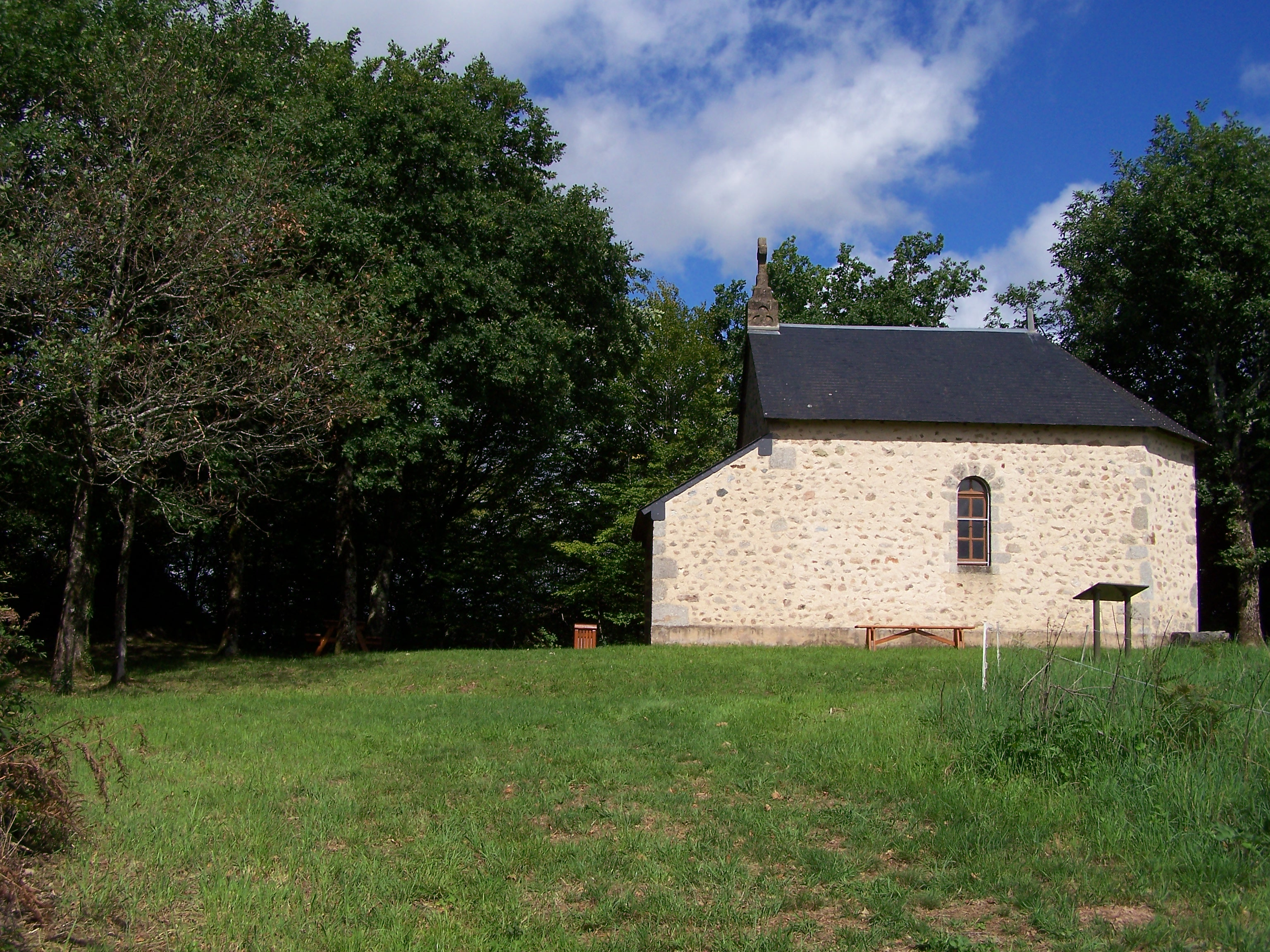
- The chapel in Château-Chinon

- Coat of arms
- Location of Château-Chinon
- Location within France Location within Bourgogne-Franche-Comté
- Coordinates: 47°03′54″N 3°56′04″E
- Country: France
- Region: Bourgogne-Franche-Comté
- Department: Nièvre
- Arrondissement: Château-Chinon
- Canton: Château-Chinon

Government
  - Mayor (2020–2026): Brigitte Gaudry
- Area^{1}: 28.39 km^{2} (10.96 sq mi)
- Highest elevation: 655 m (2,149 ft)
- Lowest elevation: 337 m (1,106 ft)
- Population (2023): 554
  - Density: 19.5/km^{2} (50.5/sq mi)
- Time zone: UTC+01:00 (CET)
  - Summer (DST): UTC+02:00 (CEST)
- INSEE/Postal code: 58063 /58120
- ^{1} French Land Register data, which excludes lakes, ponds, glaciers > 1 km^{2} (0.386 sq mi or 247 acres) and river estuaries.

Château-Chinon (Campagne), or Château-Chinon-Campagne (French pronunciation: [ʃato ʃinɔ̃ kɑ̃paɲ]), is a commune in the Nièvre department in central France.

This commune groups several villages (Précy, Les Mouilleferts, Planchotte, Le Pont-Charrot, Montbois) all around Château-Chinon.

== See also ==
- Communes of the Nièvre department
- Parc naturel régional du Morvan
