= Fâchin =

- Commune
- Location of Fâchin
- Location within France Location within Bourgogne-Franche-Comté
- Coordinates: 47°00′23″N 3°58′07″E
- Country: France
- Region: Bourgogne-Franche-Comté
- Department: Nièvre
- Arrondissement: Château-Chinon
- Canton: Château-Chinon
- Intercommunality: Morvan Sommets et Grands Lacs

Government
  - Mayor (2020–2026): Marc Bonnot
- Area^{1}: 13.88 km^{2} (5.36 sq mi)
- Highest elevation: 818 m (2,684 ft)
- Lowest elevation: 435 m (1,427 ft)
- Population (2023): 106
  - Density: 7.64/km^{2} (19.8/sq mi)
- Time zone: UTC+01:00 (CET)
  - Summer (DST): UTC+02:00 (CEST)
- INSEE/Postal code: 58111 /58430
- ^{1} French Land Register data, which excludes lakes, ponds, glaciers > 1 km^{2} (0.386 sq mi or 247 acres) and river estuaries.

Fâchin (French pronunciation: [faʃɛ̃]) is a commune in the department of Nièvre in the Bourgogne-Franche-Comté Region of central France.

== Population ==
Historical population
Year	Pop.	±% p.a.
1968	191	—
1975	147	−3.67%
1982	147	+0.00%
1990	119	−2.61%
1999	105	−1.38%
2007	113	+0.92%
2012	113	+0.00%
2017	110	−0.54%
2023	106	−0.62%
Source: INSEE

== See also ==
- Communes of the Nièvre department
- Parc naturel régional du Morvan
