= Blismes =

- Commune
- Location of Blismes
- Location within France Location within Bourgogne-Franche-Comté
- Coordinates: 47°07′56″N 3°49′16″E
- Country: France
- Region: Bourgogne-Franche-Comté
- Department: Nièvre
- Arrondissement: Château-Chinon
- Canton: Château-Chinon
- Intercommunality: CC Morvan Sommets et Grands Lacs

Government
  - Mayor (2020–2026): Marc Perrin
- Area^{1}: 26.89 km^{2} (10.38 sq mi)
- Highest elevation: 492 m (1,614 ft)
- Lowest elevation: 268 m (879 ft)
- Population (2023): 185
  - Density: 6.88/km^{2} (17.8/sq mi)
- Time zone: UTC+01:00 (CET)
  - Summer (DST): UTC+02:00 (CEST)
- INSEE/Postal code: 58034 /58120
- ^{1} French Land Register data, which excludes lakes, ponds, glaciers > 1 km^{2} (0.386 sq mi or 247 acres) and river estuaries.

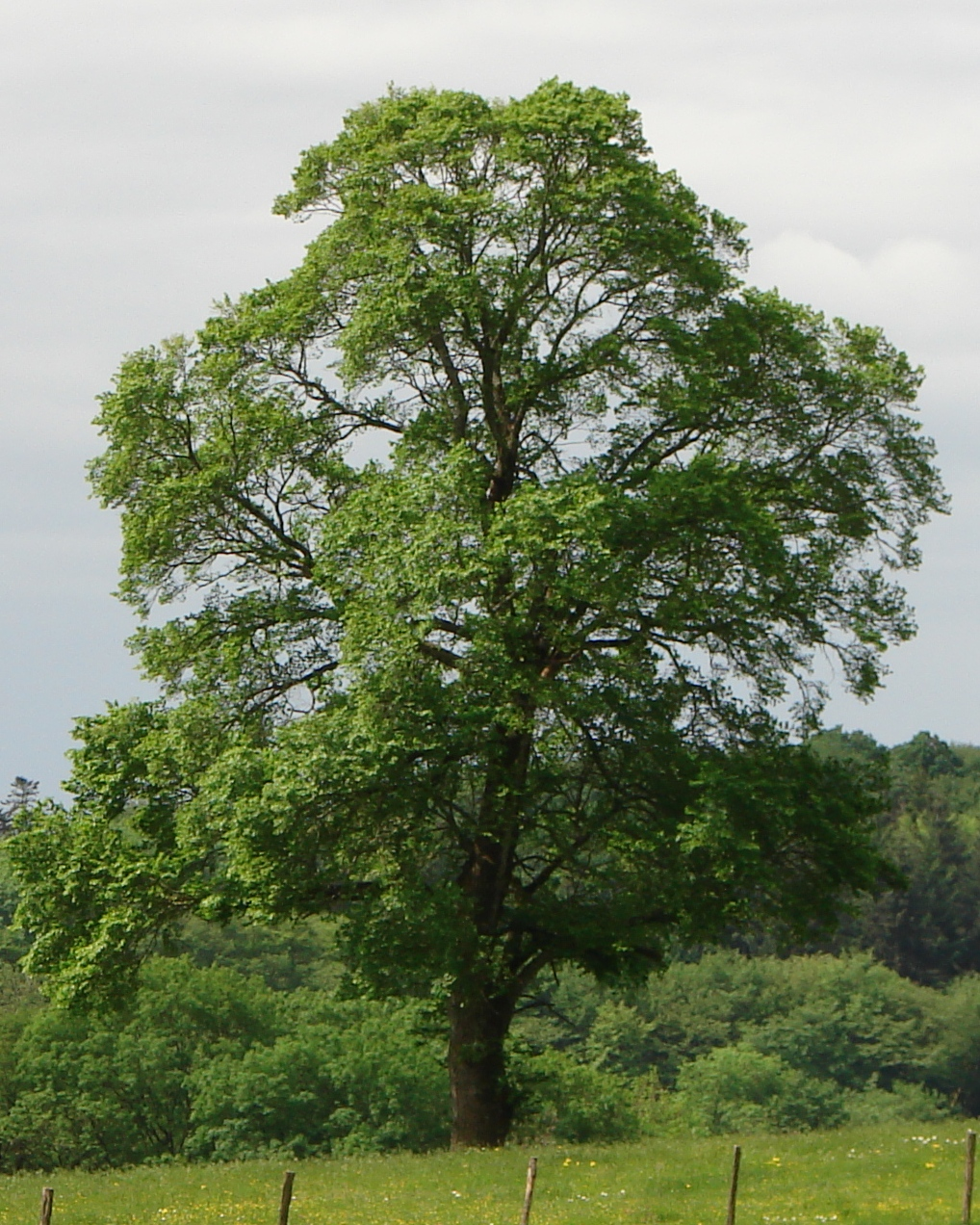
Field elm, Blismes, Nièvre, France

Blismes (French pronunciation: [blim]) is a commune in the Nièvre department in central France. The commune accommodates one of the finest specimens of field elm (Orme champetre) Ulmus minor in France.

== Population ==
Historical population
Year	Pop.	±% p.a.
1968	335	—
1975	266	−3.24%
1982	232	−1.93%
1990	233	+0.05%
1999	191	−2.18%
2007	162	−2.04%
2012	169	+0.85%
2017	180	+1.27%
2023	185	+0.46%
Source: INSEE

== See also ==
- Communes of the Nièvre department
- Parc naturel régional du Morvan
