= Tintury =

- Commune
- Location of Tintury
- Location within France Location within Bourgogne-Franche-Comté
- Coordinates: 46°59′52″N 3°35′02″E
- Country: France
- Region: Bourgogne-Franche-Comté
- Department: Nièvre
- Arrondissement: Château-Chinon (Ville)
- Canton: Château-Chinon

Government
  - Mayor (2020–2026): Pascale Chamard
- Area^{1}: 23.28 km^{2} (8.99 sq mi)
- Highest elevation: 312 m (1,024 ft)
- Lowest elevation: 219 m (719 ft)
- Population (2023): 164
  - Density: 7.04/km^{2} (18.2/sq mi)
- Time zone: UTC+01:00 (CET)
  - Summer (DST): UTC+02:00 (CEST)
- INSEE/Postal code: 58292 /58110
- ^{1} French Land Register data, which excludes lakes, ponds, glaciers > 1 km^{2} (0.386 sq mi or 247 acres) and river estuaries.

Tintury (French pronunciation: [tɛ̃tyʁi]) is a commune in the Nièvre department in central France.

== See also ==
- Communes of the Nièvre department
