= Achun =

- Commune
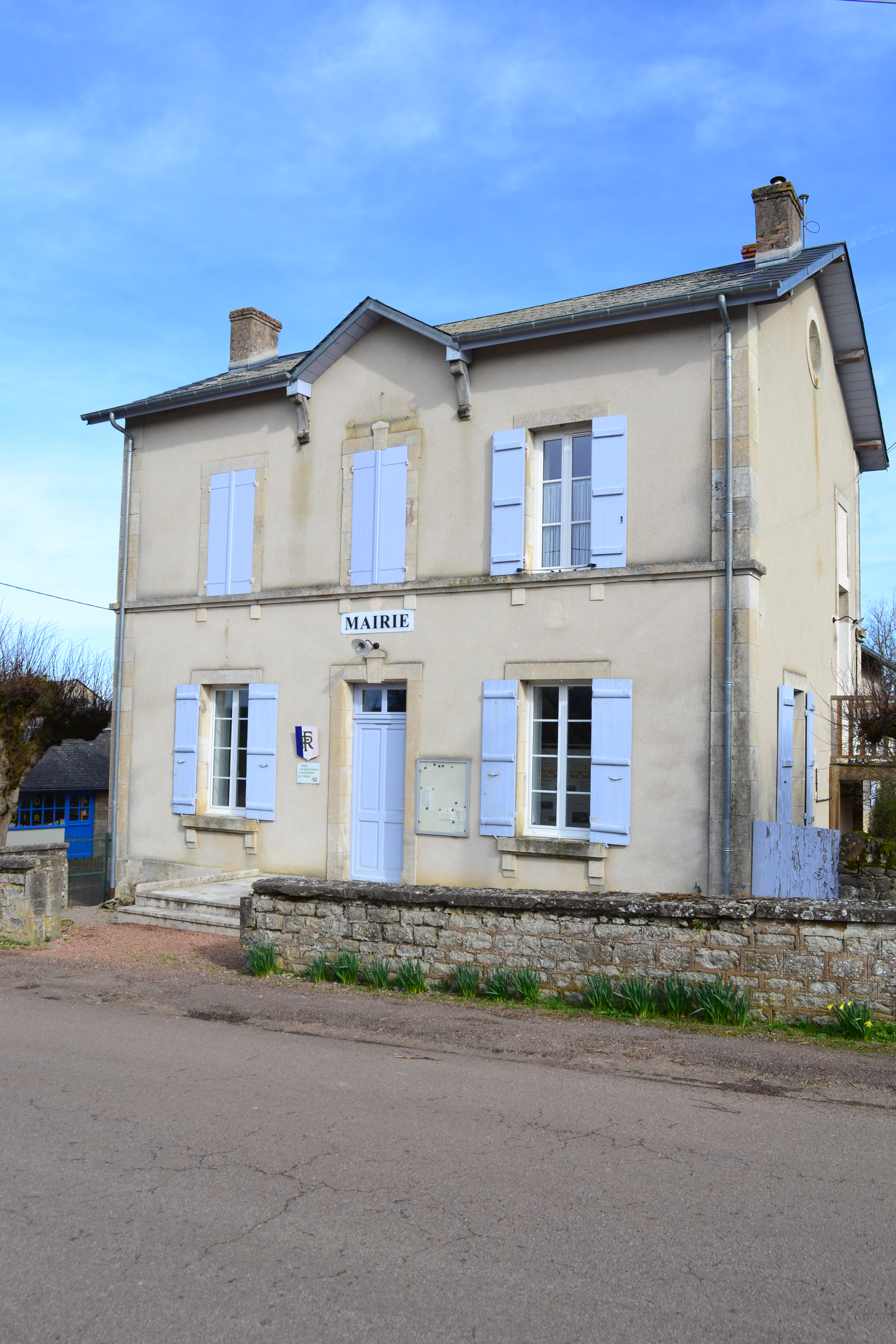
- Town hall
- Location of Achun
- Location within France Location within Bourgogne-Franche-Comté
- Coordinates: 47°07′30″N 3°40′52″E
- Country: France
- Region: Bourgogne-Franche-Comté
- Department: Nièvre
- Arrondissement: Château-Chinon
- Canton: Château-Chinon
- Intercommunality: Bazois Loire Morvan

Government
  - Mayor (2020–2026): Dominique Joyeux
- Area^{1}: 24.51 km^{2} (9.46 sq mi)
- Elevation: 267 m (876 ft)
- Highest elevation: 317 m (1,040 ft)
- Lowest elevation: 243 m (797 ft)
- Population (2023): 160
  - Density: 6.5/km^{2} (17/sq mi)
- Time zone: UTC+01:00 (CET)
  - Summer (DST): UTC+02:00 (CEST)
- INSEE/Postal code: 58001 /58110
- ^{1} French Land Register data, which excludes lakes, ponds, glaciers > 1 km^{2} (0.386 sq mi or 247 acres) and river estuaries.

Achun (French pronunciation: [aʃœ̃]) is a commune in the Nièvre department in central France.

== Population ==
Historical population
| Year | Pop. | ±% p.a. |
|---|---|---|
| 1968 | 279 | — |
| 1975 | 201 | −4.58% |
| 1982 | 177 | −1.80% |
| 1990 | 174 | −0.21% |
| 1999 | 170 | −0.26% |
| 2007 | 150 | −1.55% |
| 2012 | 141 | −1.23% |
| 2017 | 162 | +2.82% |
| 2023 | 160 | −0.21% |
Source: INSEE

== See also ==
- Communes of the Nièvre department
