= Dun-sur-Grandry =

- Commune
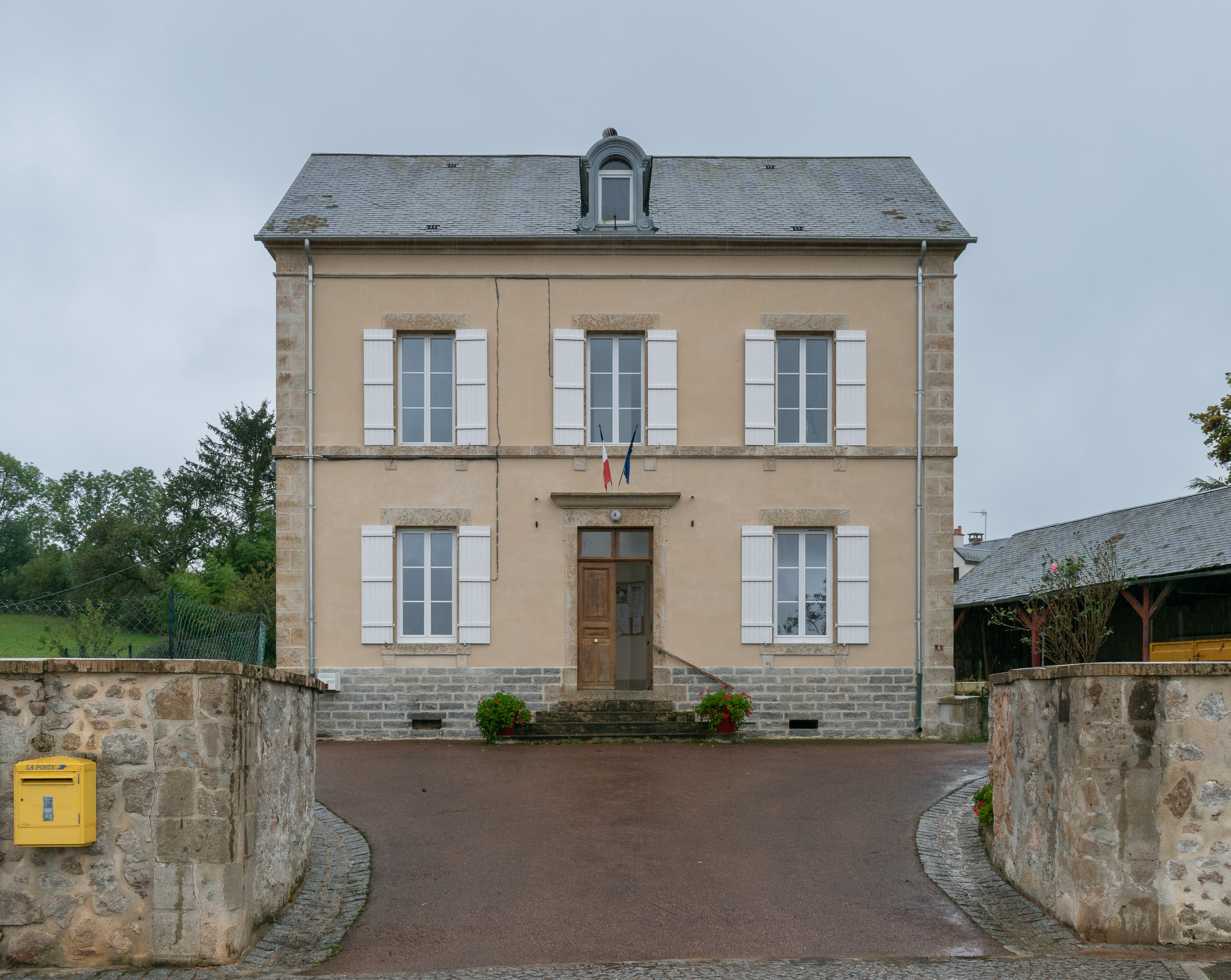
- Town hall of Dun-sur-Grandry
- Location of Dun-sur-Grandry
- Location within France Location within Bourgogne-Franche-Comté
- Coordinates: 47°05′09″N 3°47′28″E
- Country: France
- Region: Bourgogne-Franche-Comté
- Department: Nièvre
- Arrondissement: Château-Chinon (Ville)
- Canton: Château-Chinon

Government
  - Mayor (2020–2026): Christiane Maury
- Area^{1}: 11.91 km^{2} (4.60 sq mi)
- Highest elevation: 376 m (1,234 ft)
- Lowest elevation: 233 m (764 ft)
- Population (2023): 151
  - Density: 12.7/km^{2} (32.8/sq mi)
- Time zone: UTC+01:00 (CET)
  - Summer (DST): UTC+02:00 (CEST)
- INSEE/Postal code: 58107 /58110
- ^{1} French Land Register data, which excludes lakes, ponds, glaciers > 1 km^{2} (0.386 sq mi or 247 acres) and river estuaries.

Dun-sur-Grandry is a commune in the Nièvre department in central France.

== Demographics ==
Historical population
| Year | Pop. | ±% p.a. |
|---|---|---|
| 1968 | 243 | — |
| 1975 | 202 | −2.61% |
| 1982 | 178 | −1.79% |
| 1990 | 152 | −1.95% |
| 1999 | 162 | +0.71% |
| 2007 | 149 | −1.04% |
| 2012 | 167 | +2.31% |
| 2017 | 156 | −1.35% |
| 2023 | 151 | −0.54% |
Source: INSEE

== See also ==
- Communes of the Nièvre department
- Parc naturel régional du Morvan
