= Montigny-en-Morvan =

- Commune
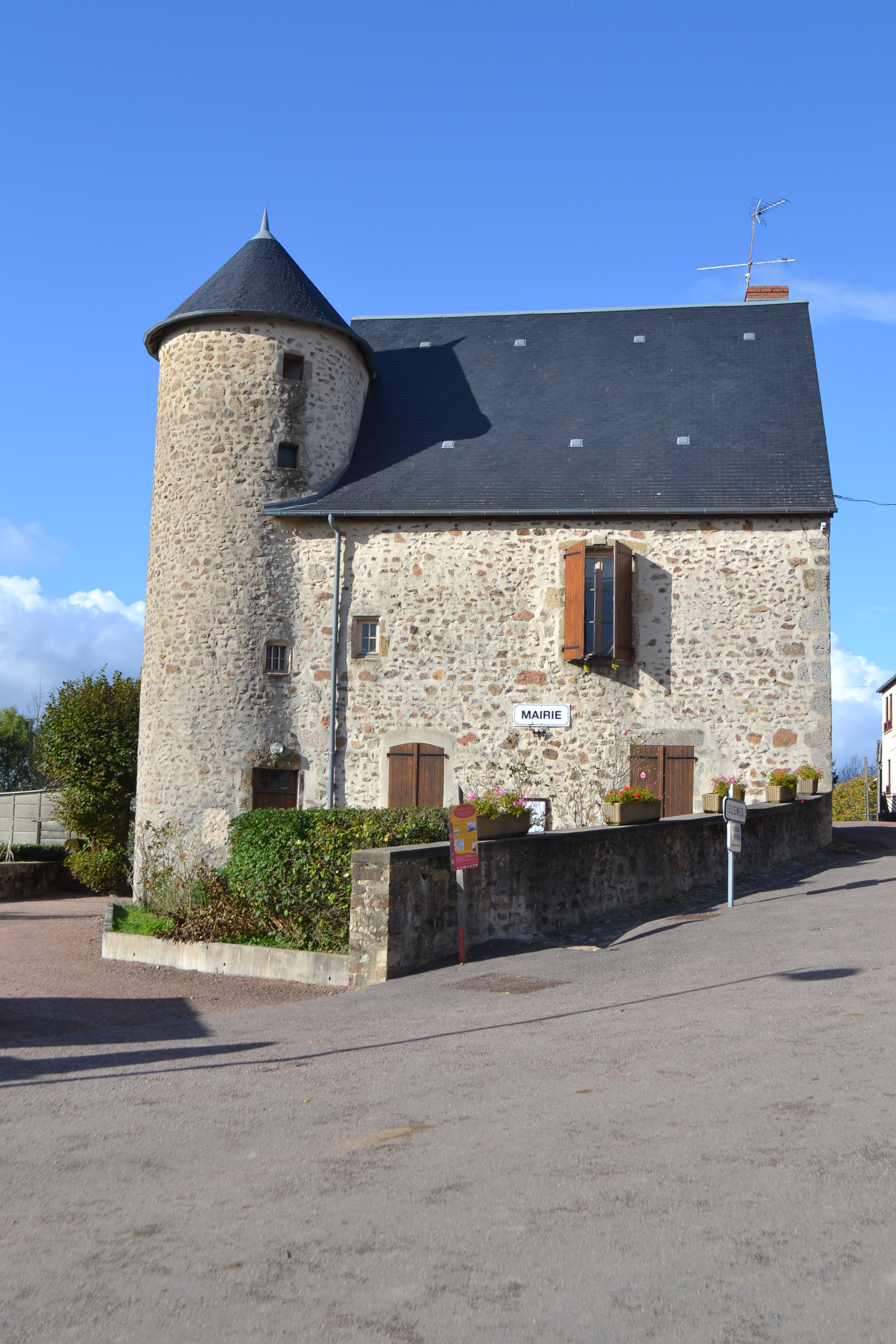
- Town hall
- Location of Montigny-en-Morvan
- Location within France Location within Bourgogne-Franche-Comté
- Coordinates: 47°08′43″N 3°51′20″E
- Country: France
- Region: Bourgogne-Franche-Comté
- Department: Nièvre
- Arrondissement: Château-Chinon
- Canton: Château-Chinon
- Intercommunality: Morvan Sommets et Grands Lacs

Government
  - Mayor (2020–2026): Éric Gallois
- Area^{1}: 20.09 km^{2} (7.76 sq mi)
- Highest elevation: 521 m (1,709 ft)
- Lowest elevation: 265 m (869 ft)
- Population (2023): 308
  - Density: 15.3/km^{2} (39.7/sq mi)
- Time zone: UTC+01:00 (CET)
  - Summer (DST): UTC+02:00 (CEST)
- INSEE/Postal code: 58177 /58120
- Website: montigny-en-morvan.fr
- ^{1} French Land Register data, which excludes lakes, ponds, glaciers > 1 km^{2} (0.386 sq mi or 247 acres) and river estuaries.

Montigny-en-Morvan (French pronunciation: [mɔ̃tiɲi ɑ̃ mɔʁvɑ̃]; lit. 'Montigny-in-Morvan') or simply Montigny is a rural commune in the Nièvre department in central France. It is located within Morvan Regional Natural Park, encompassing part of the artificial Lac de Pannecière.

== See also ==
- Communes of the Nièvre department
- Morvan Regional Natural Park
