= Saint-Péreuse =

- Commune
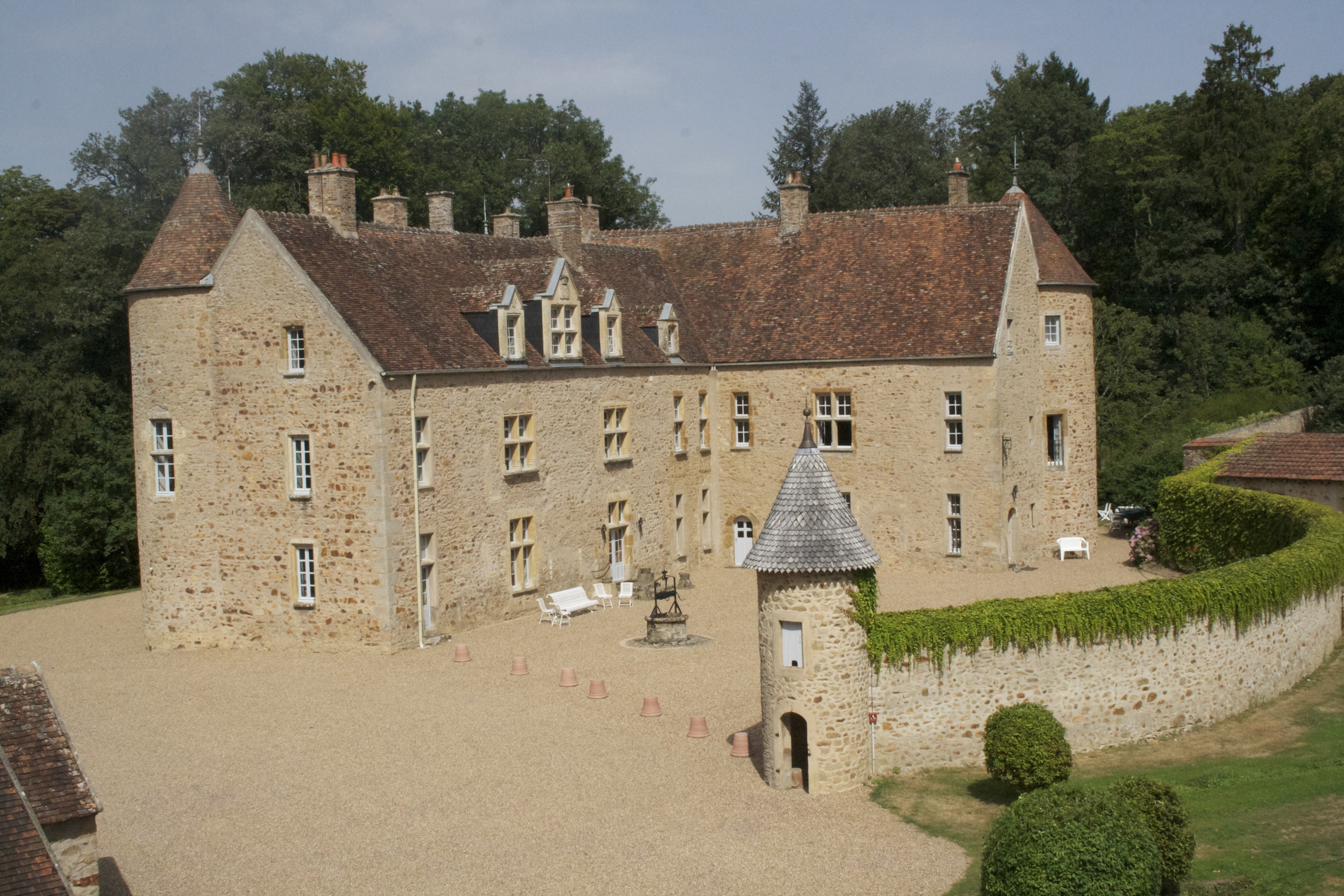
- Château de Besne
- Location of Saint-Péreuse
- Location within France Location within Bourgogne-Franche-Comté
- Coordinates: 47°04′12″N 3°48′19″E
- Country: France
- Region: Bourgogne-Franche-Comté
- Department: Nièvre
- Arrondissement: Château-Chinon
- Canton: Château-Chinon
- Intercommunality: CC Morvan Sommets et Grands Lacs

Government
  - Mayor (2020–2026): Chantal Bernier
- Area^{1}: 16.45 km^{2} (6.35 sq mi)
- Elevation: 355 m (1,165 ft)
- Highest elevation: 432 m (1,417 ft)
- Lowest elevation: 230 m (750 ft)
- Population (2023): 199
  - Density: 12.1/km^{2} (31.3/sq mi)
- Time zone: UTC+01:00 (CET)
  - Summer (DST): UTC+02:00 (CEST)
- INSEE/Postal code: 58262 /58110
- ^{1} French Land Register data, which excludes lakes, ponds, glaciers > 1 km^{2} (0.386 sq mi or 247 acres) and river estuaries.

Saint-Péreuse (French pronunciation: [sɛ̃ peʁøz]) is a commune in the Nièvre department in central France.

== See also ==
- Communes of the Nièvre department
- Parc naturel régional du Morvan
