= Moux-en-Morvan =

- Commune
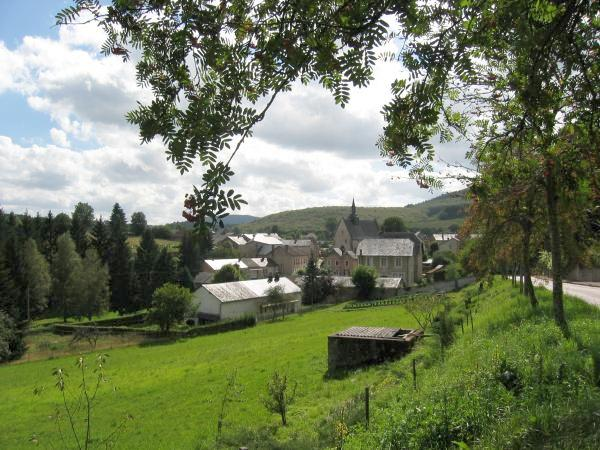
- A general view of Moux

- Coat of arms
- Location of Moux-en-Morvan
- Location within France Location within Bourgogne-Franche-Comté
- Coordinates: 47°10′19″N 4°09′14″E
- Country: France
- Region: Bourgogne-Franche-Comté
- Department: Nièvre
- Arrondissement: Château-Chinon (Ville)
- Canton: Château-Chinon
- Intercommunality: CC Morvan Sommets et Grands Lacs

Government
  - Mayor (2020–2026): Pascal Rateau
- Area^{1}: 42.51 km^{2} (16.41 sq mi)
- Highest elevation: 707 m (2,320 ft)
- Lowest elevation: 394 m (1,293 ft)
- Population (2023): 538
  - Density: 12.7/km^{2} (32.8/sq mi)
- Demonym: Mouxois
- Time zone: UTC+01:00 (CET)
  - Summer (DST): UTC+02:00 (CEST)
- INSEE/Postal code: 58185 /58230
- ^{1} French Land Register data, which excludes lakes, ponds, glaciers > 1 km^{2} (0.386 sq mi or 247 acres) and river estuaries.

Moux-en-Morvan (French pronunciation: [mu ɑ̃ mɔʁvɑ̃], lit. 'Moux-in-Morvan', Burgundian: Mô, before 1988: Moux) is a rural commune in the east of the Nièvre department in the Bourgogne-Franche-Comté region in central-east France.

Bordering both Côte-d'Or and Saône-et-Loire, it is part of Morvan Regional Natural Park.

== See also ==
- Communes of the Nièvre department
- Morvan Regional Natural Park
