= Saint-Agnan-en-Morvan =

- Commune
- Location of Saint-Agnan-en-Morvan
- Location within France Location within Bourgogne-Franche-Comté
- Coordinates: 47°19′09″N 4°05′45″E
- Country: France
- Region: Bourgogne-Franche-Comté
- Department: Nièvre
- Arrondissement: Château-Chinon (Ville)
- Canton: Château-Chinon
- Intercommunality: CC Morvan Sommets et Grands Lacs

Government
  - Mayor (2020–2026): Georges Flecq
- Area^{1}: 23.87 km^{2} (9.22 sq mi)
- Highest elevation: 630 m (2,070 ft)
- Lowest elevation: 437 m (1,434 ft)
- Population (2023): 143
  - Density: 5.99/km^{2} (15.5/sq mi)
- Time zone: UTC+01:00 (CET)
  - Summer (DST): UTC+02:00 (CEST)
- INSEE/Postal code: 58226 /58230
- ^{1} French Land Register data, which excludes lakes, ponds, glaciers > 1 km^{2} (0.386 sq mi or 247 acres) and river estuaries.

Saint-Agnan-en-Morvan (before 2025: Saint-Agnan, French pronunciation: [sɛ̃.t‿aɲɑ̃]) is a commune in the Nièvre department in central France.

== See also ==
- Communes of the Nièvre department
- Parc naturel régional du Morvan
