= Ouroux-en-Morvan =

- Commune
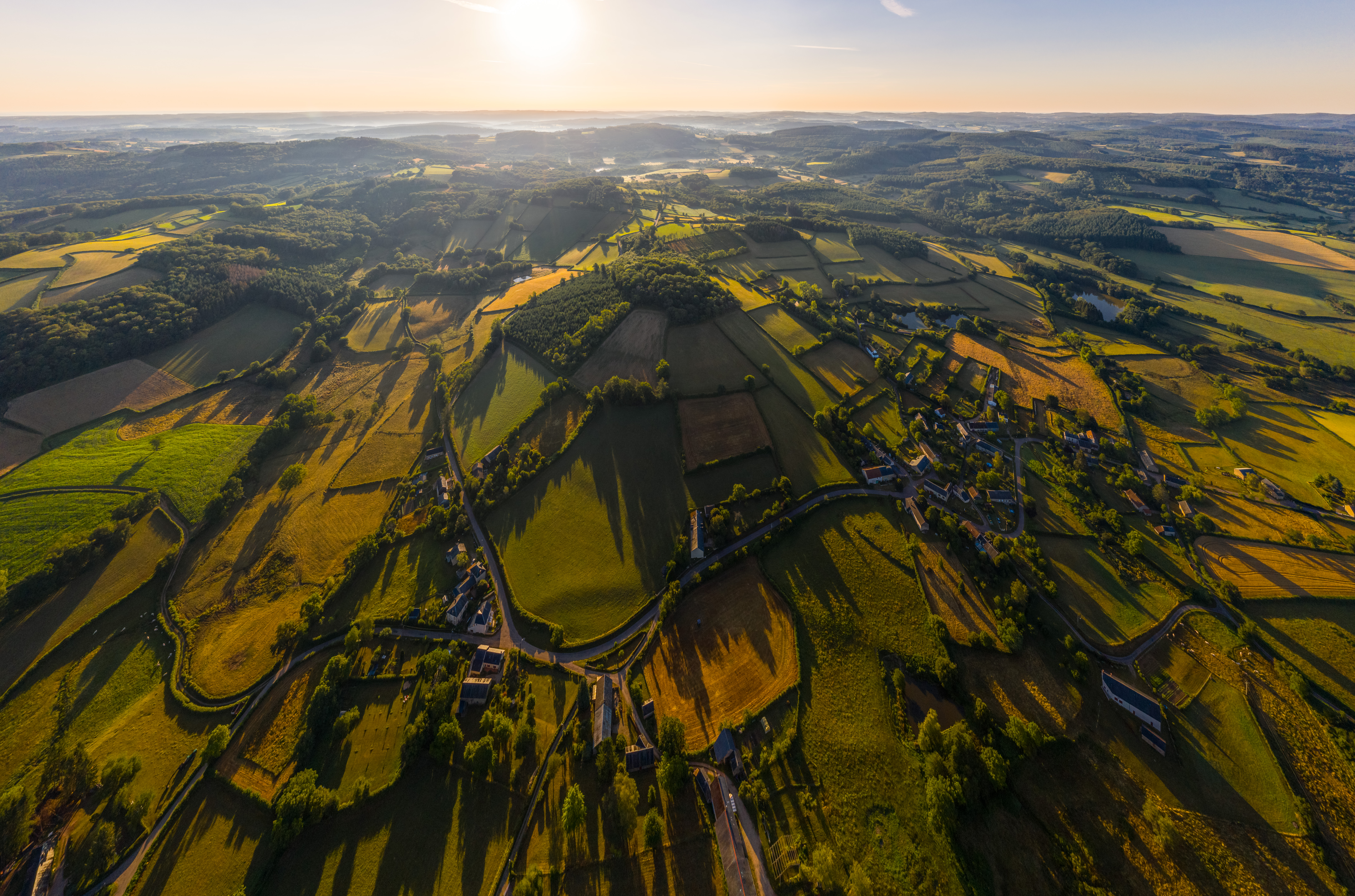
- Aerial view of Ouroux-en-Morvan
- Location of Ouroux-en-Morvan
- Location within France Location within Bourgogne-Franche-Comté
- Coordinates: 47°11′11″N 3°56′47″E
- Country: France
- Region: Bourgogne-Franche-Comté
- Department: Nièvre
- Arrondissement: Château-Chinon (Ville)
- Canton: Château-Chinon
- Intercommunality: CC Morvan Sommets et Grands Lacs

Government
  - Mayor (2020–2026): Florence Berlo
- Area^{1}: 60.56 km^{2} (23.38 sq mi)
- Highest elevation: 668 m (2,192 ft)
- Lowest elevation: 324 m (1,063 ft)
- Population (2023): 599
  - Density: 9.89/km^{2} (25.6/sq mi)
- Time zone: UTC+01:00 (CET)
  - Summer (DST): UTC+02:00 (CEST)
- INSEE/Postal code: 58205 /58230
- Website: www.mairieourouxenmorvan.fr
- ^{1} French Land Register data, which excludes lakes, ponds, glaciers > 1 km^{2} (0.386 sq mi or 247 acres) and river estuaries.

Ouroux-en-Morvan (French pronunciation: [uʁu ɑ̃ mɔʁvɑ̃]; lit. 'Ouroux-in-Morvan'; Burgundian: Orrou) or simply Ouroux is a rural commune in the Nièvre department in the Bourgogne-Franche-Comté region in central France. As of 2023, the population of the commune was 599.

== Geography ==
Ouroux-en-Morvan covers an area of 60.56 km^{2} (23.38 sq mi). It is part of Morvan Regional Natural Park.

== History ==
Ouroux-en-Morvan played a central role in World War II in the Morvan. It was the headquarters of the French Resistance in Nièvre; as such it became the "clandestine prefecture" of Nièvre in the summer of 1944.

== Demography ==
Historical population
Year	Pop.	±% p.a.
1968	1,146	—
1975	1,051	−1.23%
1982	1,010	−0.57%
1990	838	−2.31%
1999	670	−2.46%
2007	665	−0.09%
2012	653	−0.36%
2017	617	−1.13%
2023	599	−0.49%
Source: INSEE

== Twin town ==
Ouroux-en-Morvan has been twinned with Cullera, Spain since 1979.

== Gallery ==
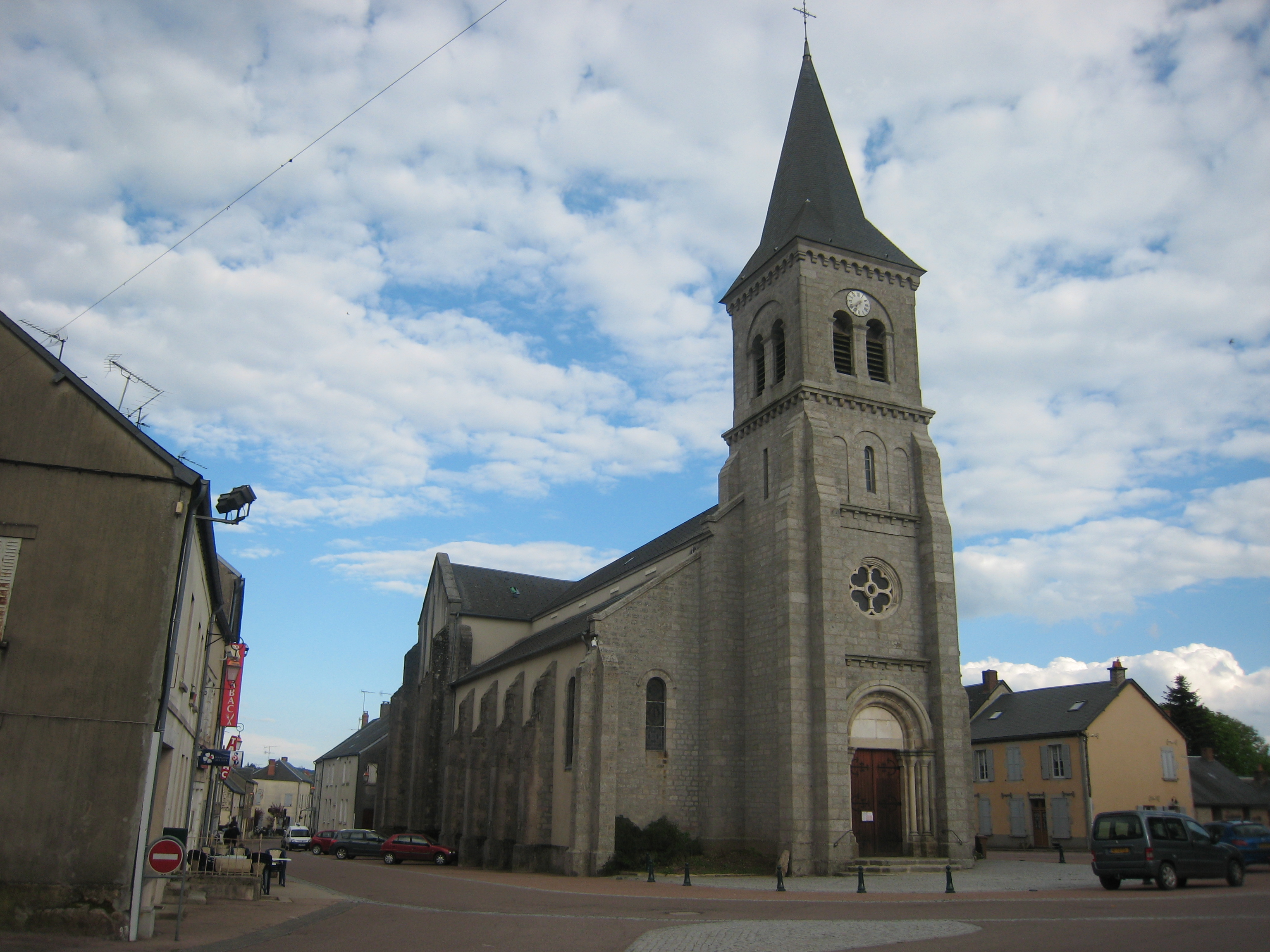
Église Saint-Germain

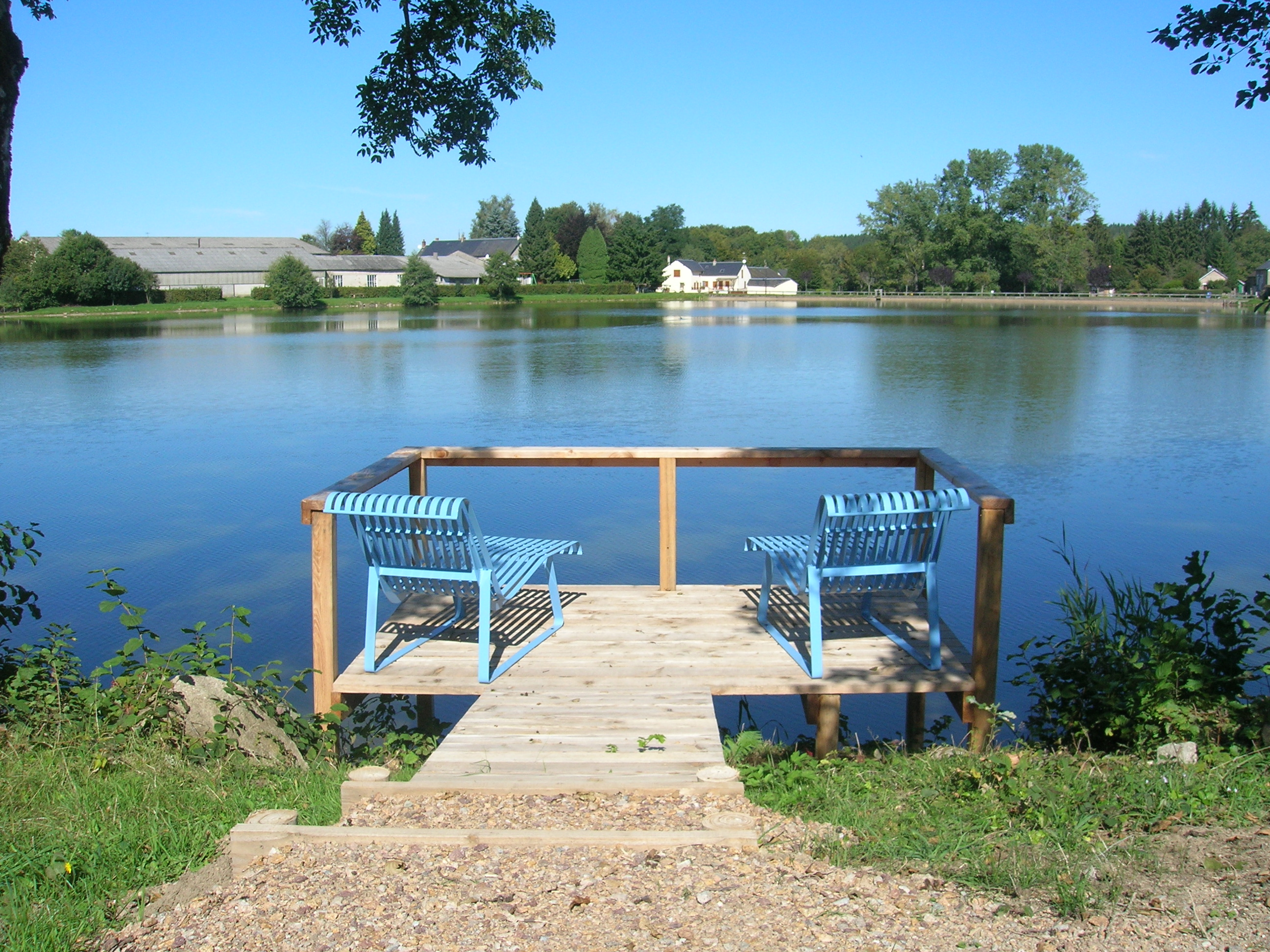
Étang d'Ouroux-en-Morvan

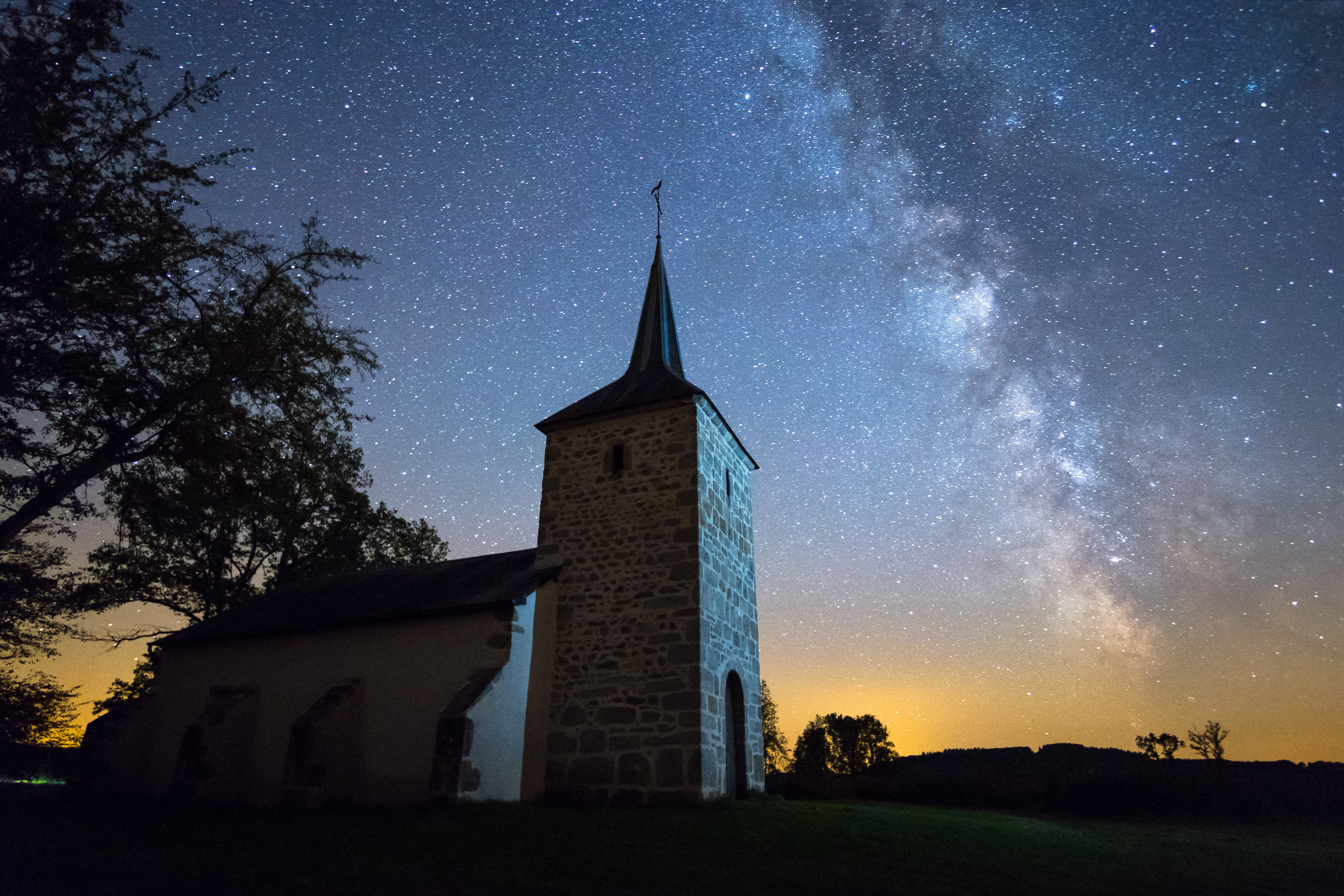
Chapelle Savault

== See also ==
- Communes of the Nièvre department
