= Gouloux =

- Commune
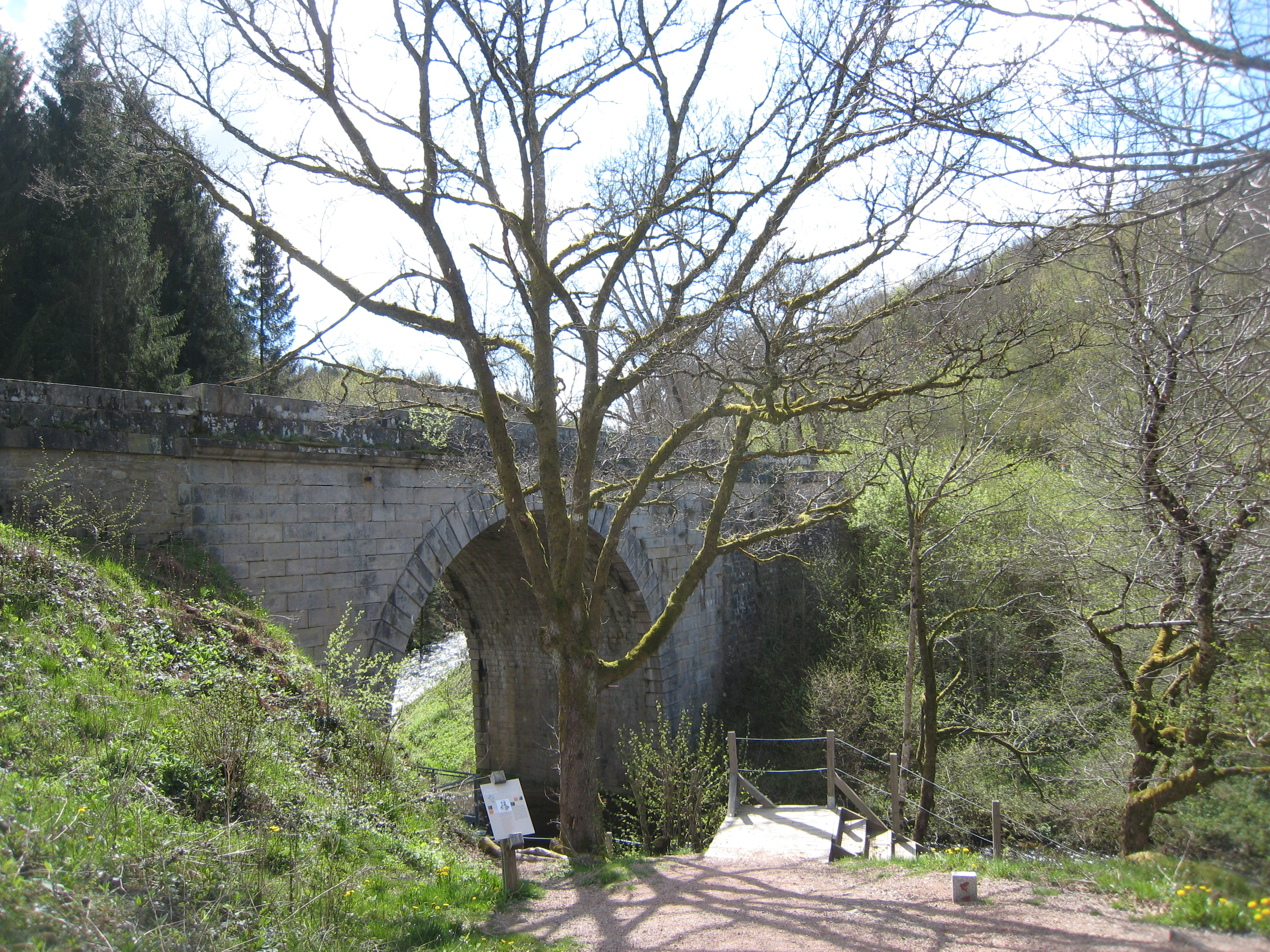
- The bridge at Gouloux
- Location of Gouloux
- Location within France Location within Bourgogne-Franche-Comté
- Coordinates: 47°14′25″N 4°04′41″E
- Country: France
- Region: Bourgogne-Franche-Comté
- Department: Nièvre
- Arrondissement: Château-Chinon (Ville)
- Canton: Château-Chinon

Government
  - Mayor (2020–2026): Christiane Gadrey
- Area^{1}: 21.94 km^{2} (8.47 sq mi)
- Highest elevation: 702 m (2,303 ft)
- Lowest elevation: 462 m (1,516 ft)
- Population (2023): 164
  - Density: 7.47/km^{2} (19.4/sq mi)
- Time zone: UTC+01:00 (CET)
  - Summer (DST): UTC+02:00 (CEST)
- INSEE/Postal code: 58129 /58230
- ^{1} French Land Register data, which excludes lakes, ponds, glaciers > 1 km^{2} (0.386 sq mi or 247 acres) and river estuaries.

Gouloux (French pronunciation: [ɡulu]) is a commune in the Nièvre department in central France.

== See also ==
- Communes of the Nièvre department
- Parc naturel régional du Morvan
