= Corancy =

- Commune
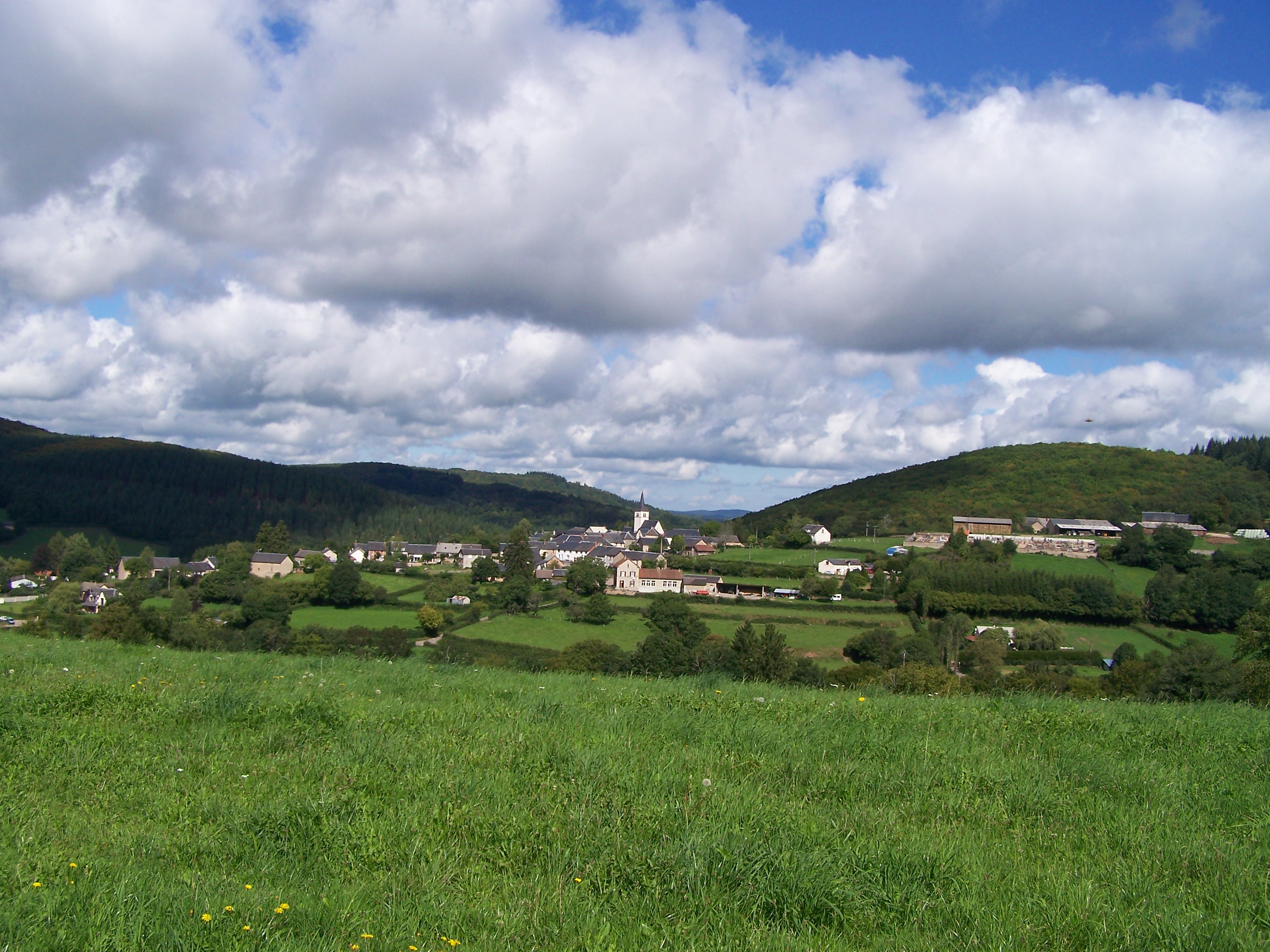
- A general view of Corancy

- Coat of arms
- Location of Corancy
- Location within France Location within Bourgogne-Franche-Comté
- Coordinates: 47°06′08″N 3°56′56″E
- Country: France
- Region: Bourgogne-Franche-Comté
- Department: Nièvre
- Arrondissement: Château-Chinon (Ville)
- Canton: Château-Chinon

Government
  - Mayor (2020–2026): Martine Daoust
- Area^{1}: 30.15 km^{2} (11.64 sq mi)
- Highest elevation: 730 m (2,400 ft)
- Lowest elevation: 322 m (1,056 ft)
- Population (2023): 275
  - Density: 9.12/km^{2} (23.6/sq mi)
- Time zone: UTC+01:00 (CET)
  - Summer (DST): UTC+02:00 (CEST)
- INSEE/Postal code: 58082 /58120
- ^{1} French Land Register data, which excludes lakes, ponds, glaciers > 1 km^{2} (0.386 sq mi or 247 acres) and river estuaries.

Corancy (French pronunciation: [kɔʁɑ̃si]) is a commune in the Nièvre department in central France.

== See also ==
- Communes of the Nièvre department
- Parc naturel régional du Morvan
