= Limanton =

- Commune
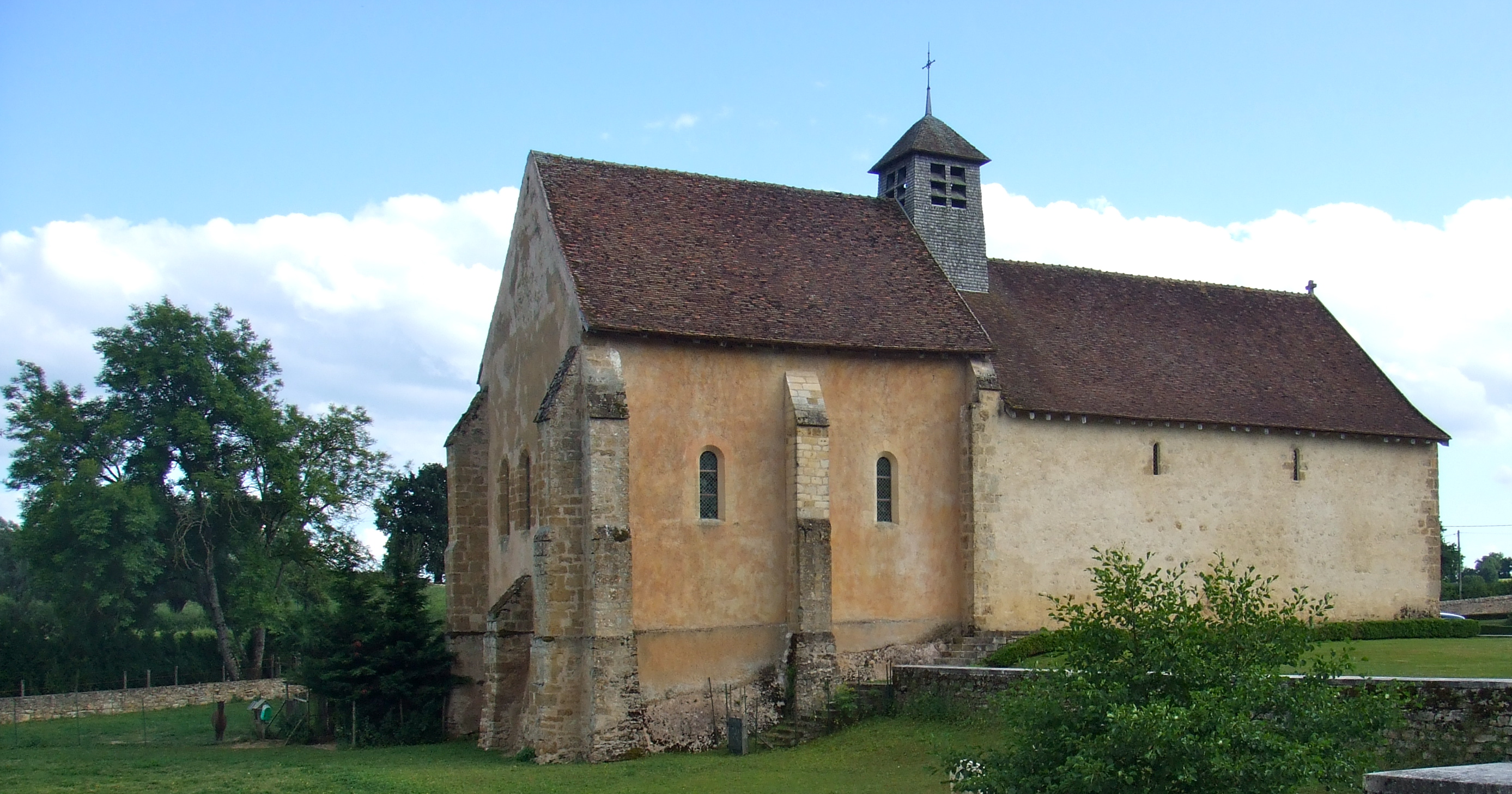
- The old church of Anizy, in Limanton
- Location of Limanton
- Location within France Location within Bourgogne-Franche-Comté
- Coordinates: 46°59′27″N 3°44′21″E
- Country: France
- Region: Bourgogne-Franche-Comté
- Department: Nièvre
- Arrondissement: Château-Chinon (Ville)
- Canton: Château-Chinon

Government
  - Mayor (2020–2026): Marie-Agnès Michot
- Area^{1}: 46.93 km^{2} (18.12 sq mi)
- Highest elevation: 297 m (974 ft)
- Lowest elevation: 204 m (669 ft)
- Population (2023): 242
  - Density: 5.16/km^{2} (13.4/sq mi)
- Time zone: UTC+01:00 (CET)
  - Summer (DST): UTC+02:00 (CEST)
- INSEE/Postal code: 58142 /58290
- ^{1} French Land Register data, which excludes lakes, ponds, glaciers > 1 km^{2} (0.386 sq mi or 247 acres) and river estuaries.

Limanton (French pronunciation: [limɑ̃tɔ̃]) is a commune in the Nièvre department in central France.

== See also ==
- Communes of the Nièvre department
