= Arleuf =

- Commune
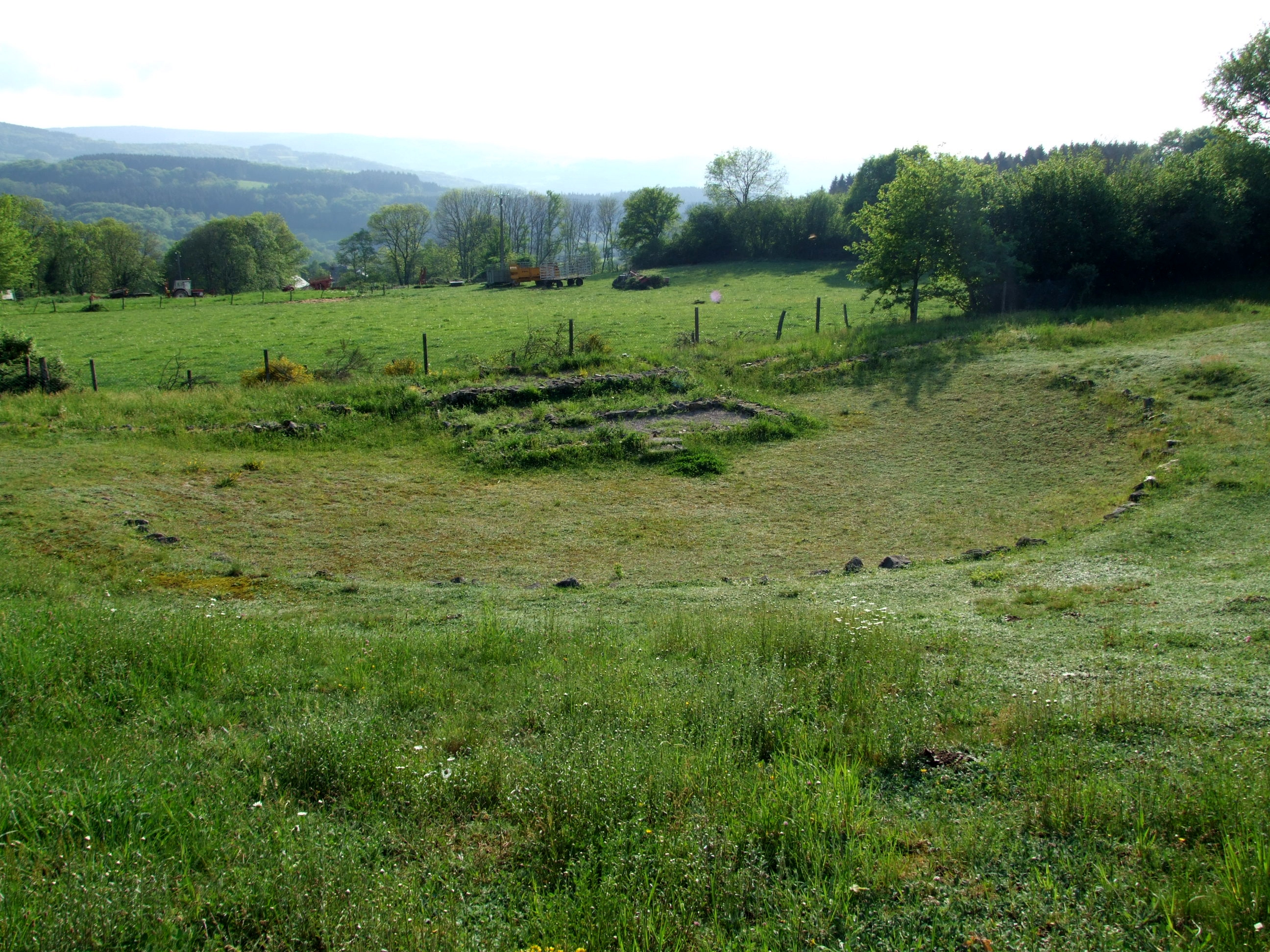
- Gallo Roman theatre des Bardeaux
- Location of Arleuf
- Location within France Location within Bourgogne-Franche-Comté
- Coordinates: 47°02′44″N 4°01′24″E
- Country: France
- Region: Bourgogne-Franche-Comté
- Department: Nièvre
- Arrondissement: Château-Chinon
- Canton: Château-Chinon
- Intercommunality: CC Morvan Sommets Grands Lacs

Government
  - Mayor (2020–2026): Jean-Luc Blandin
- Area^{1}: 59.77 km^{2} (23.08 sq mi)
- Highest elevation: 857 m (2,812 ft)
- Lowest elevation: 402 m (1,319 ft)
- Population (2023): 637
  - Density: 10.7/km^{2} (27.6/sq mi)
- Time zone: UTC+01:00 (CET)
  - Summer (DST): UTC+02:00 (CEST)
- INSEE/Postal code: 58010 /58430
- ^{1} French Land Register data, which excludes lakes, ponds, glaciers > 1 km^{2} (0.386 sq mi or 247 acres) and river estuaries.

Arleuf (French pronunciation: [aʁlø]) is a commune in the Nièvre department in central France.

== Population ==
Historical population
Year	Pop.	±% p.a.
1968	1,166	—
1975	1,019	−1.91%
1982	864	−2.33%
1990	863	−0.01%
1999	800	−0.84%
2007	782	−0.28%
2012	824	+1.05%
2017	746	−1.97%
2023	637	−2.60%
Source: INSEE

== See also ==
- Communes of the Nièvre department
- Parc naturel régional du Morvan
