= Aunay-en-Bazois =

- Commune
- Location of Aunay-en-Bazois
- Location within France Location within Bourgogne-Franche-Comté
- Coordinates: 47°06′58″N 3°41′57″E
- Country: France
- Region: Bourgogne-Franche-Comté
- Department: Nièvre
- Arrondissement: Château-Chinon (Ville)
- Canton: Château-Chinon
- Intercommunality: CC Bazois Loire Morvan

Government
  - Mayor (2020–2026): Patrick Chaussat
- Area^{1}: 45.16 km^{2} (17.44 sq mi)
- Highest elevation: 396 m (1,299 ft)
- Lowest elevation: 232 m (761 ft)
- Population (2023): 231
  - Density: 5.12/km^{2} (13.2/sq mi)
- Time zone: UTC+01:00 (CET)
  - Summer (DST): UTC+02:00 (CEST)
- INSEE/Postal code: 58017 /58110
- ^{1} French Land Register data, which excludes lakes, ponds, glaciers > 1 km^{2} (0.386 sq mi or 247 acres) and river estuaries.

Aunay-en-Bazois (French pronunciation: [onɛ ɑ̃ bazwa]) is a commune in the Nièvre department in central France.

== Population ==
Historical population
Year	Pop.	±% p.a.
1968	503	—
1975	424	−2.41%
1982	379	−1.59%
1990	315	−2.29%
1999	292	−0.84%
2007	277	−0.66%
2012	249	−2.11%
2017	228	−1.75%
2023	231	+0.22%
Source: INSEE

== See also ==
- Communes of the Nièvre department
