= Saint-Hilaire-en-Morvan =

- Commune
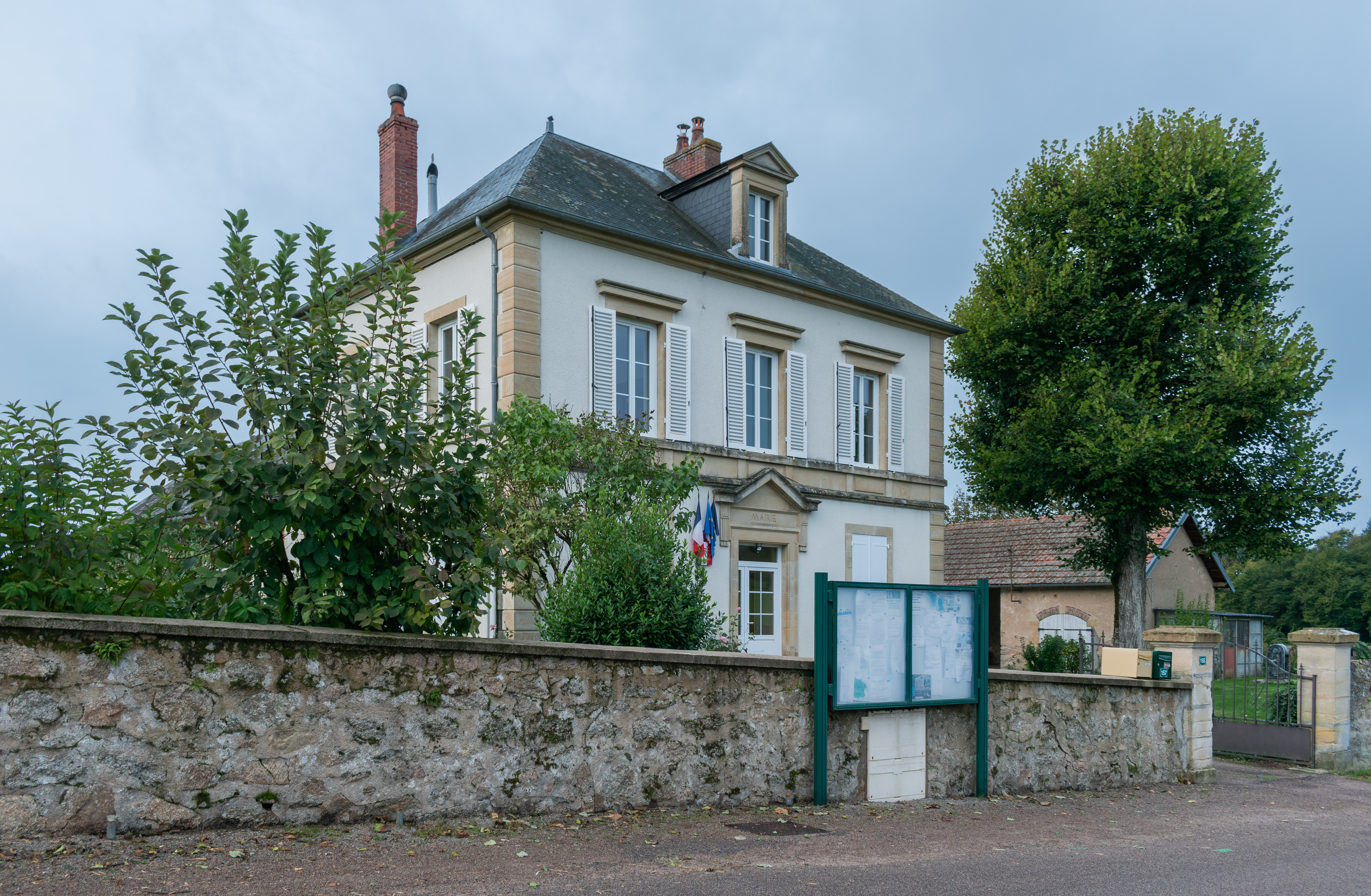
- Town hall of St-Hilaire-en-Morvan
- Location of Saint-Hilaire-en-Morvan
- Location within France Location within Bourgogne-Franche-Comté
- Coordinates: 47°04′41″N 3°53′20″E
- Country: France
- Region: Bourgogne-Franche-Comté
- Department: Nièvre
- Arrondissement: Château-Chinon
- Canton: Château-Chinon
- Intercommunality: CC Morvan Sommets et Grands Lacs

Government
  - Mayor (2020–2026): Abel Moura
- Area^{1}: 21.30 km^{2} (8.22 sq mi)
- Highest elevation: 530 m (1,740 ft)
- Lowest elevation: 283 m (928 ft)
- Population (2023): 221
  - Density: 10.4/km^{2} (26.9/sq mi)
- Time zone: UTC+01:00 (CET)
  - Summer (DST): UTC+02:00 (CEST)
- INSEE/Postal code: 58244 /58120
- ^{1} French Land Register data, which excludes lakes, ponds, glaciers > 1 km^{2} (0.386 sq mi or 247 acres) and river estuaries.

Saint-Hilaire-en-Morvan (French pronunciation: [sɛ̃t‿ilɛʁ ɑ̃ mɔʁvɑ̃], lit. 'Saint-Hilaire in Morvan') is a commune in the Nièvre department in central France.

== See also ==
- Communes of the Nièvre department
- Parc naturel régional du Morvan
