= Tamnay-en-Bazois =

- Commune
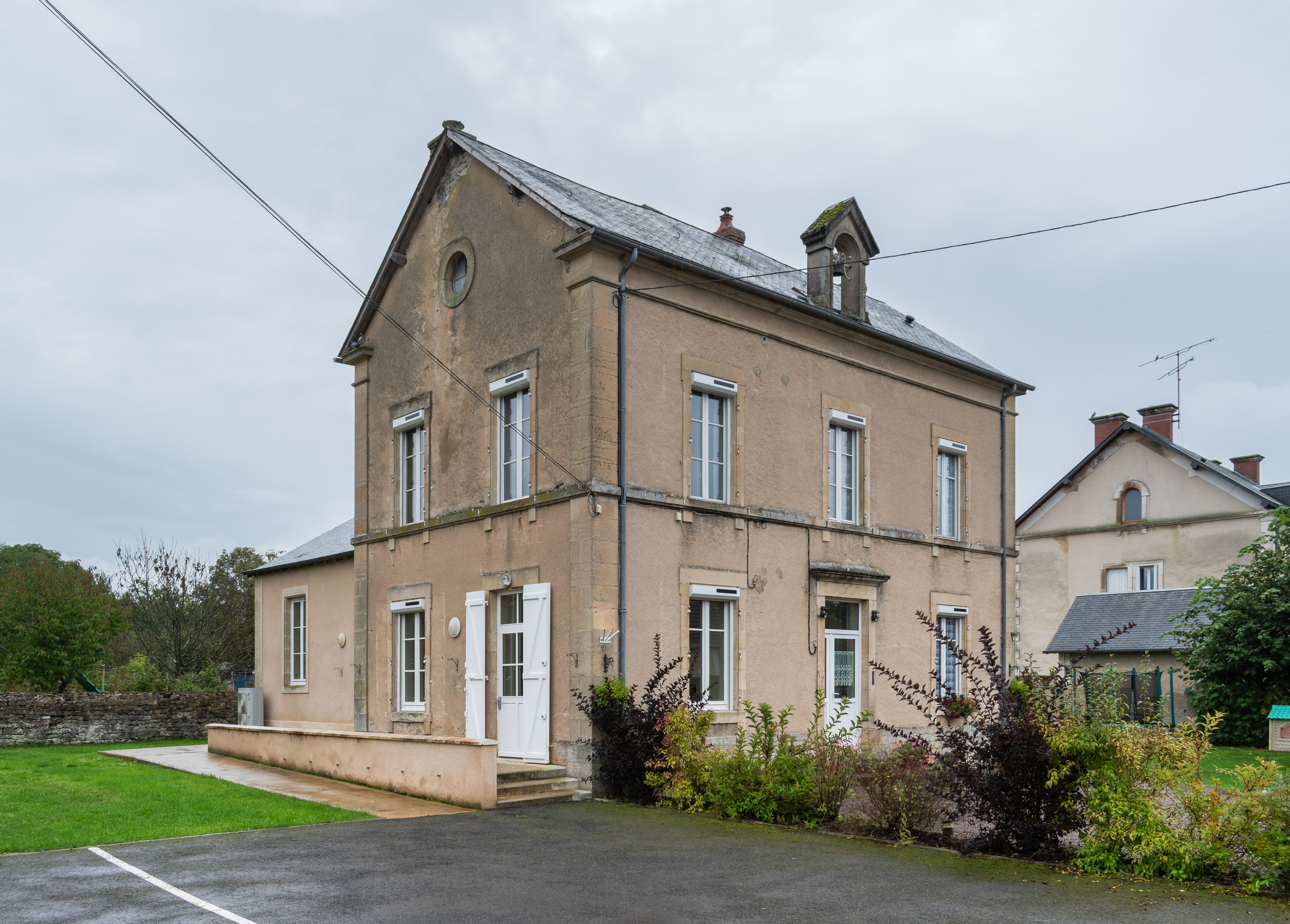
- Town hall of Tamnay-en-Bazois
- Location of Tamnay-en-Bazois
- Location within France Location within Bourgogne-Franche-Comté
- Coordinates: 47°03′21″N 3°43′17″E
- Country: France
- Region: Bourgogne-Franche-Comté
- Department: Nièvre
- Arrondissement: Château-Chinon (Ville)
- Canton: Château-Chinon

Government
  - Mayor (2020–2026): Christian Simonet
- Area^{1}: 10.53 km^{2} (4.07 sq mi)
- Highest elevation: 305 m (1,001 ft)
- Lowest elevation: 219 m (719 ft)
- Population (2023): 171
  - Density: 16.2/km^{2} (42.1/sq mi)
- Time zone: UTC+01:00 (CET)
  - Summer (DST): UTC+02:00 (CEST)
- INSEE/Postal code: 58285 /58110
- ^{1} French Land Register data, which excludes lakes, ponds, glaciers > 1 km^{2} (0.386 sq mi or 247 acres) and river estuaries.

Tamnay-en-Bazois is a commune in the Nièvre department in central France.

== See also ==
- Communes of the Nièvre department
