= Glux-en-Glenne =

- Commune
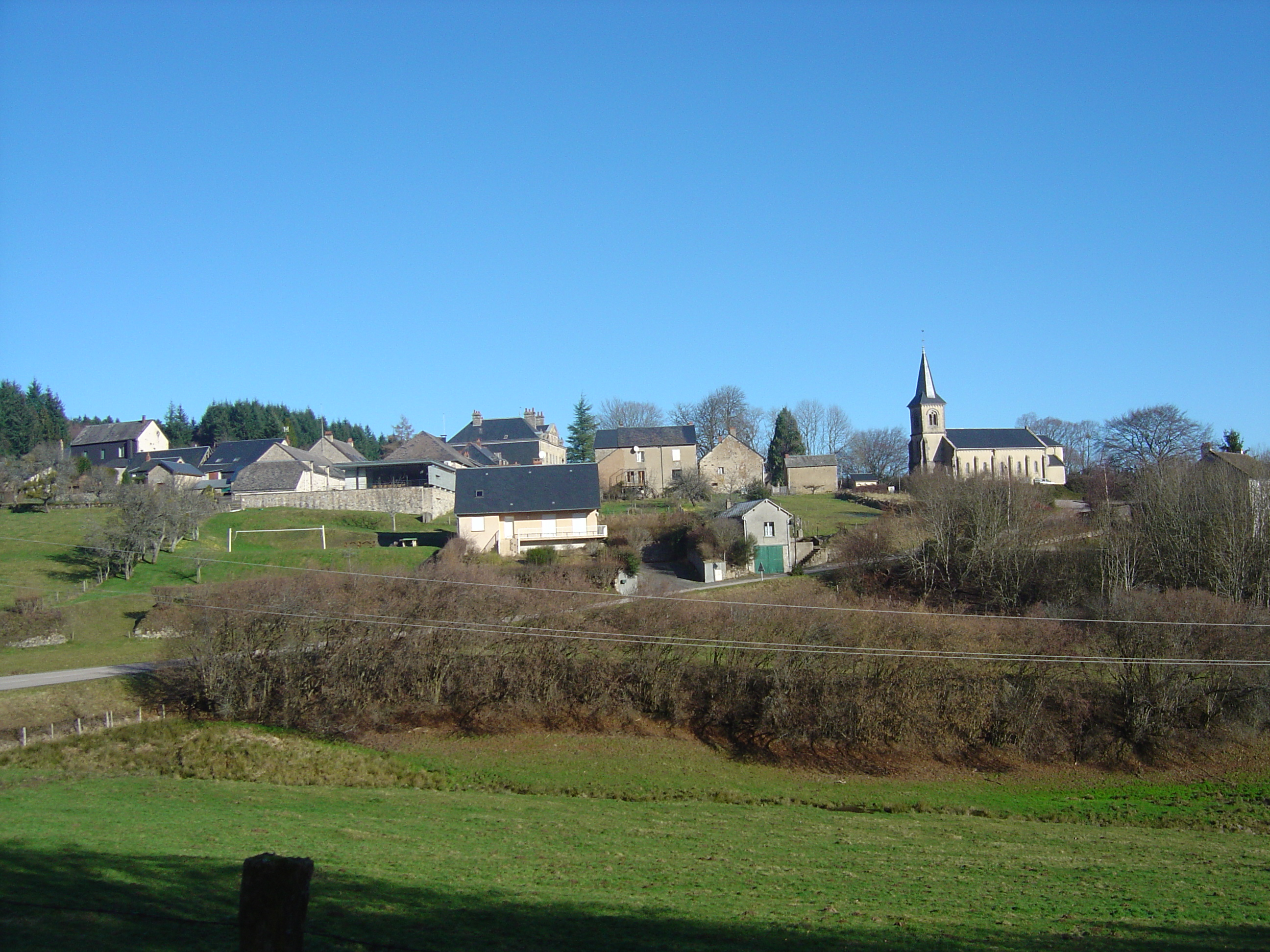
- A general view of Glux-en-Glenne
- Location of Glux-en-Glenne
- Location within France Location within Bourgogne-Franche-Comté
- Coordinates: 46°57′26″N 4°01′54″E
- Country: France
- Region: Bourgogne-Franche-Comté
- Department: Nièvre
- Arrondissement: Château-Chinon
- Canton: Château-Chinon
- Intercommunality: CC Morvan Sommets et Grands Lacs

Government
  - Mayor (2020–2026): René Blanchot
- Area^{1}: 22.06 km^{2} (8.52 sq mi)
- Highest elevation: 855 m (2,805 ft)
- Lowest elevation: 409 m (1,342 ft)
- Population (2023): 87
  - Density: 3.9/km^{2} (10/sq mi)
- Demonym: Gluxois
- Time zone: UTC+01:00 (CET)
  - Summer (DST): UTC+02:00 (CEST)
- INSEE/Postal code: 58128 /58370
- Website: www.mairie-glux-en-glenne.fr
- ^{1} French Land Register data, which excludes lakes, ponds, glaciers > 1 km^{2} (0.386 sq mi or 247 acres) and river estuaries.

Glux-en-Glenne (French pronunciation: [ɡly ɑ̃ ɡlɛn]) or simply Glux is a rural commune in the Nièvre department in central France. It is on the departmental border with Saône-et-Loire.

== History ==
On 31 May 1944, amid the German occupation of France, the Gestapo arrested Camille Barnet, abbot of Glux-en-Glenne and neighbouring Saint-Prix, accused of having supported the French Resistance in the Morvan. He was tortured to death until 9 June.

== Demographics ==
As of 2022, the estimated population was 88.

== See also ==
- Communes of the Nièvre department
- Morvan Regional Natural Park
