= Chaumard =

- Commune
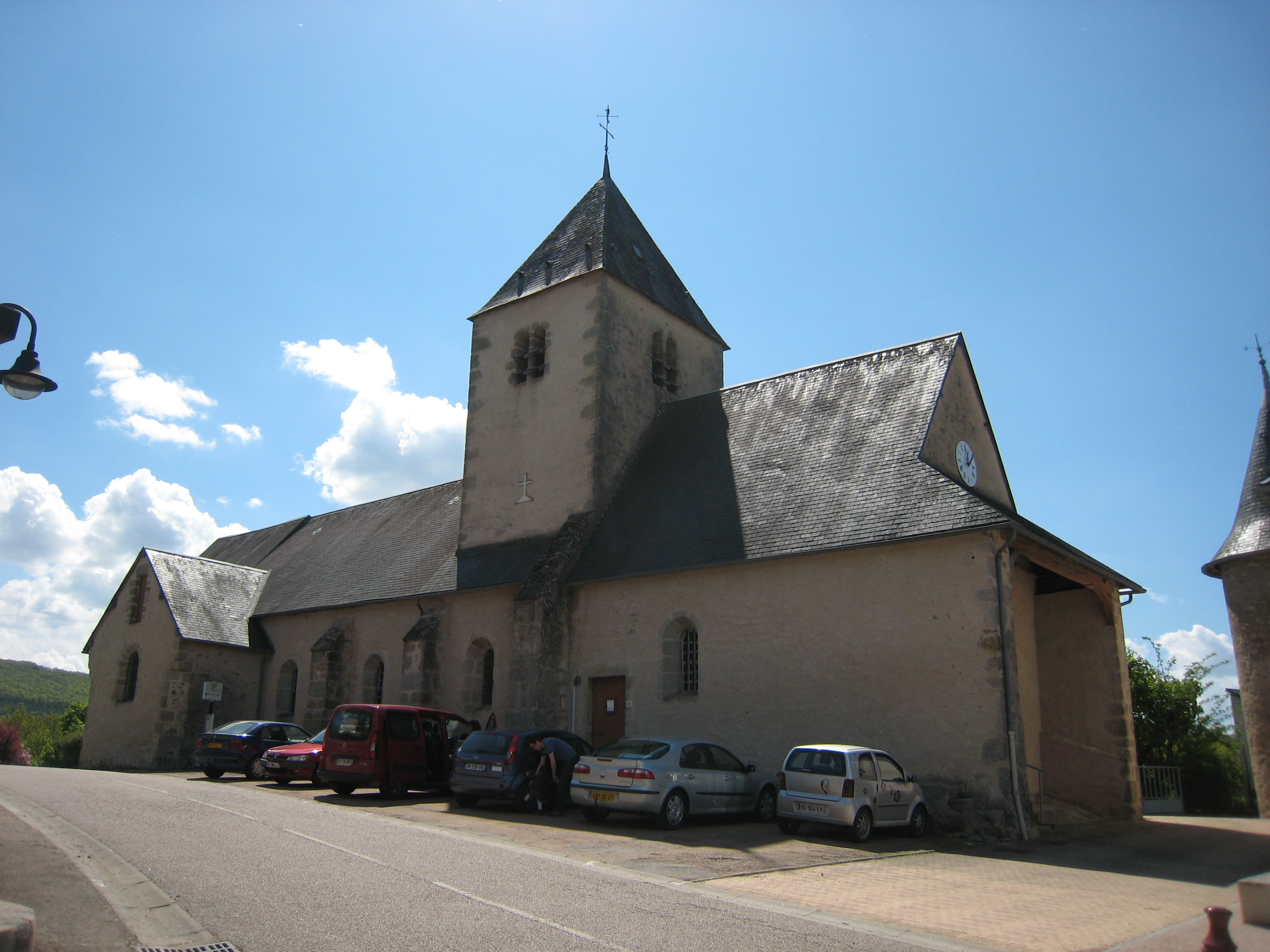
- The church in Chaumard
- Location of Chaumard
- Location within France Location within Bourgogne-Franche-Comté
- Coordinates: 47°08′43″N 3°54′46″E
- Country: France
- Region: Bourgogne-Franche-Comté
- Department: Nièvre
- Arrondissement: Château-Chinon (Ville)
- Canton: Château-Chinon
- Intercommunality: CC Morvan Sommets et Grands Lacs

Government
  - Mayor (2020–2026): Jean-Pierre Billard
- Area^{1}: 16.15 km^{2} (6.24 sq mi)
- Highest elevation: 597 m (1,959 ft)
- Lowest elevation: 277 m (909 ft)
- Population (2023): 192
  - Density: 11.9/km^{2} (30.8/sq mi)
- Demonym: Chaumardois
- Time zone: UTC+01:00 (CET)
  - Summer (DST): UTC+02:00 (CEST)
- INSEE/Postal code: 58068 /58120
- ^{1} French Land Register data, which excludes lakes, ponds, glaciers > 1 km^{2} (0.386 sq mi or 247 acres) and river estuaries.

Chaumard (French pronunciation: [ʃomaʁ]) is a rural commune in the eastern part of the Nièvre department in the Bourgogne-Franche-Comté region in central France. It is located within Morvan Regional Natural Park, encompassing part of the artificial Lac de Pannecière.

== History ==
On 31 July 1944 amid World War II and the German occupation of France, 22 members of the French Resistance were killed by German soldiers during a raid in the Bois de Chaumard, a local forest in which they were hiding.

== Demographics ==
As of 2021, the estimated population was 200. The village has a few amenities catering to the daily needs of its inhabitants.

== See also ==
- Communes of the Nièvre department
- Morvan Regional Natural Park
