= Lavault-de-Frétoy =

- Commune
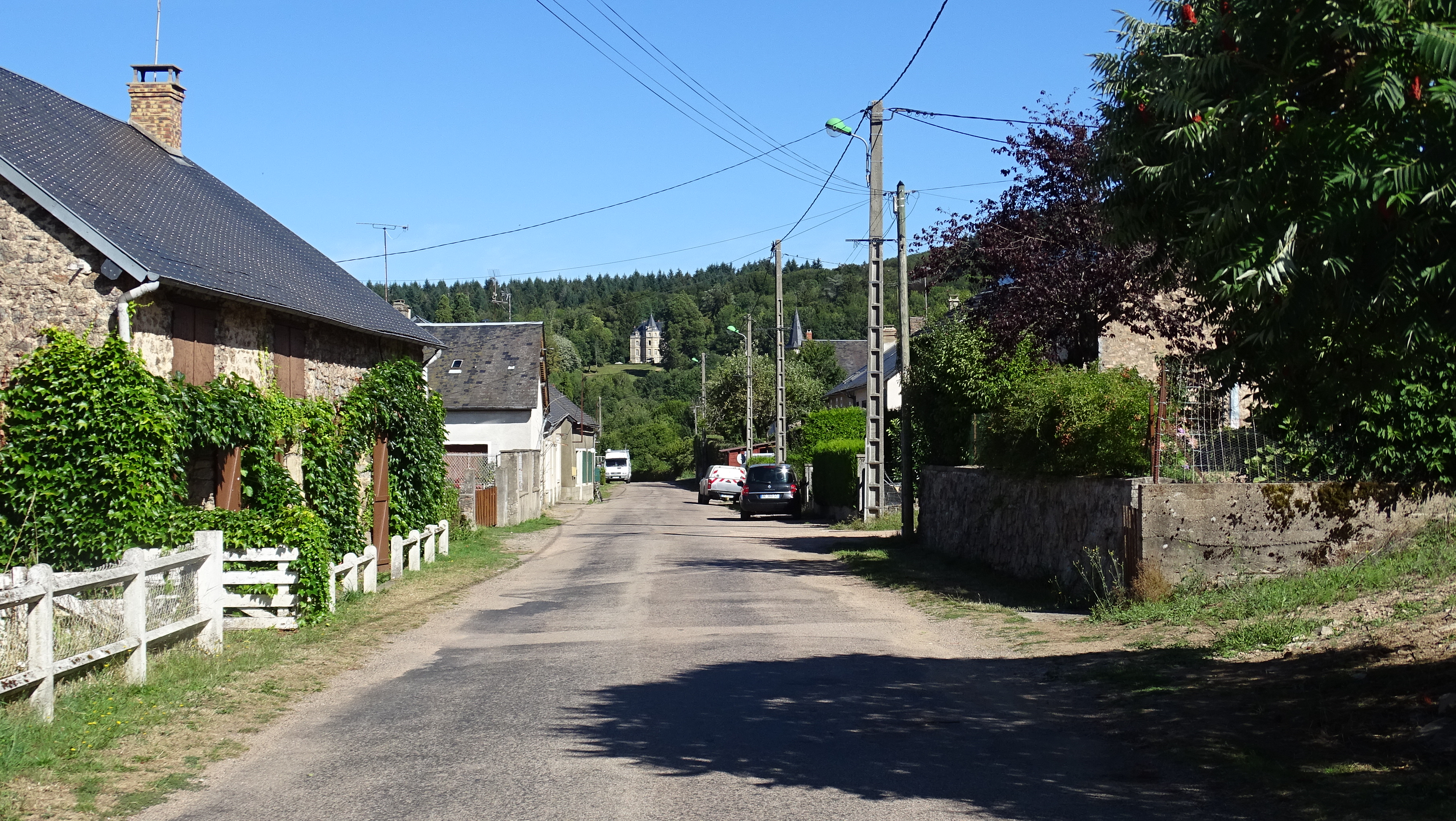
- Location of Lavault-de-Frétoy
- Location within France Location within Bourgogne-Franche-Comté
- Coordinates: 47°06′23″N 4°00′49″E
- Country: France
- Region: Bourgogne-Franche-Comté
- Department: Nièvre
- Arrondissement: Château-Chinon (Ville)
- Canton: Château-Chinon

Government
  - Mayor (2020–2026): Christine Bonte
- Area^{1}: 15.27 km^{2} (5.90 sq mi)
- Highest elevation: 767 m (2,516 ft)
- Lowest elevation: 440 m (1,440 ft)
- Population (2023): 65
  - Density: 4.3/km^{2} (11/sq mi)
- Time zone: UTC+01:00 (CET)
  - Summer (DST): UTC+02:00 (CEST)
- INSEE/Postal code: 58141 /58230
- ^{1} French Land Register data, which excludes lakes, ponds, glaciers > 1 km^{2} (0.386 sq mi or 247 acres) and river estuaries.

Lavault-de-Frétoy (French pronunciation: [lavo də fʁetwa]) is a commune in the Nièvre department in central France.

== See also ==
- Communes of the Nièvre department
- Parc naturel régional du Morvan
