= Montapas =

- Commune
- Location of Montapas
- Location within France Location within Bourgogne-Franche-Comté
- Coordinates: 47°04′56″N 3°35′59″E
- Country: France
- Region: Bourgogne-Franche-Comté
- Department: Nièvre
- Arrondissement: Château-Chinon (Ville)
- Canton: Château-Chinon

Government
  - Mayor (2020–2026): Jean-Pierre Freguin
- Area^{1}: 23.48 km^{2} (9.07 sq mi)
- Highest elevation: 291 m (955 ft)
- Lowest elevation: 232 m (761 ft)
- Population (2023): 269
  - Density: 11.5/km^{2} (29.7/sq mi)
- Time zone: UTC+01:00 (CET)
  - Summer (DST): UTC+02:00 (CEST)
- INSEE/Postal code: 58171 /58110
- ^{1} French Land Register data, which excludes lakes, ponds, glaciers > 1 km^{2} (0.386 sq mi or 247 acres) and river estuaries.

Montapas (French pronunciation: [mɔ̃tapa]) is a commune in the Nièvre department of central France.

== See also ==
- Communes of the Nièvre department
