= Châtillon-en-Bazois =

- Commune
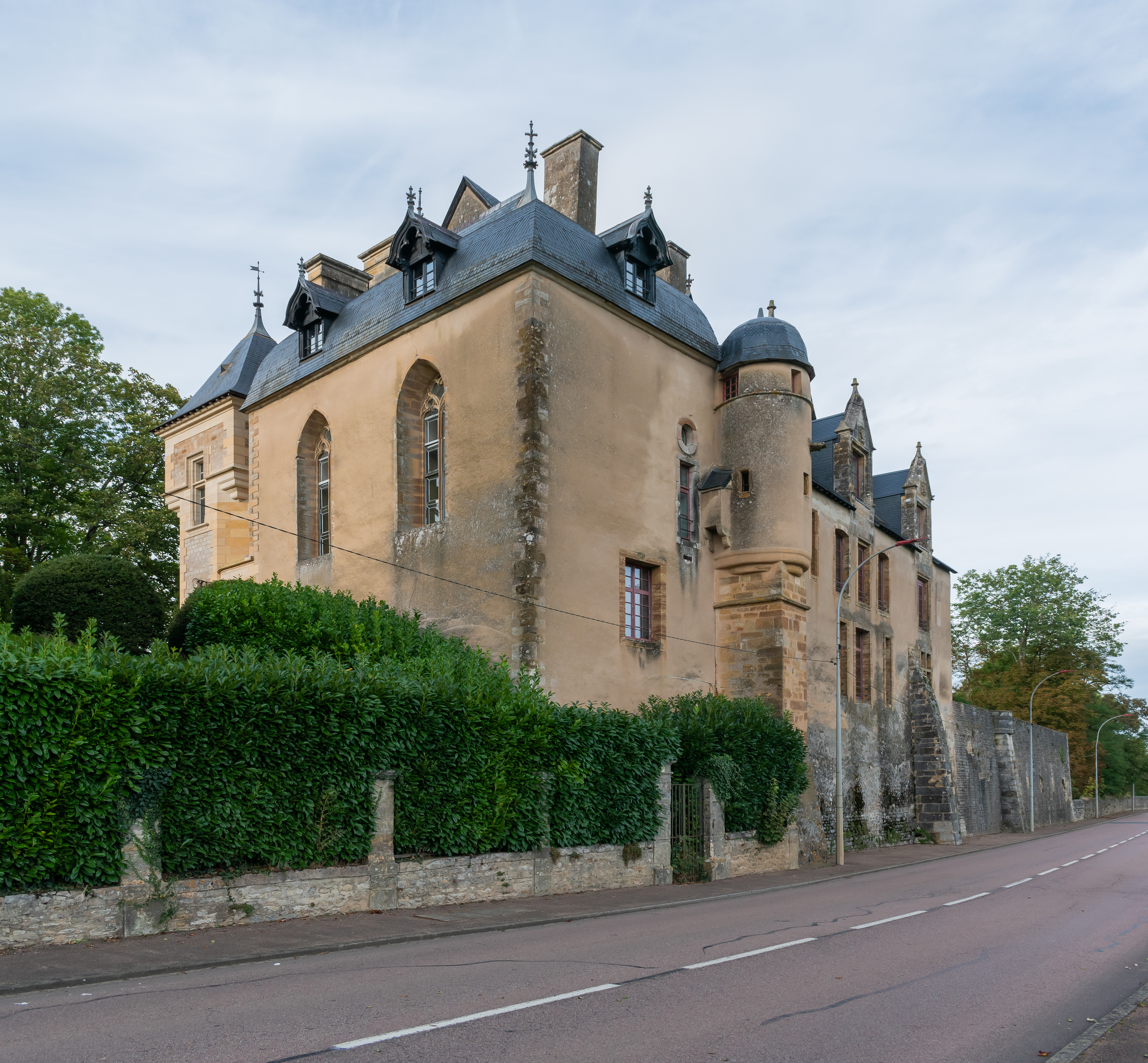
- Château de Châtillon

- Coat of arms
- Location of Châtillon-en-Bazois
- Location within France Location within Bourgogne-Franche-Comté
- Coordinates: 47°03′11″N 3°39′23″E
- Country: France
- Region: Bourgogne-Franche-Comté
- Department: Nièvre
- Arrondissement: Château-Chinon (Ville)
- Canton: Château-Chinon

Government
  - Mayor (2020–2026): Michel Marie
- Area^{1}: 19.26 km^{2} (7.44 sq mi)
- Highest elevation: 282 m (925 ft)
- Lowest elevation: 224 m (735 ft)
- Population (2023): 795
  - Density: 41.3/km^{2} (107/sq mi)
- Time zone: UTC+01:00 (CET)
  - Summer (DST): UTC+02:00 (CEST)
- INSEE/Postal code: 58065 /58110
- ^{1} French Land Register data, which excludes lakes, ponds, glaciers > 1 km^{2} (0.386 sq mi or 247 acres) and river estuaries.

Châtillon-en-Bazois (French pronunciation: [ʃatijɔ̃ ɑ̃ bazwa]) is a commune in the Nièvre department in central France.

== Demographics ==
Historical population
Year	Pop.	±% p.a.
1968	1,071	—
1975	1,151	+1.03%
1982	1,179	+0.34%
1990	1,161	−0.19%
1999	1,056	−1.05%
2007	975	−0.99%
2012	954	−0.43%
2017	897	−1.22%
2023	795	−1.99%
Source: INSEE

== See also ==
- Communes of the Nièvre department
- Parc naturel régional du Morvan
