= Alluy =

- Commune
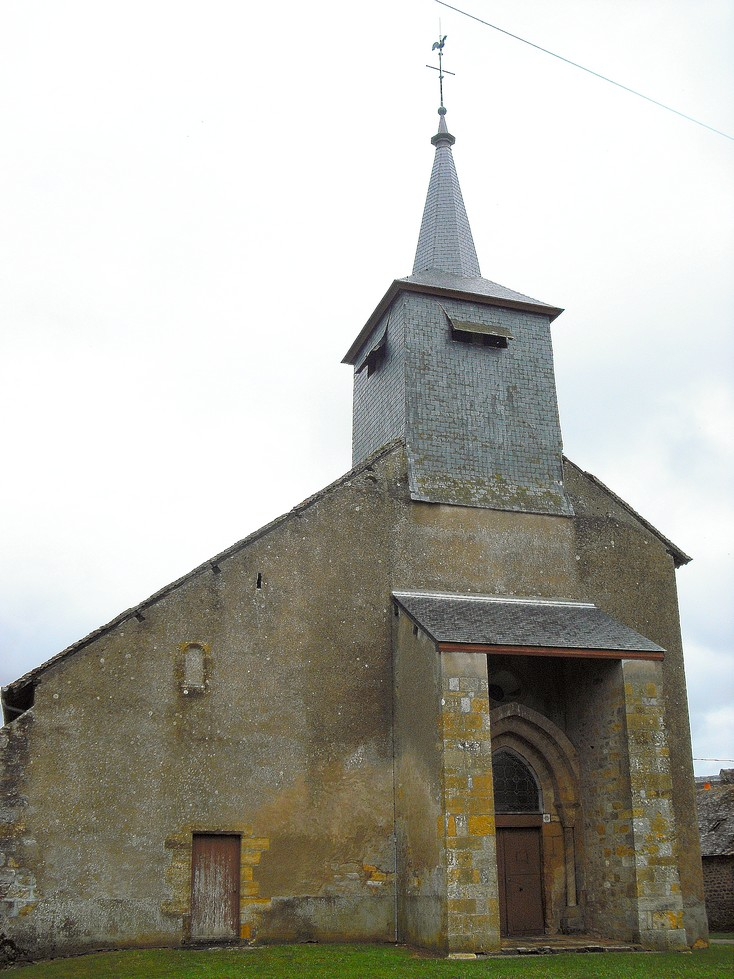
- The church of Saint-Pierre and Saint-Paul, in Alluy
- Location of Alluy
- Location within France Location within Bourgogne-Franche-Comté
- Coordinates: 47°02′05″N 3°38′30″E
- Country: France
- Region: Bourgogne-Franche-Comté
- Department: Nièvre
- Arrondissement: Château-Chinon
- Canton: Château-Chinon

Government
  - Mayor (2020–2026): Patrice Bonnet
- Area^{1}: 27.44 km^{2} (10.59 sq mi)
- Highest elevation: 287 m (942 ft)
- Lowest elevation: 221 m (725 ft)
- Population (2023): 365
  - Density: 13.3/km^{2} (34.5/sq mi)
- Time zone: UTC+01:00 (CET)
  - Summer (DST): UTC+02:00 (CEST)
- INSEE/Postal code: 58004 /58110
- ^{1} French Land Register data, which excludes lakes, ponds, glaciers > 1 km^{2} (0.386 sq mi or 247 acres) and river estuaries.

Alluy (French pronunciation: [alɥi]) is a commune in the Nièvre department in central France.

== Population ==
Historical population
| Year | Pop. | ±% p.a. |
|---|---|---|
| 1968 | 526 | — |
| 1975 | 521 | −0.14% |
| 1982 | 443 | −2.29% |
| 1990 | 449 | +0.17% |
| 1999 | 403 | −1.19% |
| 2007 | 427 | +0.73% |
| 2012 | 408 | −0.91% |
| 2017 | 386 | −1.10% |
| 2023 | 365 | −0.93% |
Source: INSEE

== See also ==
- Communes of the Nièvre department
