= Brinay, Nièvre =

Brinay
- Commune
- Location of Brinay
- Location within France Location within Bourgogne-Franche-Comté
- Coordinates: 47°00′27″N 3°41′46″E
- Country: France
- Region: Bourgogne-Franche-Comté
- Department: Nièvre
- Arrondissement: Château-Chinon (Ville)
- Canton: Château-Chinon

Government
  - Mayor (2020–2026): Pierre Tissier-Marlot
- Area^{1}: 15.90 km^{2} (6.14 sq mi)
- Highest elevation: 267 m (876 ft)
- Lowest elevation: 210 m (690 ft)
- Population (2023): 145
  - Density: 9.12/km^{2} (23.6/sq mi)
- Time zone: UTC+01:00 (CET)
  - Summer (DST): UTC+02:00 (CEST)
- INSEE/Postal code: 58040 /58110
- ^{1} French Land Register data, which excludes lakes, ponds, glaciers > 1 km^{2} (0.386 sq mi or 247 acres) and river estuaries.

Brinay (French pronunciation: [bʁinɛ]) is a commune in the Nièvre department in central France. The estimated population was 145 in 2022.

== See also ==
- Communes of the Nièvre department
