= Canton of Château-Chinon =

Coordinates: 47.06°N 3.93°E

The canton of Château-Chinon (before 2015: Canton of Château-Chinon (Ville)) is an administrative division of the Nièvre department, central France. Its borders were modified at the French canton reorganisation which came into effect in March 2015. Its seat is in Château-Chinon (Ville).

It consists of the following communes:

1. Achun
2. Alligny-en-Morvan
3. Alluy
4. Arleuf
5. Aunay-en-Bazois
6. Biches
7. Blismes
8. Brinay
9. Château-Chinon (Campagne)
10. Château-Chinon (Ville)
11. Châtillon-en-Bazois
12. Châtin
13. Chaumard
14. Chougny
15. Corancy
16. Dommartin
17. Dun-sur-Grandry
18. Fâchin
19. Gien-sur-Cure
20. Glux-en-Glenne
21. Gouloux
22. Lavault-de-Frétoy
23. Limanton
24. Mont-et-Marré
25. Montapas
26. Montigny-en-Morvan
27. Montreuillon
28. Montsauche-les-Settons
29. Moux-en-Morvan
30. Onlay
31. Ougny
32. Ouroux-en-Morvan
33. Planchez
34. Saint-Agnan
35. Saint-Brisson
36. Saint-Hilaire-en-Morvan
37. Saint-Léger-de-Fougeret
38. Saint-Péreuse
39. Tamnay-en-Bazois
40. Tintury
