= Oisy =

Oisy may refer to:

== Places ==
- Billy-sur-Oisy, a commune in the Nièvre department in central France
- Oisy, Aisne, a commune in the Aisne department in Picardy in northern France
- Oisy, Nièvre, a commune in the Nièvre department in central France
- Oisy, Nord, a commune in the Nord department in northern France
- Oisy-le-Verger, a commune in the Pas-de-Calais department in the Nord-Pas-de-Calais region of France

== See also ==
- Hugh I of Oisy (died circa 1111), the castellan of the town of Cambrai and a famous rebel against the authority of the bishops of the city
