= Maison Dieu =

Maison Dieu (French for "House of God"), plural Maisons Dieu, referred to a type of hospital or almshouse.

Examples include:

- Maison Dieu, Dover
- Maison Dieu, Faversham
- Maison Dieu, (Singleton, New South Wales)

== See also ==
- La Maison Dieu (disambiguation)
