= Asnois =

Asnois is the name of two communes in France:

- Asnois, Nièvre, in the Nièvre department
- Asnois, Vienne, in the Vienne department
