= Moissy =

Moissy may refer to:

- The name or part of the name of two communes of France:
  - Moissy-Cramayel in the Seine-et-Marne département
  - Moissy-Moulinot in the Nièvre département
- Moissy, a young revolutionary militia created by Comorian president Ali Soilih (1975-1978)
