= Saint-Germain-des-Bois =

Saint-Germain-des-Bois may refer to the following places in France:

- Saint-Germain-des-Bois, Cher, a commune in the department of Cher
- Saint-Germain-des-Bois, Nièvre, a commune in the department of Nièvre
