= Cuncy-lès-Varzy =

- Commune
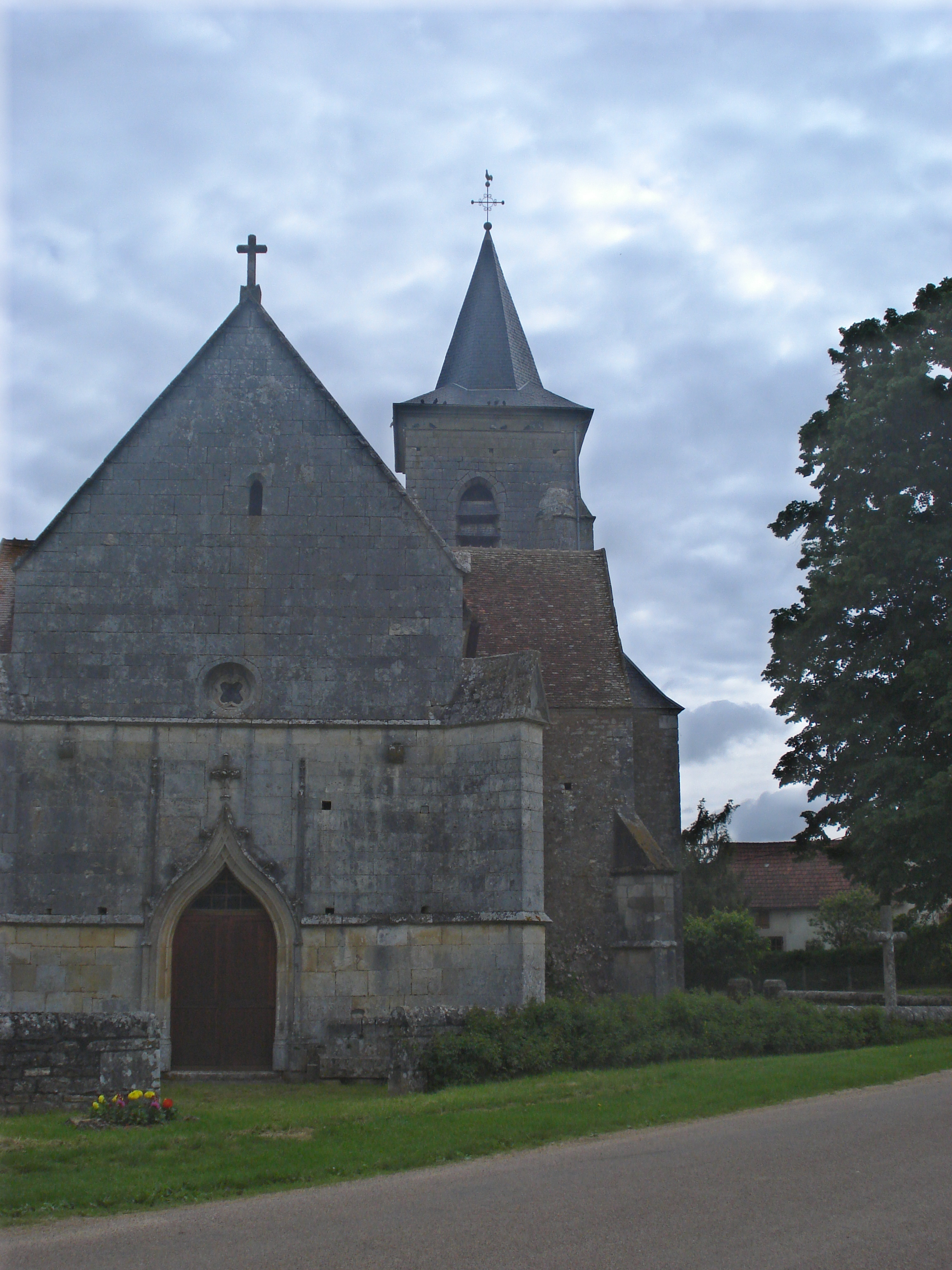
- The church in Cuncy-lès-Varzy
- Location of Cuncy-lès-Varzy
- Location within France Location within Bourgogne-Franche-Comté
- Coordinates: 47°22′24″N 3°27′31″E
- Country: France
- Region: Bourgogne-Franche-Comté
- Department: Nièvre
- Arrondissement: Clamecy
- Canton: Clamecy
- Intercommunality: Haut Nivernais-Val d'Yonne

Government
  - Mayor (2020–2026): Pascal Beaurenaut
- Area^{1}: 15.24 km^{2} (5.88 sq mi)
- Highest elevation: 322 m (1,056 ft)
- Lowest elevation: 188 m (617 ft)
- Population (2023): 120
  - Density: 7.9/km^{2} (20/sq mi)
- Time zone: UTC+01:00 (CET)
  - Summer (DST): UTC+02:00 (CEST)
- INSEE/Postal code: 58093 /58210
- ^{1} French Land Register data, which excludes lakes, ponds, glaciers > 1 km^{2} (0.386 sq mi or 247 acres) and river estuaries.

Cuncy-lès-Varzy (French pronunciation: [kœ̃si lɛ vaʁzi], literally Cuncy near Varzy) is a commune in the Nièvre department in central France. It is located 6 km northeast of the town of Varzy and 15 km southeast of Clamecy.

== History ==
The occasional discovery of Gallo-Roman vestiges suggests that the town has long been occupied. The name "Cuncy" dates from the period of Roman conquest and comes from the Roman Quintiacum (Cunciacum, Cunciae). In 1075, Cuncy was established as a parish by the bishop of Auxerre, Geoffroy de Champallement, and the original church likely dates to this period. In the Middle Ages, particularly from the 12th century onwards, monasteries and abbeys were established and spread throughout the region. Today, although Cuncy-lès-Varzy still boasts a beautiful Gothic church, the monastic communities have long since disappeared and the last resident priest left Cuncy several decades ago. The presbytery, built relatively recently (1827), is now the town social hall, but retains the inscription «Domus mea domus orationis».

== Eglise Saint Martin ==
The church in Cuncy-les-Varzy, known as Eglise Saint Martin, was built primarily during the 16th century, following a fire that destroyed an earlier Romanesque building on the same site, of which all that remains today is located at the base of the bell tower. The church has a stained glass window that dates to the 16th century that includes scenes from the life of Saint Martin. Major works to restore the roof were undertaken beginning in 2020.

== Location on the Chemin de Saint Jacques ==
Cuncy-lès-Varcy is a way point on the Voie de Vézelay, one of the main routes of the scenic Chemin de Saint Jacques de Compostelle trail, which winds its way from Vézelay to Santiago de Compostela in Spain. Cuncy is located on the portion of the trail that runs from Tannay to Varzy.

== Tale of the woman nearly buried alive in the 19th century ==
A newspaper article from 1886 tells the tale of a woman from Cuncy les Varzy who had been thought dead and placed in her coffin. As the funeral director prepared to place the final nail in the coffin, the woman sat up and said "I'd like to have some soup." After the initial terror had passed, those present helped her out of the coffin and gave her some soup.

== See also ==
- Communes of the Nièvre department
