= La Maison Dieu =

La Maison Dieu may refer to:

- La Maison-Dieu, a village in France; or
- The French name for The Tower, a tarot card.
