= Courcelles, Nièvre =

Courcelles
- Commune
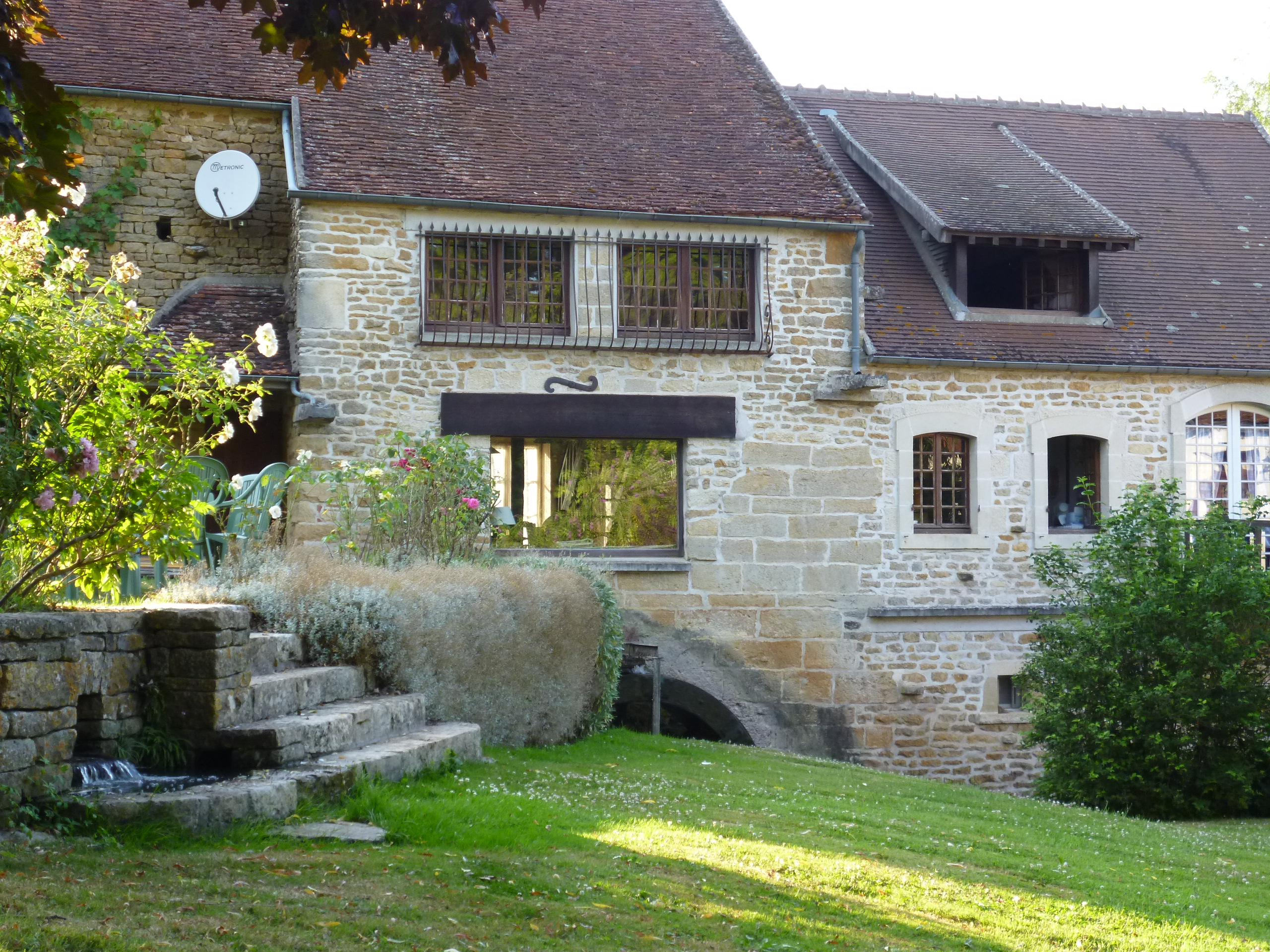
- The Chivres mill, in Courcelles
- Location of Courcelles
- Location within France Location within Bourgogne-Franche-Comté
- Coordinates: 47°23′46″N 3°24′08″E
- Country: France
- Region: Bourgogne-Franche-Comté
- Department: Nièvre
- Arrondissement: Clamecy
- Canton: Clamecy
- Intercommunality: Haut Nivernais-Val d'Yonne

Government
  - Mayor (2020–2026): Michaël François
- Area^{1}: 9.56 km^{2} (3.69 sq mi)
- Highest elevation: 289 m (948 ft)
- Lowest elevation: 181 m (594 ft)
- Population (2023): 233
  - Density: 24.4/km^{2} (63.1/sq mi)
- Time zone: UTC+01:00 (CET)
  - Summer (DST): UTC+02:00 (CEST)
- INSEE/Postal code: 58090 /58210
- ^{1} French Land Register data, which excludes lakes, ponds, glaciers > 1 km^{2} (0.386 sq mi or 247 acres) and river estuaries.

Courcelles (French pronunciation: [kuʁsɛl]) is a commune in the Nièvre Department in central France.

== See also ==
- Communes of the Nièvre department
