= Metz-le-Comte =

- Commune
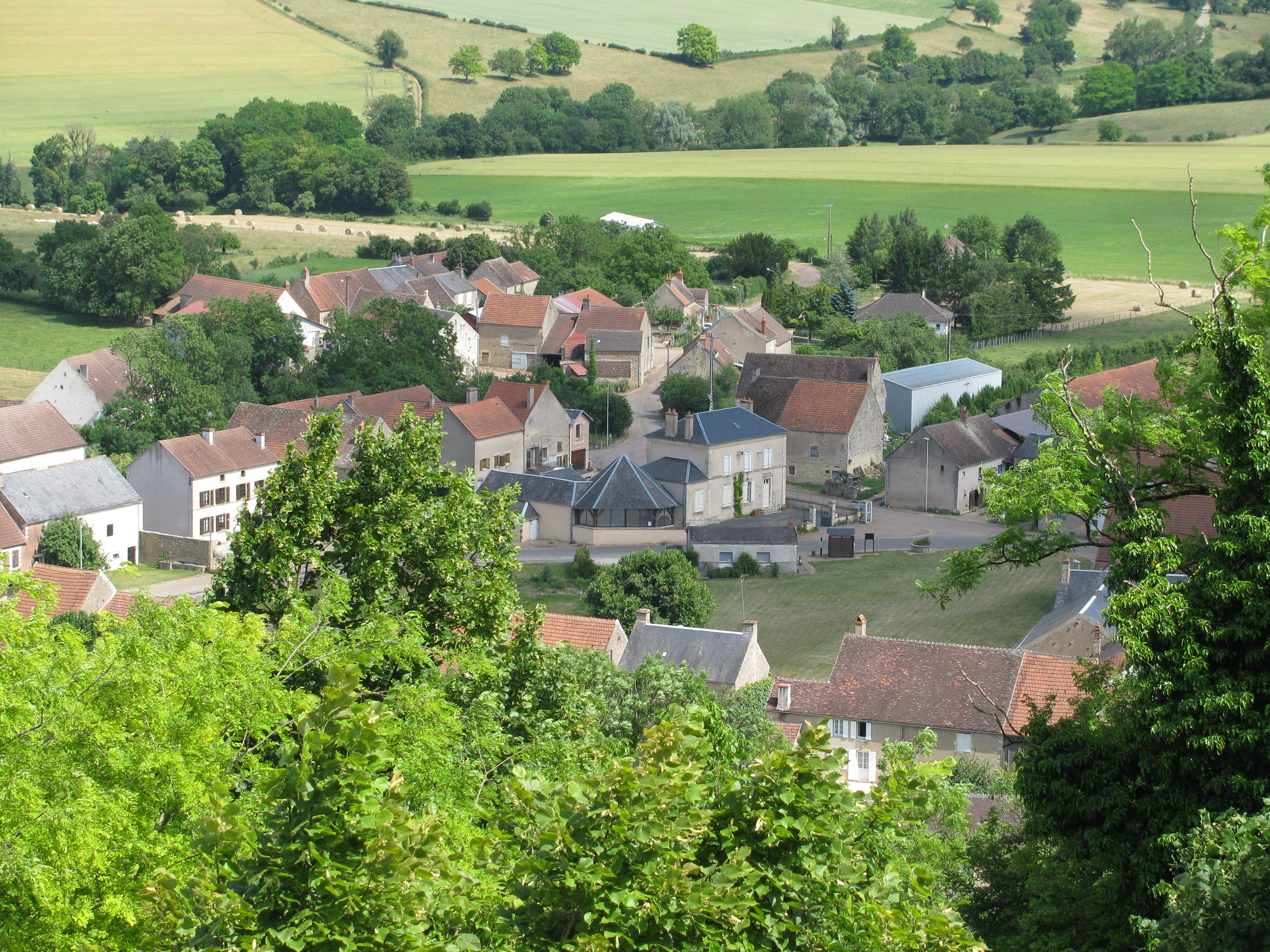
- A general view of Metz-le-Comte
- Location of Metz-le-Comte
- Location within France Location within Bourgogne-Franche-Comté
- Coordinates: 47°23′31″N 3°38′24″E
- Country: France
- Region: Bourgogne-Franche-Comté
- Department: Nièvre
- Arrondissement: Clamecy
- Canton: Clamecy
- Intercommunality: Tannay-Brinon-Corbigny

Government
  - Mayor (2020–2026): Jean-Claude Gauthier
- Area^{1}: 14.37 km^{2} (5.55 sq mi)
- Highest elevation: 314 m (1,030 ft)
- Lowest elevation: 157 m (515 ft)
- Population (2023): 177
  - Density: 12.3/km^{2} (31.9/sq mi)
- Time zone: UTC+01:00 (CET)
  - Summer (DST): UTC+02:00 (CEST)
- INSEE/Postal code: 58165 /58190
- ^{1} French Land Register data, which excludes lakes, ponds, glaciers > 1 km^{2} (0.386 sq mi or 247 acres) and river estuaries.

Metz-le-Comte is a commune in the Nièvre department in central France.

== See also ==
- Communes of the Nièvre department
