= Brèves =

- Commune
- Coat of arms
- Location of Brèves
- Location within France Location within Bourgogne-Franche-Comté
- Coordinates: 47°25′08″N 3°36′24″E
- Country: France
- Region: Bourgogne-Franche-Comté
- Department: Nièvre
- Arrondissement: Clamecy
- Canton: Clamecy
- Intercommunality: Haut Nivernais-Val d'Yonne

Government
  - Mayor (2020–2026): Yves Lamble
- Area^{1}: 16.64 km^{2} (6.42 sq mi)
- Highest elevation: 309 m (1,014 ft)
- Lowest elevation: 152 m (499 ft)
- Population (2023): 258
  - Density: 15.5/km^{2} (40.2/sq mi)
- Time zone: UTC+01:00 (CET)
  - Summer (DST): UTC+02:00 (CEST)
- INSEE/Postal code: 58039 /58530
- ^{1} French Land Register data, which excludes lakes, ponds, glaciers > 1 km^{2} (0.386 sq mi or 247 acres) and river estuaries.

Brèves (French pronunciation: [bʁɛv]) is a commune in the Nièvre department in central France.

== Population ==
Historical population
Year	Pop.	±% p.a.
1968	298	—
1975	273	−1.24%
1982	234	−2.18%
1990	286	+2.54%
1999	308	+0.83%
2007	298	−0.41%
2012	287	−0.75%
2017	243	−3.27%
2023	258	+1.00%
Source: INSEE

== See also ==
- Communes of the Nièvre department
