= Saizy =

- Commune
- Location of Saizy
- Location within France Location within Bourgogne-Franche-Comté
- Coordinates: 47°21′32″N 3°42′18″E
- Country: France
- Region: Bourgogne-Franche-Comté
- Department: Nièvre
- Arrondissement: Clamecy
- Canton: Clamecy

Government
  - Mayor (2020–2026): Philippe Guyard
- Area^{1}: 13.23 km^{2} (5.11 sq mi)
- Highest elevation: 362 m (1,188 ft)
- Lowest elevation: 179 m (587 ft)
- Population (2023): 189
  - Density: 14.3/km^{2} (37.0/sq mi)
- Time zone: UTC+01:00 (CET)
  - Summer (DST): UTC+02:00 (CEST)
- INSEE/Postal code: 58271 /58190
- ^{1} French Land Register data, which excludes lakes, ponds, glaciers > 1 km^{2} (0.386 sq mi or 247 acres) and river estuaries.

Saizy (French pronunciation: [sɛzi]) is a commune in the Nièvre department in central France.

== See also ==
- Communes of the Nièvre department
