= Canton of Clamecy =

Coordinates: 47.46°N 3.52°E

The canton of Clamecy is an administrative division of the Nièvre department, central France. Its borders were modified at the French canton reorganisation which came into effect in March 2015. Its seat is in Clamecy.

It consists of the following communes:

1. Amazy
2. Armes
3. Asnois
4. Billy-sur-Oisy
5. Breugnon
6. Brèves
7. La Chapelle-Saint-André
8. Chevroches
9. Clamecy
10. Corvol-l'Orgueilleux
11. Courcelles
12. Cuncy-lès-Varzy
13. Dirol
14. Dornecy
15. Entrains-sur-Nohain
16. Flez-Cuzy
17. Lys
18. La Maison-Dieu
19. Marcy
20. Menou
21. Metz-le-Comte
22. Moissy-Moulinot
23. Monceaux-le-Comte
24. Neuffontaines
25. Nuars
26. Oisy
27. Ouagne
28. Oudan
29. Parigny-la-Rose
30. Pousseaux
31. Rix
32. Ruages
33. Saint-Aubin-des-Chaumes
34. Saint-Didier
35. Saint-Germain-des-Bois
36. Saint-Pierre-du-Mont
37. Saizy
38. Surgy
39. Talon
40. Tannay
41. Teigny
42. Trucy-l'Orgueilleux
43. Varzy
44. Vignol
45. Villiers-le-Sec
46. Villiers-sur-Yonne
