= Marcy, Nièvre =

Marcy
- Commune
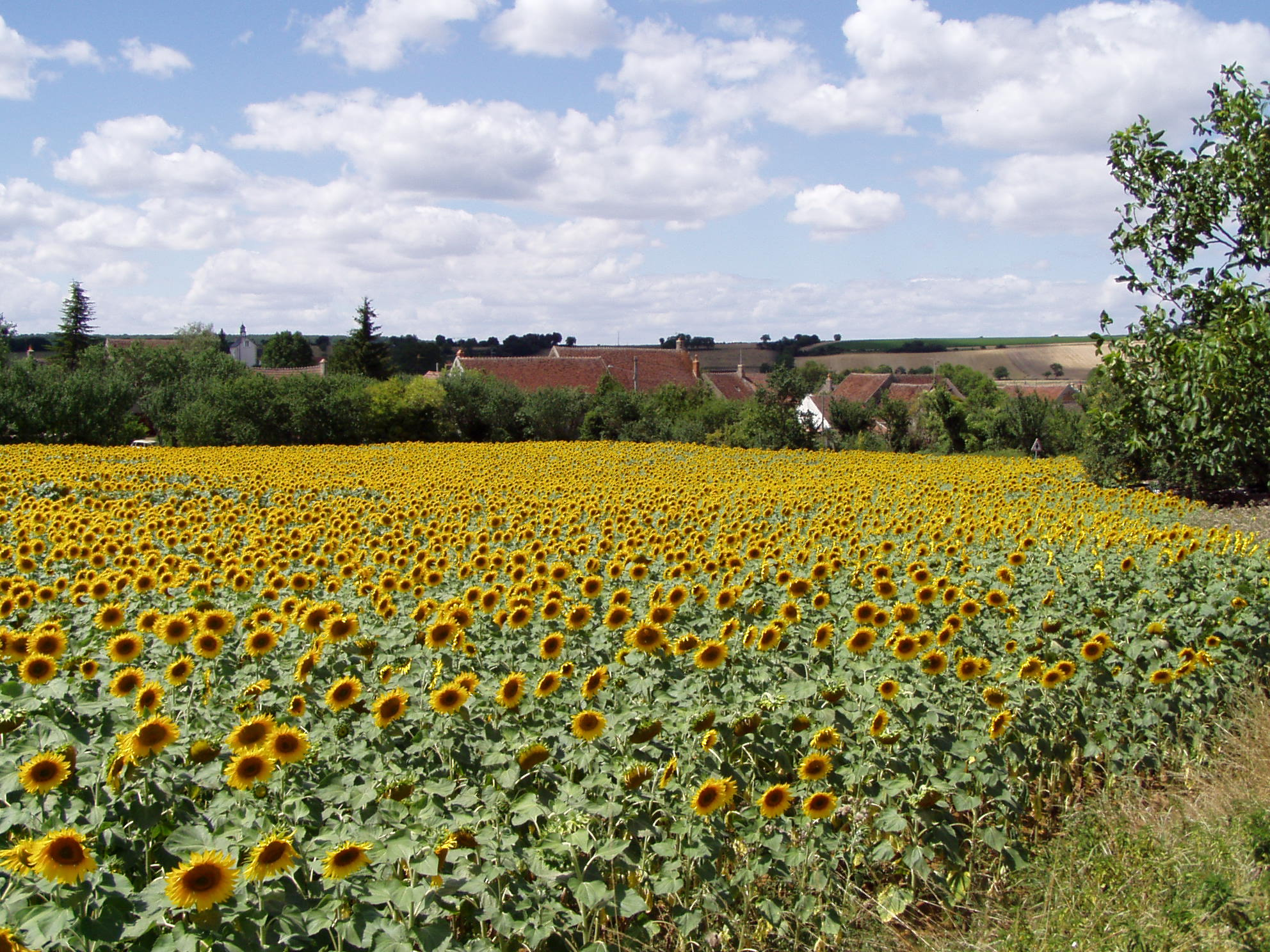
- A field of sunflowers in Marcy
- Location of Marcy
- Location within France Location within Bourgogne-Franche-Comté
- Coordinates: 47°19′15″N 3°24′33″E
- Country: France
- Region: Bourgogne-Franche-Comté
- Department: Nièvre
- Arrondissement: Clamecy
- Canton: Clamecy

Government
  - Mayor (2020–2026): Guy-André-Jean Gaujour
- Area^{1}: 14.31 km^{2} (5.53 sq mi)
- Highest elevation: 383 m (1,257 ft)
- Lowest elevation: 209 m (686 ft)
- Population (2023): 139
  - Density: 9.71/km^{2} (25.2/sq mi)
- Time zone: UTC+01:00 (CET)
  - Summer (DST): UTC+02:00 (CEST)
- INSEE/Postal code: 58156 /58210
- ^{1} French Land Register data, which excludes lakes, ponds, glaciers > 1 km^{2} (0.386 sq mi or 247 acres) and river estuaries.

Marcy (French pronunciation: [maʁsi]) is a commune in the Nièvre department in central France.

== See also ==
- Communes of the Nièvre department
