= Talon, Nièvre =

Talon
- Commune
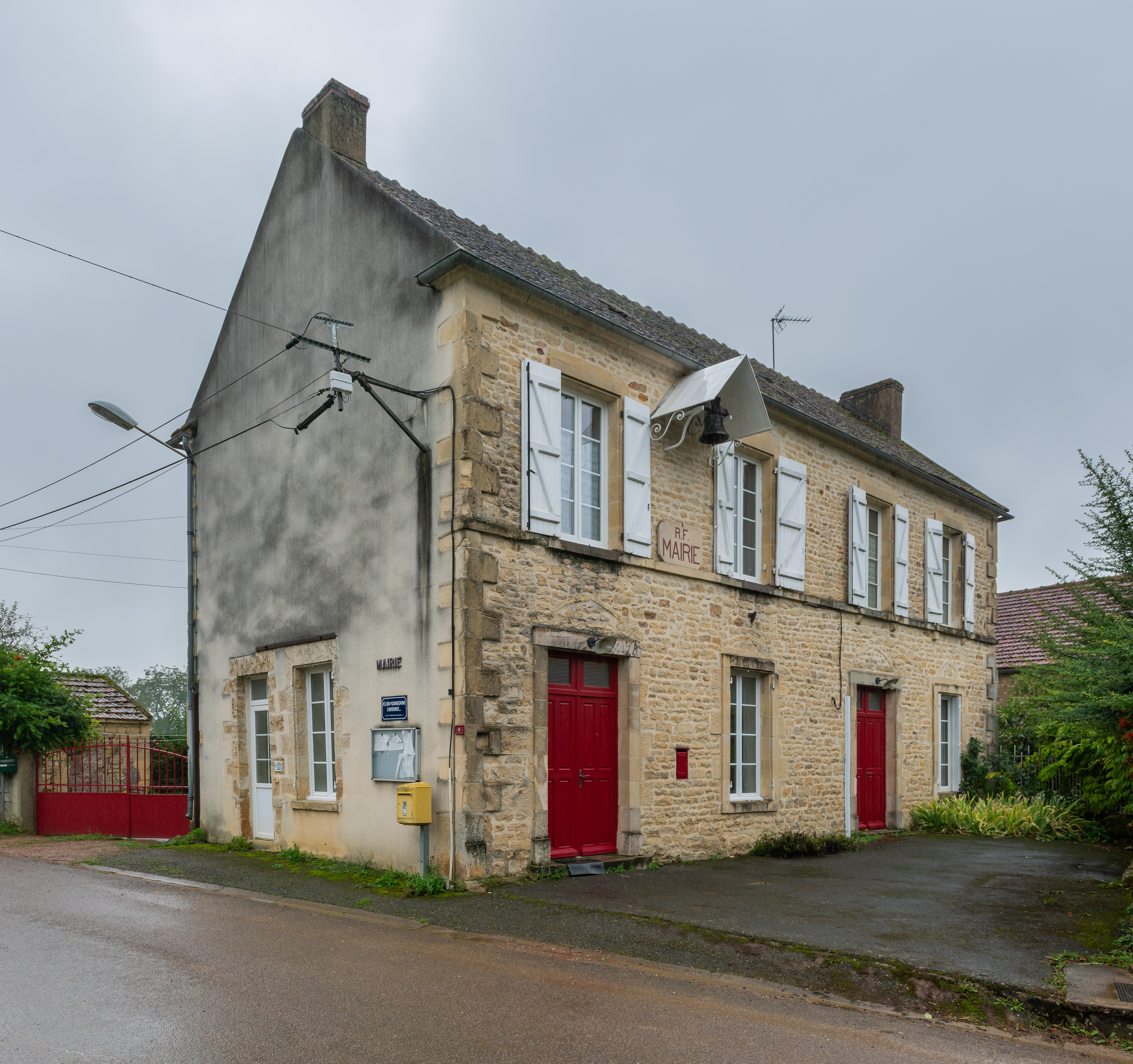
- Town hall of Talon
- Location of Talon
- Location within France Location within Bourgogne-Franche-Comté
- Coordinates: 47°20′03″N 3°33′38″E
- Country: France
- Region: Bourgogne-Franche-Comté
- Department: Nièvre
- Arrondissement: Clamecy
- Canton: Clamecy
- Intercommunality: Tannay-Brinon-Corbigny

Government
  - Mayor (2020–2026): Patrice Perrier
- Area^{1}: 6.27 km^{2} (2.42 sq mi)
- Highest elevation: 391 m (1,283 ft)
- Lowest elevation: 225 m (738 ft)
- Population (2023): 42
  - Density: 6.7/km^{2} (17/sq mi)
- Time zone: UTC+01:00 (CET)
  - Summer (DST): UTC+02:00 (CEST)
- INSEE/Postal code: 58284 /58190
- ^{1} French Land Register data, which excludes lakes, ponds, glaciers > 1 km^{2} (0.386 sq mi or 247 acres) and river estuaries.

Talon (French pronunciation: [talɔ̃]) is a commune in the Nièvre department in central France.

== Demographics ==
Historical population
| Year | Pop. | ±% p.a. |
|---|---|---|
| 1968 | 65 | — |
| 1975 | 73 | +1.67% |
| 1982 | 45 | −6.68% |
| 1990 | 57 | +3.00% |
| 1999 | 57 | +0.00% |
| 2007 | 50 | −1.62% |
| 2012 | 45 | −2.09% |
| 2017 | 40 | −2.33% |
| 2023 | 42 | +0.82% |
Source: INSEE

== See also ==
- Communes of the Nièvre department
