= Saint-Didier, Nièvre =

Saint-Didier
- Commune
- Location of Saint-Didier
- Location within France Location within Bourgogne-Franche-Comté
- Coordinates: 47°21′00″N 3°37′19″E
- Country: France
- Region: Bourgogne-Franche-Comté
- Department: Nièvre
- Arrondissement: Clamecy
- Canton: Clamecy
- Intercommunality: Tannay-Brinon-Corbigny

Government
  - Mayor (2020–2026): Jean-Pierre Bierry
- Area^{1}: 3.51 km^{2} (1.36 sq mi)
- Highest elevation: 213 m (699 ft)
- Lowest elevation: 162 m (531 ft)
- Population (2023): 30
  - Density: 8.5/km^{2} (22/sq mi)
- Time zone: UTC+01:00 (CET)
  - Summer (DST): UTC+02:00 (CEST)
- INSEE/Postal code: 58237 /58190
- ^{1} French Land Register data, which excludes lakes, ponds, glaciers > 1 km^{2} (0.386 sq mi or 247 acres) and river estuaries.

Saint-Didier (French pronunciation: [sɛ̃ didje]) is a commune in the Nièvre department in central France.

== See also ==
- Communes of the Nièvre department
