= Menou =

- Commune
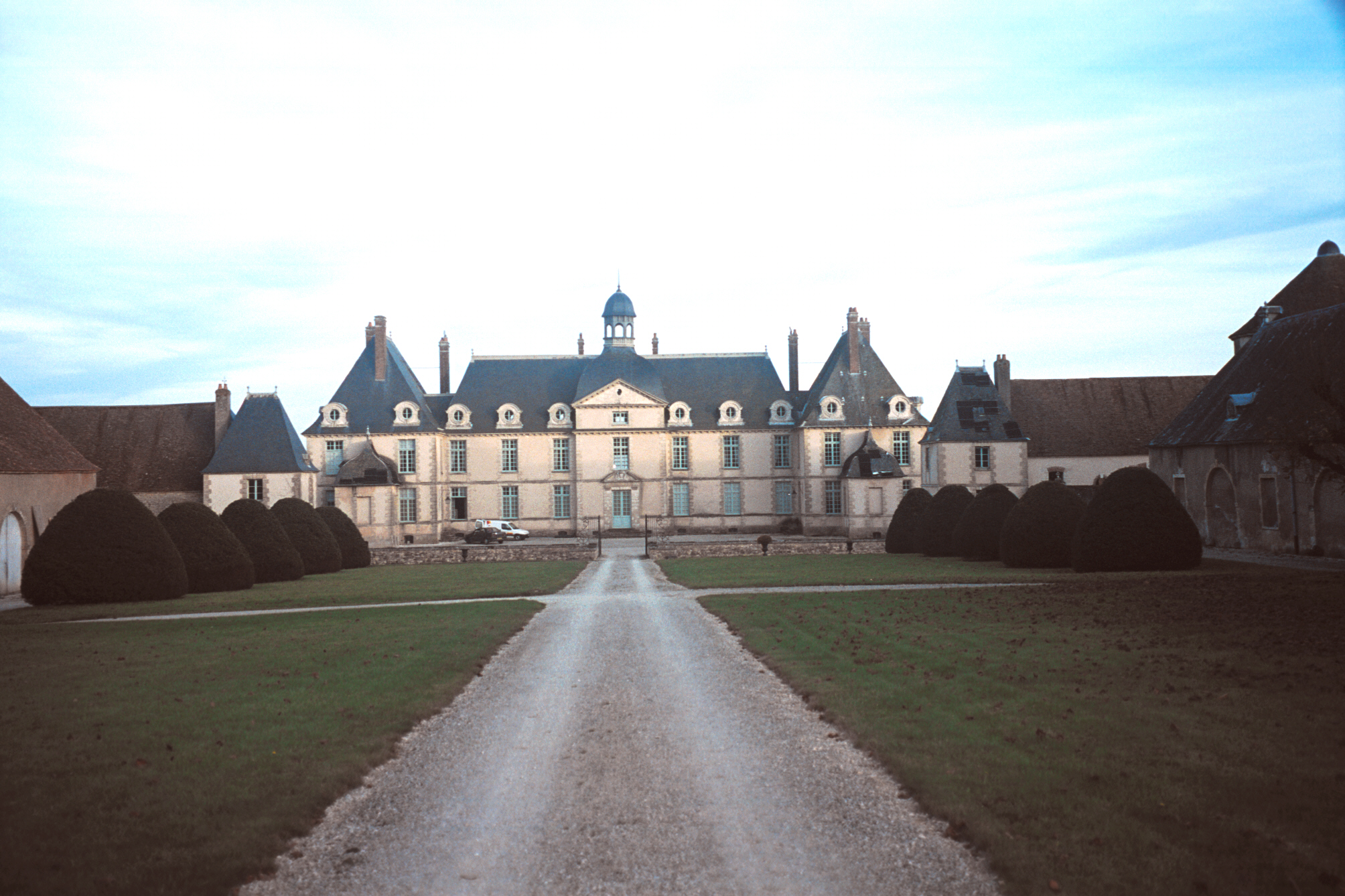
- The chateau in Menou
- Location of Menou
- Location within France Location within Bourgogne-Franche-Comté
- Coordinates: 47°22′12″N 3°16′52″E
- Country: France
- Region: Bourgogne-Franche-Comté
- Department: Nièvre
- Arrondissement: Clamecy
- Canton: Clamecy
- Intercommunality: Haut Nivernais-Val d'Yonne

Government
  - Mayor (2020–2026): Véronique Ravaud
- Area^{1}: 17.41 km^{2} (6.72 sq mi)
- Highest elevation: 382 m (1,253 ft)
- Lowest elevation: 232 m (761 ft)
- Population (2023): 179
  - Density: 10.3/km^{2} (26.6/sq mi)
- Time zone: UTC+01:00 (CET)
  - Summer (DST): UTC+02:00 (CEST)
- INSEE/Postal code: 58163 /58210
- ^{1} French Land Register data, which excludes lakes, ponds, glaciers > 1 km^{2} (0.386 sq mi or 247 acres) and river estuaries.

Menou (French pronunciation: [mənu]) is a commune in the Nièvre department in central France.

== See also ==
- Communes of the Nièvre department
