= Vignol =

- Commune
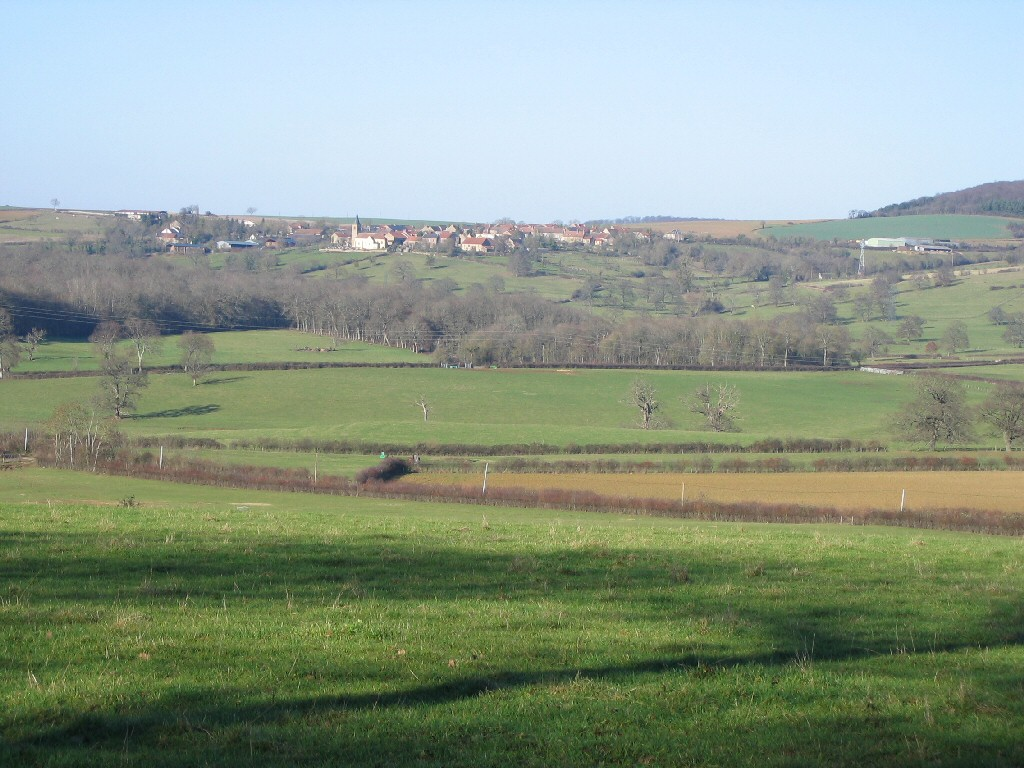
- A general view of Vignol
- Location of Vignol
- Location within France Location within Bourgogne-Franche-Comté
- Coordinates: 47°21′47″N 3°40′24″E
- Country: France
- Region: Bourgogne-Franche-Comté
- Department: Nièvre
- Arrondissement: Clamecy
- Canton: Clamecy
- Intercommunality: Tannay-Brinon-Corbigny

Government
  - Mayor (2020–2026): Hervé Guenot
- Area^{1}: 8.97 km^{2} (3.46 sq mi)
- Highest elevation: 323 m (1,060 ft)
- Lowest elevation: 168 m (551 ft)
- Population (2023): 59
  - Density: 6.6/km^{2} (17/sq mi)
- Time zone: UTC+01:00 (CET)
  - Summer (DST): UTC+02:00 (CEST)
- INSEE/Postal code: 58308 /58190
- ^{1} French Land Register data, which excludes lakes, ponds, glaciers > 1 km^{2} (0.386 sq mi or 247 acres) and river estuaries.

Vignol (French pronunciation: [viɲɔl]) is a commune in the Nièvre department in central France.

== See also ==
- Communes of the Nièvre department
