= Pousseaux =

- Commune
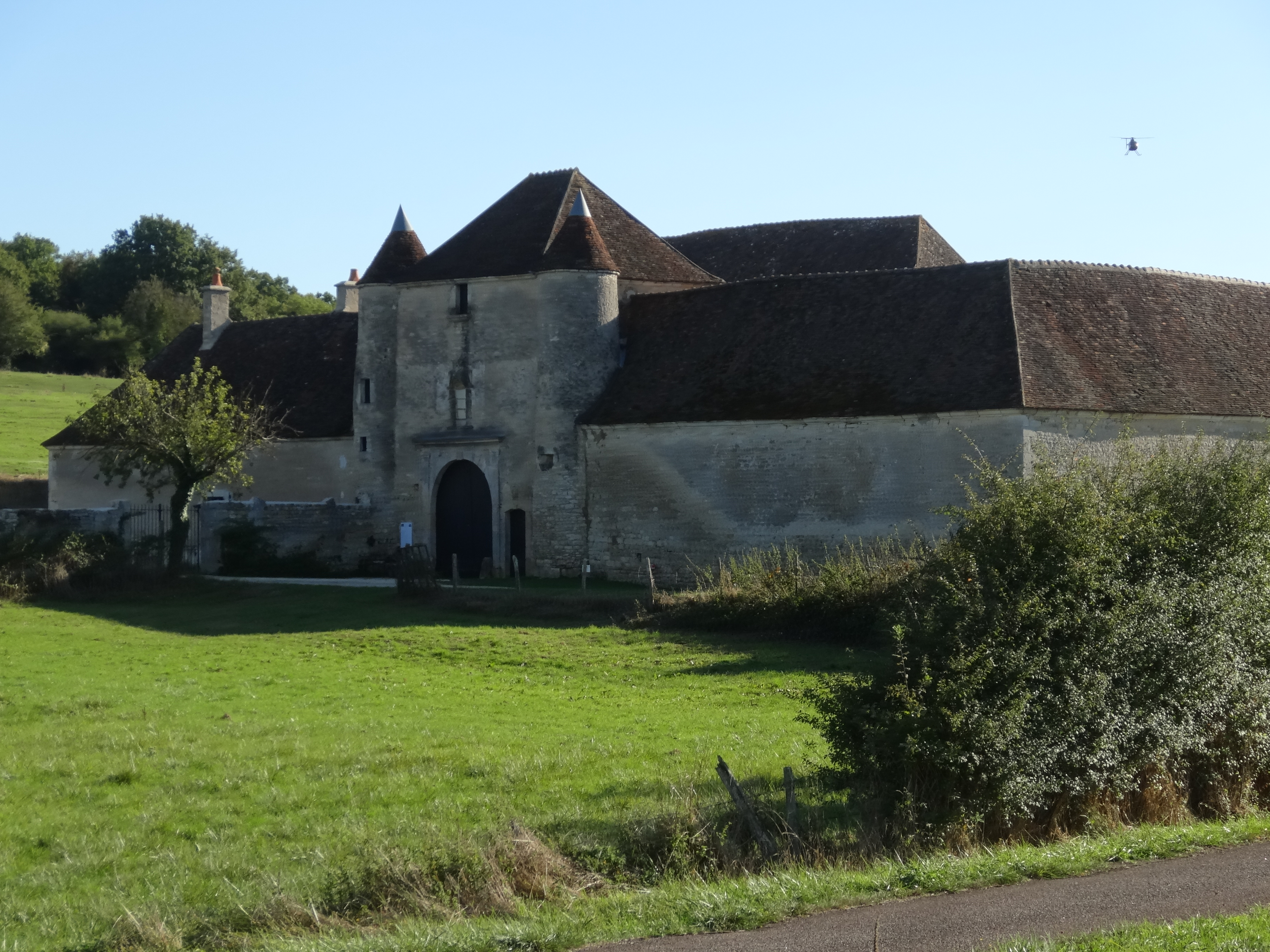
- Basseville Charterhouse in Pousseaux
- Location of Pousseaux
- Location within France Location within Bourgogne-Franche-Comté
- Coordinates: 47°30′53″N 3°31′41″E
- Country: France
- Region: Bourgogne-Franche-Comté
- Department: Nièvre
- Arrondissement: Clamecy
- Canton: Clamecy

Government
  - Mayor (2020–2026): Jacques Vigier
- Area^{1}: 11.11 km^{2} (4.29 sq mi)
- Highest elevation: 242 m (794 ft)
- Lowest elevation: 137 m (449 ft)
- Population (2023): 186
  - Density: 16.7/km^{2} (43.4/sq mi)
- Time zone: UTC+01:00 (CET)
  - Summer (DST): UTC+02:00 (CEST)
- INSEE/Postal code: 58217 /58500
- ^{1} French Land Register data, which excludes lakes, ponds, glaciers > 1 km^{2} (0.386 sq mi or 247 acres) and river estuaries.

Pousseaux (French pronunciation: [puso]) is a commune in the Nièvre department in central France.

== See also ==
- Communes of the Nièvre department
