= Amazy =

- Commune
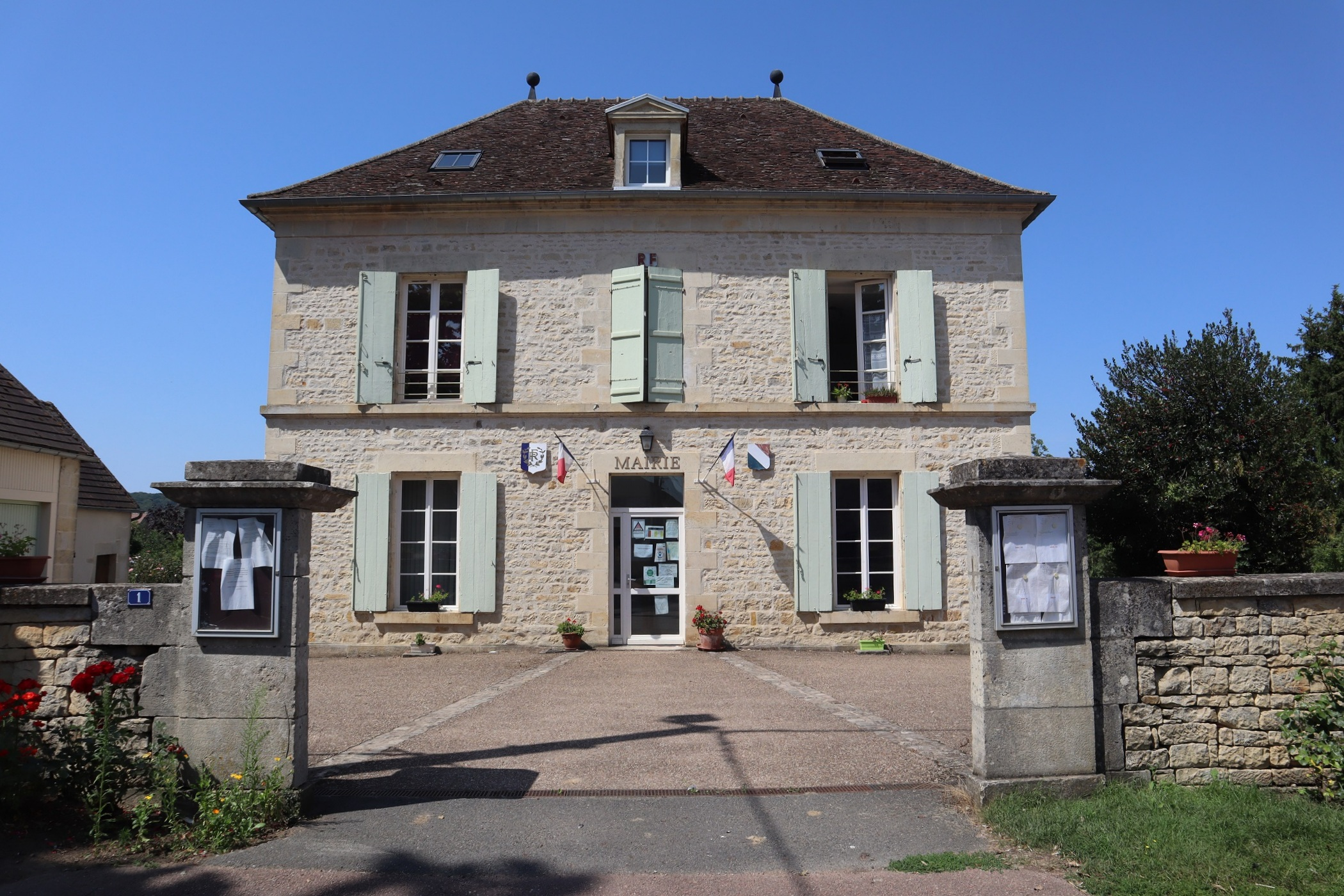
- Amazy Town hall
- Location of Amazy
- Location within France Location within Bourgogne-Franche-Comté
- Coordinates: 47°22′37″N 3°34′46″E
- Country: France
- Region: Bourgogne-Franche-Comté
- Department: Nièvre
- Arrondissement: Clamecy
- Canton: Clamecy
- Intercommunality: CC Tannay-Brinon-Corbigny

Government
  - Mayor (2020–2026): Philippe Laguigner
- Area^{1}: 13.74 km^{2} (5.31 sq mi)
- Highest elevation: 338 m (1,109 ft)
- Lowest elevation: 159 m (522 ft)
- Population (2023): 208
  - Density: 15.1/km^{2} (39.2/sq mi)
- Time zone: UTC+01:00 (CET)
  - Summer (DST): UTC+02:00 (CEST)
- INSEE/Postal code: 58005 /58190
- ^{1} French Land Register data, which excludes lakes, ponds, glaciers > 1 km^{2} (0.386 sq mi or 247 acres) and river estuaries.

Amazy (French pronunciation: [amazi]) is a commune in the Nièvre department in central France.

== Population ==
Historical population
Year	Pop.	±% p.a.
1968	226	—
1975	228	+0.13%
1982	233	+0.31%
1990	244	+0.58%
1999	246	+0.09%
2007	240	−0.31%
2012	236	−0.34%
2017	228	−0.69%
2023	208	−1.52%
Source: INSEE

== See also ==
- Communes of the Nièvre department
