= Villiers-le-Sec, Nièvre =

Villiers-le-Sec
- Commune
- Location of Villiers-le-Sec
- Location within France Location within Bourgogne-Franche-Comté
- Coordinates: 47°22′41″N 3°25′50″E
- Country: France
- Region: Bourgogne-Franche-Comté
- Department: Nièvre
- Arrondissement: Clamecy
- Canton: Clamecy
- Intercommunality: Haut Nivernais-Val d'Yonne

Government
  - Mayor (2020–2026): Marie-France Duhamel
- Area^{1}: 1.38 km^{2} (0.53 sq mi)
- Highest elevation: 320 m (1,050 ft)
- Lowest elevation: 224 m (735 ft)
- Population (2023): 47
  - Density: 34/km^{2} (88/sq mi)
- Time zone: UTC+01:00 (CET)
  - Summer (DST): UTC+02:00 (CEST)
- INSEE/Postal code: 58310 /58210
- ^{1} French Land Register data, which excludes lakes, ponds, glaciers > 1 km^{2} (0.386 sq mi or 247 acres) and river estuaries.

Villiers-le-Sec (French pronunciation: [vilje lə sɛk]) is a commune in the Nièvre department in central France.

== See also ==
- Communes of the Nièvre department
