= Rix, Nièvre =

Rix
- Commune
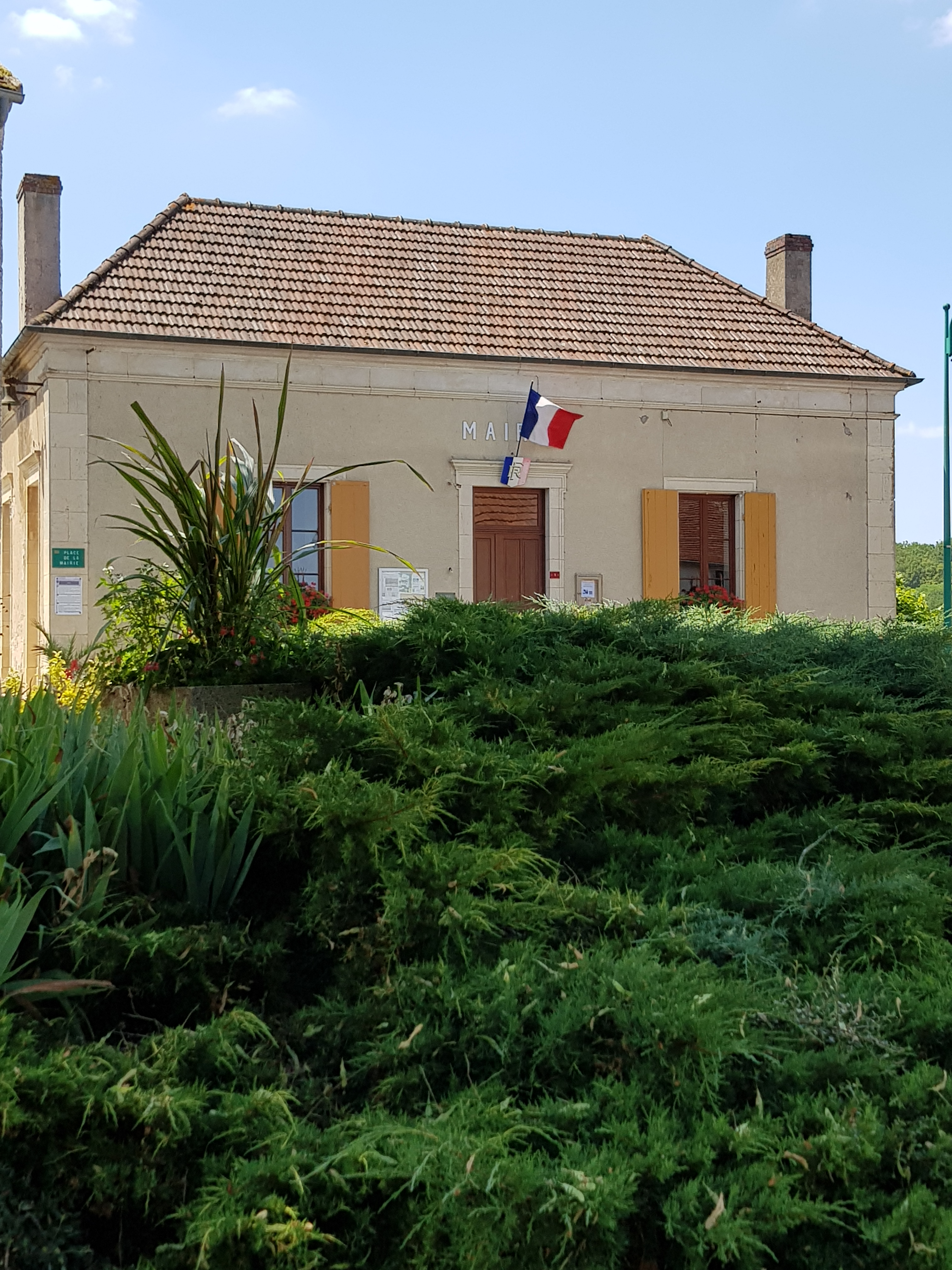
- Town hall
- Location of Rix
- Location within France Location within Bourgogne-Franche-Comté
- Coordinates: 47°25′54″N 3°29′55″E
- Country: France
- Region: Bourgogne-Franche-Comté
- Department: Nièvre
- Arrondissement: Clamecy
- Canton: Clamecy

Government
  - Mayor (2020–2026): Jean-Michel Forget
- Area^{1}: 3.92 km^{2} (1.51 sq mi)
- Highest elevation: 217 m (712 ft)
- Lowest elevation: 152 m (499 ft)
- Population (2023): 150
  - Density: 38/km^{2} (99/sq mi)
- Time zone: UTC+01:00 (CET)
  - Summer (DST): UTC+02:00 (CEST)
- INSEE/Postal code: 58222 /58500
- ^{1} French Land Register data, which excludes lakes, ponds, glaciers > 1 km^{2} (0.386 sq mi or 247 acres) and river estuaries.

Rix is a commune in the Nièvre department in central France.

== See also ==
- Communes of the Nièvre department
