= Armes, Nièvre =

Armes
- Commune
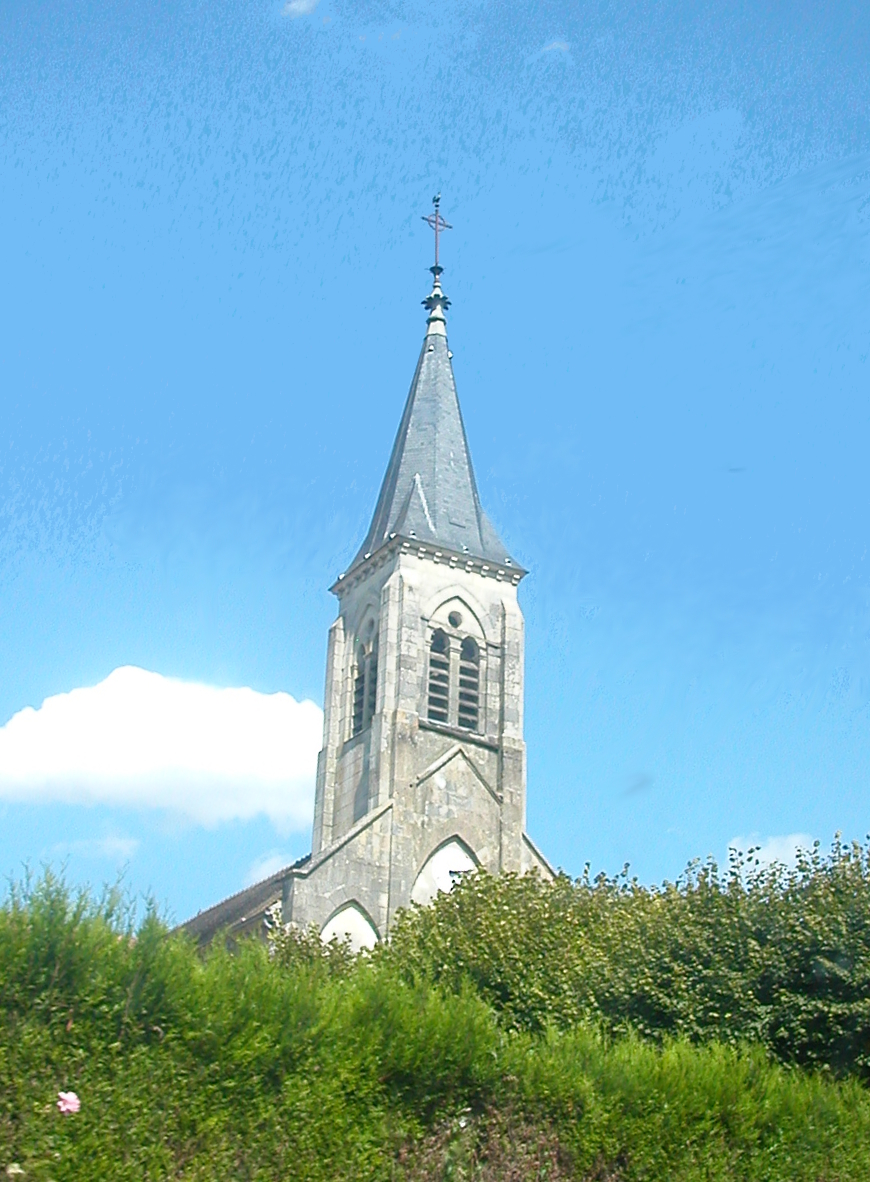
- The church in Armes

- Coat of arms
- Location of Armes
- Location within France Location within Bourgogne-Franche-Comté
- Coordinates: 47°27′34″N 3°32′55″E
- Country: France
- Region: Bourgogne-Franche-Comté
- Department: Nièvre
- Arrondissement: Clamecy
- Canton: Clamecy
- Intercommunality: CC Haut Nivernais Val d'Yonne

Government
  - Mayor (2020–2026): Françoise Wittmer
- Area^{1}: 8.49 km^{2} (3.28 sq mi)
- Highest elevation: 252 m (827 ft)
- Lowest elevation: 147 m (482 ft)
- Population (2023): 266
  - Density: 31.3/km^{2} (81.1/sq mi)
- Time zone: UTC+01:00 (CET)
  - Summer (DST): UTC+02:00 (CEST)
- INSEE/Postal code: 58011 /58500
- ^{1} French Land Register data, which excludes lakes, ponds, glaciers > 1 km^{2} (0.386 sq mi or 247 acres) and river estuaries.

Armes (French pronunciation: [aʁm]) is a commune in the Nièvre department in central France.

== Population ==
Historical population
Year	Pop.	±% p.a.
1968	307	—
1975	325	+0.82%
1982	293	−1.47%
1990	244	−2.26%
1999	279	+1.50%
2007	288	+0.40%
2012	303	+1.02%
2017	283	−1.36%
2023	266	−1.03%
Source: INSEE

== See also ==
- Communes of the Nièvre department
