= Villiers-sur-Yonne =

- Commune
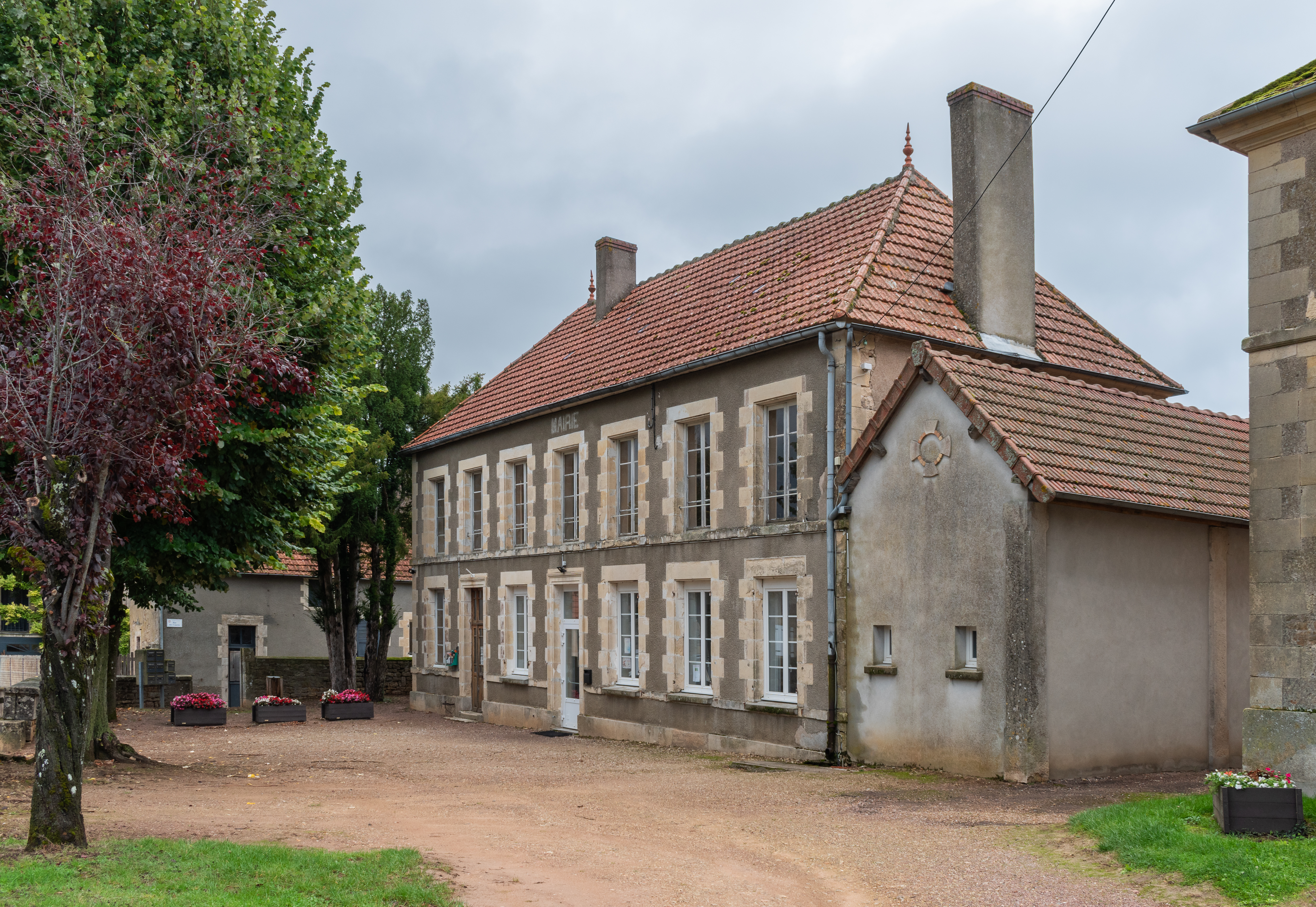
- The town hall in Villiers-sur-Yonne

- Coat of arms
- Location of Villiers-sur-Yonne
- Location within France Location within Bourgogne-Franche-Comté
- Coordinates: 47°24′42″N 3°34′35″E
- Country: France
- Region: Bourgogne-Franche-Comté
- Department: Nièvre
- Arrondissement: Clamecy
- Canton: Clamecy

Government
  - Mayor (2020–2026): Stéphane Brisorgueil
- Area^{1}: 15.86 km^{2} (6.12 sq mi)
- Highest elevation: 280 m (920 ft)
- Lowest elevation: 150 m (490 ft)
- Population (2023): 267
  - Density: 16.8/km^{2} (43.6/sq mi)
- Time zone: UTC+01:00 (CET)
  - Summer (DST): UTC+02:00 (CEST)
- INSEE/Postal code: 58312 /58500
- ^{1} French Land Register data, which excludes lakes, ponds, glaciers > 1 km^{2} (0.386 sq mi or 247 acres) and river estuaries.

Villiers-sur-Yonne (French pronunciation: [vilje syʁ jɔn]) is a commune in the Nièvre department in central France.

== See also ==
- Communes of the Nièvre department
