= Lys, Nièvre =

Lys
- Commune
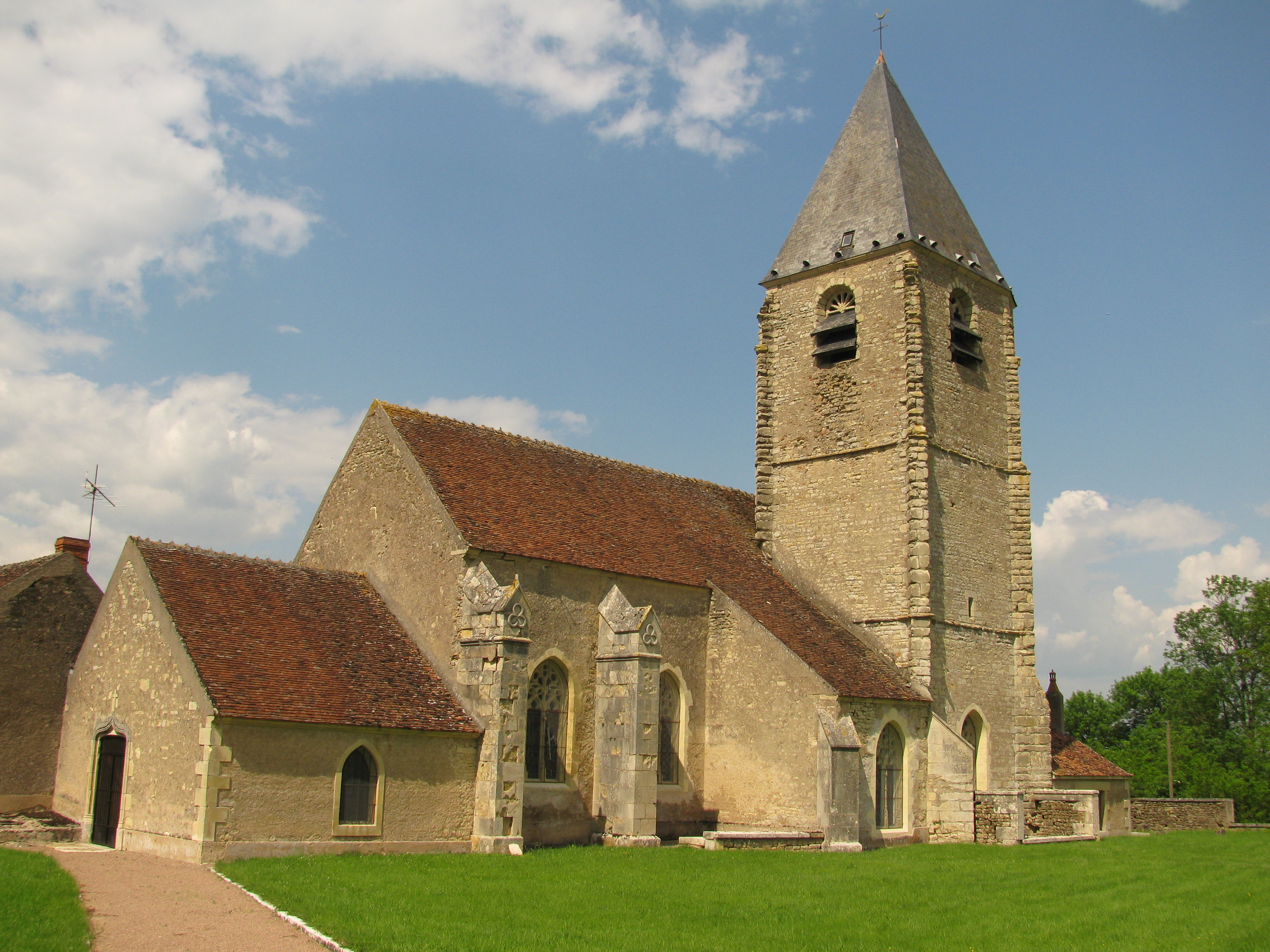
- The church of Saint-Martin, in Lys
- Location of Lys
- Location within France Location within Bourgogne-Franche-Comté
- Coordinates: 47°20′54″N 3°36′05″E
- Country: France
- Region: Bourgogne-Franche-Comté
- Department: Nièvre
- Arrondissement: Clamecy
- Canton: Clamecy
- Intercommunality: Tannay-Brinon-Corbigny

Government
  - Mayor (2020–2026): Jacques Chassot
- Area^{1}: 10.67 km^{2} (4.12 sq mi)
- Highest elevation: 312 m (1,024 ft)
- Lowest elevation: 172 m (564 ft)
- Population (2023): 104
  - Density: 9.75/km^{2} (25.2/sq mi)
- Time zone: UTC+01:00 (CET)
  - Summer (DST): UTC+02:00 (CEST)
- INSEE/Postal code: 58150 /58190
- ^{1} French Land Register data, which excludes lakes, ponds, glaciers > 1 km^{2} (0.386 sq mi or 247 acres) and river estuaries.

Lys is a commune in the Nièvre department in central France.

== See also ==
- Communes of the Nièvre department
