= Dornecy =

- Commune
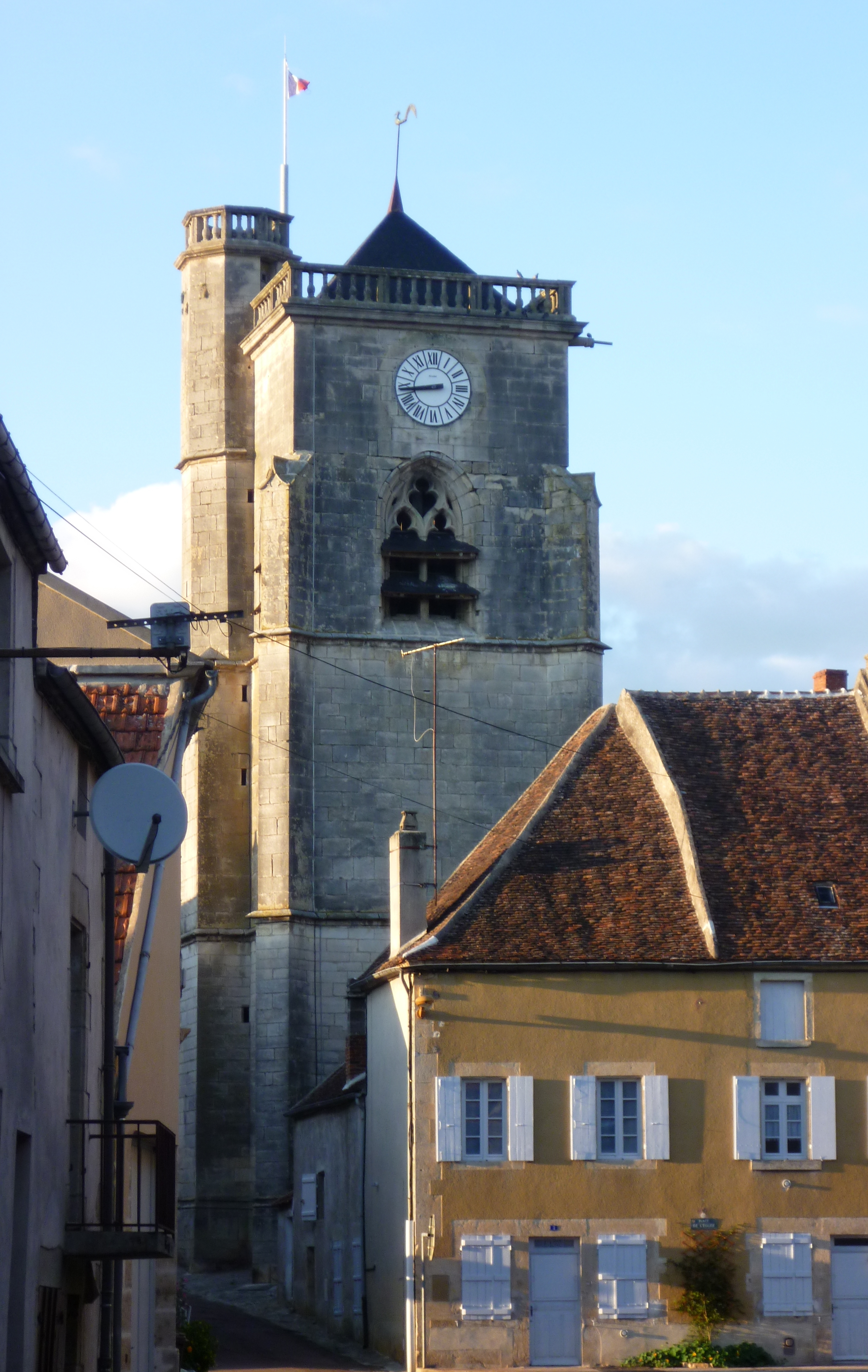
- The church in Dornecy
- Location of Dornecy
- Location within France Location within Bourgogne-Franche-Comté
- Coordinates: 47°26′12″N 3°35′07″E
- Country: France
- Region: Bourgogne-Franche-Comté
- Department: Nièvre
- Arrondissement: Clamecy
- Canton: Clamecy

Government
  - Mayor (2020–2026): Guy Bonhomme
- Area^{1}: 17.35 km^{2} (6.70 sq mi)
- Highest elevation: 273 m (896 ft)
- Lowest elevation: 147 m (482 ft)
- Population (2023): 451
  - Density: 26.0/km^{2} (67.3/sq mi)
- Time zone: UTC+01:00 (CET)
  - Summer (DST): UTC+02:00 (CEST)
- INSEE/Postal code: 58103 /58530
- ^{1} French Land Register data, which excludes lakes, ponds, glaciers > 1 km^{2} (0.386 sq mi or 247 acres) and river estuaries.

Dornecy (French pronunciation: [dɔʁnəsi]) is a commune in the Nièvre department in central France.

== See also ==
- Communes of the Nièvre department
