= Saint-Aubin-des-Chaumes =

- Commune
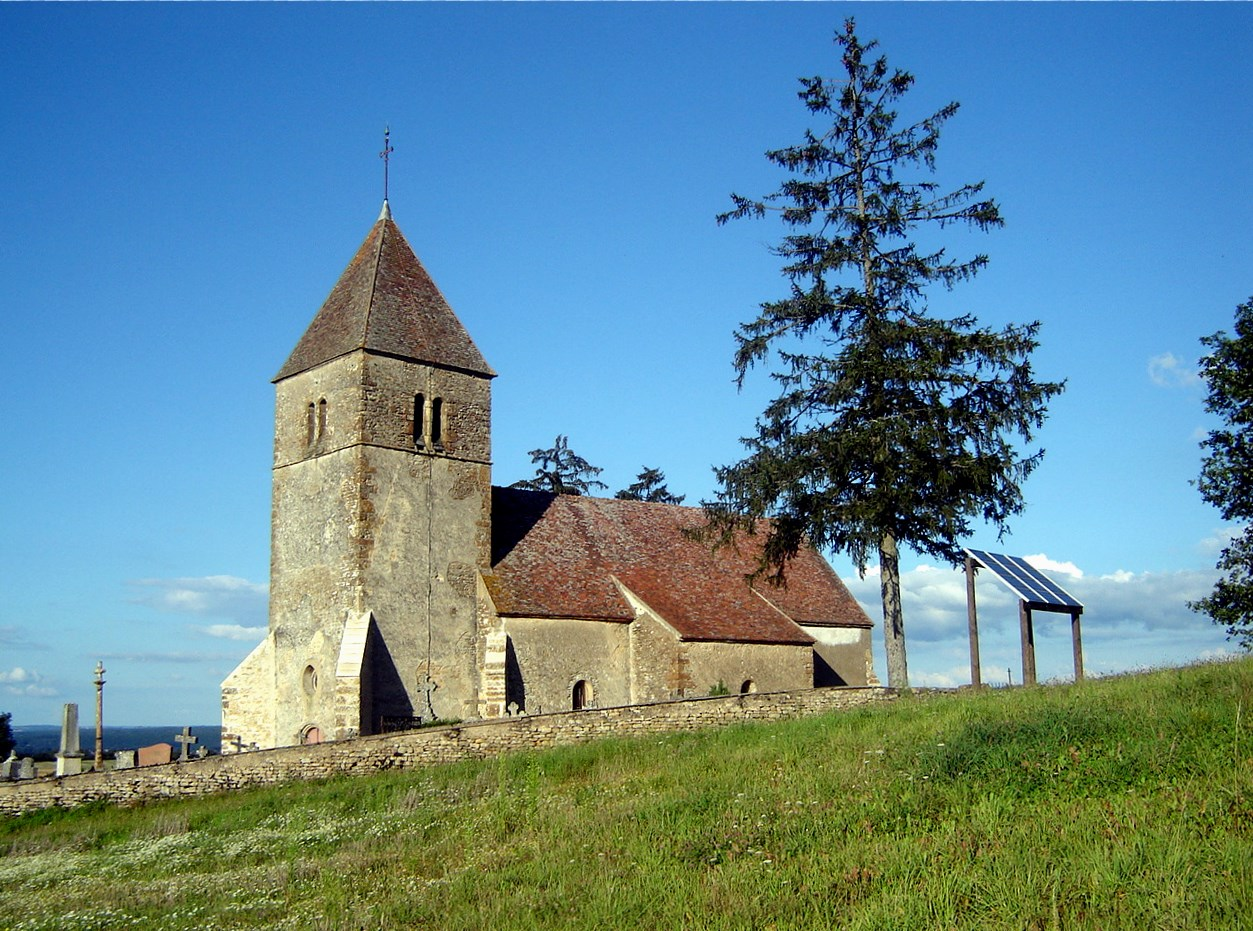
- The church in Saint-Aubin-des-Chaumes
- Location of Saint-Aubin-des-Chaumes
- Location within France Location within Bourgogne-Franche-Comté
- Coordinates: 47°23′38″N 3°45′12″E
- Country: France
- Region: Bourgogne-Franche-Comté
- Department: Nièvre
- Arrondissement: Clamecy
- Canton: Clamecy
- Intercommunality: Tannay-Brinon-Corbigny

Government
  - Mayor (2020–2026): Etienne Bera
- Area^{1}: 10.58 km^{2} (4.08 sq mi)
- Highest elevation: 360 m (1,180 ft)
- Lowest elevation: 174 m (571 ft)
- Population (2023): 70
  - Density: 6.6/km^{2} (17/sq mi)
- Time zone: UTC+01:00 (CET)
  - Summer (DST): UTC+02:00 (CEST)
- INSEE/Postal code: 58230 /58190
- ^{1} French Land Register data, which excludes lakes, ponds, glaciers > 1 km^{2} (0.386 sq mi or 247 acres) and river estuaries.

Saint-Aubin-des-Chaumes (French pronunciation: [sɛ̃.t‿obɛ̃ de ʃom]) is a commune in the Nièvre department in central France.

== See also ==
- Communes of the Nièvre department
