= Flez-Cuzy =

- Commune
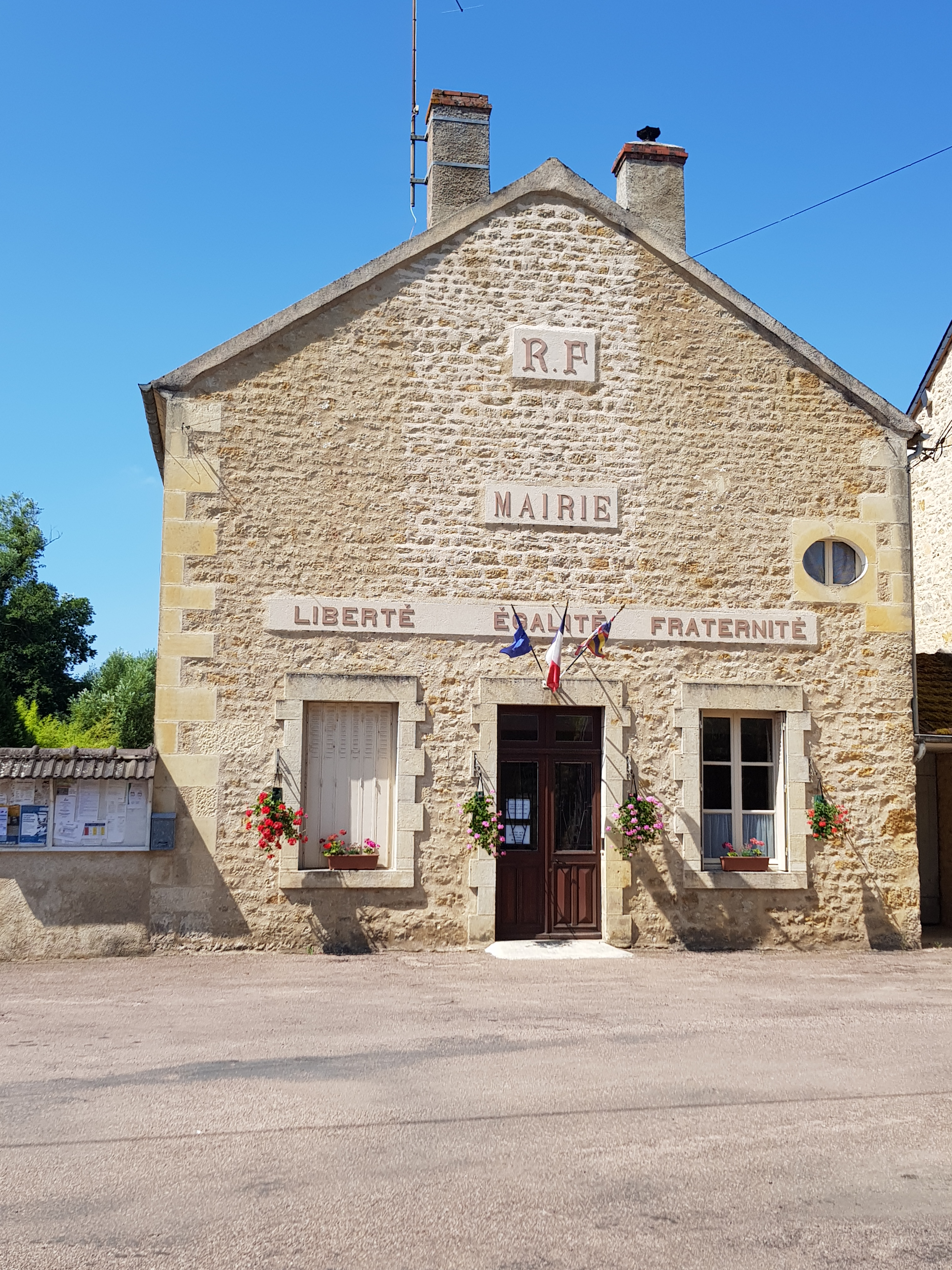
- Town hall
- Location of Flez-Cuzy
- Location within France Location within Bourgogne-Franche-Comté
- Coordinates: 47°21′51″N 3°37′26″E
- Country: France
- Region: Bourgogne-Franche-Comté
- Department: Nièvre
- Arrondissement: Clamecy
- Canton: Clamecy

Government
  - Mayor (2020–2026): Patrick Rousset
- Area^{1}: 5.92 km^{2} (2.29 sq mi)
- Highest elevation: 276 m (906 ft)
- Lowest elevation: 162 m (531 ft)
- Population (2023): 134
  - Density: 22.6/km^{2} (58.6/sq mi)
- Time zone: UTC+01:00 (CET)
  - Summer (DST): UTC+02:00 (CEST)
- INSEE/Postal code: 58116 /58190
- ^{1} French Land Register data, which excludes lakes, ponds, glaciers > 1 km^{2} (0.386 sq mi or 247 acres) and river estuaries.

Flez-Cuzy (French pronunciation: [fle kyzi]) is a commune in the Nièvre department in central France.

== See also ==
- Communes of the Nièvre department
