= Monceaux-le-Comte =

- Commune
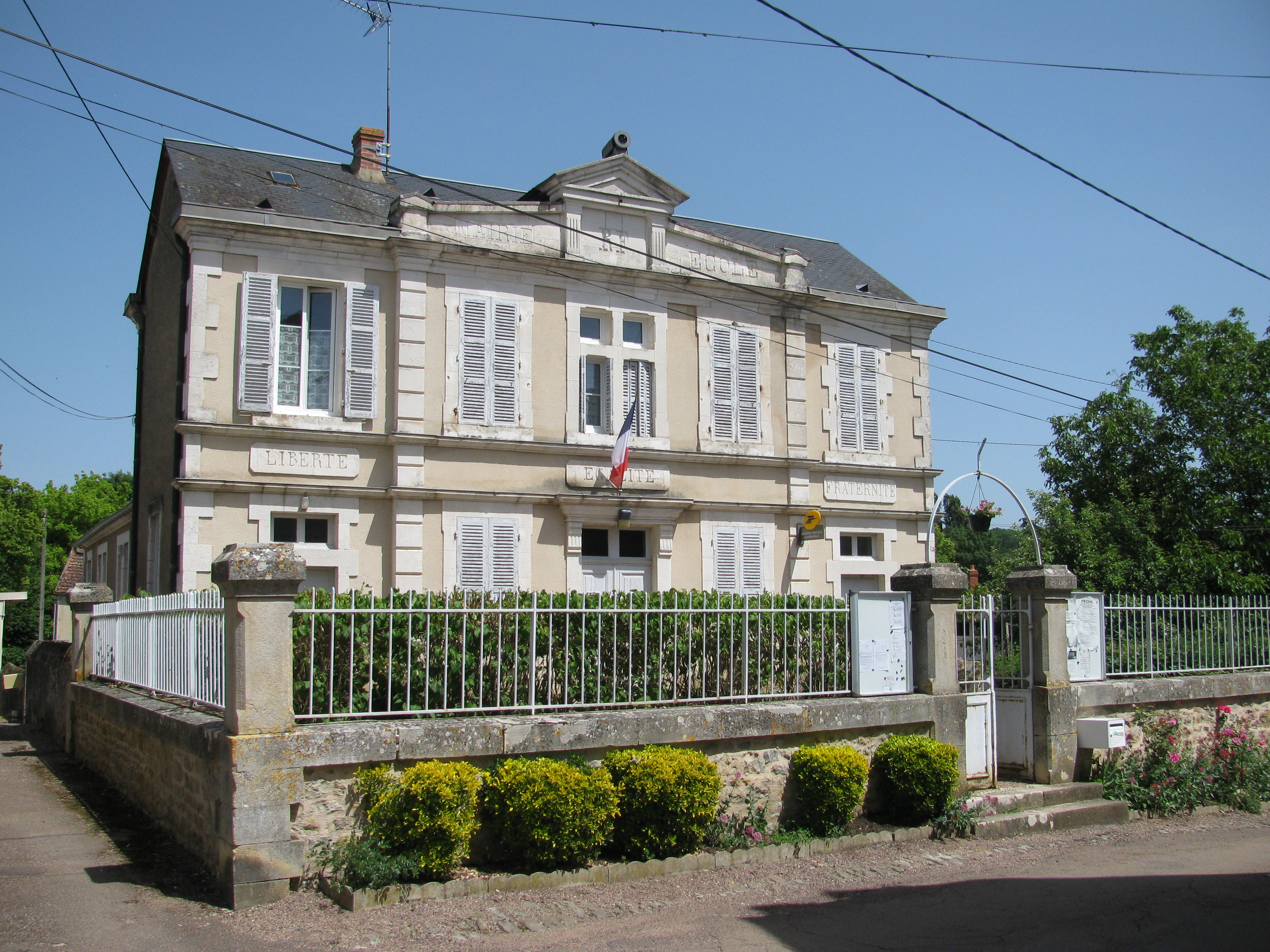
- The town hall in Monceaux-le-Comte
- Location of Monceaux-le-Comte
- Location within France Location within Bourgogne-Franche-Comté
- Coordinates: 47°19′47″N 3°39′44″E
- Country: France
- Region: Bourgogne-Franche-Comté
- Department: Nièvre
- Arrondissement: Clamecy
- Canton: Clamecy
- Intercommunality: Tannay-Brinon-Corbigny

Government
  - Mayor (2020–2026): Françoise Corbeau-Mougne
- Area^{1}: 3.28 km^{2} (1.27 sq mi)
- Highest elevation: 242 m (794 ft)
- Lowest elevation: 169 m (554 ft)
- Population (2023): 128
  - Density: 39.0/km^{2} (101/sq mi)
- Time zone: UTC+01:00 (CET)
  - Summer (DST): UTC+02:00 (CEST)
- INSEE/Postal code: 58170 /58190
- ^{1} French Land Register data, which excludes lakes, ponds, glaciers > 1 km^{2} (0.386 sq mi or 247 acres) and river estuaries.

Monceaux-le-Comte (French pronunciation: [mɔ̃so lə kɔ̃t]) is a commune in the Nièvre department in central France.

It lies on the Nivernais Canal, which parallels the river Yonne.

== History ==
There is evidence of occupation at the site from the Roman era.

== Demographics ==
The population of the village which totals just over 120 is mostly French, although in recent years a number of other nationalities have moved into the village permanently or semi-permanently, including British, Dutch and Germans.

The village still has numerous residents whose families have lived in the village for centuries and constituted most of the original population.

== Monuments ==
The church replaces a Romanesque one dating back to the 12th century, and services are held there on a rota with other churches in the region. A feature for visitors to the church is a rare 14th century white marble statue of The Virgin breast-feeding the infant Christ.

The village cemetery is located along the road from the church, just outside the village.

== Tourism ==
The outskirts of the village are fields where sheep and cattle are grazed.

The village has an épicerie or grocery store and a boulangerie located in the main square both of which are frequented by many tourists cycling or walking in the area or travelling along the canal in barges and boats.

The Mairie (also in the main square) built between 1889 and 1891 doubles as the small village school and branch post office, and organizes celebrations on Bastille Day every year. An evening firework display attracts visitors from all the surrounding villages and towns and follows afternoon games events at which prizes are presented.

The village also contains an art and tourism centre which presents exhibitions and events throughout the year. A Salle des Fêtes is situated near the river and is available to residents for family events as well as being used for community events.

A fishing competition along the banks of the canal is also held every 15 August and attracts over one hundred competitors every year. The Auberge du Centre, located next to the church, is also very popular with tourists, as the proprietors speak several languages and have a range of menus of international and local dishes. There has been an active restaurant on this site for over 100 years.

== See also ==
- Communes of the Nièvre department
