= Moissy-Moulinot =

- Commune
- Location of Moissy-Moulinot
- Location within France Location within Bourgogne-Franche-Comté
- Coordinates: 47°19′53″N 3°41′56″E
- Country: France
- Region: Bourgogne-Franche-Comté
- Department: Nièvre
- Arrondissement: Clamecy
- Canton: Clamecy

Government
  - Mayor (2020–2026): Gérard Genet
- Area^{1}: 2.81 km^{2} (1.08 sq mi)
- Highest elevation: 312 m (1,024 ft)
- Lowest elevation: 189 m (620 ft)
- Population (2023): 14
  - Density: 5.0/km^{2} (13/sq mi)
- Time zone: UTC+01:00 (CET)
  - Summer (DST): UTC+02:00 (CEST)
- INSEE/Postal code: 58169 /58190
- ^{1} French Land Register data, which excludes lakes, ponds, glaciers > 1 km^{2} (0.386 sq mi or 247 acres) and river estuaries.

Moissy-Moulinot (French pronunciation: [mwasi mulino]) is a commune in the Nièvre department in central France, Bourgogne-Franche-Comté.

== Geography ==
The commune is composed of two localities :

- Moissy
- Le Moulinot

== Demographics ==
Historical population
Year	Pop.	±% p.a.
1968	27	—
1975	28	+0.52%
1982	27	−0.52%
1990	21	−3.09%
1999	26	+2.40%
2007	26	+0.00%
2012	25	−0.78%
2017	18	−6.36%
2023	14	−4.10%
Source: INSEE

As of 2023, the population was 14, making Moissy-Moulinot the least populous commune of Nièvre department.

== See also ==
- Communes of the Nièvre department
