= La Maison-Dieu =

- Commune
- Location of La Maison-Dieu
- Location within France Location within Bourgogne-Franche-Comté
- Coordinates: 47°24′51″N 3°38′51″E
- Country: France
- Region: Bourgogne-Franche-Comté
- Department: Nièvre
- Arrondissement: Clamecy
- Canton: Clamecy

Government
  - Mayor (2020–2026): Joseph Guillem
- Area^{1}: 13.82 km^{2} (5.34 sq mi)
- Highest elevation: 331 m (1,086 ft)
- Lowest elevation: 186 m (610 ft)
- Population (2023): 113
  - Density: 8.18/km^{2} (21.2/sq mi)
- Time zone: UTC+01:00 (CET)
  - Summer (DST): UTC+02:00 (CEST)
- INSEE/Postal code: 58154 /58190
- ^{1} French Land Register data, which excludes lakes, ponds, glaciers > 1 km^{2} (0.386 sq mi or 247 acres) and river estuaries.

La Maison-Dieu (French pronunciation: [la mɛzɔ̃ djø]) is a commune in the Nièvre department in central France.

== Demographics ==
Historical population
Year	Pop.	±% p.a.
1968	172	—
1975	165	−0.59%
1982	152	−1.17%
1990	133	−1.66%
1999	122	−0.95%
2007	127	+0.50%
2012	135	+1.23%
2017	121	−2.17%
2023	113	−1.13%
Source: INSEE

== See also ==
- Communes of the Nièvre department
