= Asnois, Nièvre =

Asnois
- Commune
- Location of Asnois
- Location within France Location within Bourgogne-Franche-Comté
- Coordinates: 47°23′58″N 3°35′55″E
- Country: France
- Region: Bourgogne-Franche-Comté
- Department: Nièvre
- Arrondissement: Clamecy
- Canton: Clamecy
- Intercommunality: CC Tannay-Brinon-Corbigny

Government
  - Mayor (2020–2026): Christophe Deniaux
- Area^{1}: 5.69 km^{2} (2.20 sq mi)
- Highest elevation: 299 m (981 ft)
- Lowest elevation: 157 m (515 ft)
- Population (2023): 141
  - Density: 24.8/km^{2} (64.2/sq mi)
- Time zone: UTC+01:00 (CET)
  - Summer (DST): UTC+02:00 (CEST)
- INSEE/Postal code: 58016 /58190
- ^{1} French Land Register data, which excludes lakes, ponds, glaciers > 1 km^{2} (0.386 sq mi or 247 acres) and river estuaries.

Asnois (French pronunciation: [anwa]) is a commune in the Nièvre department in central France.

== Population ==
Historical population
Year	Pop.	±% p.a.
1968	164	—
1975	132	−3.05%
1982	126	−0.66%
1990	143	+1.59%
1999	170	+1.94%
2007	158	−0.91%
2012	157	−0.13%
2017	146	−1.44%
2023	141	−0.58%
Source: INSEE

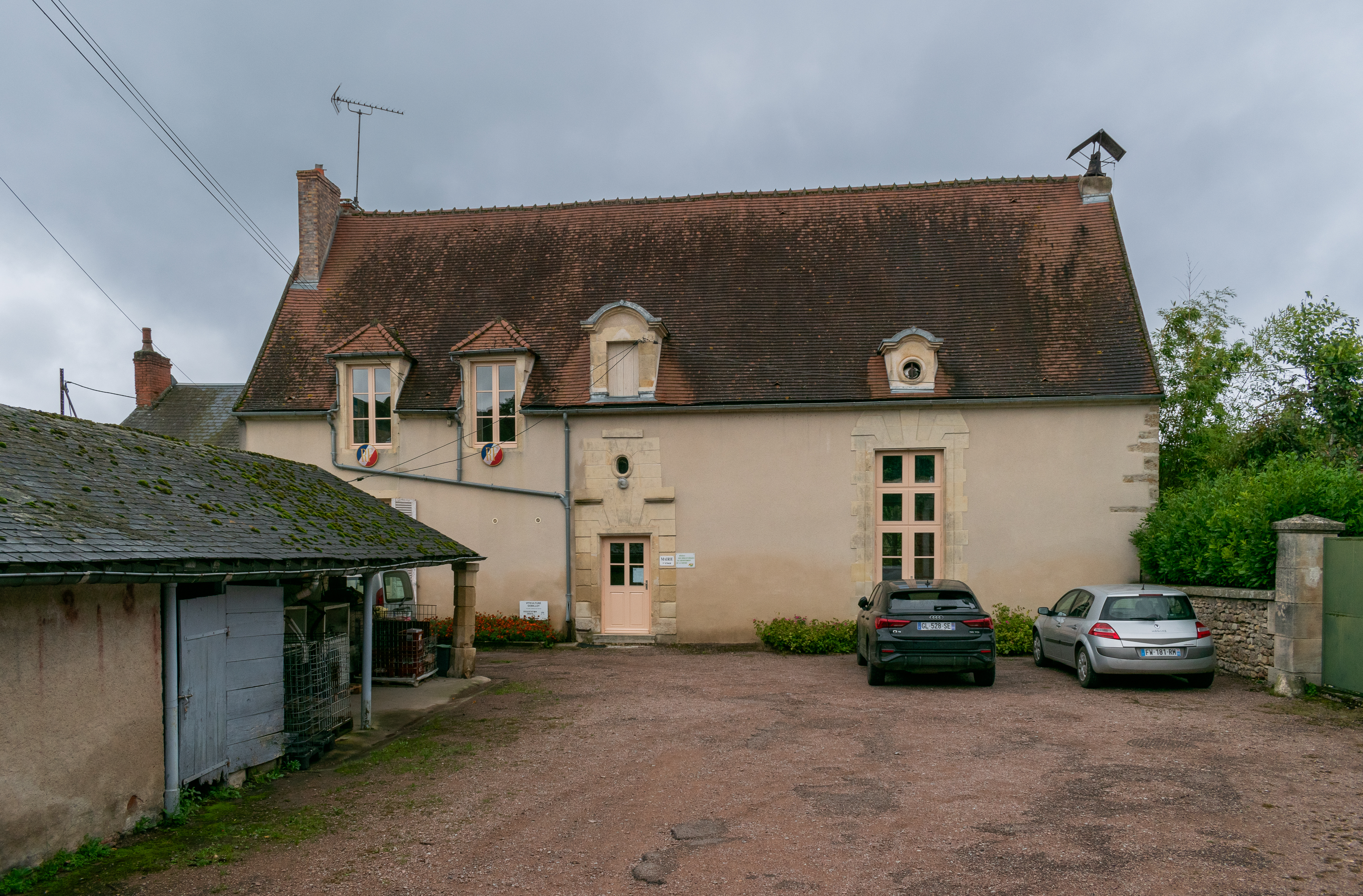
Town hall

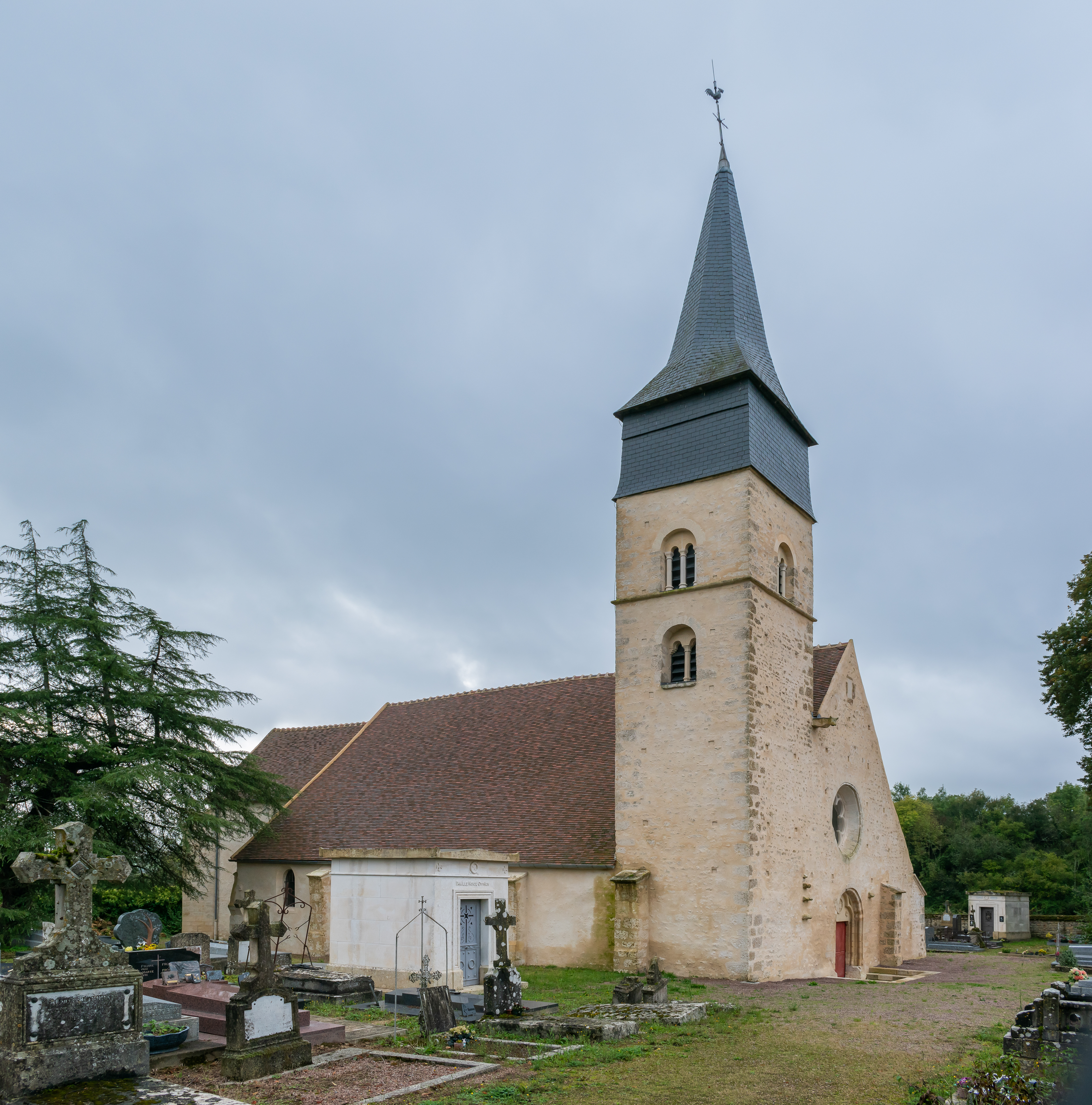
Saint Lupus church

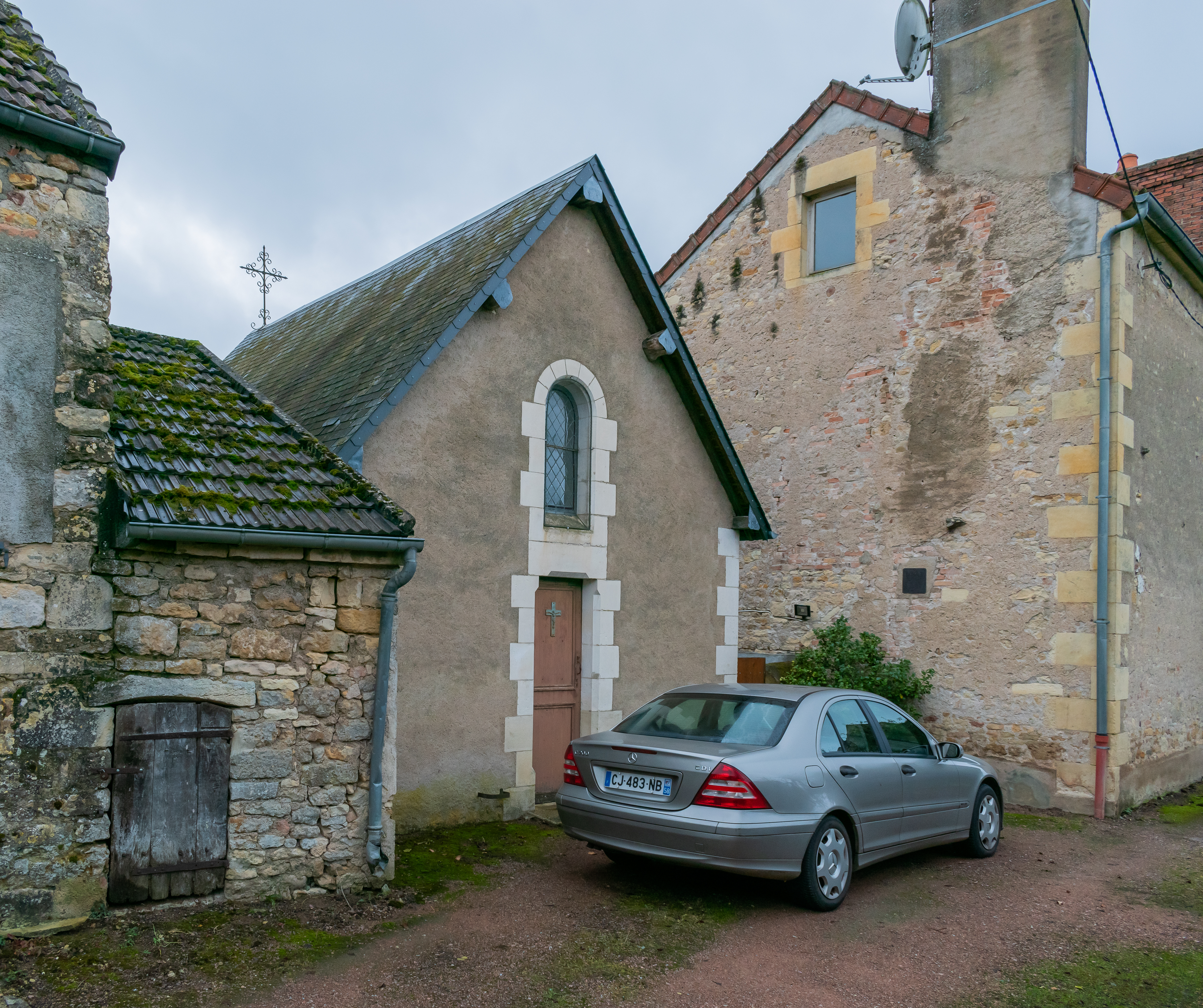
Former chapel

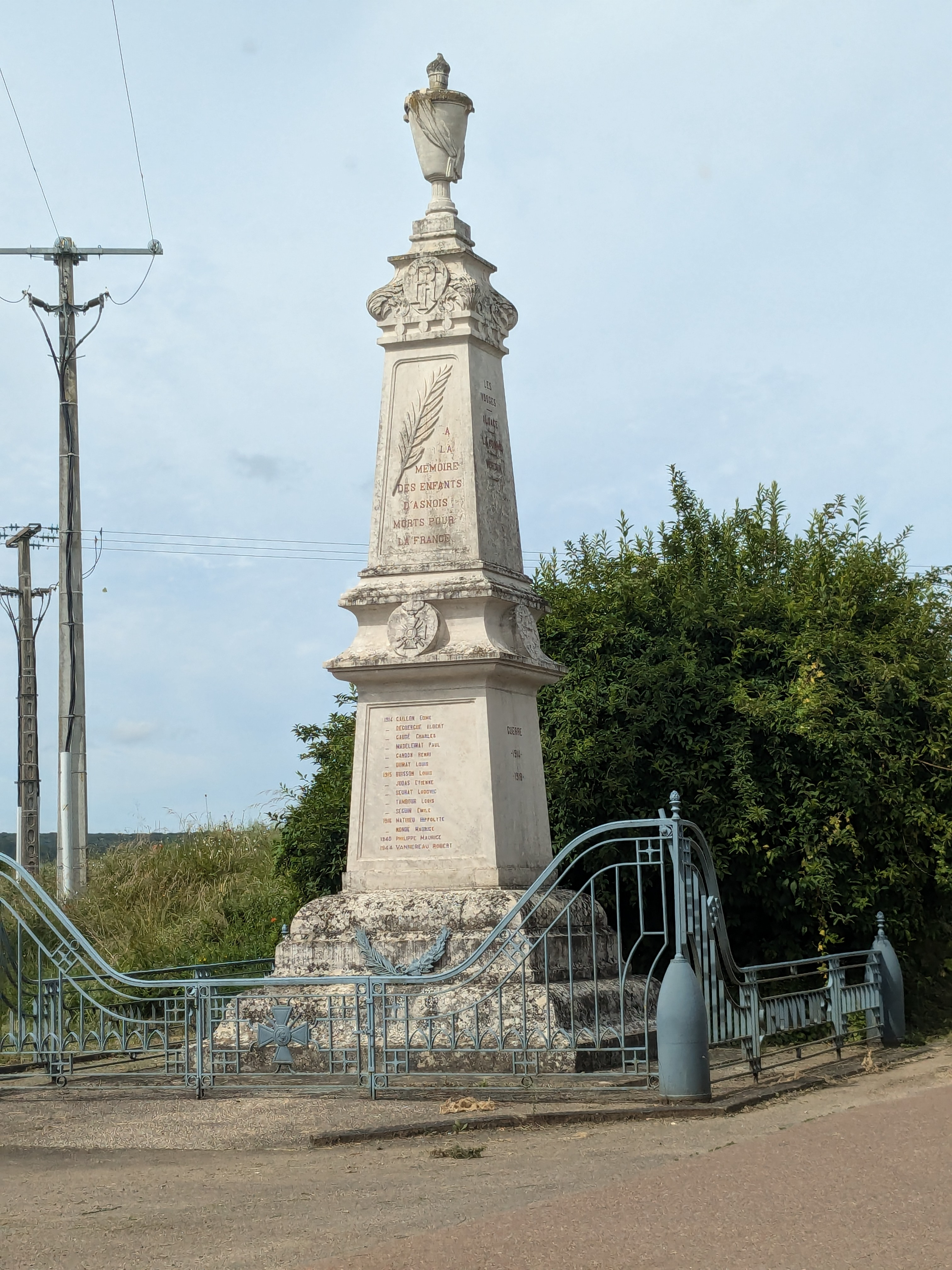
War memorial

== See also ==
- Communes of the Nièvre department
