= Saint-Germain-des-Bois, Nièvre =

Saint-Germain-des-Bois
- Commune
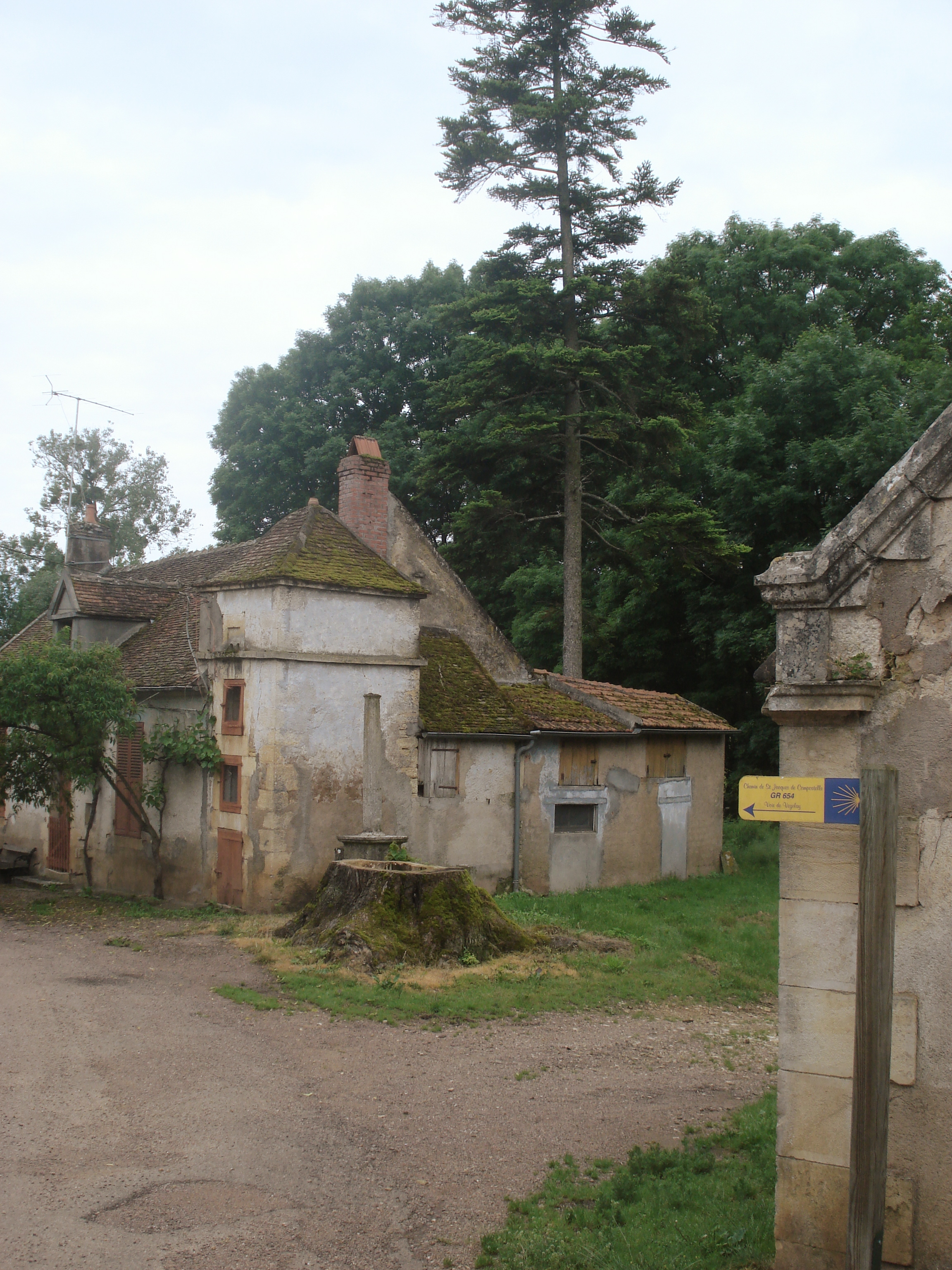
- The Via Lemovicensis in Thurigny

- Coat of arms
- Location of Saint-Germain-des-Bois
- Location within France Location within Bourgogne-Franche-Comté
- Coordinates: 47°22′42″N 3°30′45″E
- Country: France
- Region: Bourgogne-Franche-Comté
- Department: Nièvre
- Arrondissement: Clamecy
- Canton: Clamecy
- Intercommunality: Tannay-Brinon-Corbigny

Government
  - Mayor (2020–2026): Agnès Devoucoux
- Area^{1}: 12.43 km^{2} (4.80 sq mi)
- Highest elevation: 336 m (1,102 ft)
- Lowest elevation: 170 m (560 ft)
- Population (2023): 112
  - Density: 9.01/km^{2} (23.3/sq mi)
- Time zone: UTC+01:00 (CET)
  - Summer (DST): UTC+02:00 (CEST)
- INSEE/Postal code: 58242 /58210
- ^{1} French Land Register data, which excludes lakes, ponds, glaciers > 1 km^{2} (0.386 sq mi or 247 acres) and river estuaries.

Saint-Germain-des-Bois (French pronunciation: [sɛ̃ ʒɛʁmɛ̃ de bwa]) is a commune in the Nièvre department in central France.

== See also ==
- Communes of the Nièvre department
