= Billy-sur-Oisy =

- Commune
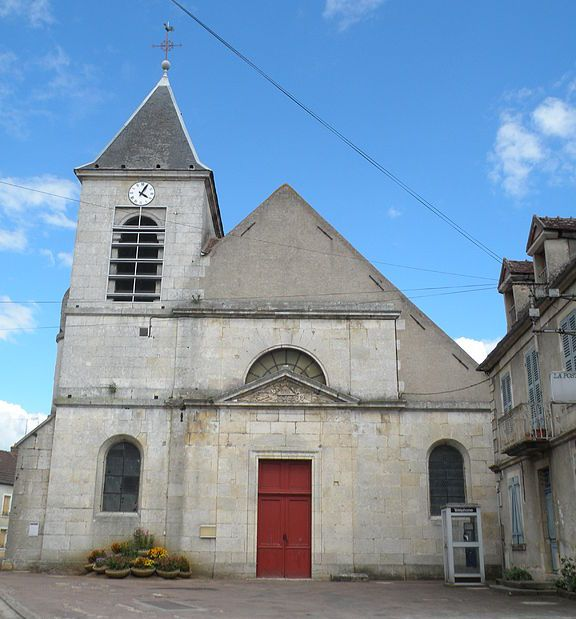
- The church in Billy-sur-Oisy
- Location of Billy-sur-Oisy
- Location within France Location within Bourgogne-Franche-Comté
- Coordinates: 47°28′49″N 3°24′48″E
- Country: France
- Region: Bourgogne-Franche-Comté
- Department: Nièvre
- Arrondissement: Clamecy
- Canton: Clamecy

Government
  - Mayor (2020–2026): Hervé Bourgeois
- Area^{1}: 26.65 km^{2} (10.29 sq mi)
- Highest elevation: 292 m (958 ft)
- Lowest elevation: 172 m (564 ft)
- Population (2023): 381
  - Density: 14.3/km^{2} (37.0/sq mi)
- Time zone: UTC+01:00 (CET)
  - Summer (DST): UTC+02:00 (CEST)
- INSEE/Postal code: 58032 /58500
- ^{1} French Land Register data, which excludes lakes, ponds, glaciers > 1 km^{2} (0.386 sq mi or 247 acres) and river estuaries.

Billy-sur-Oisy is a commune in the Nièvre department in central France.

== Population ==
Historical population
Year	Pop.	±% p.a.
1968	464	—
1975	427	−1.18%
1982	389	−1.32%
1990	392	+0.10%
1999	400	+0.22%
2007	415	+0.46%
2012	393	−1.08%
2017	370	−1.20%
2023	381	+0.49%
Source: INSEE

== Gallery ==
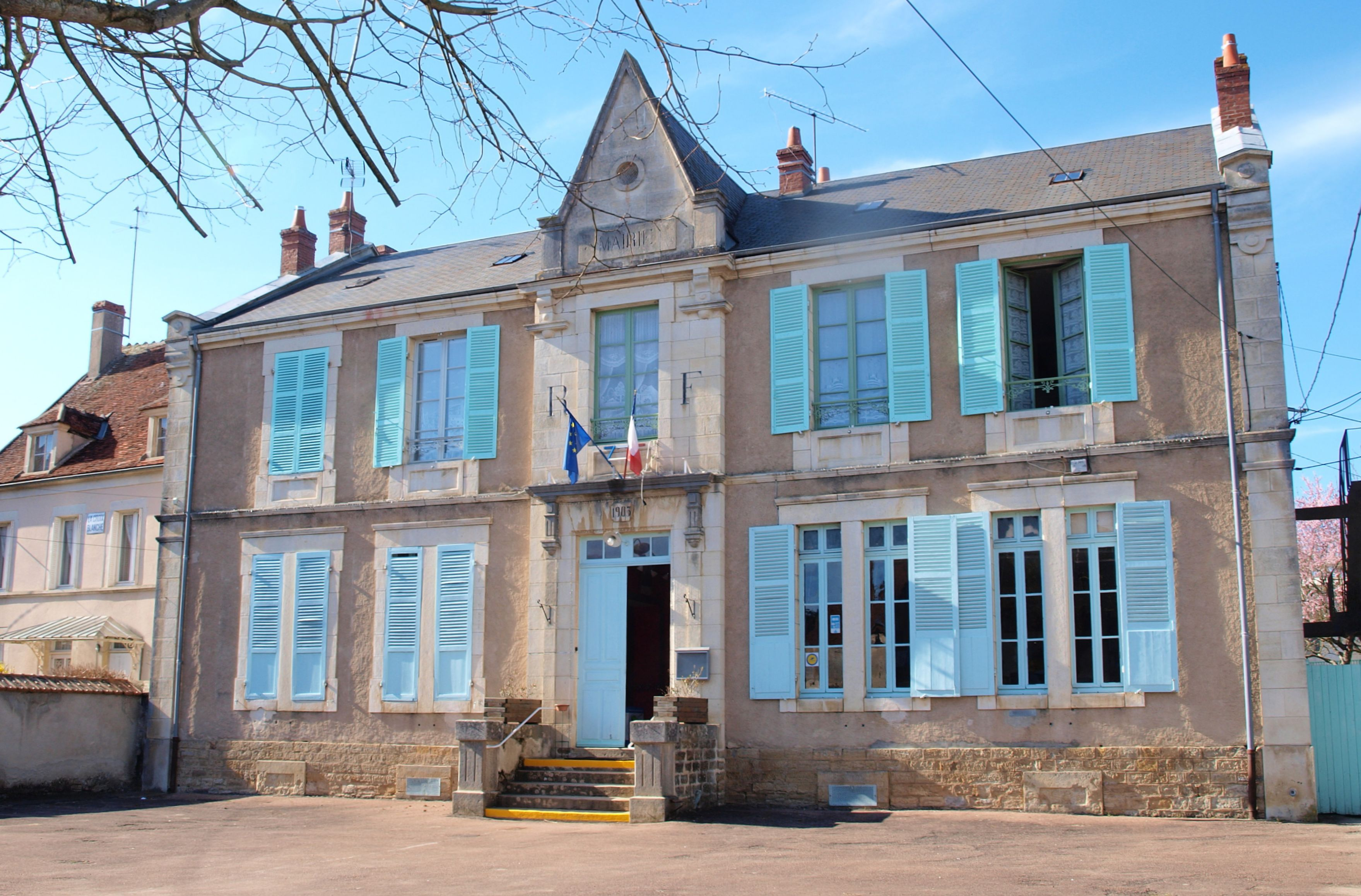
Town hall (mairie) and school

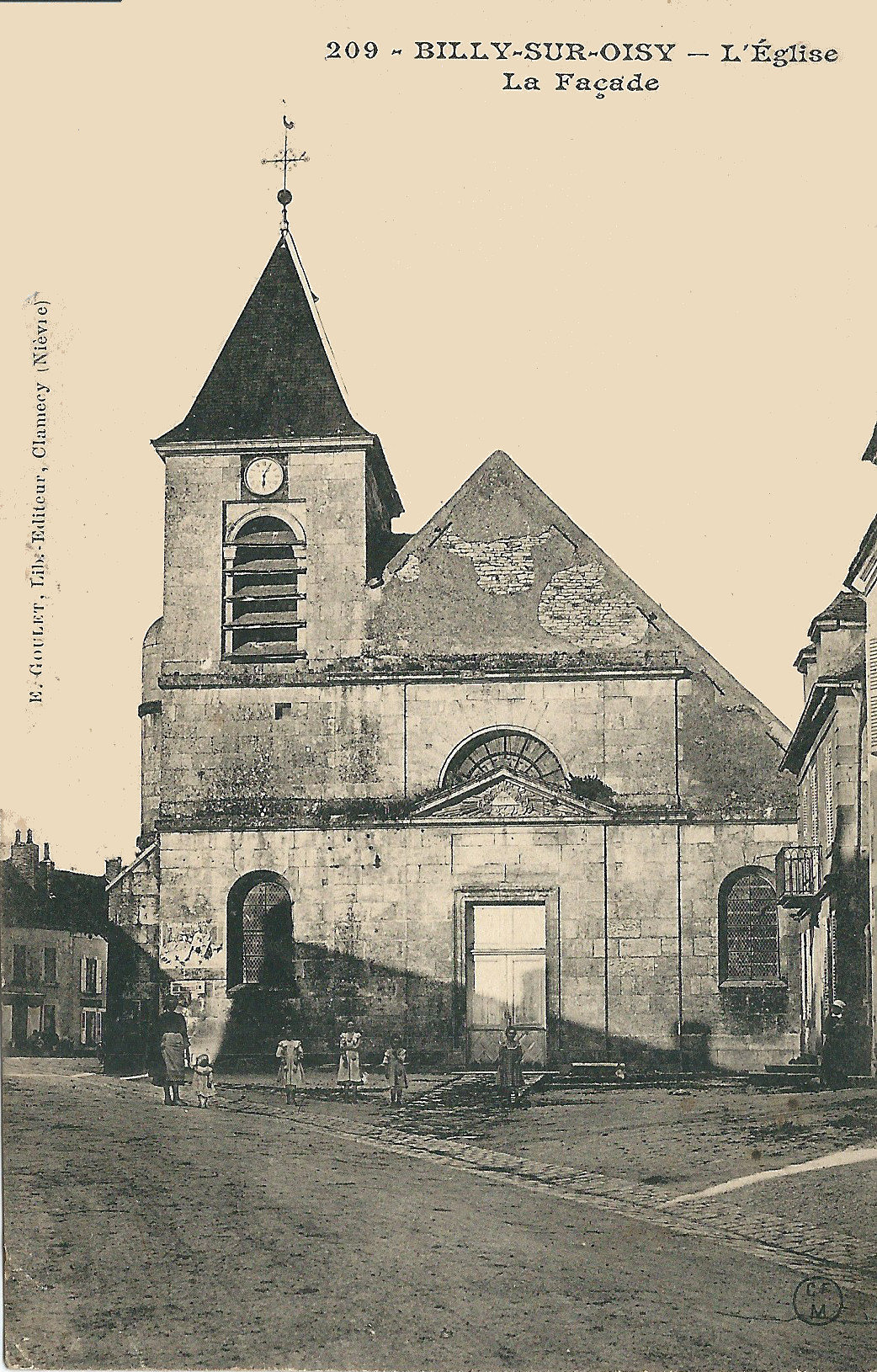
Church of St. Lawrence

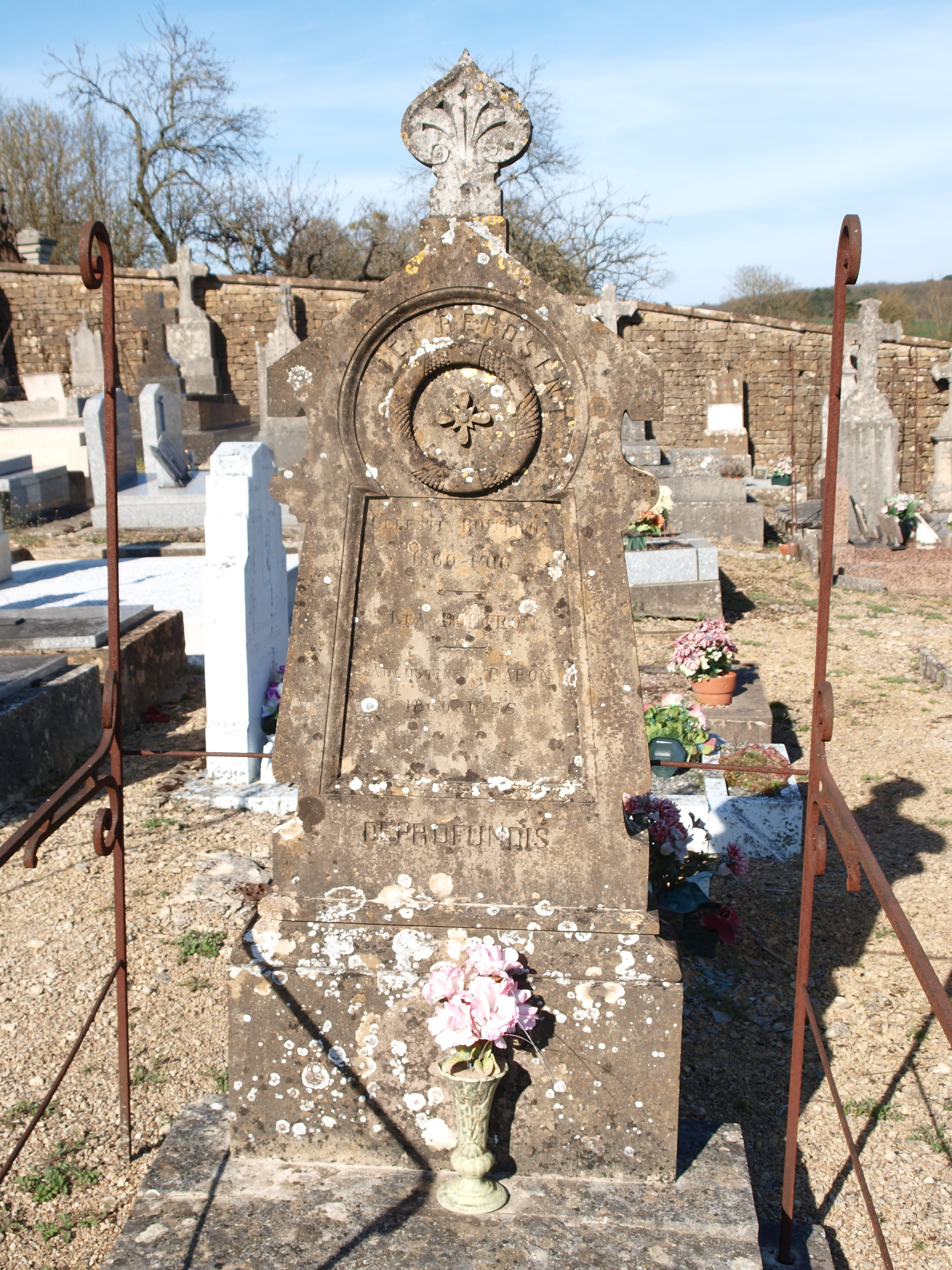
Cemetery

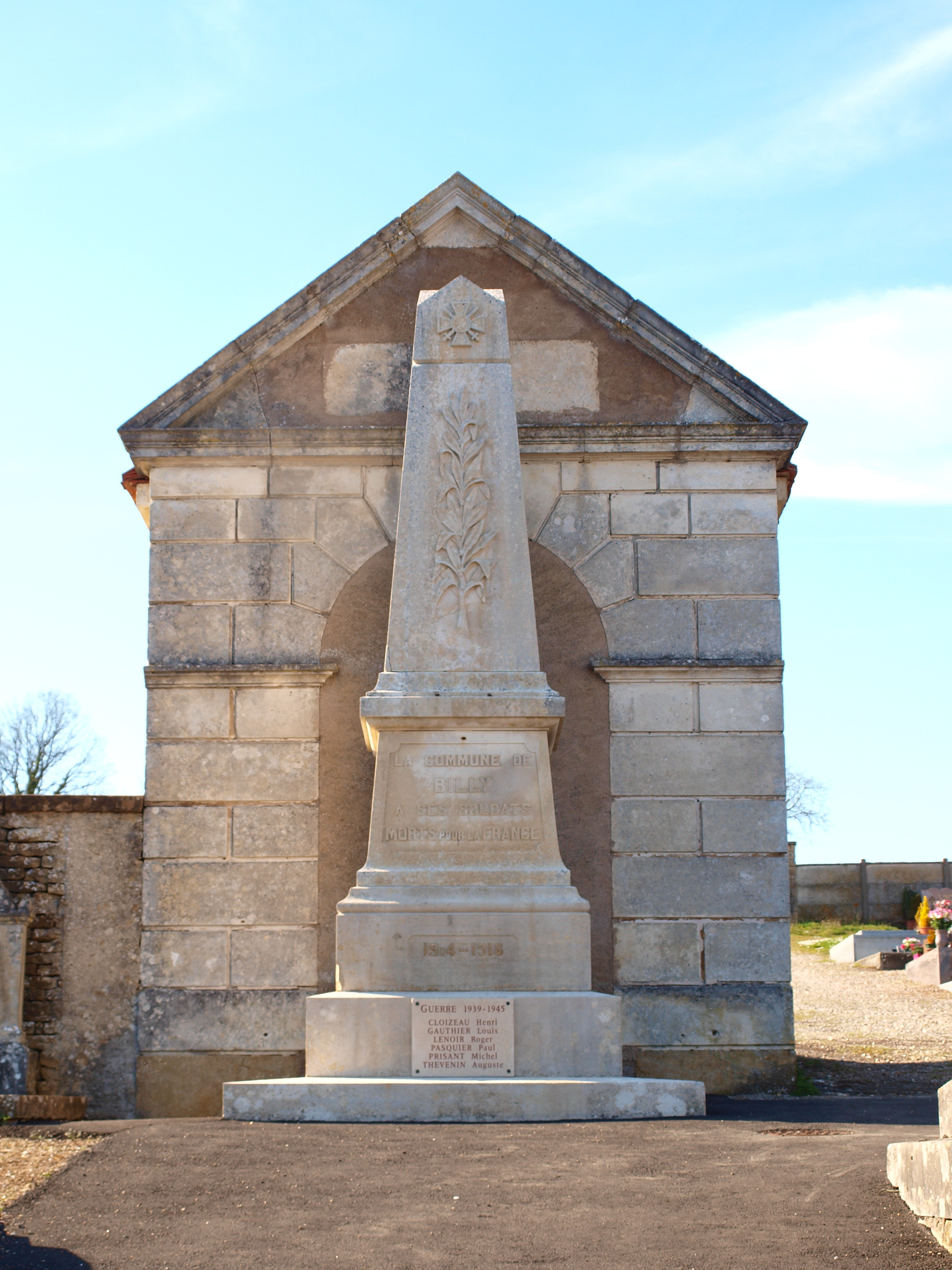
War memorial

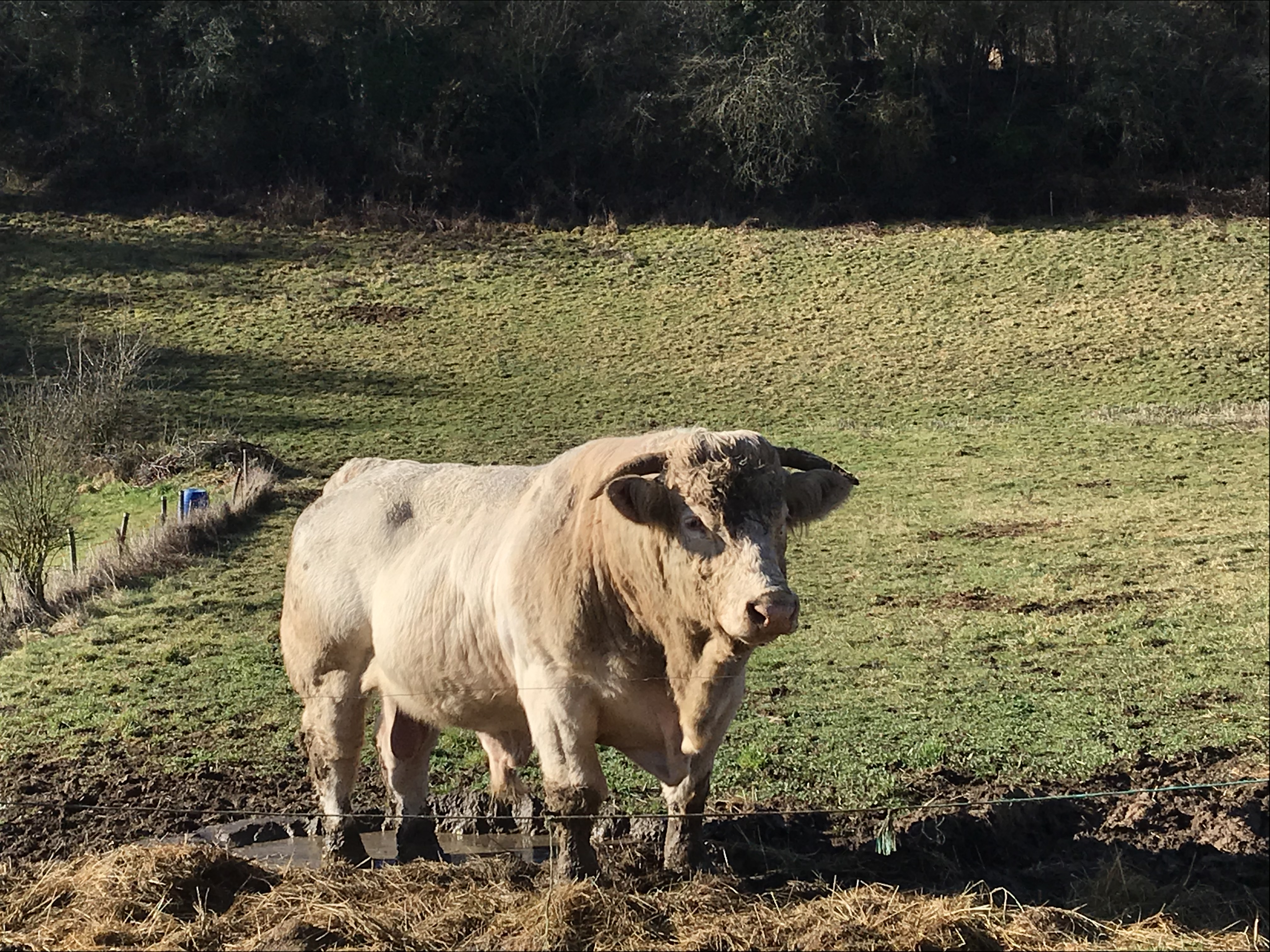
Livestock

== See also ==
- Communes of the Nièvre department
