= Varzy =

- Commune
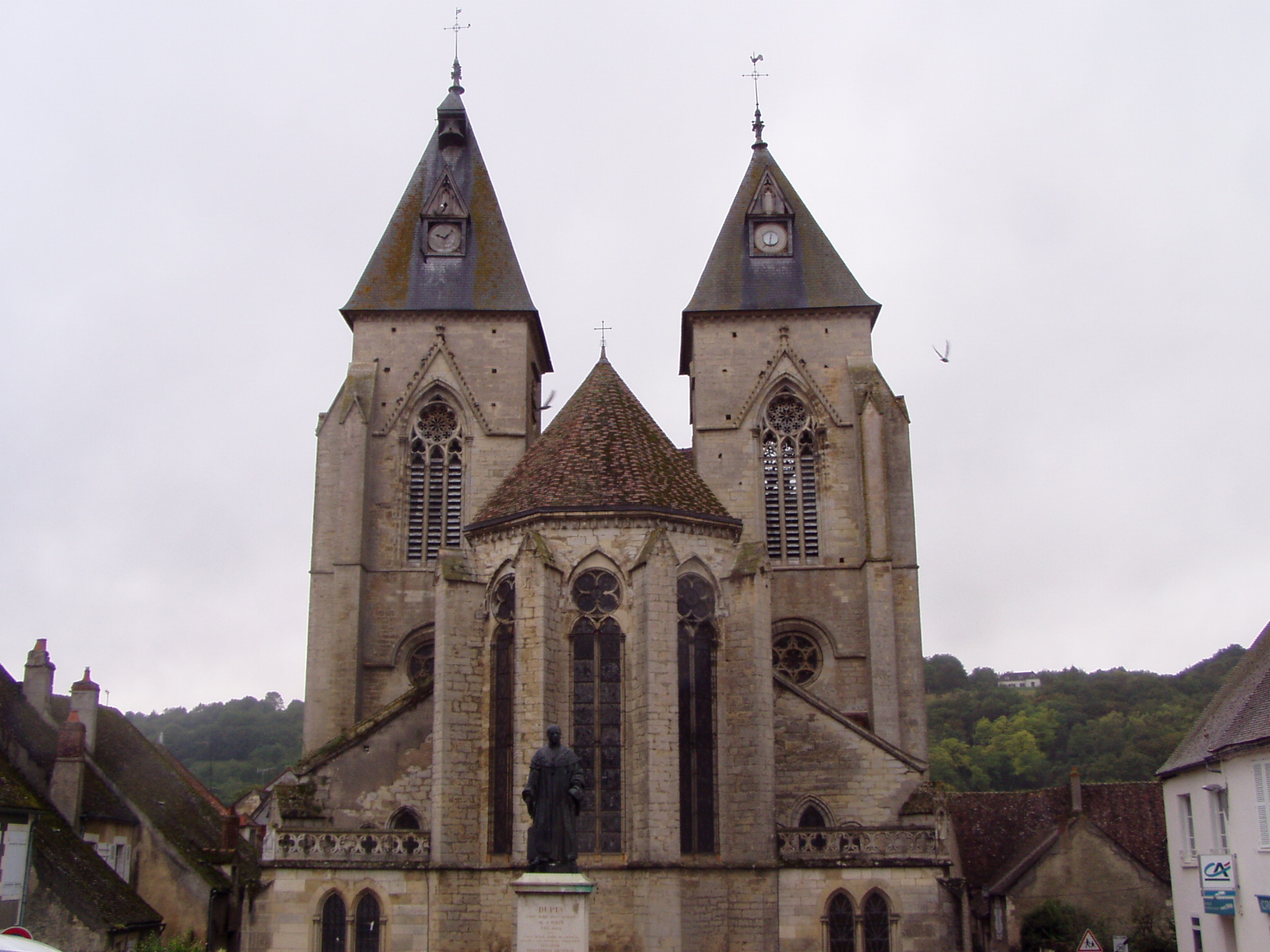
- The church in Varzy

- Coat of arms
- Location of Varzy
- Location within France Location within Bourgogne-Franche-Comté
- Coordinates: 47°21′35″N 3°23′14″E
- Country: France
- Region: Bourgogne-Franche-Comté
- Department: Nièvre
- Arrondissement: Clamecy
- Canton: Clamecy

Government
  - Mayor (2020–2026): Gilles Noël
- Area^{1}: 41.18 km^{2} (15.90 sq mi)
- Elevation: 220 m (720 ft)
- Highest elevation: 367 m (1,204 ft)
- Lowest elevation: 197 m (646 ft)
- Population (2023): 1,069
  - Density: 25.96/km^{2} (67.23/sq mi)
- Time zone: UTC+01:00 (CET)
  - Summer (DST): UTC+02:00 (CEST)
- INSEE/Postal code: 58304 /58210
- ^{1} French Land Register data, which excludes lakes, ponds, glaciers > 1 km^{2} (0.386 sq mi or 247 acres) and river estuaries.

Varzy (French pronunciation: [vaʁzi]) is a commune in the Nièvre department in central France.

== Demographics ==
Historical population
Year	Pop.	±% p.a.
1968	1,495	—
1975	1,459	−0.35%
1982	1,475	+0.16%
1990	1,455	−0.17%
1999	1,303	−1.22%
2007	1,358	+0.52%
2012	1,296	−0.93%
2017	1,215	−1.28%
2023	1,069	−2.11%
Source: INSEE

== See also ==
- Communes of the Nièvre department
