= Oisy, Nièvre =

Oisy
- Commune
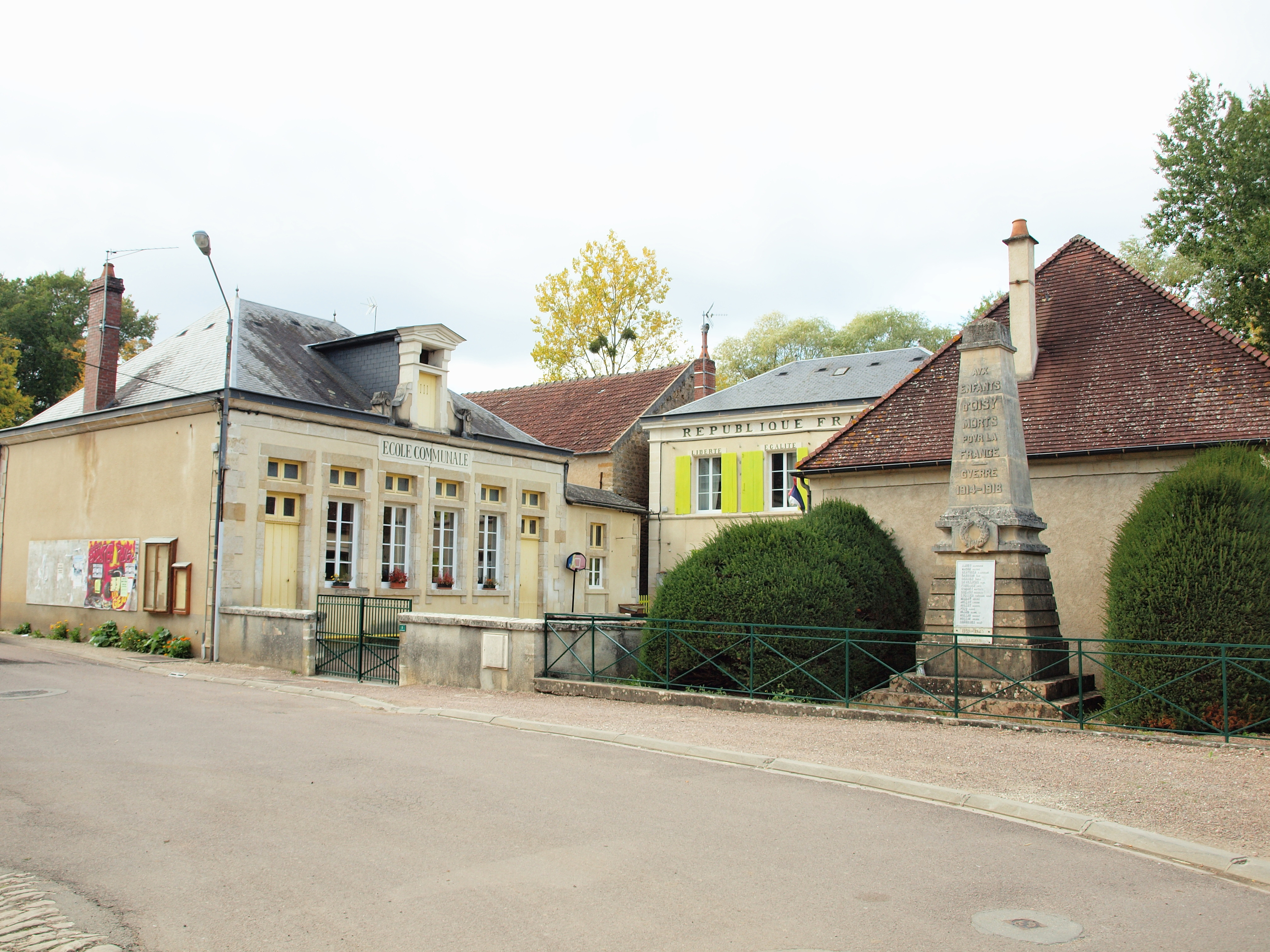
- Oisy Town hall
- Location of Oisy
- Location within France Location within Bourgogne-Franche-Comté
- Coordinates: 47°28′11″N 3°26′47″E
- Country: France
- Region: Bourgogne-Franche-Comté
- Department: Nièvre
- Arrondissement: Clamecy
- Canton: Clamecy

Government
  - Mayor (2020–2026): Brigitte Picq
- Area^{1}: 17.50 km^{2} (6.76 sq mi)
- Highest elevation: 286 m (938 ft)
- Lowest elevation: 157 m (515 ft)
- Population (2023): 305
  - Density: 17.4/km^{2} (45.1/sq mi)
- Time zone: UTC+01:00 (CET)
  - Summer (DST): UTC+02:00 (CEST)
- INSEE/Postal code: 58198 /58500
- ^{1} French Land Register data, which excludes lakes, ponds, glaciers > 1 km^{2} (0.386 sq mi or 247 acres) and river estuaries.

Oisy (French pronunciation: [wazi]) is a commune in the Nièvre department in central France.

== See also ==
- Communes of the Nièvre department
