= Ourouër =

- Part of Vaux d'Amognes
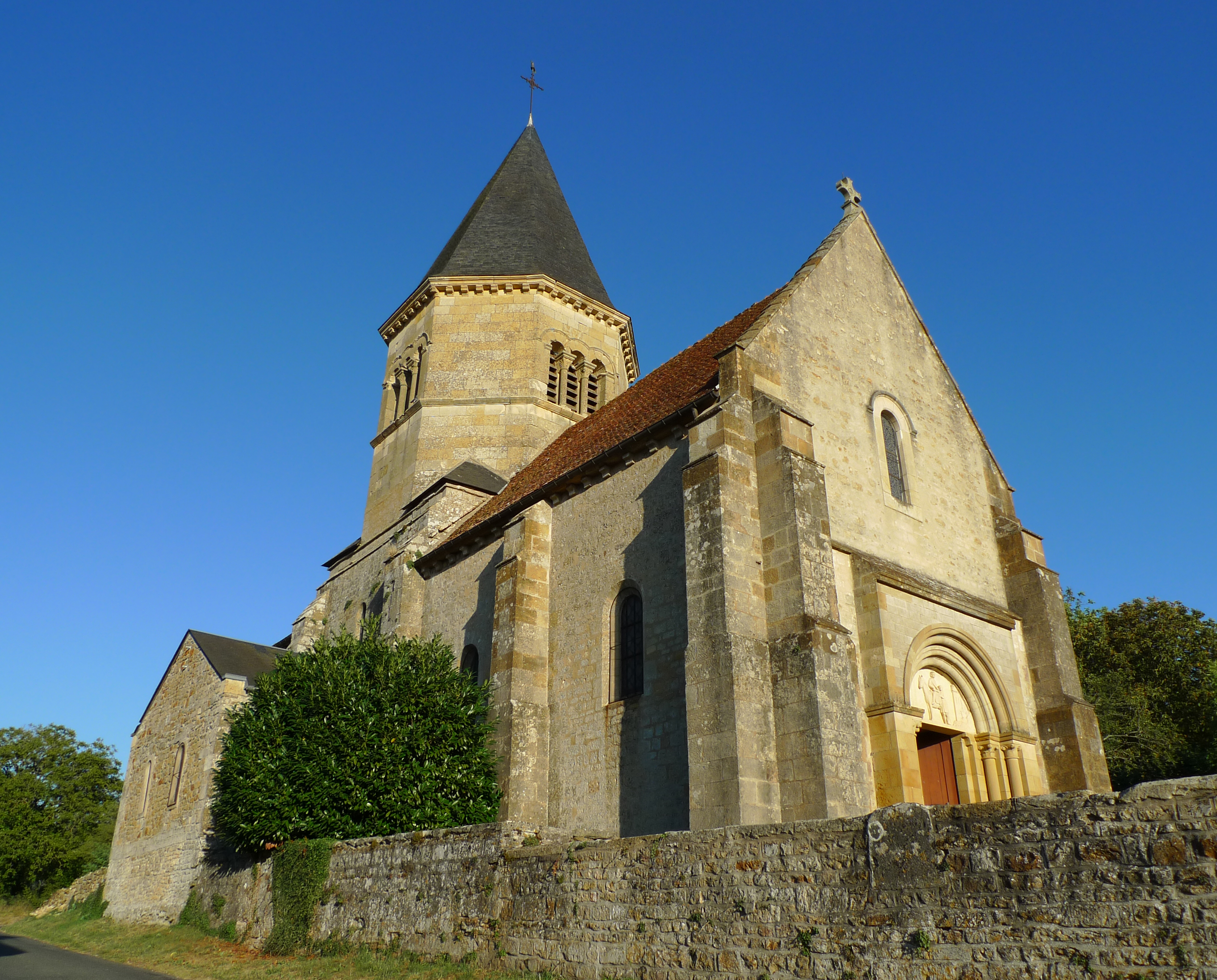
- The church of Saint-Fiacre, in Ourouër
- Location of Ourouër
- Location within France Location within Bourgogne-Franche-Comté
- Coordinates: 47°03′34″N 3°18′24″E
- Country: France
- Region: Bourgogne-Franche-Comté
- Department: Nièvre
- Arrondissement: Nevers
- Canton: Guérigny
- Commune: Vaux d'Amognes
- Area^{1}: 21.76 km^{2} (8.40 sq mi)
- Highest elevation: 383 m (1,257 ft)
- Lowest elevation: 222 m (728 ft)
- Population (2022): 330
  - Density: 15/km^{2} (39/sq mi)
- Time zone: UTC+01:00 (CET)
  - Summer (DST): UTC+02:00 (CEST)
- Postal code: 58130
- ^{1} French Land Register data, which excludes lakes, ponds, glaciers > 1 km^{2} (0.386 sq mi or 247 acres) and river estuaries.

Ourouër is a former commune in the Nièvre department in central France. On 1 January 2017, it was merged into the new commune Vaux d'Amognes. In 2022, the population was 330.

== See also ==
- Communes of the Nièvre department
