= Balleray =

- Part of Vaux d'Amognes
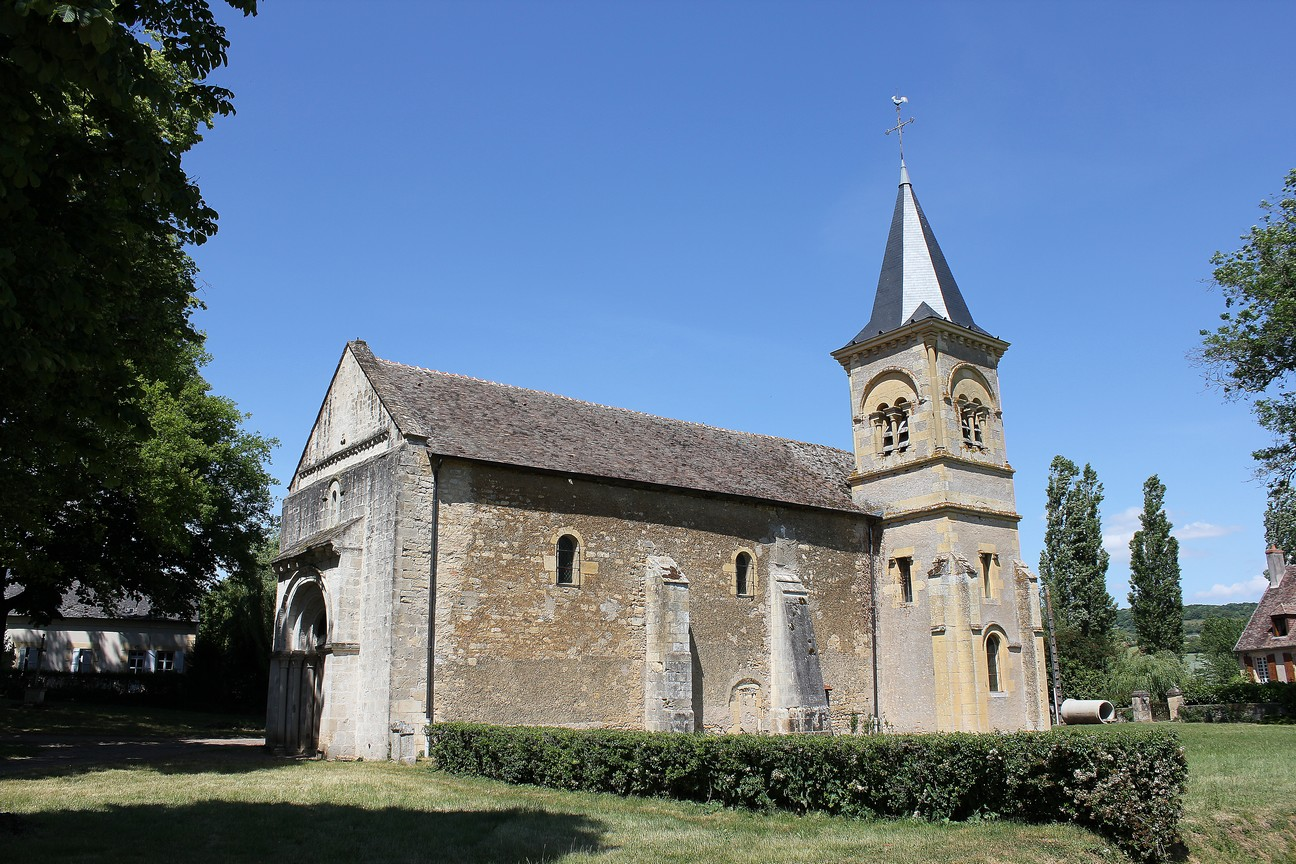
- The church of Saint-Blaise, in Balleray
- Location of Balleray
- Location within France Location within Bourgogne-Franche-Comté
- Coordinates: 47°04′29″N 3°16′46″E
- Country: France
- Region: Bourgogne-Franche-Comté
- Department: Nièvre
- Arrondissement: Nevers
- Canton: Guérigny
- Commune: Vaux d'Amognes
- Area^{1}: 16.08 km^{2} (6.21 sq mi)
- Highest elevation: 375 m (1,230 ft)
- Lowest elevation: 208 m (682 ft)
- Population (2023): 204
  - Density: 12.7/km^{2} (32.9/sq mi)
- Time zone: UTC+01:00 (CET)
  - Summer (DST): UTC+02:00 (CEST)
- Postal code: 58130
- ^{1} French Land Register data, which excludes lakes, ponds, glaciers > 1 km^{2} (0.386 sq mi or 247 acres) and river estuaries.

Balleray (French pronunciation: [balʁɛ]) is a former commune in the Nièvre department in central France. On 1 January 2017, it was merged into the new commune Vaux d'Amognes.

== See also ==
- Communes of the Nièvre department
