= Saint Benin =

Saint Benin may refer to:

- Saint-Benin
- Saint-Benin-d'Azy
- Saint-Benin-des-Bois
- Saint Benignus of Armagh, also spelled "Saint Benin"
