= Reugny =

Reugny may refer to the following places in France:

- Frasnay-Reugny, a commune in the department of Nièvre
- Reugny, Allier, a commune in the department of Allier
- Reugny, Indre-et-Loire, a commune in the department of Indre-et-Loire
- Reugny Chapel of Laféline, France (portal now in New York's Cloisters Museum)
