= Imbert de La Platière =

French army officer

Imbert de la Platière
- Seigneur de Bourdillon
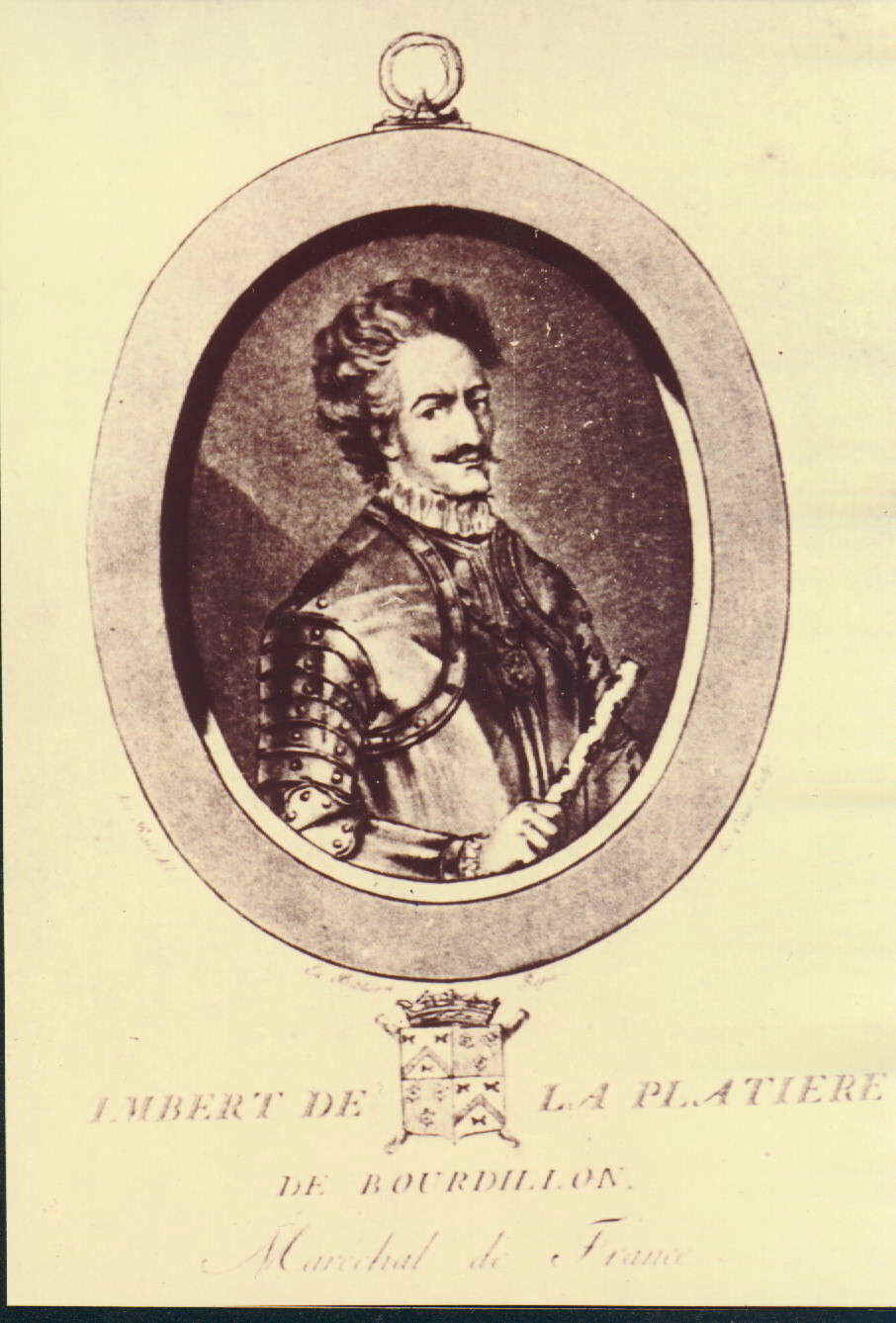
- Other titles: Marshal of France, Seigneur de Frasnay, Montigny-lès-Cherlieu, Saint-Sulpice
- Born: January 1516
- Died: 4 April 1567 (aged 51); Fontainbleau, Kingdom of France
- Family: Famille de La Platière
- Father: Philippe de La Platière
- Mother: Catherine de La Fayette

Imbert de La Platière, lord of Bourdillon (1516–1567), was a French army officer and Marshal of France. He began his career under Francis I, fighting at the famous victory of Ceresole in 1544. During the reign of Henri II he continued to receive career advancements, becoming Lieutenant general first of Champagne and Brie in 1553, and then the important border fortresses in the Piedmont in 1559. Having fought for the crown during the Italian Wars he continued to serve loyally as the French Wars of Religion began, becoming a Marshal in December 1562 on the death of Paul de Thermes, aiding in the enforcement of the Peace of Amboise after the first religious war, and being sent to crush the nascent religious leagues in 1565. He died in 1567, shortly before the civil wars resumed.

== Early life and family ==
A member of the Platière family, native of the region Nivernais, Imbert de la Platière, Lord of Bourdillon, Frasnay, Montigny-lès-Cherlieu, Saint-Sulpice, Saint-Aubin and Époisses, was born in 1516. He was the son of Philippe de la Platière, lord of the Bordes, maître d' hôtel of the king who was made captain of city Niort in 1520 before dying a few years later in 1525 and Catherine de La Fayette who died in 1529. He was also the nephew of Imbert de la Platière (d. 1519), Bishop of Nevers. He remained tied with Nevers his career advancing as a protégé of the Duke of Nevers.

He married first Claude de Damas who was the widow of Gerarde de la Magdelaine, she would however die in 1558, and he would remarry, to Françoise de Birague daughter of René de Birague who became Chancellor of France in 1573. He had no children with either wife, and his niece Françoise de la Platière became his heiress upon his death.

== Reign of Francis I ==
He participated in King Francis I of France's military campaigns in Champagne and Italy, including the famous Battle of Ceresole in 1544. In the wake of the battle, he was made bailli of Auxois in 1545.

During this time he was in the service of the duke of Nevers, lieutenant of a company of his soldiers, and captain of 50 gentlemen of an ordinance company.

== Reign of Henri II ==
Upon the ascension of the new king he was granted the title of Maréchal de camp in 1552, Lieutenant general in charge of the gouvernment of Champagne and Brie in 1553. In 1554 he fought the Spanish around Mezieres clearing them from the area. In 1557 France was stunned by the crushing defeat dealt to the army at the battle of Saint-Quentin, Bourdillon successfully extracted the remnants of the army from the field, preventing a larger disaster. He fought at the relief of Thionville in 1558. By the terms of the Peace of Cateau-Cambrésis Italy was largely evacuated by the French. However, several fortresses were maintained in the Piedmont, placed under the authority of Bourdillon as Lieutenant General of Piedmont and governor of the Marquisate of Saluzzo. In this role his responsibility for civilians was highly limited, and his command was focused around a large mercenary contingent.

== Reign of Charles IX ==
Receiving increasingly disagreeable instructions from court as the crowns toleration policy became more fully formed, Bourdillon took the opportunity to stall, delaying carrying out royal instructions for months on the grounds that it was not possible to enforce the orders of a king who was a minor. With the outbreak of civil war the situation changed, and on 22 December 1562, he was called to court, receiving Paul de Thermes' Marshal baton upon the late Marshal's death from the regent Catherine de'Medici. Having received the honour he returned to his lieutenant general responsibilities. With peace declared in 1563, the Edict of Amboise required enforcing. To facilitate this commissioners were sent out into the provinces, to resolve disputes over the edicts terms and create compromises where necessary. To ensure that the commissioners would be obeyed by local lords, Marshals Bourdillon, Vielleville and Montmorency were assigned super regions to oversee compliance. Bourdillon was given the region of Touraine, Anjou, Maine, Poitou, lower Normandy and parts of Brittany. With the rise of Catholic religious leagues in violation of the edicts terms, Bourdillon was tasked in 1565 with leading an army into the Guyenne, to crush this rebellious movement. When the queen mother met with Alba during the Bayonne Interview in 1565 to discuss potential marriage proposals between the two kingdoms, Bourdillon accompanied her, and was involved in the negotiations.

== Death ==
He died at Fontainebleau on 4 April 1567. He was buried in the church at Époisses which he had acquired from the duke of Nevers in 1561.

== Sources ==
- Adrien Bonvallet, Le château des Bordes et ses seigneurs: Étude Historique, Nevers, 1869.
- Bonvallet, Adrien (1869). Le château des Bordes et ses seigneurs. Fay.
- Thompson, James (1909). The Wars of Religion in France 1559-1576: The Huguenots, Catherine de Medici and Philip II. Chicago University Press.
- Harding, Robert (1978). Anatomy of a Power Elite: the Provincial Governors in Early Modern France. Yale University Press.
- Roberts, Penny (2013). Peace and Authority during the French Religious Wars c.1560-1600. Palgrave Macmillan.
