= Saint-Martin-d'Heuille =

- Commune
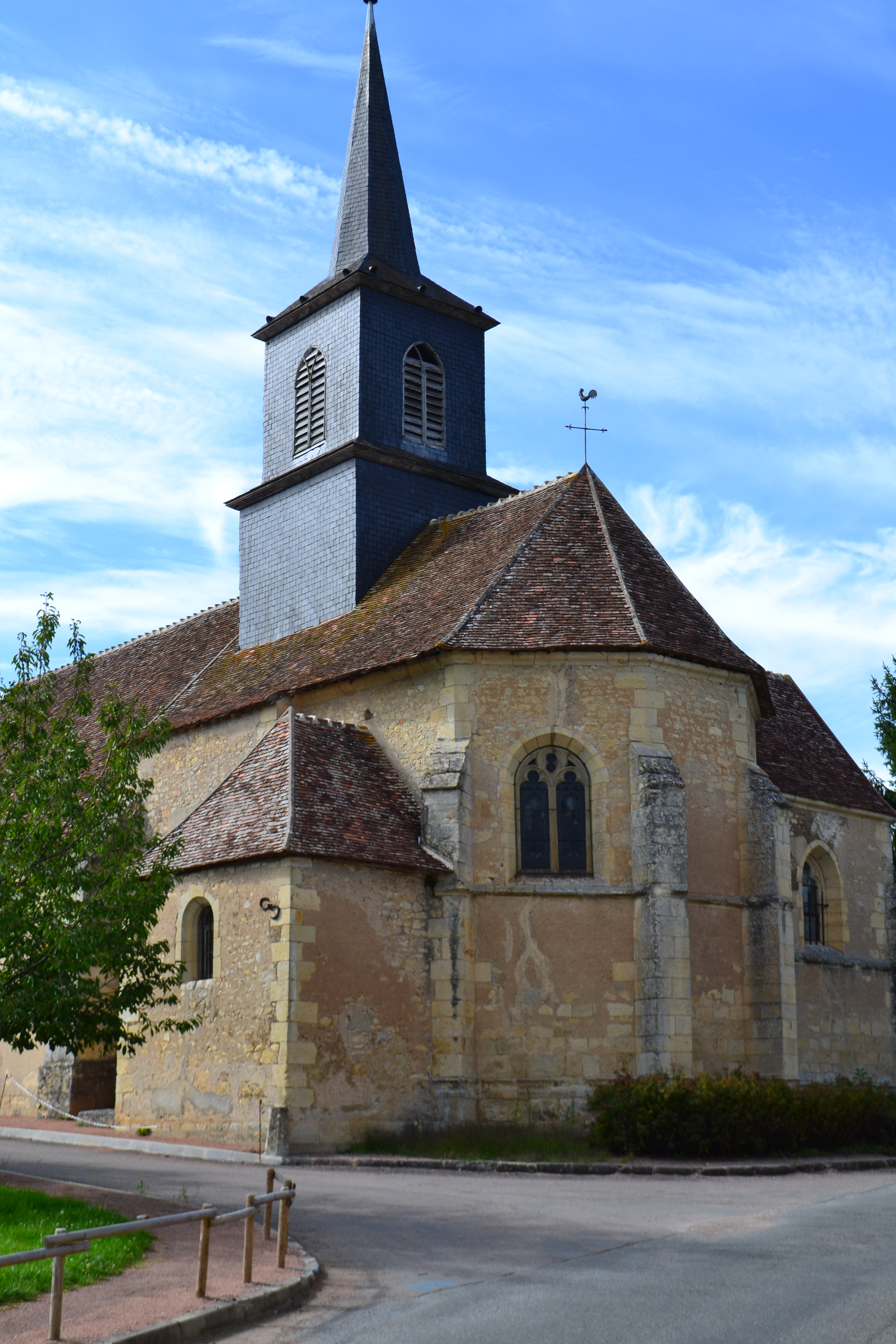
- The church in Saint-Martin-d'Heuille
- Location of Saint-Martin-d'Heuille
- Location within France Location within Bourgogne-Franche-Comté
- Coordinates: 47°03′19″N 3°13′37″E
- Country: France
- Region: Bourgogne-Franche-Comté
- Department: Nièvre
- Arrondissement: Nevers
- Canton: Guérigny

Government
  - Mayor (2020–2026): Rémy Pasquet
- Area^{1}: 13.36 km^{2} (5.16 sq mi)
- Highest elevation: 265 m (869 ft)
- Lowest elevation: 182 m (597 ft)
- Population (2023): 565
  - Density: 42.3/km^{2} (110/sq mi)
- Time zone: UTC+01:00 (CET)
  - Summer (DST): UTC+02:00 (CEST)
- INSEE/Postal code: 58254 /58130
- ^{1} French Land Register data, which excludes lakes, ponds, glaciers > 1 km^{2} (0.386 sq mi or 247 acres) and river estuaries.

Saint-Martin-d'Heuille (French pronunciation: [sɛ̃ maʁtɛ̃ dœj]) is a commune in the Nièvre department in central France.

== See also ==
- Communes of the Nièvre department
