= Fertrève =

- Commune
- Location of Fertrève
- Location within France Location within Bourgogne-Franche-Comté
- Coordinates: 46°58′12″N 3°35′19″E
- Country: France
- Region: Bourgogne-Franche-Comté
- Department: Nièvre
- Arrondissement: Nevers
- Canton: Guérigny

Government
  - Mayor (2021–2026): Patrice Ribet
- Area^{1}: 24.43 km^{2} (9.43 sq mi)
- Highest elevation: 313 m (1,027 ft)
- Lowest elevation: 207 m (679 ft)
- Population (2023): 89
  - Density: 3.6/km^{2} (9.4/sq mi)
- Time zone: UTC+01:00 (CET)
  - Summer (DST): UTC+02:00 (CEST)
- INSEE/Postal code: 58113 /58270
- ^{1} French Land Register data, which excludes lakes, ponds, glaciers > 1 km^{2} (0.386 sq mi or 247 acres) and river estuaries.

Fertrève (French pronunciation: [fɛʁtʁɛv]) is a commune in the Nièvre department in central France.

== Demographics ==
Historical population
Year	Pop.	±% p.a.
1968	174	—
1975	153	−1.82%
1982	125	−2.85%
1990	111	−1.47%
1999	109	−0.20%
2007	118	+1.00%
2012	133	+2.42%
2017	101	−5.36%
2023	89	−2.09%
Source: INSEE

== See also ==
- Communes of the Nièvre department
