= Ville-Langy =

- Commune
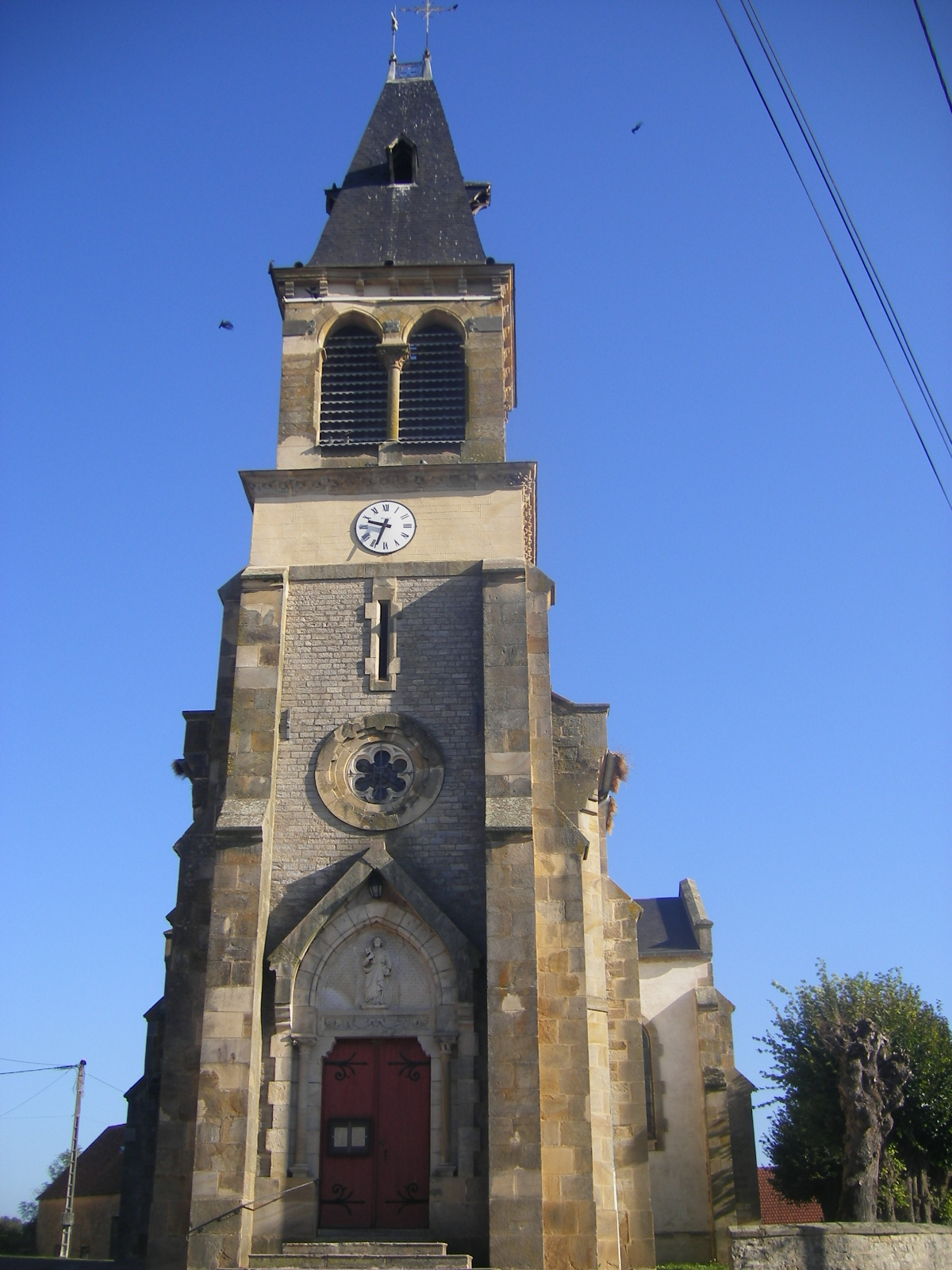
- The church in Ville-Langy
- Location of Ville-Langy
- Location within France Location within Bourgogne-Franche-Comté
- Coordinates: 46°56′40″N 3°30′00″E
- Country: France
- Region: Bourgogne-Franche-Comté
- Department: Nièvre
- Arrondissement: Nevers
- Canton: Guérigny

Government
  - Mayor (2020–2026): Jean Théry
- Area^{1}: 26.86 km^{2} (10.37 sq mi)
- Highest elevation: 286 m (938 ft)
- Lowest elevation: 203 m (666 ft)
- Population (2023): 236
  - Density: 8.79/km^{2} (22.8/sq mi)
- Time zone: UTC+01:00 (CET)
  - Summer (DST): UTC+02:00 (CEST)
- INSEE/Postal code: 58311 /58270
- ^{1} French Land Register data, which excludes lakes, ponds, glaciers > 1 km^{2} (0.386 sq mi or 247 acres) and river estuaries.

Ville-Langy is a commune in Nièvre, a department in central France.

== Demographics ==
Historical population
Year	Pop.	±% p.a.
1968	377	—
1975	314	−2.58%
1982	308	−0.28%
1990	308	+0.00%
1999	299	−0.33%
2007	287	−0.51%
2012	295	+0.55%
2017	252	−3.10%
2023	236	−1.09%
Source: INSEE

== See also ==
- Communes of the Nièvre department
