= Saxi-Bourdon =

- Commune
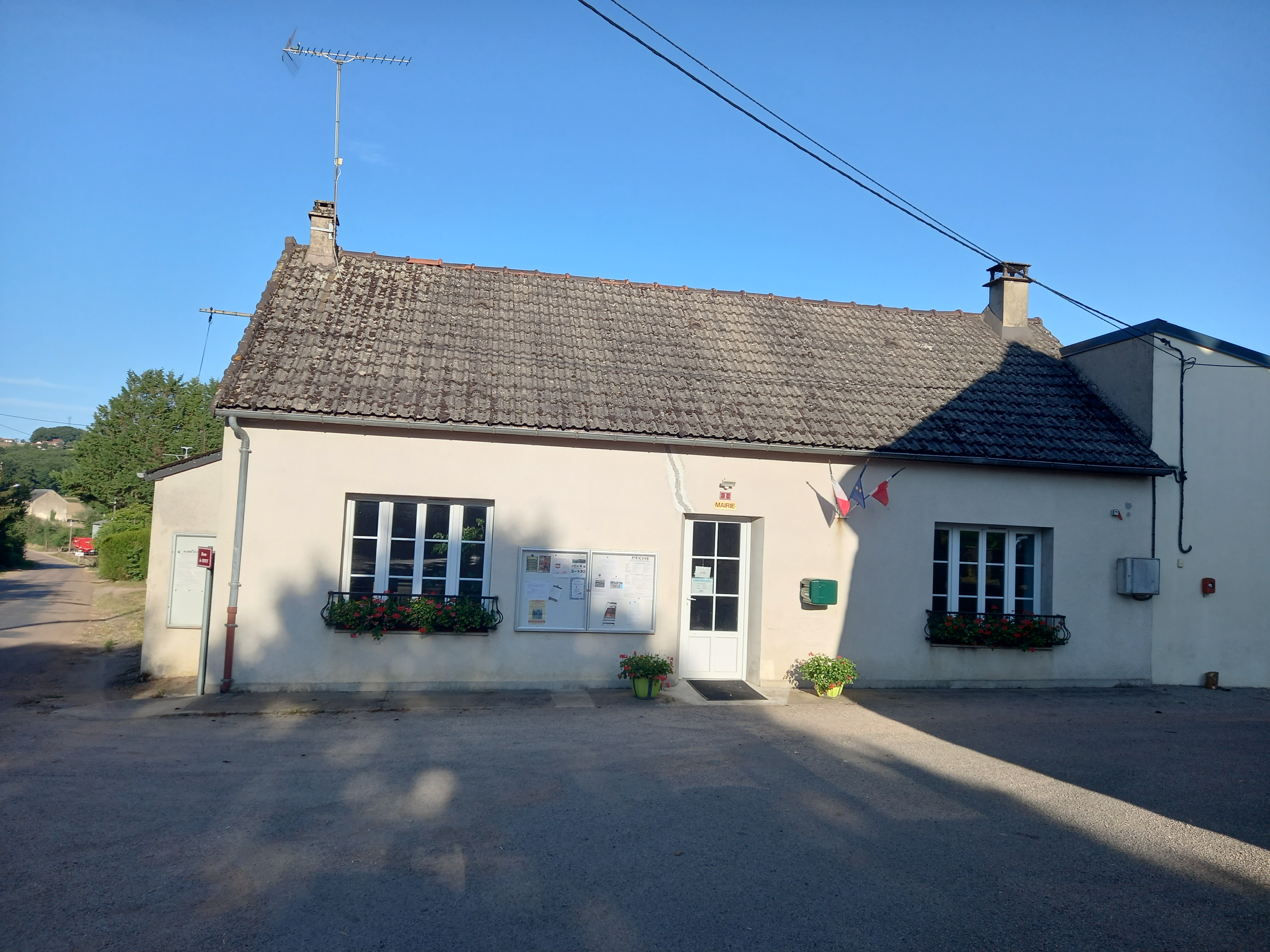
- Town hall
- Location of Saxi-Bourdon
- Location within France Location within Bourgogne-Franche-Comté
- Coordinates: 47°03′32″N 3°29′21″E
- Country: France
- Region: Bourgogne-Franche-Comté
- Department: Nièvre
- Arrondissement: Nevers
- Canton: Guérigny

Government
  - Mayor (2020–2026): Jean-Louis Commaille
- Area^{1}: 18.44 km^{2} (7.12 sq mi)
- Highest elevation: 357 m (1,171 ft)
- Lowest elevation: 248 m (814 ft)
- Population (2023): 267
  - Density: 14.5/km^{2} (37.5/sq mi)
- Time zone: UTC+01:00 (CET)
  - Summer (DST): UTC+02:00 (CEST)
- INSEE/Postal code: 58275 /58330
- ^{1} French Land Register data, which excludes lakes, ponds, glaciers > 1 km^{2} (0.386 sq mi or 247 acres) and river estuaries.

Saxi-Bourdon is a commune in the Nièvre department in central France.

== See also ==
- Communes of the Nièvre department
