= Vaux d'Amognes =

- Commune
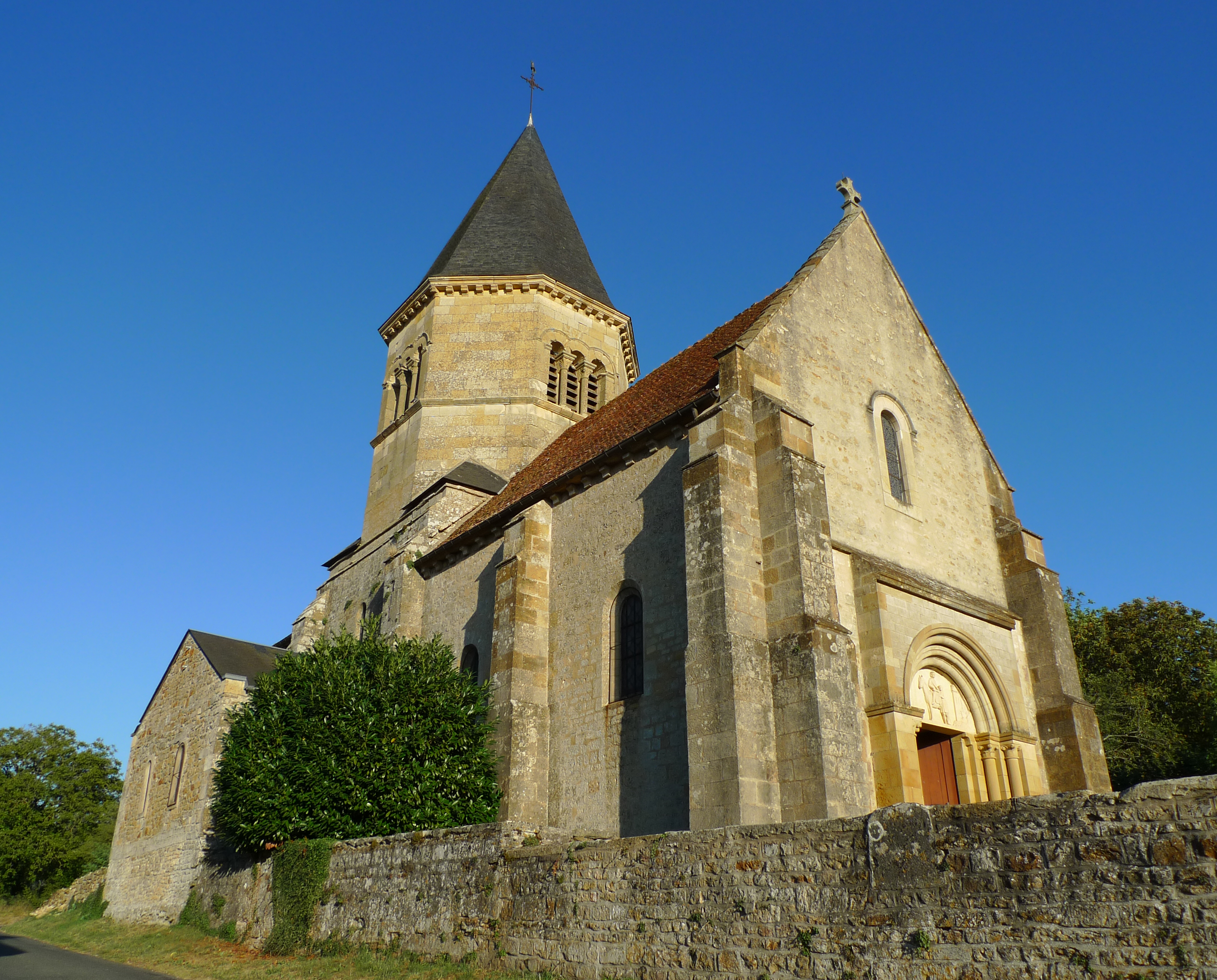
- The church of Saint-Fiacre of Ourouër
- Location of Vaux d'Amognes
- Location within France Location within Bourgogne-Franche-Comté
- Coordinates: 47°03′32″N 3°18′25″E
- Country: France
- Region: Bourgogne-Franche-Comté
- Department: Nièvre
- Arrondissement: Nevers
- Canton: Guérigny
- Intercommunality: Amognes Cœur du Nivernais

Government
  - Mayor (2020–2026): Gilles Michon
- Area^{1}: 37.84 km^{2} (14.61 sq mi)
- Population (2023): 539
  - Density: 14.2/km^{2} (36.9/sq mi)
- Time zone: UTC+01:00 (CET)
  - Summer (DST): UTC+02:00 (CEST)
- INSEE/Postal code: 58204 /58130
- ^{1} French Land Register data, which excludes lakes, ponds, glaciers > 1 km^{2} (0.386 sq mi or 247 acres) and river estuaries.

Vaux d'Amognes (French pronunciation: [vo damɔɲ]) is a commune in the department of Nièvre, central France. The municipality was established on 1 January 2017 by the merger of the former communes of Ourouër (the seat) and Balleray.

== See also ==
- Communes of the Nièvre department
