= Urzy =

- Commune
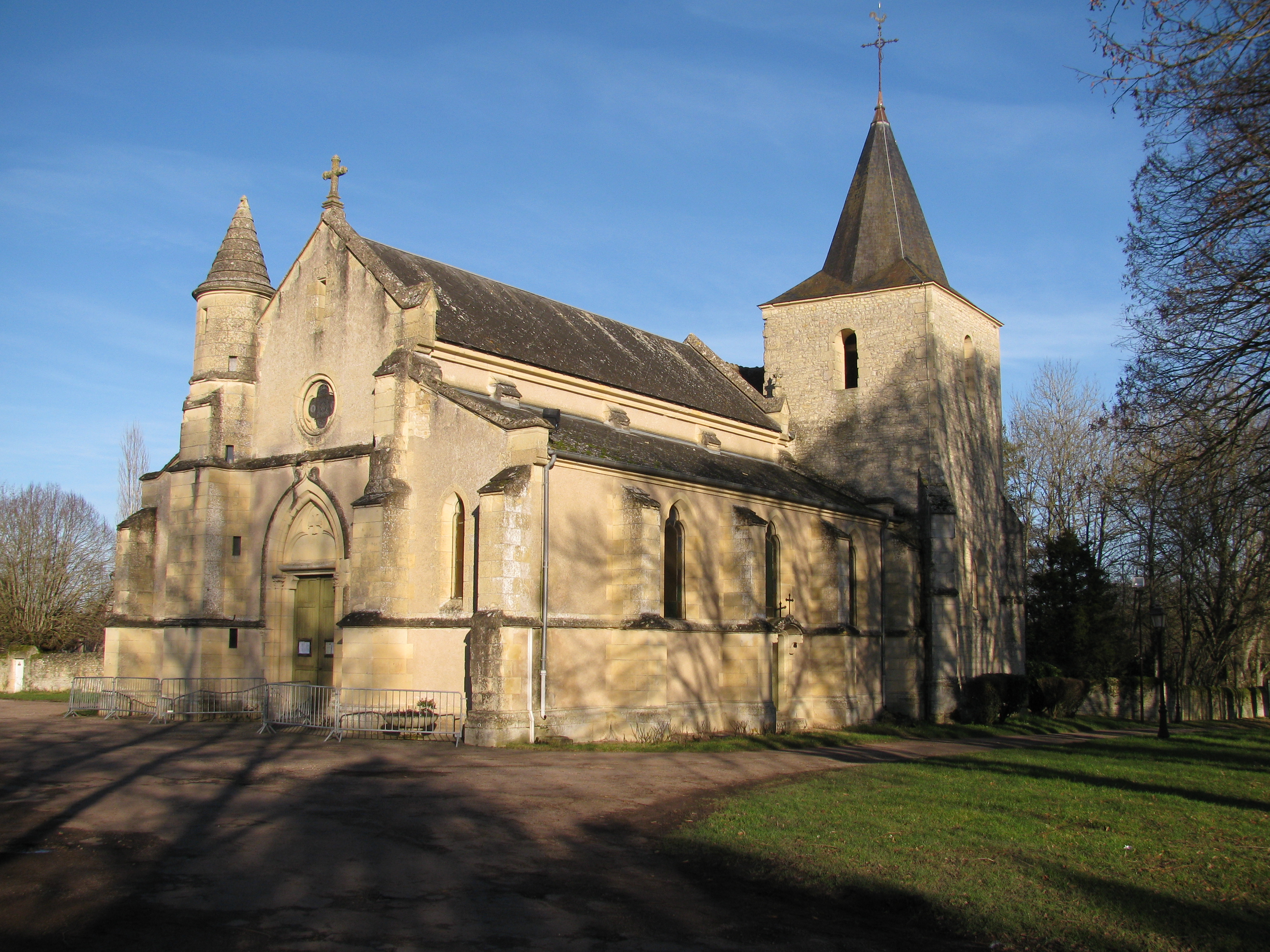
- The church in Urzy
- Location of Urzy
- Location within France Location within Bourgogne-Franche-Comté
- Coordinates: 47°03′45″N 3°12′19″E
- Country: France
- Region: Bourgogne-Franche-Comté
- Department: Nièvre
- Arrondissement: Nevers
- Canton: Guérigny
- Intercommunality: Les Bertranges

Government
  - Mayor (2020–2026): Gilles Devienne
- Area^{1}: 23.41 km^{2} (9.04 sq mi)
- Highest elevation: 275 m (902 ft)
- Lowest elevation: 182 m (597 ft)
- Population (2023): 1,727
  - Density: 73.77/km^{2} (191.1/sq mi)
- Time zone: UTC+01:00 (CET)
  - Summer (DST): UTC+02:00 (CEST)
- INSEE/Postal code: 58300 /58130
- ^{1} French Land Register data, which excludes lakes, ponds, glaciers > 1 km^{2} (0.386 sq mi or 247 acres) and river estuaries.

Urzy (French pronunciation: [yʁzi]) is a commune in the Nièvre department in central France.

== See also ==
- Communes of the Nièvre department
