= Saint-Firmin, Nièvre =

Saint-Firmin
- Commune
- Location of Saint-Firmin
- Location within France Location within Bourgogne-Franche-Comté
- Coordinates: 47°02′39″N 3°23′33″E
- Country: France
- Region: Bourgogne-Franche-Comté
- Department: Nièvre
- Arrondissement: Nevers
- Canton: Guérigny

Government
  - Mayor (2020–2026): Marie-Christine Amiot
- Area^{1}: 10.40 km^{2} (4.02 sq mi)
- Highest elevation: 354 m (1,161 ft)
- Lowest elevation: 235 m (771 ft)
- Population (2023): 152
  - Density: 14.6/km^{2} (37.9/sq mi)
- Time zone: UTC+01:00 (CET)
  - Summer (DST): UTC+02:00 (CEST)
- INSEE/Postal code: 58239 /58270
- ^{1} French Land Register data, which excludes lakes, ponds, glaciers > 1 km^{2} (0.386 sq mi or 247 acres) and river estuaries.

Saint-Firmin (French pronunciation: [sɛ̃ fiʁmɛ̃]) is a commune in the Nièvre department in central France.

== Demographics ==
Historical population
Year	Pop.	±% p.a.
1968	158	—
1975	124	−3.40%
1982	117	−0.83%
1990	116	−0.11%
1999	134	+1.62%
2007	152	+1.59%
2012	162	+1.28%
2017	175	+1.56%
2023	152	−2.32%
Source: INSEE

== See also ==
- Communes of the Nièvre department
