= Billy-Chevannes =

- Commune
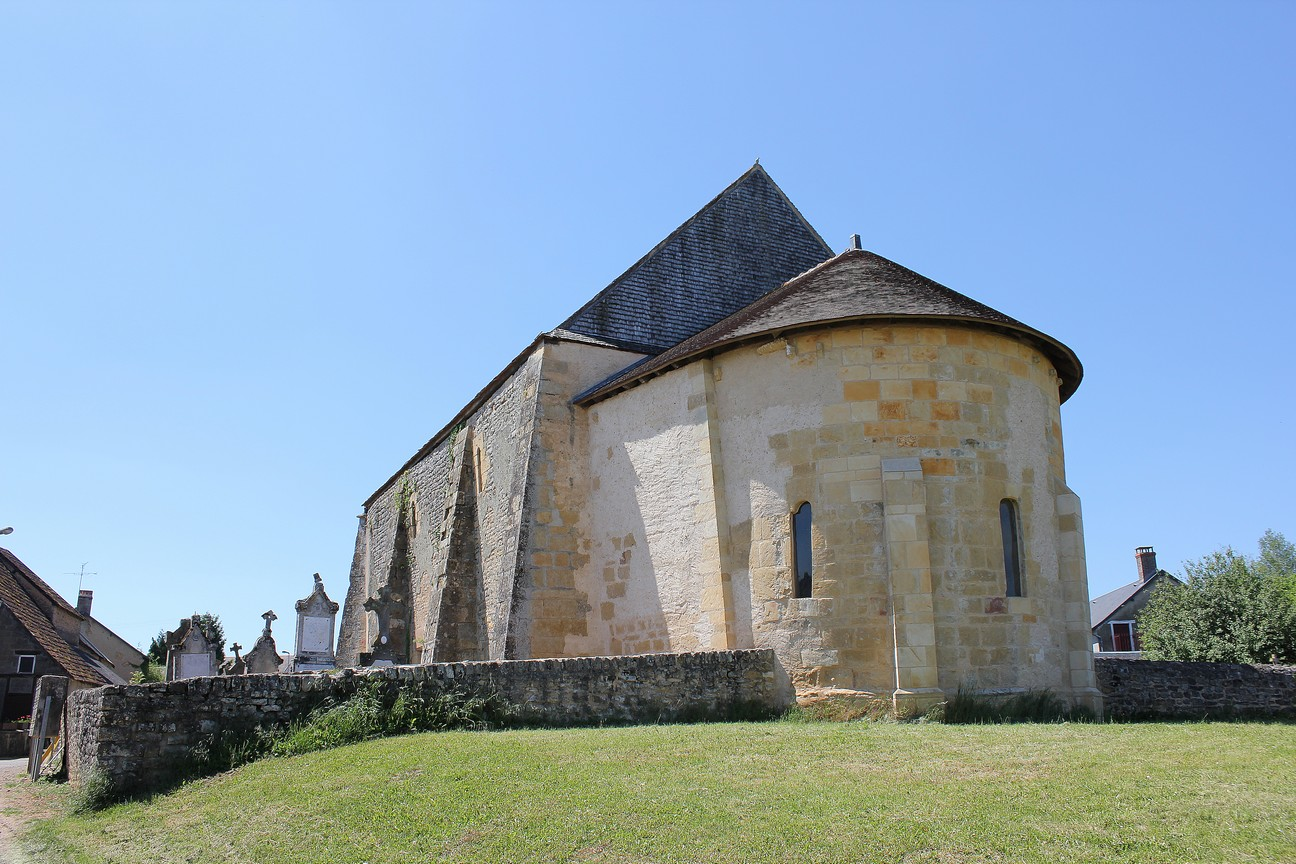
- The church of Saint-Antoine, in Billy-Chevannes
- Location of Billy-Chevannes
- Location within France Location within Bourgogne-Franche-Comté
- Coordinates: 47°00′55″N 3°27′17″E
- Country: France
- Region: Bourgogne-Franche-Comté
- Department: Nièvre
- Arrondissement: Nevers
- Canton: Guérigny
- Intercommunality: Amognes Cœur du Nivernais

Government
  - Mayor (2020–2026): Alain Vallet
- Area^{1}: 23.76 km^{2} (9.17 sq mi)
- Highest elevation: 428 m (1,404 ft)
- Lowest elevation: 234 m (768 ft)
- Population (2023): 326
  - Density: 13.7/km^{2} (35.5/sq mi)
- Time zone: UTC+01:00 (CET)
  - Summer (DST): UTC+02:00 (CEST)
- INSEE/Postal code: 58031 /58270
- ^{1} French Land Register data, which excludes lakes, ponds, glaciers > 1 km^{2} (0.386 sq mi or 247 acres) and river estuaries.

Billy-Chevannes (French pronunciation: [biji ʃəvan]) is a commune in the Nièvre department in central France.

== Population ==
Historical population
Year	Pop.	±% p.a.
1968	369	—
1975	361	−0.31%
1982	288	−3.18%
1990	271	−0.76%
1999	276	+0.20%
2007	350	+3.01%
2012	353	+0.17%
2017	308	−2.69%
2023	326	+0.95%
Source: INSEE

== See also ==
- Communes of the Nièvre department
