= Sainte-Marie, Nièvre =

Sainte-Marie
- Commune
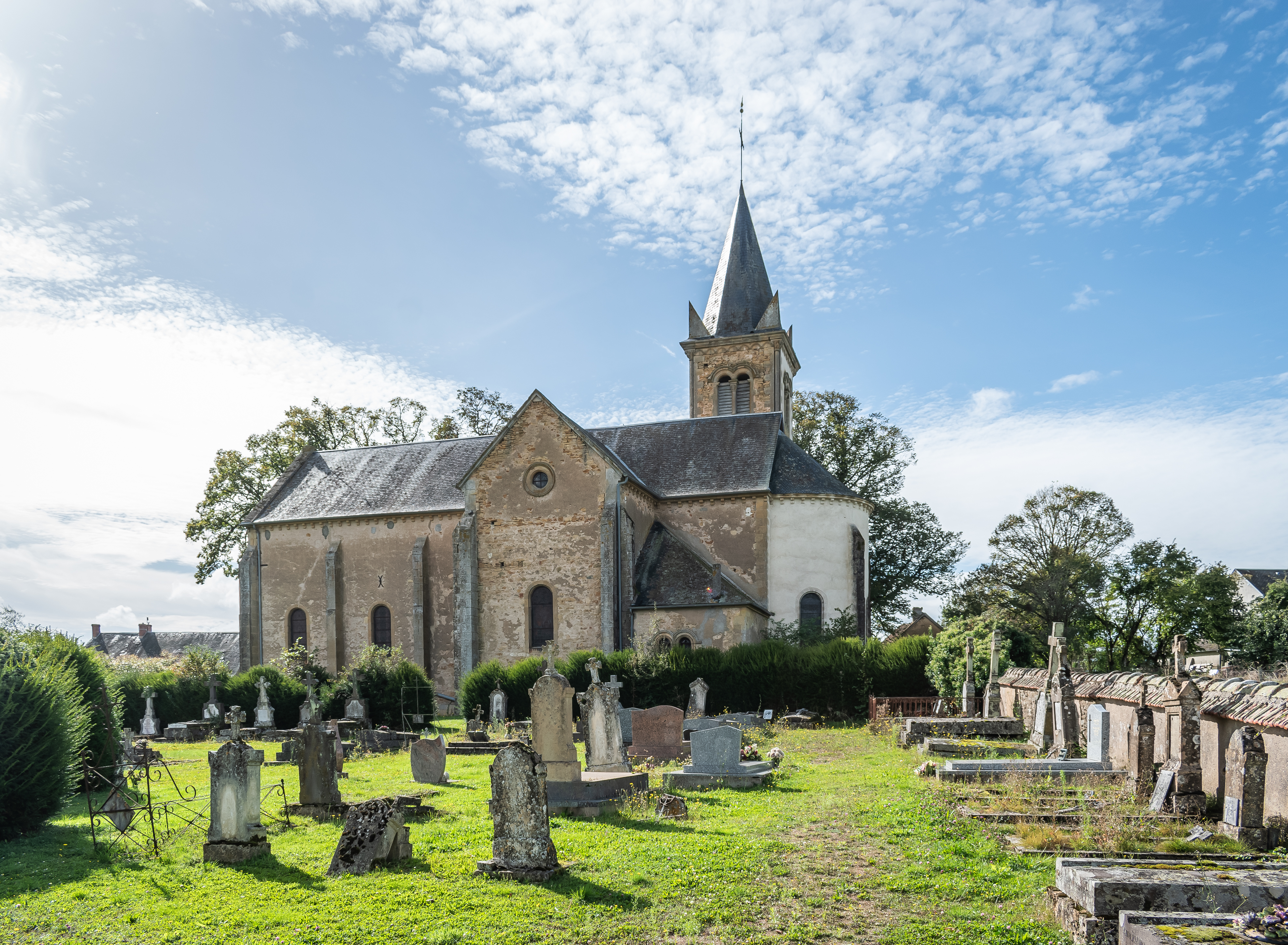
- The church in Sainte-Marie
- Location of Sainte-Marie
- Location within France Location within Bourgogne-Franche-Comté
- Coordinates: 47°07′07″N 3°26′18″E
- Country: France
- Region: Bourgogne-Franche-Comté
- Department: Nièvre
- Arrondissement: Nevers
- Canton: Guérigny
- Intercommunality: Amognes Cœur du Nivernais

Government
  - Mayor (2020–2026): Corinne Bouchard
- Area^{1}: 15.64 km^{2} (6.04 sq mi)
- Highest elevation: 421 m (1,381 ft)
- Lowest elevation: 255 m (837 ft)
- Population (2023): 87
  - Density: 5.6/km^{2} (14/sq mi)
- Time zone: UTC+01:00 (CET)
  - Summer (DST): UTC+02:00 (CEST)
- INSEE/Postal code: 58253 /58330
- ^{1} French Land Register data, which excludes lakes, ponds, glaciers > 1 km^{2} (0.386 sq mi or 247 acres) and river estuaries.

Sainte-Marie (French pronunciation: [sɛ̃t maʁi]) is a commune in the Nièvre department in central France.

== See also ==
- Communes of the Nièvre department
