= Saint-Maurice, Nièvre =

Saint-Maurice
- Commune
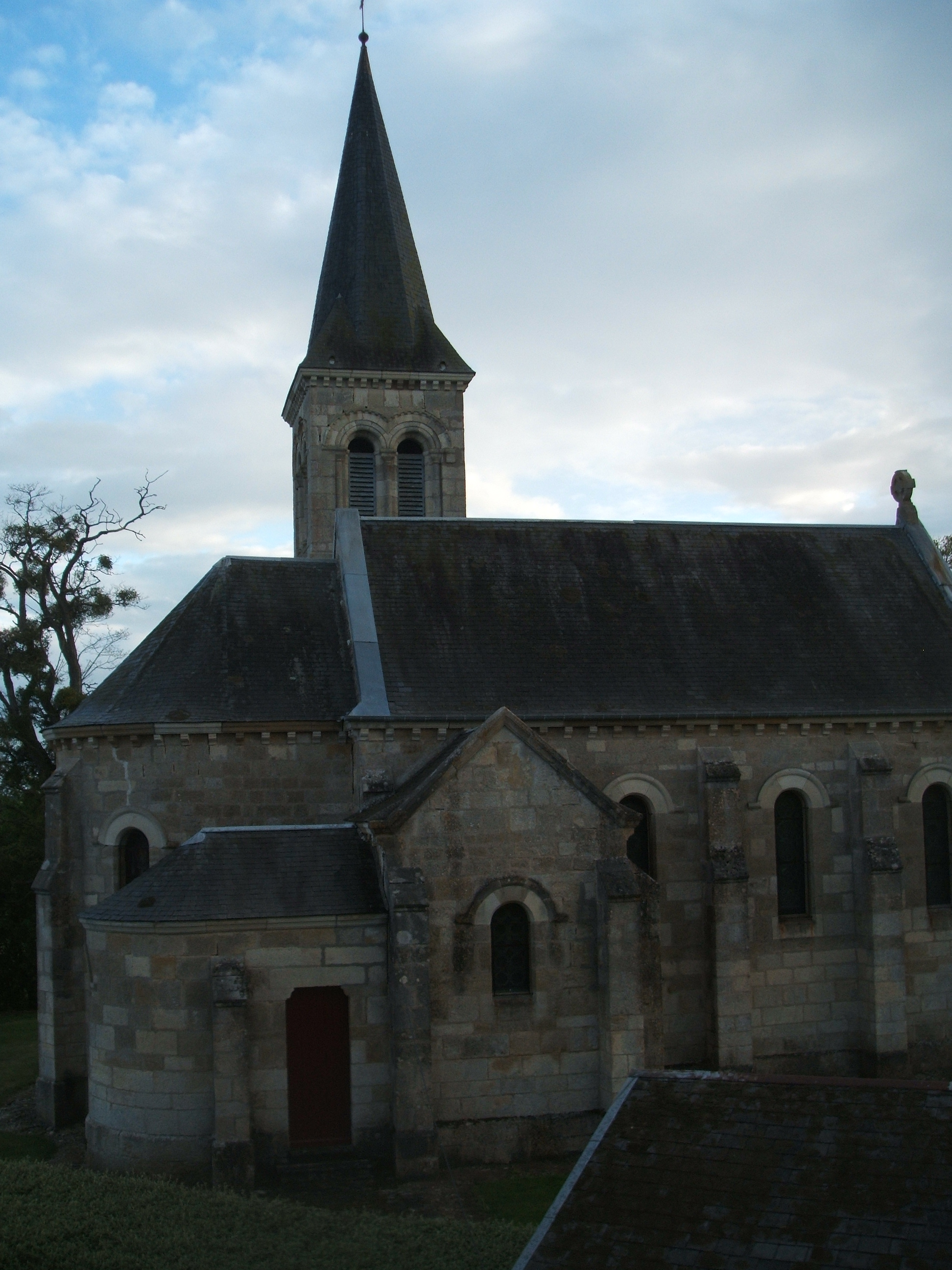
- The church in Saint-Maurice
- Location of Saint-Maurice
- Location within France Location within Bourgogne-Franche-Comté
- Coordinates: 47°06′26″N 3°34′11″E
- Country: France
- Region: Bourgogne-Franche-Comté
- Department: Nièvre
- Arrondissement: Nevers
- Canton: Guérigny
- Intercommunality: Amognes Cœur du Nivernais

Government
  - Mayor (2020–2026): Philippe Grand-Clément
- Area^{1}: 10.39 km^{2} (4.01 sq mi)
- Highest elevation: 299 m (981 ft)
- Lowest elevation: 238 m (781 ft)
- Population (2023): 48
  - Density: 4.6/km^{2} (12/sq mi)
- Time zone: UTC+01:00 (CET)
  - Summer (DST): UTC+02:00 (CEST)
- INSEE/Postal code: 58257 /58330
- ^{1} French Land Register data, which excludes lakes, ponds, glaciers > 1 km^{2} (0.386 sq mi or 247 acres) and river estuaries.

Saint-Maurice (French pronunciation: [sɛ̃ mɔʁis]) is a commune in the Nièvre department in central France.

== See also ==
- Communes of the Nièvre department
