= Rouy, Nièvre =

Rouy
- Commune
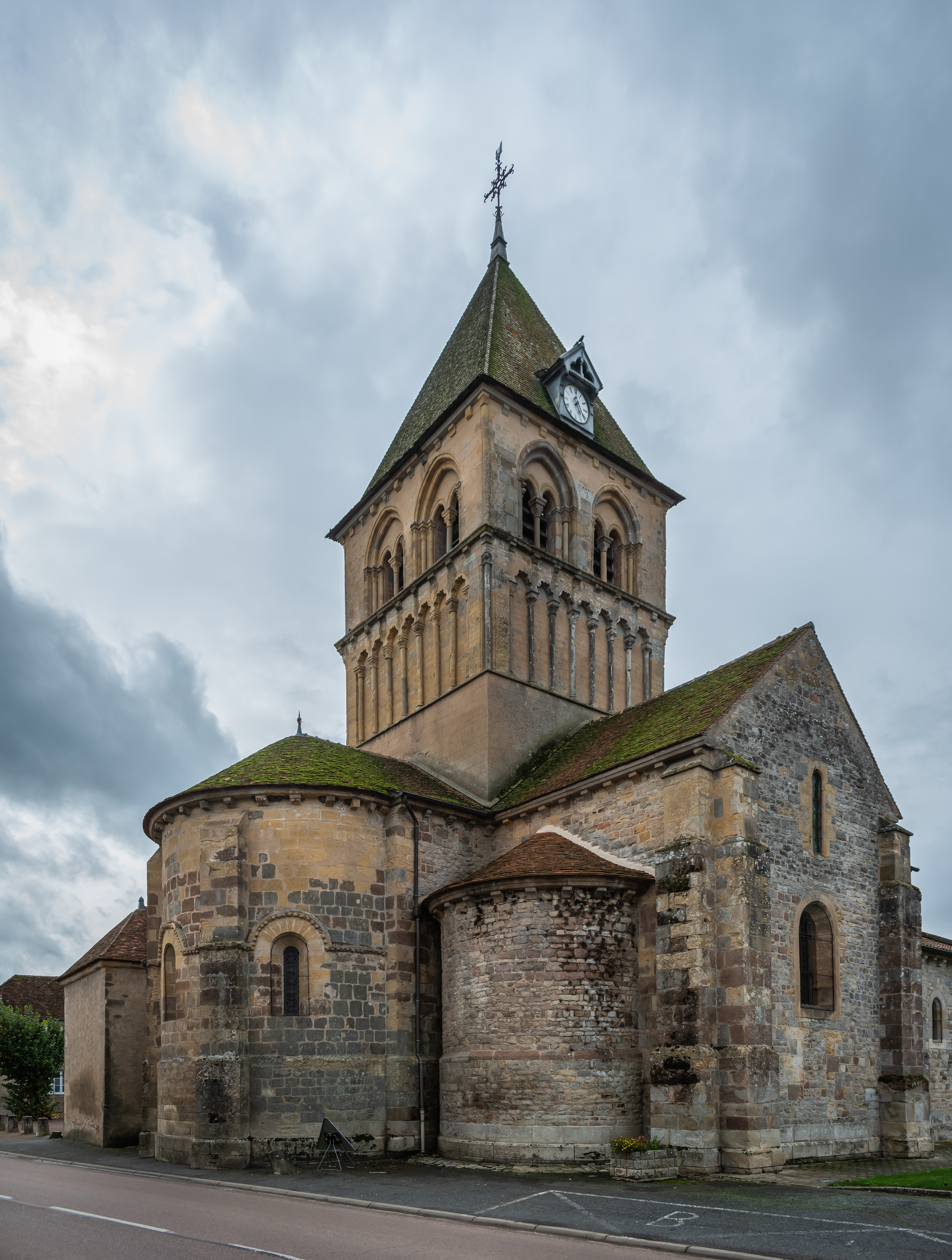
- The church in Rouy
- Location of Rouy
- Location within France Location within Bourgogne-Franche-Comté
- Coordinates: 47°01′34″N 3°32′04″E
- Country: France
- Region: Bourgogne-Franche-Comté
- Department: Nièvre
- Arrondissement: Nevers
- Canton: Guérigny

Government
  - Mayor (2020–2026): Thierry Gauthier
- Area^{1}: 35.88 km^{2} (13.85 sq mi)
- Highest elevation: 336 m (1,102 ft)
- Lowest elevation: 229 m (751 ft)
- Population (2023): 628
  - Density: 17.5/km^{2} (45.3/sq mi)
- Time zone: UTC+01:00 (CET)
  - Summer (DST): UTC+02:00 (CEST)
- INSEE/Postal code: 58223 /58110
- ^{1} French Land Register data, which excludes lakes, ponds, glaciers > 1 km^{2} (0.386 sq mi or 247 acres) and river estuaries.

Rouy (French pronunciation: [ʁwi]) is a commune in the Nièvre department in central France.

== See also ==
- Communes of the Nièvre department
