= Bona, Nièvre =

Bona
- Commune
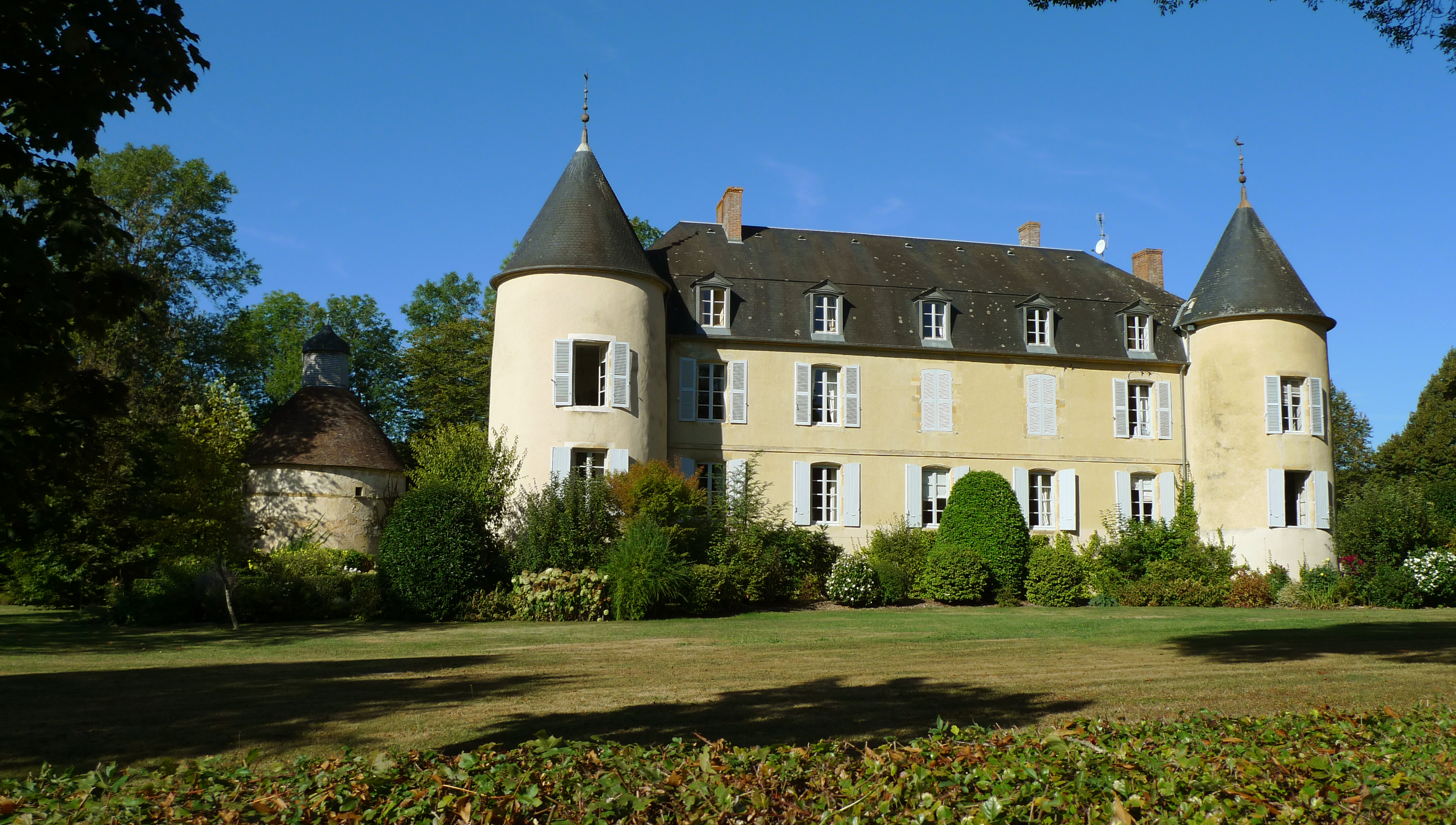
- The Château de Lichy, in Bona
- Location of Bona
- Location within France Location within Bourgogne-Franche-Comté
- Coordinates: 47°03′43″N 3°25′27″E
- Country: France
- Region: Bourgogne-Franche-Comté
- Department: Nièvre
- Arrondissement: Nevers
- Canton: Guérigny

Government
  - Mayor (2020–2026): Marc Gauthier
- Area^{1}: 23.24 km^{2} (8.97 sq mi)
- Highest elevation: 441 m (1,447 ft)
- Lowest elevation: 257 m (843 ft)
- Population (2023): 296
  - Density: 12.7/km^{2} (33.0/sq mi)
- Time zone: UTC+01:00 (CET)
  - Summer (DST): UTC+02:00 (CEST)
- INSEE/Postal code: 58035 /58330
- ^{1} French Land Register data, which excludes lakes, ponds, glaciers > 1 km^{2} (0.386 sq mi or 247 acres) and river estuaries.

Bona (French pronunciation: [bɔna]) is a commune in the Nièvre department in central France.

== Population ==
Historical population
Year	Pop.	±% p.a.
1968	369	—
1975	302	−2.82%
1982	291	−0.53%
1990	336	+1.81%
1999	325	−0.37%
2007	329	+0.15%
2012	301	−1.76%
2017	313	+0.78%
2023	296	−0.93%
Source: INSEE

== See also ==
- Communes of the Nièvre department
