= Limon, Nièvre =

Limon
- Commune
- Location of Limon
- Location within France Location within Bourgogne-Franche-Comté
- Coordinates: 46°58′11″N 3°22′48″E
- Country: France
- Region: Bourgogne-Franche-Comté
- Department: Nièvre
- Arrondissement: Nevers
- Canton: Guérigny

Government
  - Mayor (2020–2026): Didier Ramet
- Area^{1}: 8.04 km^{2} (3.10 sq mi)
- Highest elevation: 352 m (1,155 ft)
- Lowest elevation: 203 m (666 ft)
- Population (2023): 151
  - Density: 18.8/km^{2} (48.6/sq mi)
- Time zone: UTC+01:00 (CET)
  - Summer (DST): UTC+02:00 (CEST)
- INSEE/Postal code: 58143 /58270
- ^{1} French Land Register data, which excludes lakes, ponds, glaciers > 1 km^{2} (0.386 sq mi or 247 acres) and river estuaries.

Limon (French pronunciation: [limɔ̃]) is a commune in the Nièvre department in central France.

== See also ==
- Communes of the Nièvre department
