= Saint-Saulge =

- Commune
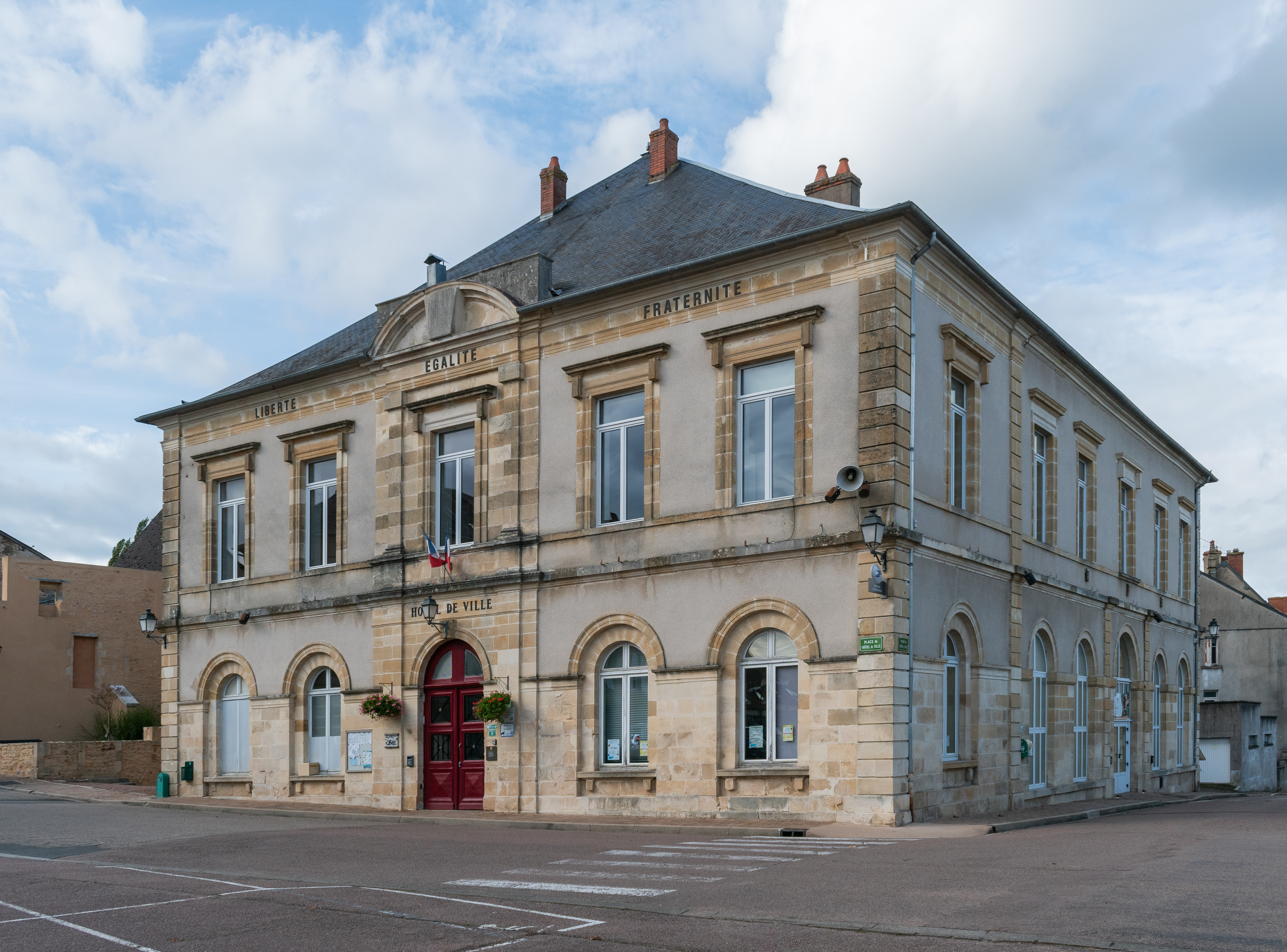
- The town hall in Saint-Saulge
- Location of Saint-Saulge
- Location within France Location within Bourgogne-Franche-Comté
- Coordinates: 47°06′20″N 3°30′48″E
- Country: France
- Region: Bourgogne-Franche-Comté
- Department: Nièvre
- Arrondissement: Nevers
- Canton: Guérigny

Government
  - Mayor (2020–2026): Christian Gentil
- Area^{1}: 25.77 km^{2} (9.95 sq mi)
- Highest elevation: 403 m (1,322 ft)
- Lowest elevation: 245 m (804 ft)
- Population (2023): 650
  - Density: 25/km^{2} (65/sq mi)
- Time zone: UTC+01:00 (CET)
  - Summer (DST): UTC+02:00 (CEST)
- INSEE/Postal code: 58267 /58330
- ^{1} French Land Register data, which excludes lakes, ponds, glaciers > 1 km^{2} (0.386 sq mi or 247 acres) and river estuaries.

Saint-Saulge (French pronunciation: [sɛ̃ soʒ]) is a commune in the Nièvre department in central France.

== See also ==
- Communes of the Nièvre department
