= Saint-Jean-aux-Amognes =

- Commune
- Location of Saint-Jean-aux-Amognes
- Location within France Location within Bourgogne-Franche-Comté
- Coordinates: 47°00′58″N 3°20′08″E
- Country: France
- Region: Bourgogne-Franche-Comté
- Department: Nièvre
- Arrondissement: Nevers
- Canton: Guérigny

Government
  - Mayor (2020–2026): Robert Vincent
- Area^{1}: 18.02 km^{2} (6.96 sq mi)
- Highest elevation: 306 m (1,004 ft)
- Lowest elevation: 208 m (682 ft)
- Population (2023): 547
  - Density: 30.4/km^{2} (78.6/sq mi)
- Time zone: UTC+01:00 (CET)
  - Summer (DST): UTC+02:00 (CEST)
- INSEE/Postal code: 58247 /58270
- ^{1} French Land Register data, which excludes lakes, ponds, glaciers > 1 km^{2} (0.386 sq mi or 247 acres) and river estuaries.

Saint-Jean-aux-Amognes (French pronunciation: [sɛ̃ ʒɑ̃ o.z‿amɔɲ]) is a commune in the Nièvre department in central France.

== See also ==
- Communes of the Nièvre department
