= Diennes-Aubigny =

- Commune
- Location of Diennes-Aubigny
- Location within France Location within Bourgogne-Franche-Comté
- Coordinates: 46°55′16″N 3°34′58″E
- Country: France
- Region: Bourgogne-Franche-Comté
- Department: Nièvre
- Arrondissement: Nevers
- Canton: Guérigny

Government
  - Mayor (2020–2026): Eric Robert Cottin
- Area^{1}: 36.89 km^{2} (14.24 sq mi)
- Highest elevation: 287 m (942 ft)
- Lowest elevation: 192 m (630 ft)
- Population (2023): 88
  - Density: 2.4/km^{2} (6.2/sq mi)
- Time zone: UTC+01:00 (CET)
  - Summer (DST): UTC+02:00 (CEST)
- INSEE/Postal code: 58097 /58340
- ^{1} French Land Register data, which excludes lakes, ponds, glaciers > 1 km^{2} (0.386 sq mi or 247 acres) and river estuaries.

Diennes-Aubigny (French pronunciation: [djɛn obiɲi]) is a commune in the department of Nièvre, central France.

== See also ==
- Communes of the Nièvre department
