= Montigny-aux-Amognes =

- Commune
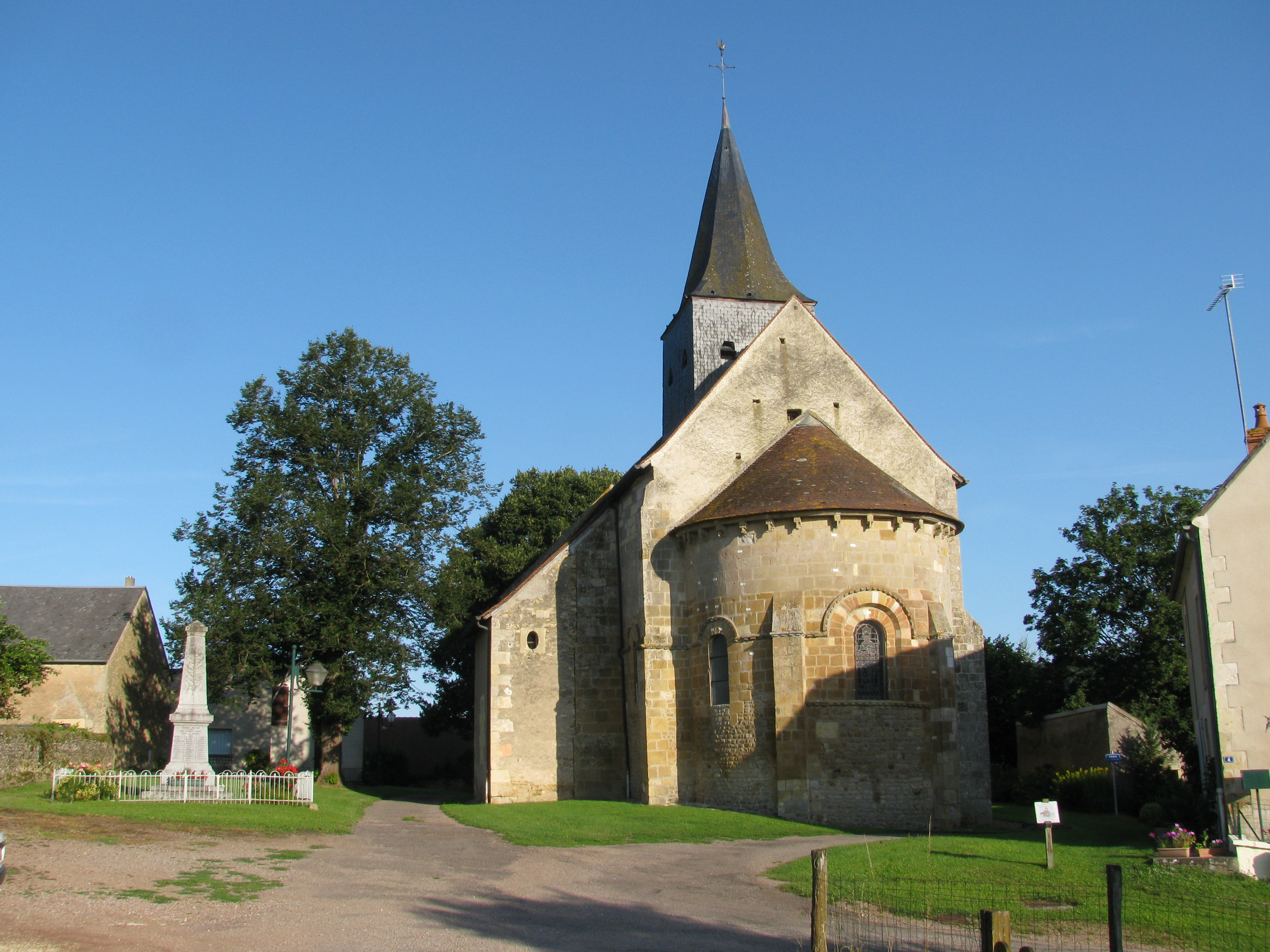
- The church of Saint-Louis, in Montigny
- Location of Montigny-aux-Amognes
- Location within France Location within Bourgogne-Franche-Comté
- Coordinates: 47°01′42″N 3°17′27″E
- Country: France
- Region: Bourgogne-Franche-Comté
- Department: Nièvre
- Arrondissement: Nevers
- Canton: Guérigny

Government
  - Mayor (2020–2026): Christian Perceau
- Area^{1}: 25.17 km^{2} (9.72 sq mi)
- Highest elevation: 302 m (991 ft)
- Lowest elevation: 184 m (604 ft)
- Population (2023): 621
  - Density: 24.7/km^{2} (63.9/sq mi)
- Time zone: UTC+01:00 (CET)
  - Summer (DST): UTC+02:00 (CEST)
- INSEE/Postal code: 58176 /58130
- ^{1} French Land Register data, which excludes lakes, ponds, glaciers > 1 km^{2} (0.386 sq mi or 247 acres) and river estuaries.

Montigny-aux-Amognes (French pronunciation: [mɔ̃tiɲi o.z‿amɔɲ]) is a commune in the Nièvre department in central France.

== See also ==
- Communes of the Nièvre department
