= Jailly =

- Commune
- Location of Jailly
- Location within France Location within Bourgogne-Franche-Comté
- Coordinates: 47°05′48″N 3°28′44″E
- Country: France
- Region: Bourgogne-Franche-Comté
- Department: Nièvre
- Arrondissement: Nevers
- Canton: Guérigny
- Intercommunality: Amognes Cœur du Nivernais

Government
  - Mayor (2020–2026): Lucien Bacq
- Area^{1}: 10.74 km^{2} (4.15 sq mi)
- Highest elevation: 394 m (1,293 ft)
- Lowest elevation: 273 m (896 ft)
- Population (2023): 67
  - Density: 6.2/km^{2} (16/sq mi)
- Time zone: UTC+01:00 (CET)
  - Summer (DST): UTC+02:00 (CEST)
- INSEE/Postal code: 58136 /58330
- ^{1} French Land Register data, which excludes lakes, ponds, glaciers > 1 km^{2} (0.386 sq mi or 247 acres) and river estuaries.

Jailly (French pronunciation: [ʒaji]) is a commune in the Nièvre department in central France.

== Population ==
Historical population
Year	Pop.	±% p.a.
1968	119	—
1975	114	−0.61%
1982	92	−3.02%
1990	78	−2.04%
1999	76	−0.29%
2007	68	−1.38%
2012	61	−2.15%
2017	64	+0.96%
2023	67	+0.77%
Source: INSEE

== See also ==
- Communes of the Nièvre department
