= La Fermeté =

- Commune
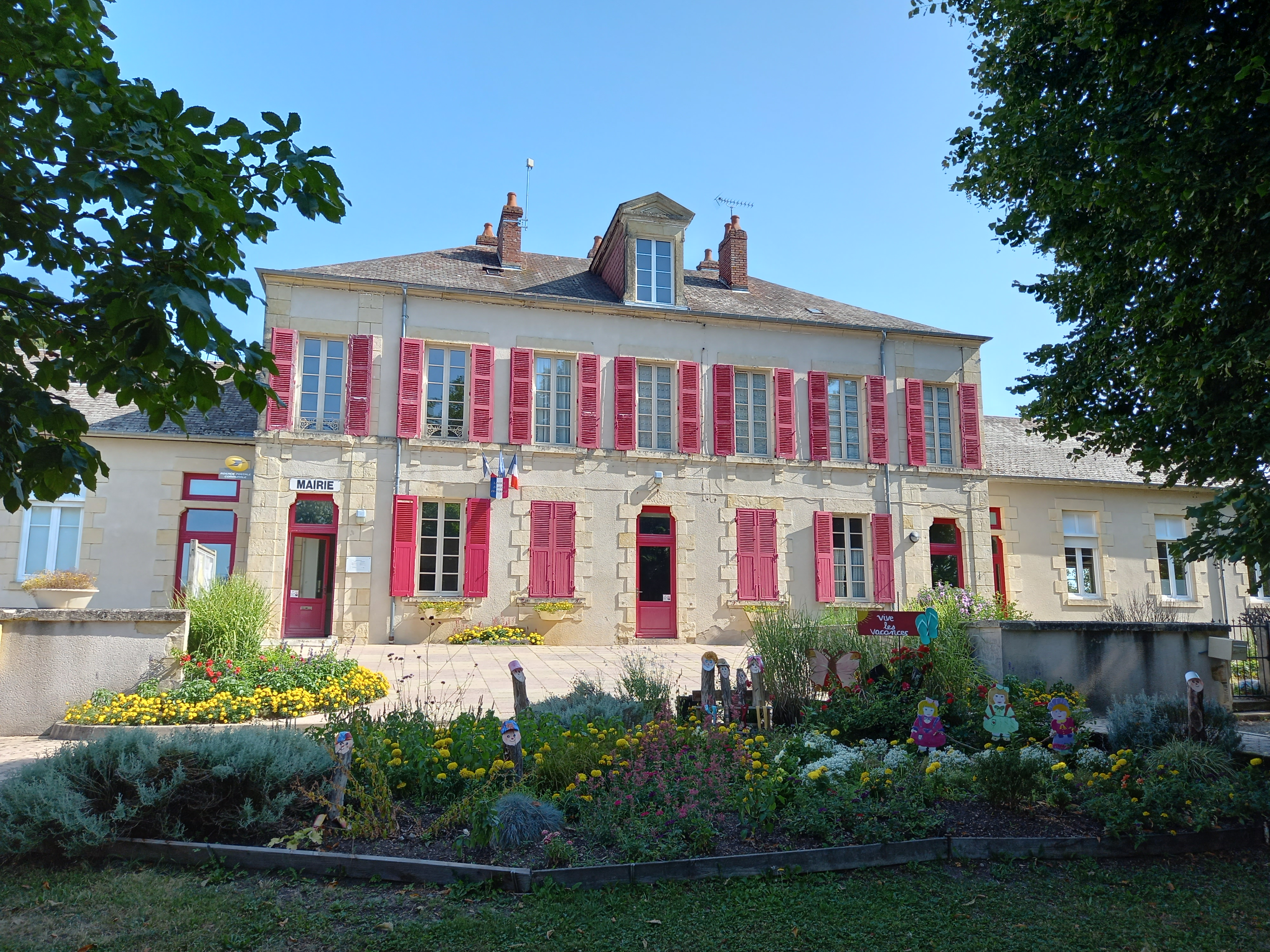
- Town hall of La Fermeté
- Location of La Fermeté
- Location within France Location within Bourgogne-Franche-Comté
- Coordinates: 46°58′02″N 3°20′03″E
- Country: France
- Region: Bourgogne-Franche-Comté
- Department: Nièvre
- Arrondissement: Nevers
- Canton: Guérigny

Government
  - Mayor (2020–2026): Ingrid Grzeskowiak
- Area^{1}: 36.02 km^{2} (13.91 sq mi)
- Highest elevation: 324 m (1,063 ft)
- Lowest elevation: 182 m (597 ft)
- Population (2023): 617
  - Density: 17.1/km^{2} (44.4/sq mi)
- Time zone: UTC+01:00 (CET)
  - Summer (DST): UTC+02:00 (CEST)
- INSEE/Postal code: 58112 /58160
- ^{1} French Land Register data, which excludes lakes, ponds, glaciers > 1 km^{2} (0.386 sq mi or 247 acres) and river estuaries.

La Fermeté (French pronunciation: [la fɛʁməte]) is a commune in the Nièvre department in central France.

== See also ==
- Communes of the Nièvre department
