= Crux-la-Ville =

- Commune
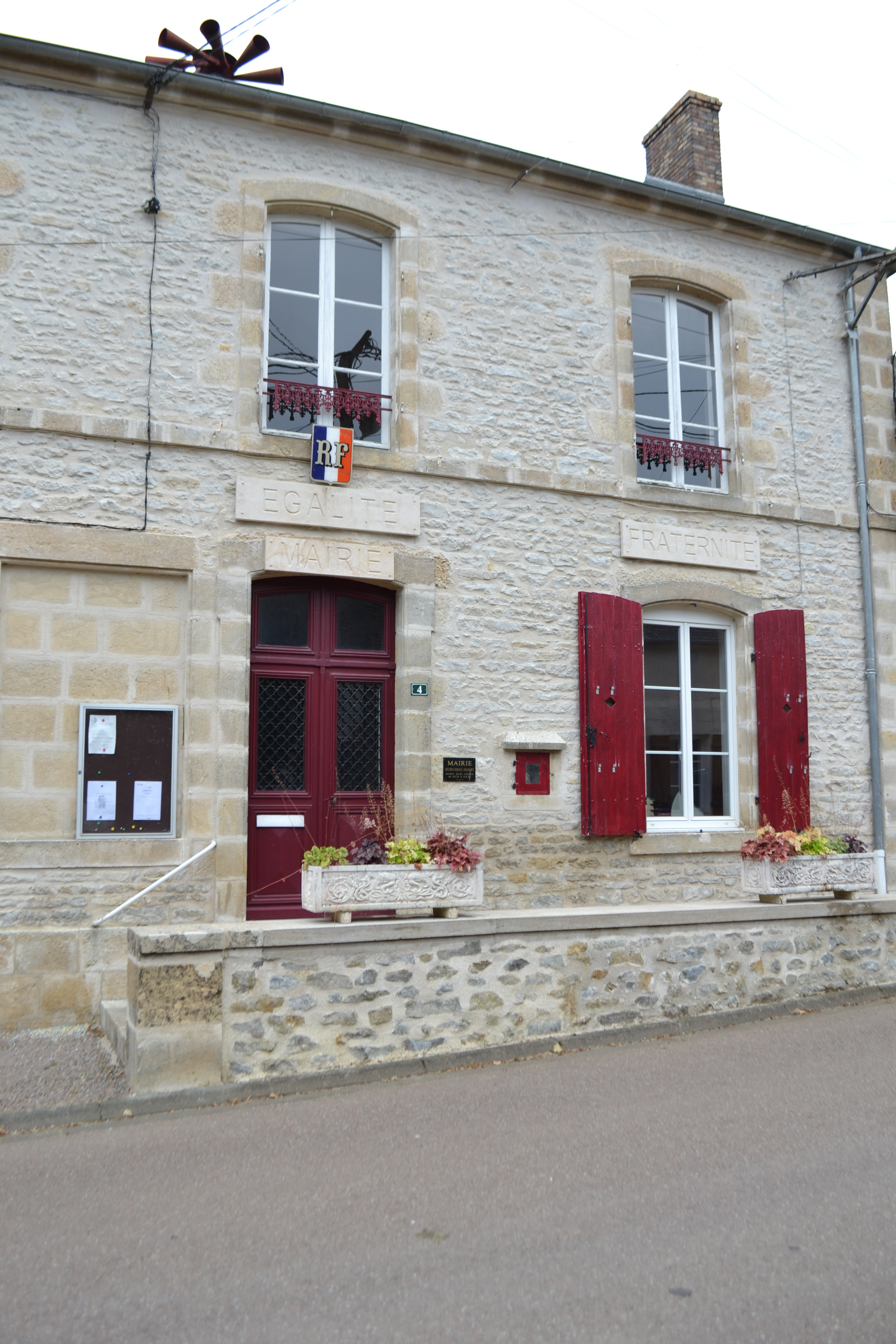
- Town hall
- Location of Crux-la-Ville
- Location within France Location within Bourgogne-Franche-Comté
- Coordinates: 47°09′42″N 3°31′19″E
- Country: France
- Region: Bourgogne-Franche-Comté
- Department: Nièvre
- Arrondissement: Nevers
- Canton: Guérigny

Government
  - Mayor (2020–2026): Jean-Marie Gatignol
- Area^{1}: 45.56 km^{2} (17.59 sq mi)
- Elevation: 300 m (980 ft)
- Highest elevation: 398 m (1,306 ft)
- Lowest elevation: 246 m (807 ft)
- Population (2023): 399
  - Density: 8.76/km^{2} (22.7/sq mi)
- Time zone: UTC+01:00 (CET)
  - Summer (DST): UTC+02:00 (CEST)
- INSEE/Postal code: 58092 /58330
- ^{1} French Land Register data, which excludes lakes, ponds, glaciers > 1 km^{2} (0.386 sq mi or 247 acres) and river estuaries.

Crux-la-Ville is a commune in the Nièvre department in central France.

== See also ==
- Communes of the Nièvre department
