= Nolay, Nièvre =

Nolay
- Commune
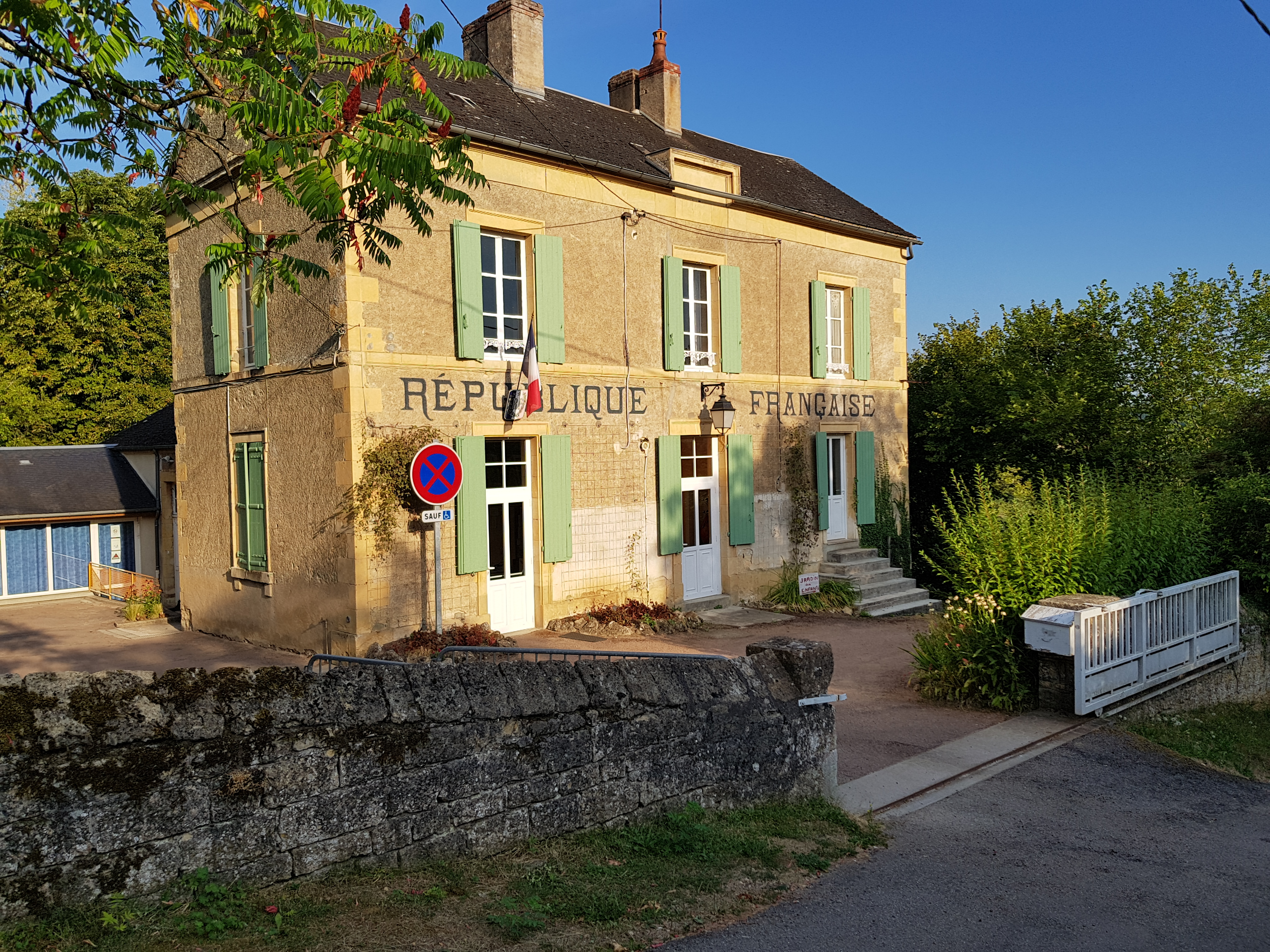
- Town hall in 2018
- Location of Nolay
- Location within France Location within Bourgogne-Franche-Comté
- Coordinates: 47°07′19″N 3°19′26″E
- Country: France
- Region: Bourgogne-Franche-Comté
- Department: Nièvre
- Arrondissement: Nevers
- Canton: Guérigny

Government
  - Mayor (2020–2026): Josette Fleuriet
- Area^{1}: 43.04 km^{2} (16.62 sq mi)
- Highest elevation: 438 m (1,437 ft)
- Lowest elevation: 209 m (686 ft)
- Population (2023): 353
  - Density: 8.20/km^{2} (21.2/sq mi)
- Time zone: UTC+01:00 (CET)
  - Summer (DST): UTC+02:00 (CEST)
- INSEE/Postal code: 58196 /58700
- ^{1} French Land Register data, which excludes lakes, ponds, glaciers > 1 km^{2} (0.386 sq mi or 247 acres) and river estuaries.

Nolay (French pronunciation: [nɔlɛ]) is a commune in the Nièvre department in central France.

== See also ==
- Communes of the Nièvre department
