= Anlezy =

- Commune
- Location of Anlezy
- Location within France Location within Bourgogne-Franche-Comté
- Coordinates: 46°57′28″N 3°30′23″E
- Country: France
- Region: Bourgogne-Franche-Comté
- Department: Nièvre
- Arrondissement: Nevers
- Canton: Guérigny

Government
  - Mayor (2020–2026): Jean Desir
- Area^{1}: 21.13 km^{2} (8.16 sq mi)
- Highest elevation: 305 m (1,001 ft)
- Lowest elevation: 208 m (682 ft)
- Population (2023): 240
  - Density: 11/km^{2} (29/sq mi)
- Time zone: UTC+01:00 (CET)
  - Summer (DST): UTC+02:00 (CEST)
- INSEE/Postal code: 58006 /58270
- ^{1} French Land Register data, which excludes lakes, ponds, glaciers > 1 km^{2} (0.386 sq mi or 247 acres) and river estuaries.

Anlezy (French pronunciation: [ɑ̃lzi]) is a commune in the Nièvre department in central France.

== Population ==
Historical population
Year	Pop.	±% p.a.
1968	438	—
1975	367	−2.49%
1982	330	−1.51%
1990	335	+0.19%
1999	310	−0.86%
2007	285	−1.05%
2012	279	−0.42%
2017	246	−2.49%
2023	240	−0.41%
Source: INSEE

== Geography ==
Surrounded by forests and hills, Anlezy is a town between the plains of the Loire Valley and the Morvan massif.

== See also ==
- Communes of the Nièvre department
