= Poiseux =

- Commune
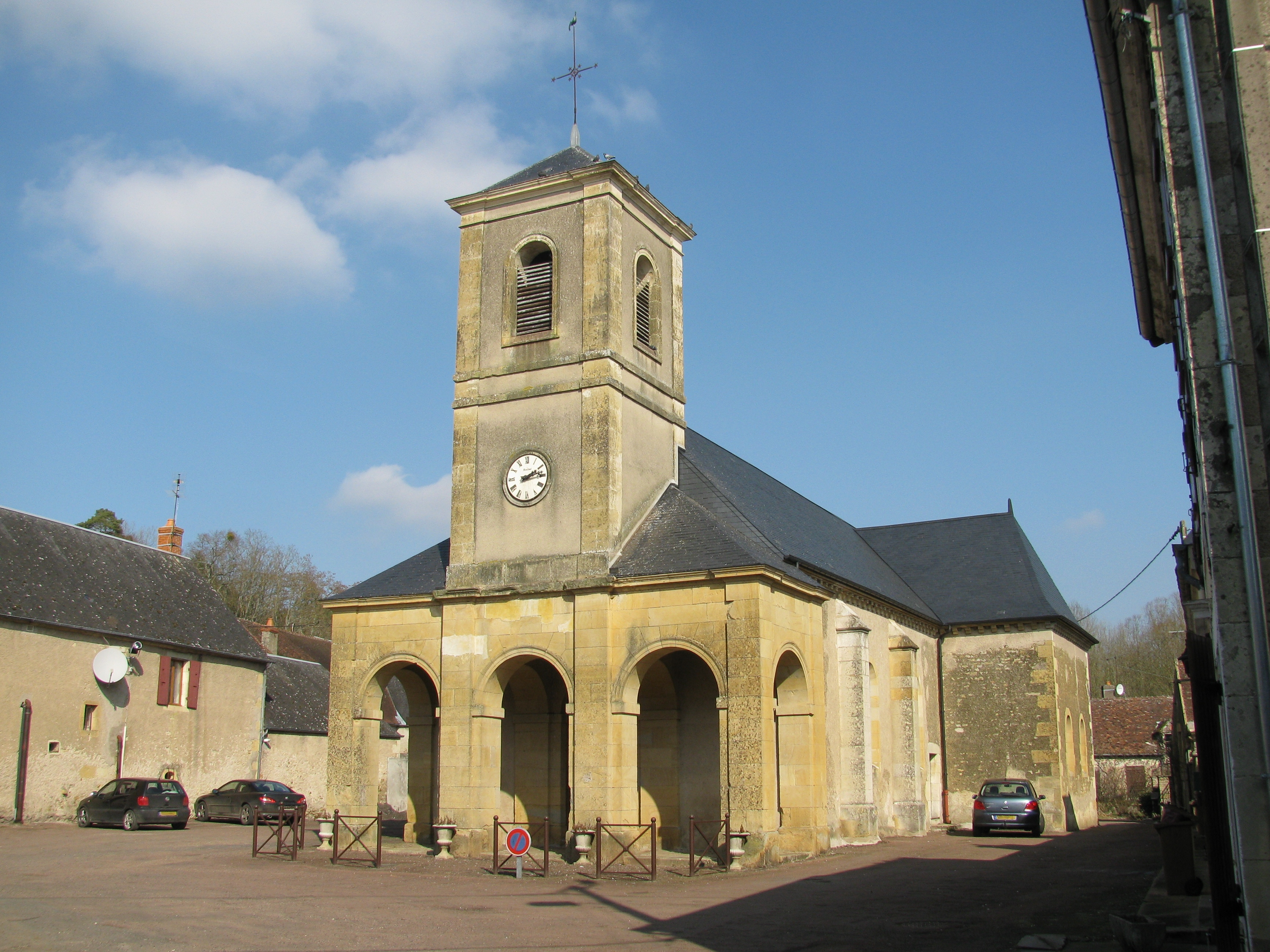
- The church in Poiseux
- Location of Poiseux
- Location within France Location within Bourgogne-Franche-Comté
- Coordinates: 47°07′15″N 3°13′58″E
- Country: France
- Region: Bourgogne-Franche-Comté
- Department: Nièvre
- Arrondissement: Nevers
- Canton: Guérigny
- Intercommunality: Les Bertranges

Government
  - Mayor (2020–2026): Jean-Louis Fity
- Area^{1}: 30.20 km^{2} (11.66 sq mi)
- Highest elevation: 335 m (1,099 ft)
- Lowest elevation: 197 m (646 ft)
- Population (2023): 331
  - Density: 11.0/km^{2} (28.4/sq mi)
- Time zone: UTC+01:00 (CET)
  - Summer (DST): UTC+02:00 (CEST)
- INSEE/Postal code: 58212 /58130
- ^{1} French Land Register data, which excludes lakes, ponds, glaciers > 1 km^{2} (0.386 sq mi or 247 acres) and river estuaries.

Poiseux (French pronunciation: [pwazø]) is a commune in the Nièvre department in central France.

== See also ==
- Communes of the Nièvre department
