= Saint-Franchy =

- Commune
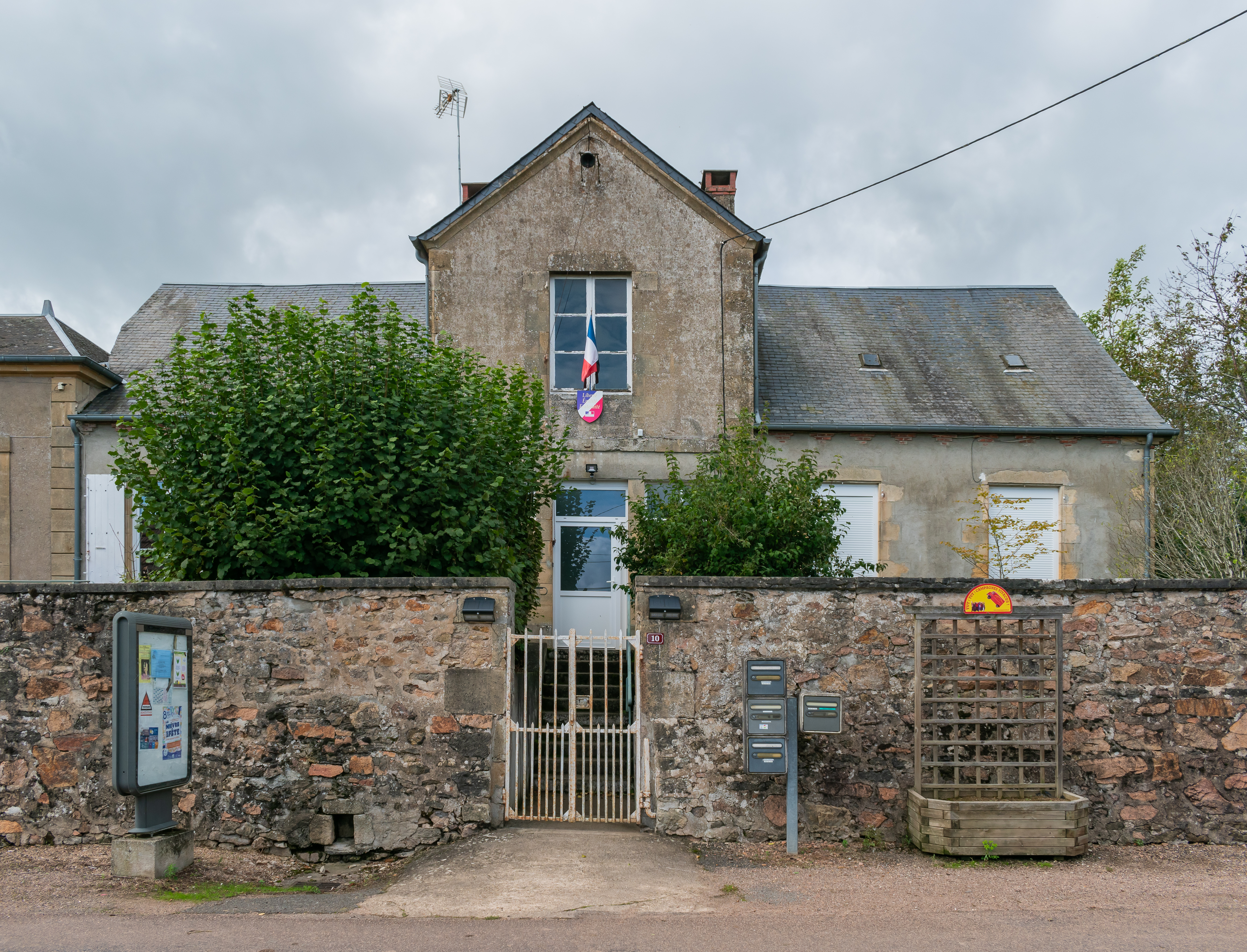
- Town hall of St-Franchy
- Location of Saint-Franchy
- Location within France Location within Bourgogne-Franche-Comté
- Coordinates: 47°08′25″N 3°27′43″E
- Country: France
- Region: Bourgogne-Franche-Comté
- Department: Nièvre
- Arrondissement: Nevers
- Canton: Guérigny

Government
  - Mayor (2020–2026): Laurent Belin
- Area^{1}: 18.63 km^{2} (7.19 sq mi)
- Highest elevation: 397 m (1,302 ft)
- Lowest elevation: 248 m (814 ft)
- Population (2023): 81
  - Density: 4.3/km^{2} (11/sq mi)
- Time zone: UTC+01:00 (CET)
  - Summer (DST): UTC+02:00 (CEST)
- INSEE/Postal code: 58240 /58330
- ^{1} French Land Register data, which excludes lakes, ponds, glaciers > 1 km^{2} (0.386 sq mi or 247 acres) and river estuaries.

Saint-Franchy (French pronunciation: [sɛ̃ fʁɑ̃ʃi]) is a commune in the Nièvre department in central France.

== Demographics ==
Historical population
Year	Pop.	±% p.a.
1968	157	—
1975	117	−4.11%
1982	92	−3.38%
1990	69	−3.53%
1999	59	−1.72%
2007	69	+1.98%
2012	75	+1.68%
2017	74	−0.27%
2023	81	+1.52%
Source: INSEE

== See also ==
- Communes of the Nièvre department
