= Guérigny =

- Commune
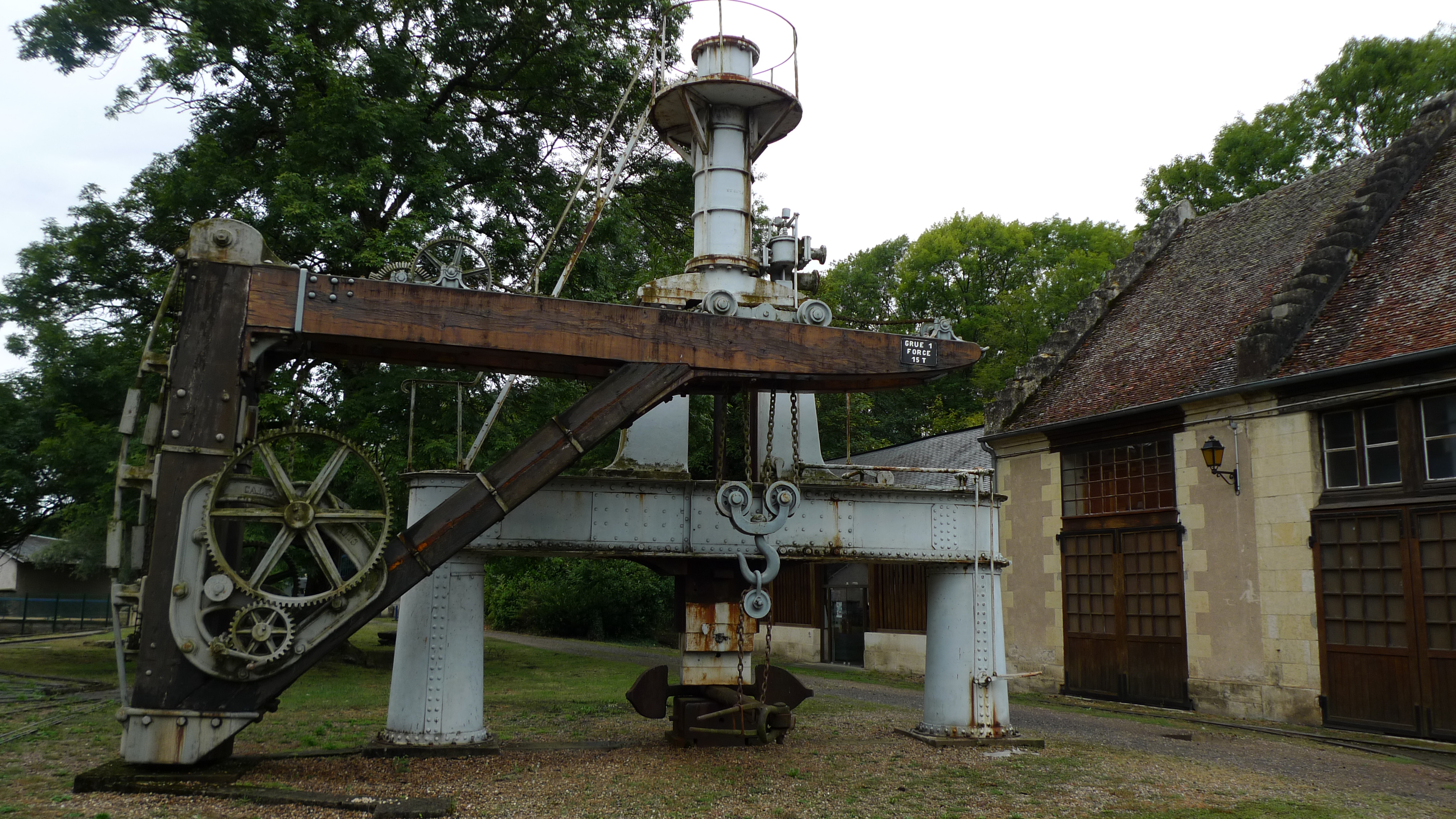
- The royal forge of La Chaussade

- Coat of arms
- Location of Guérigny
- Location within France Location within Bourgogne-Franche-Comté
- Coordinates: 47°05′19″N 3°11′43″E
- Country: France
- Region: Bourgogne-Franche-Comté
- Department: Nièvre
- Arrondissement: Nevers
- Canton: Guérigny

Government
  - Mayor (2020–2026): Jean-Pierre Château
- Area^{1}: 7.29 km^{2} (2.81 sq mi)
- Highest elevation: 291 m (955 ft)
- Lowest elevation: 192 m (630 ft)
- Population (2023): 2,505
  - Density: 344/km^{2} (890/sq mi)
- Time zone: UTC+01:00 (CET)
  - Summer (DST): UTC+02:00 (CEST)
- INSEE/Postal code: 58131 /58130
- ^{1} French Land Register data, which excludes lakes, ponds, glaciers > 1 km^{2} (0.386 sq mi or 247 acres) and river estuaries.

Guérigny (French pronunciation: [ɡeʁiɲi]) is a commune in the Nièvre department in central France.

== History ==
The commune obtained the 'Cité de Caractère de Bourgogne-Franche-Comté' label in 2021.

As of 1 January 2024, Guérigny is classified as a rural market town ('bourg rural').

== Demographics ==
Historical population
Year	Pop.	±% p.a.
1968	2,984	—
1975	2,472	−2.65%
1982	2,417	−0.32%
1990	2,414	−0.02%
1999	2,474	+0.27%
2007	2,573	+0.49%
2012	2,577	+0.03%
2017	2,514	−0.49%
2023	2,505	−0.06%
Source: INSEE

== See also ==
- Communes of the Nièvre department
