= Cizely =

- Commune
- Location of Cizely
- Location within France Location within Bourgogne-Franche-Comté
- Coordinates: 46°59′23″N 3°29′06″E
- Country: France
- Region: Bourgogne-Franche-Comté
- Department: Nièvre
- Arrondissement: Nevers
- Canton: Guérigny
- Intercommunality: Amognes Cœur du Nivernais

Government
  - Mayor (2022–2026): Patricia Beades
- Area^{1}: 7.10 km^{2} (2.74 sq mi)
- Highest elevation: 292 m (958 ft)
- Lowest elevation: 223 m (732 ft)
- Population (2023): 51
  - Density: 7.2/km^{2} (19/sq mi)
- Time zone: UTC+01:00 (CET)
  - Summer (DST): UTC+02:00 (CEST)
- INSEE/Postal code: 58078 /58270
- ^{1} French Land Register data, which excludes lakes, ponds, glaciers > 1 km^{2} (0.386 sq mi or 247 acres) and river estuaries.

Cizely (French pronunciation: [sizli]) is a commune in the Nièvre department in central France. On 1 January 2021, the estimated population was 53.

== See also ==
- Communes of the Nièvre department
