= Beaumont-Sardolles =

- Commune
- Location of Beaumont-Sardolles
- Location within France Location within Bourgogne-Franche-Comté
- Coordinates: 46°55′37″N 3°24′01″E
- Country: France
- Region: Bourgogne-Franche-Comté
- Department: Nièvre
- Arrondissement: Nevers
- Canton: Guérigny

Government
  - Mayor (2020–2026): Éric Compot
- Area^{1}: 29.14 km^{2} (11.25 sq mi)
- Highest elevation: 328 m (1,076 ft)
- Lowest elevation: 204 m (669 ft)
- Population (2023): 114
  - Density: 3.91/km^{2} (10.1/sq mi)
- Time zone: UTC+01:00 (CET)
  - Summer (DST): UTC+02:00 (CEST)
- INSEE/Postal code: 58028 /58270
- ^{1} French Land Register data, which excludes lakes, ponds, glaciers > 1 km^{2} (0.386 sq mi or 247 acres) and river estuaries.

Beaumont-Sardolles (French pronunciation: [bomɔ̃ saʁdɔl]) is a commune in the Nièvre department in central France.

== Population ==
Historical population
Year	Pop.	±% p.a.
1968	240	—
1975	194	−2.99%
1982	161	−2.63%
1990	118	−3.81%
1999	107	−1.08%
2007	119	+1.34%
2012	127	+1.31%
2017	115	−1.97%
2023	114	−0.15%
Source: INSEE

== See also ==
- Communes of the Nièvre department
