= Bazolles =

- Commune
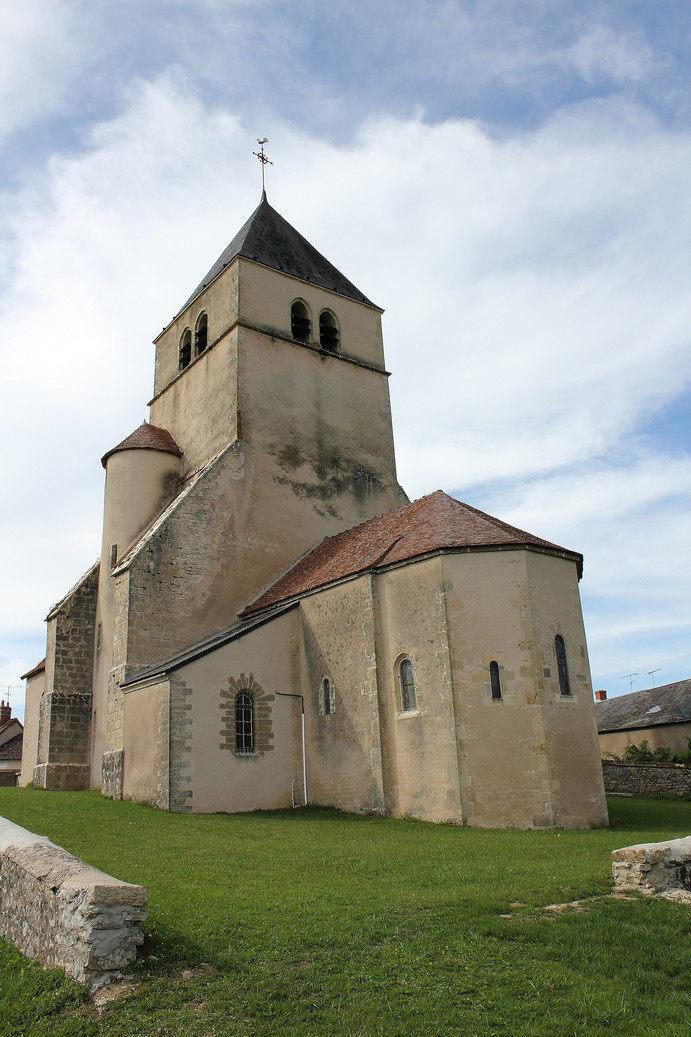
- The church of Saint-Symphorien, in Bazolles
- Location of Bazolles
- Location within France Location within Bourgogne-Franche-Comté
- Coordinates: 47°08′35″N 3°37′04″E
- Country: France
- Region: Bourgogne-Franche-Comté
- Department: Nièvre
- Arrondissement: Nevers
- Canton: Guérigny

Government
  - Mayor (2020–2026): Jocelyne Baroin
- Area^{1}: 28.57 km^{2} (11.03 sq mi)
- Highest elevation: 302 m (991 ft)
- Lowest elevation: 245 m (804 ft)
- Population (2023): 286
  - Density: 10.0/km^{2} (25.9/sq mi)
- Time zone: UTC+01:00 (CET)
  - Summer (DST): UTC+02:00 (CEST)
- INSEE/Postal code: 58024 /58110
- ^{1} French Land Register data, which excludes lakes, ponds, glaciers > 1 km^{2} (0.386 sq mi or 247 acres) and river estuaries.

Bazolles (French pronunciation: [bazɔl]) is a commune in the Nièvre department in central France.

== Population ==
Historical population
Year	Pop.	±% p.a.
1968	440	—
1975	325	−4.24%
1982	320	−0.22%
1990	260	−2.56%
1999	265	+0.21%
2007	267	+0.09%
2012	283	+1.17%
2017	279	−0.28%
2023	286	+0.41%
Source: INSEE

== See also ==
- Communes of the Nièvre department
