= Saint-Benin-des-Bois =

- Commune
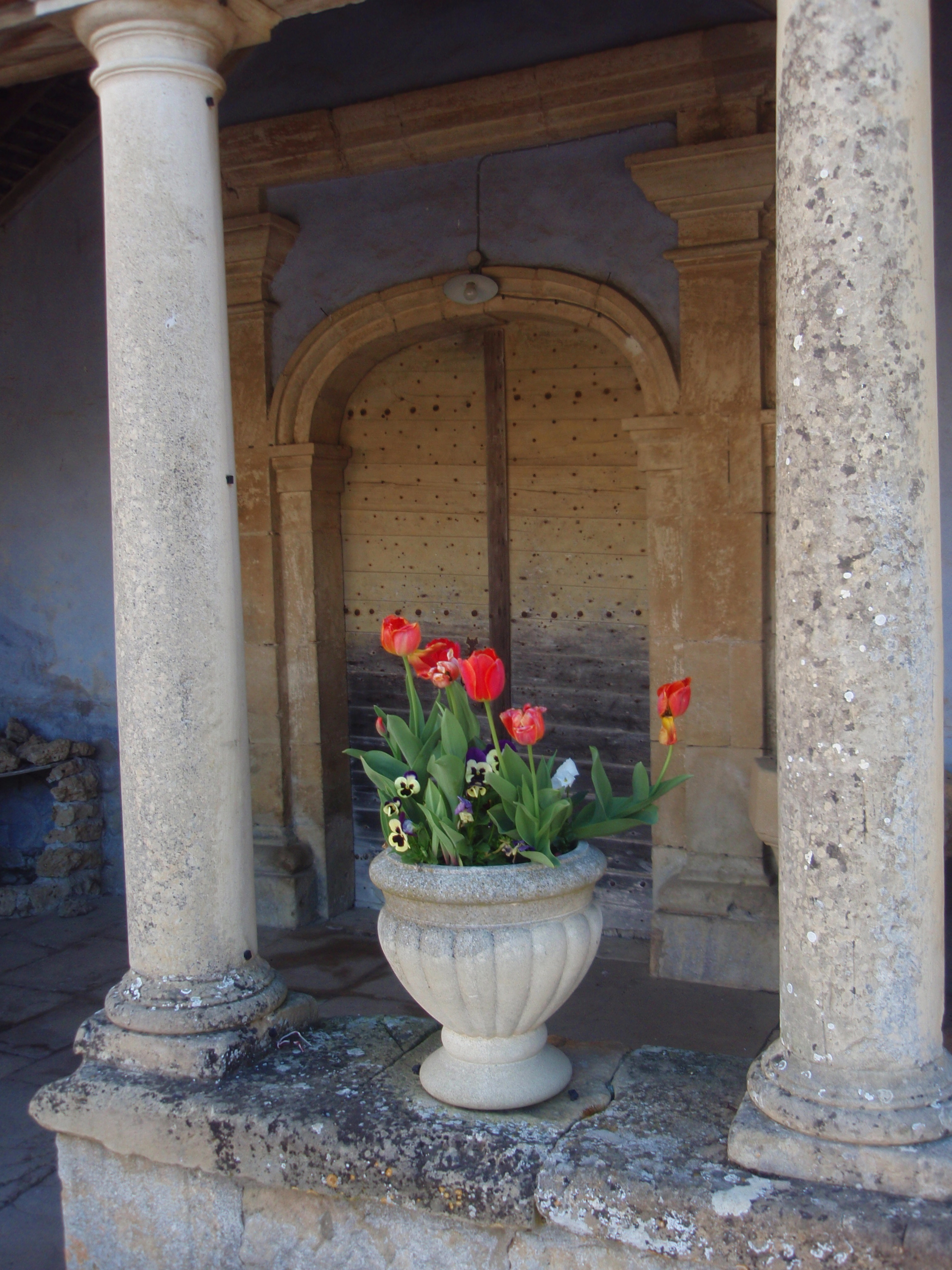
- The entrance to the church in Saint-Benin-des-Bois
- Location of Saint-Benin-des-Bois
- Location within France Location within Bourgogne-Franche-Comté
- Coordinates: 47°07′24″N 3°24′37″E
- Country: France
- Region: Bourgogne-Franche-Comté
- Department: Nièvre
- Arrondissement: Nevers
- Canton: Guérigny
- Intercommunality: Amognes Cœur du Nivernais

Government
  - Mayor (2020–2026): Daniel Tisse
- Area^{1}: 19.40 km^{2} (7.49 sq mi)
- Highest elevation: 444 m (1,457 ft)
- Lowest elevation: 248 m (814 ft)
- Population (2023): 195
  - Density: 10.1/km^{2} (26.0/sq mi)
- Time zone: UTC+01:00 (CET)
  - Summer (DST): UTC+02:00 (CEST)
- INSEE/Postal code: 58233 /58330
- ^{1} French Land Register data, which excludes lakes, ponds, glaciers > 1 km^{2} (0.386 sq mi or 247 acres) and river estuaries.

Saint-Benin-des-Bois is a commune in the Nièvre department in central France.

== See also ==
- Communes of the Nièvre department
