= Saint-Sulpice, Nièvre =

Saint-Sulpice
- Commune
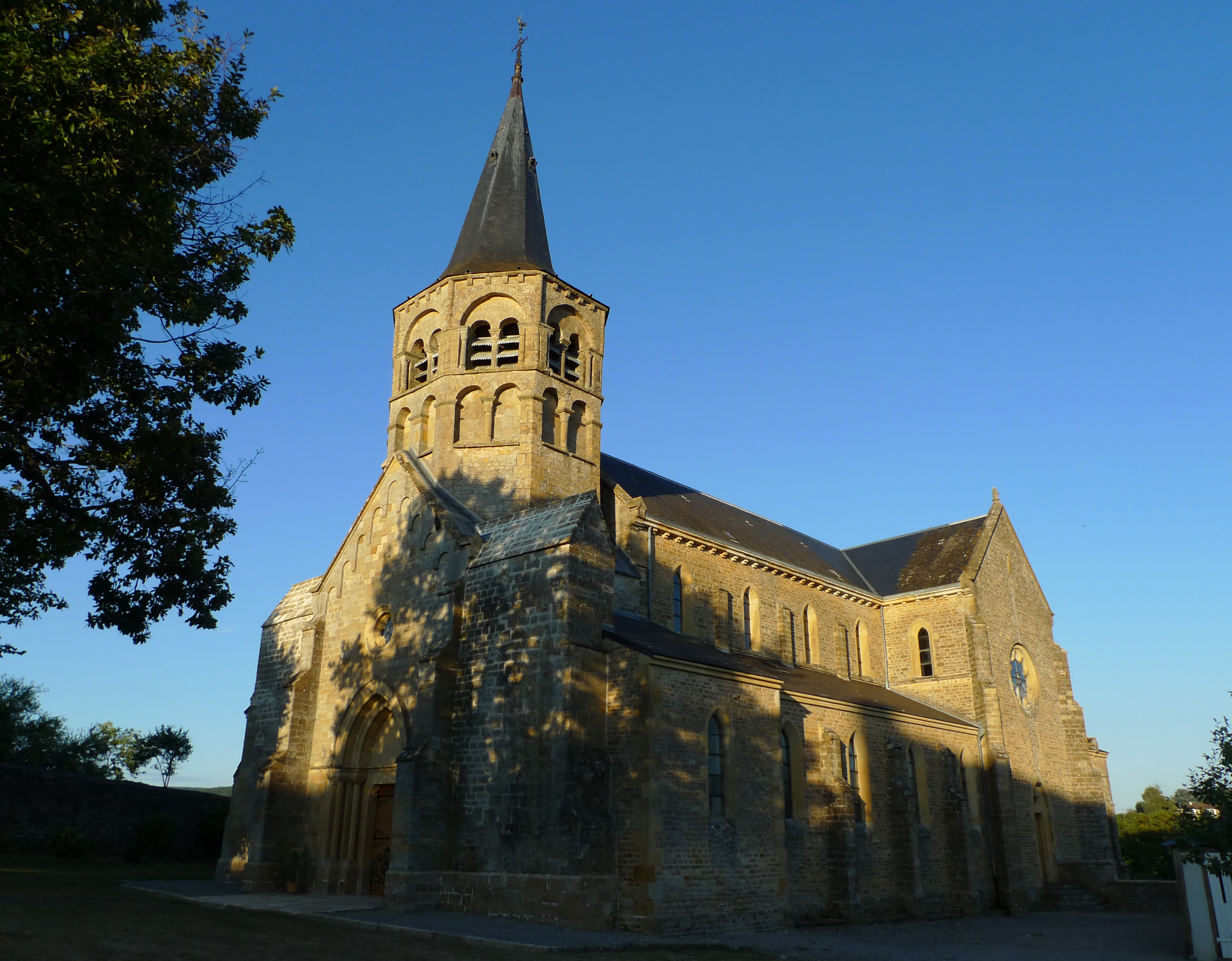
- The church in Saint-Sulpice
- Location of Saint-Sulpice
- Location within France Location within Bourgogne-Franche-Comté
- Coordinates: 47°03′22″N 3°20′54″E
- Country: France
- Region: Bourgogne-Franche-Comté
- Department: Nièvre
- Arrondissement: Nevers
- Canton: Guérigny

Government
  - Mayor (2020–2026): Jean-Luc Cottenot
- Area^{1}: 25.71 km^{2} (9.93 sq mi)
- Highest elevation: 441 m (1,447 ft)
- Lowest elevation: 233 m (764 ft)
- Population (2023): 418
  - Density: 16.3/km^{2} (42.1/sq mi)
- Time zone: UTC+01:00 (CET)
  - Summer (DST): UTC+02:00 (CEST)
- INSEE/Postal code: 58269 /58270
- ^{1} French Land Register data, which excludes lakes, ponds, glaciers > 1 km^{2} (0.386 sq mi or 247 acres) and river estuaries.

Saint-Sulpice (French pronunciation: [sɛ̃ sylpis]; Berrichon: Saint-Spi) is a commune in the Nièvre department in central France.

== History ==
The Romans built the Roman road from Nevers to Alluy, of which only a few sections remain towards Sury in Saint-Jean-aux-Amognes and the place called the Forest in the town.

During the revolutionary period of the National Convention (1792–1795), the town bore the name of Roche-la-Montagne.

== Demographics ==
Historical population
| Year | Pop. | ±% p.a. |
|---|---|---|
| 1968 | 405 | — |
| 1975 | 330 | −2.88% |
| 1982 | 338 | +0.34% |
| 1990 | 407 | +2.35% |
| 1999 | 433 | +0.69% |
| 2007 | 474 | +1.14% |
| 2012 | 446 | −1.21% |
| 2017 | 399 | −2.20% |
| 2023 | 418 | +0.78% |
Source: INSEE

== See also ==
- Communes of the Nièvre department
