= Frasnay-Reugny =

- Commune
- Location of Frasnay-Reugny
- Location within France Location within Bourgogne-Franche-Comté
- Coordinates: 46°59′56″N 3°30′39″E
- Country: France
- Region: Bourgogne-Franche-Comté
- Department: Nièvre
- Arrondissement: Nevers
- Canton: Guérigny

Government
  - Mayor (2020–2026): Frédéric Duquenoy
- Area^{1}: 13.62 km^{2} (5.26 sq mi)
- Highest elevation: 295 m (968 ft)
- Lowest elevation: 220 m (720 ft)
- Population (2023): 79
  - Density: 5.8/km^{2} (15/sq mi)
- Time zone: UTC+01:00 (CET)
  - Summer (DST): UTC+02:00 (CEST)
- INSEE/Postal code: 58119 /58270
- ^{1} French Land Register data, which excludes lakes, ponds, glaciers > 1 km^{2} (0.386 sq mi or 247 acres) and river estuaries.

Frasnay-Reugny (French pronunciation: [fʁanɛ ʁøɲi]) is a commune in the Nièvre department in central France.

== See also ==
- Communes of the Nièvre department
