= Arrondissement of Nevers =

Coordinates: 46.9928°N 3.1617°E

Nevers
- Arrondissement
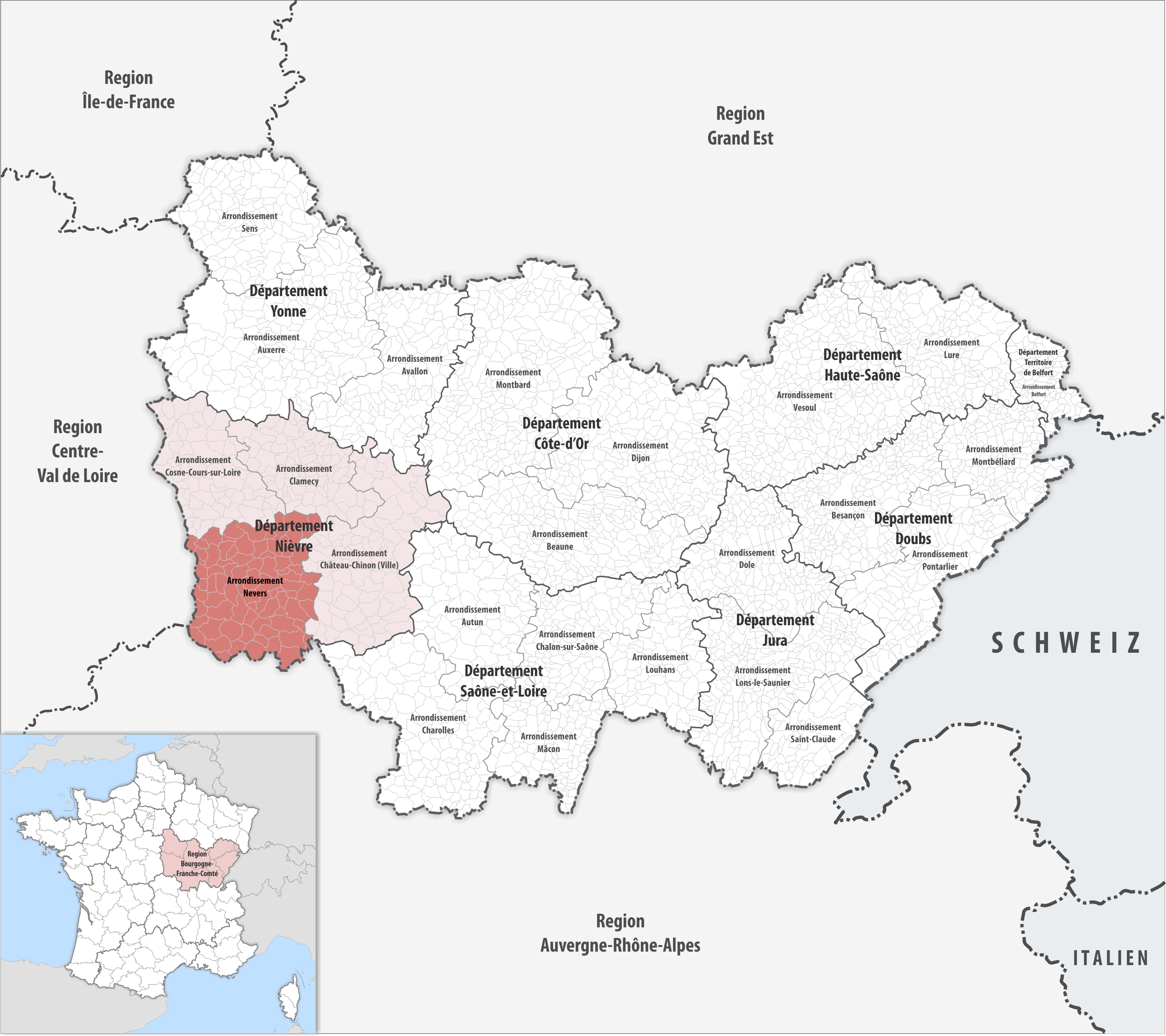
- Location within the region Bourgogne-Franche-Comté
- Country: France
- Region: Bourgogne-Franche-Comté
- Department: Nièvre
- No. of communes: {{{nbcomm}}}
- Area: 2,025.4 km^{2} (782.0 sq mi)
- Population (2023): 112,202
  - Density: 55.397/km^{2} (143.48/sq mi)
- INSEE code: 583

The arrondissement of Nevers is an arrondissement of France in the Nièvre department in the Bourgogne-Franche-Comté region. It has 82 communes. Its population is 112,787 (2021), and its area is 2,025.4 km^{2} (782.0 sq mi).

== Composition ==
The communes of the arrondissement of Nevers, and their INSEE codes, are:

1. Anlezy (58006)
2. Avril-sur-Loire (58020)
3. Azy-le-Vif (58021)
4. Bazolles (58024)
5. Béard (58025)
6. Beaumont-Sardolles (58028)
7. Billy-Chevannes (58031)
8. Bona (58035)
9. Challuy (58051)
10. Champvert (58055)
11. Chantenay-Saint-Imbert (58057)
12. Chevenon (58072)
13. Cizely (58078)
14. Cossaye (58087)
15. Coulanges-lès-Nevers (58088)
16. Crux-la-Ville (58092)
17. Decize (58095)
18. Devay (58096)
19. Diennes-Aubigny (58097)
20. Dornes (58104)
21. Druy-Parigny (58105)
22. La Fermeté (58112)
23. Fertrève (58113)
24. Fleury-sur-Loire (58115)
25. Fourchambault (58117)
26. Frasnay-Reugny (58119)
27. Garchizy (58121)
28. Germigny-sur-Loire (58124)
29. Gimouille (58126)
30. Guérigny (58131)
31. Imphy (58134)
32. Jailly (58136)
33. Lamenay-sur-Loire (58137)
34. Langeron (58138)
35. Limon (58143)
36. Livry (58144)
37. Lucenay-lès-Aix (58146)
38. Luthenay-Uxeloup (58148)
39. La Machine (58151)
40. Magny-Cours (58152)
41. Mars-sur-Allier (58158)
42. Marzy (58160)
43. Montigny-aux-Amognes (58176)
44. Neuville-lès-Decize (58192)
45. Nevers (58194)
46. Nolay (58196)
47. Parigny-les-Vaux (58207)
48. Poiseux (58212)
49. Pougues-les-Eaux (58214)
50. Rouy (58223)
51. Saincaize-Meauce (58225)
52. Saint-Benin-d'Azy (58232)
53. Saint-Benin-des-Bois (58233)
54. Saint-Éloi (58238)
55. Sainte-Marie (58253)
56. Saint-Firmin (58239)
57. Saint-Franchy (58240)
58. Saint-Germain-Chassenay (58241)
59. Saint-Jean-aux-Amognes (58247)
60. Saint-Léger-des-Vignes (58250)
61. Saint-Martin-d'Heuille (58254)
62. Saint-Maurice (58257)
63. Saint-Ouen-sur-Loire (58258)
64. Saint-Parize-en-Viry (58259)
65. Saint-Parize-le-Châtel (58260)
66. Saint-Pierre-le-Moûtier (58264)
67. Saint-Saulge (58267)
68. Saint-Sulpice (58269)
69. Sauvigny-les-Bois (58273)
70. Saxi-Bourdon (58275)
71. Sermoise-sur-Loire (58278)
72. Sougy-sur-Loire (58280)
73. Thianges (58291)
74. Toury-Lurcy (58293)
75. Toury-sur-Jour (58294)
76. Tresnay (58296)
77. Trois-Vèvres (58297)
78. Urzy (58300)
79. Varennes-Vauzelles (58303)
80. Vaux d'Amognes (58204)
81. Verneuil (58306)
82. Ville-Langy (58311)

== History ==
The arrondissement of Nevers was created in 1800. At the January 2017 reorganisation of the arrondissements of Nièvre, it gained one commune from the arrondissement of Château-Chinon (Ville), and it lost one commune to the arrondissement of Château-Chinon (Ville).

As a result of the reorganisation of the cantons of France which came into effect in 2015, the borders of the cantons are no longer related to the borders of the arrondissements. The cantons of the arrondissement of Nevers were, as of January 2015:

1. Decize
2. Dornes
3. Guérigny
4. Imphy
5. La Machine
6. Nevers-Centre
7. Nevers-Est
8. Nevers-Nord
9. Nevers-Sud
10. Pougues-les-Eaux
11. Saint-Benin-d'Azy
12. Saint-Pierre-le-Moûtier
13. Saint-Saulge
