= Saint-Benin-d'Azy =

- Commune
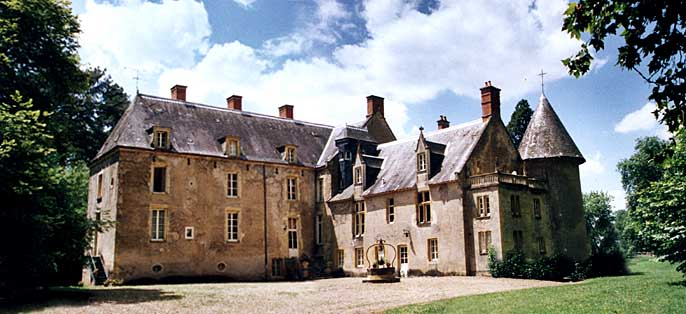
- Château du Vieil Azy

- Coat of arms
- Location of Saint-Benin-d'Azy
- Location within France Location within Bourgogne-Franche-Comté
- Coordinates: 47°00′01″N 3°23′36″E
- Country: France
- Region: Bourgogne-Franche-Comté
- Department: Nièvre
- Arrondissement: Nevers
- Canton: Guérigny
- Intercommunality: CC Amognes Cœur du Nivernais

Government
  - Mayor (2020–2026): Jean-Luc Gauthier
- Area^{1}: 35.80 km^{2} (13.82 sq mi)
- Highest elevation: 398 m (1,306 ft)
- Lowest elevation: 202 m (663 ft)
- Population (2023): 1,255
  - Density: 35.06/km^{2} (90.79/sq mi)
- Time zone: UTC+01:00 (CET)
  - Summer (DST): UTC+02:00 (CEST)
- INSEE/Postal code: 58232 /58270
- ^{1} French Land Register data, which excludes lakes, ponds, glaciers > 1 km^{2} (0.386 sq mi or 247 acres) and river estuaries.

Saint-Benin-d'Azy (French pronunciation: [sɛ̃ bənɛ̃ dazi]) is a commune in the Nièvre department in central France. The river Ixeure flows through the commune.

== Administration ==
Saint-Benin-d'Azy is part of the canton of Guérigny and of the arrondissement of Nevers. The town is also the administrative centre of the Communauté de communes Amognes Cœur du Nivernais, a community of 28 communes.

== History ==
The name of the town (Saint-Benin) comes from the evangelist "Saint-Begnine" who evangelized Burgundy. Azy is a reference to the Roman military camp which was based in Saint-Benin.

At the time of the French Revolution, the name was replaced with Azy aux Amognes which was more revolutionary. During this period, most of the town suffered of destructions. This is the case of the church Saint Christophe which was at the place of the current "Café des Arts" (a new church was built in 1830).

== Economy ==
The economy of this small town is currently agriculture and services.

In the past, there were small industrial companies producing iron. Like the other French small towns, Saint-Benin-d'Azy has some wine growers. The production is consumed locally.

== Notable people ==
The economist and sociologist Jean Fourastié

His celebrity comes from the invention of the expression «les 30 glorieuses» to qualify the economic situation of European countries after the WW2. He was born in Saint-Benin in 1907.

The artist Rosa Bonheur

Her quality paintings of animals have made her visit Saint-Benin a lot of times. She became a celebrity because of her painting Labourage Nivernais.

Some other personalities can be linked to Saint-Benin-d'Azy, such as Matthieu Poussereau, Paul Vacant or Niki de Saint Phalle.

== See also ==
- Communes of the Nièvre department
