= Canton of Guérigny =

Coordinates: 47.09°N 3.20°E

The canton of Guérigny is an administrative division of the Nièvre department, central France. Its borders were modified at the French canton reorganisation which came into effect in March 2015. Its seat is in Guérigny.

It consists of the following communes:

1. Anlezy
2. Bazolles
3. Beaumont-Sardolles
4. Billy-Chevannes
5. Bona
6. Cizely
7. Crux-la-Ville
8. Diennes-Aubigny
9. La Fermeté
10. Fertrève
11. Frasnay-Reugny
12. Guérigny
13. Jailly
14. Limon
15. Montigny-aux-Amognes
16. Nolay
17. Poiseux
18. Rouy
19. Saint-Benin-d'Azy
20. Saint-Benin-des-Bois
21. Sainte-Marie
22. Saint-Firmin
23. Saint-Franchy
24. Saint-Jean-aux-Amognes
25. Saint-Maurice
26. Saint-Martin-d'Heuille
27. Saint-Saulge
28. Saint-Sulpice
29. Saxi-Bourdon
30. Urzy
31. Vaux d'Amognes
32. Ville-Langy
