= Canton of Villeneuve-l'Archevêque =

Coordinates: 48°14′N 3°33′E

Villeneuve-l'Archevêque
- Former canton
- Interactive map of Villeneuve-l'Archevêque
- Country: France
- Region: Bourgogne-Franche-Comté
- Department: Yonne
- No. of communes: {{{nbcomm}}}
- Disbanded: 2015
- Population (2012): 6,313

The canton of Villeneuve-l'Archevêque is a former canton of France, located in the Yonne département. It had 6,313 inhabitants (2012). It was disestablished by the French reorganisation of cantons which came into effect in March 2015. It had 17 communes.

The canton comprised the following communes:

1. Bagneaux
2. Chigy
3. Les Clérimois
4. Courgenay
5. Flacy
6. Foissy-sur-Vanne
7. Lailly
8. Molinons
9. Pont-sur-Vanne
10. La Postolle
11. Saint-Maurice-aux-Riches-Hommes
12. Les Sièges
13. Theil-sur-Vanne
14. Vareilles
15. Villeneuve-l'Archevêque
16. Villiers-Louis
17. Voisines

== See also ==
- Cantons of the Yonne department
