= Route nationale 60 =

Route nationale 60 (or RN 60) is a Route nationale in France, connecting the commune of Orléans to that of Troyes. Before alterations in 1972, it joined Châteauneuf-sur-Loire to Toul via Troyes. A decree of December 5, 2005 has set out the declassification of the route. A high-speed roadway was constructed from Orléans to Châteauneuf-sur-Loire. The old route, previously a part of Route nationale 152, was declassified to RD 960. The route was declassified from RN 60 to RD 60 in Haute-Marne, and to RD 960 in Meuse, Meurthe-et-Moselle, and in Aube to the east of Troyes. In 2006, the road was declassified to D 660 in Aube to the west of Troyes and in Yonne, and to D 2060 in Loiret.

== From Orléans to Montargis (D 2060) ==
- Orléans 0 kilometres (0 mi)
- Saint-Jean-de-Braye 8 kilometres (5.0 mi)
- Combleux 11 kilometres (6.8 mi)
- Chécy 11 kilometres (6.8 mi)
- Mardié 15 kilometres (9.3 mi)
- Saint-Denis-de-l'Hôtel 20 kilometres (12 mi)
- Châteauneuf-sur-Loire 29 kilometres (18 mi)
- Le Pont-des-Besniers, commune de Sury-aux-Bois 42 kilometres (26 mi)
- Bellegarde 49 kilometres (30 mi)
- Ladon 57 kilometres (35 mi)
- Saint-Maurice-sur-Fessard 63 kilometres (39 mi)
- Villemandeur 69 kilometres (43 mi)
- Le Tourneau, commune de Pannes 70 kilometres (43 mi)
- Montargis 77 kilometres (48 mi)

== From Montargis to Sens (D 2060, D 660) ==
- Montargis 77 kilometres (48 mi)
- Amilly 78 kilometres (48 mi)
- La Chapelle-Saint-Sépulcre 87 kilometres (54 mi)
- La Maltournée, commune de Saint-Hilaire-les-Andrésis 100 kilometres (62 mi)
- Courtenay 103 kilometres (64 mi)
- Les Dornets, commune de Savigny-sur-Clairis 108 kilometres (67 mi)
- Subligny 121 kilometres (75 mi)
- Paron 126 kilometres (78 mi)
- Sens 129 kilometres (80 mi)

== From Sens to Vulaines (D 660) ==
- Sens 103 kilometres (64 mi)
- Malay-le-Petit 137 kilometres (85 mi)
- Le Petit-Villiers, commune de Villiers-Louis 139 kilometres (86 mi)
- Pont-sur-Vanne 142 kilometres (88 mi)
- La Grenouillère, commune de Chigy 145 kilometres (90 mi)
- Foissy-sur-Vanne 148 kilometres (92 mi)
- Molinons 151 kilometres (94 mi)
- Villeneuve-l'Archevêque 152 kilometres (94 mi)
- Bagneaux 155 kilometres (96 mi)
- Vulaines 157 kilometres (98 mi)

== From Vulaines to Troyes (D 660) ==
- Vulaines 157 kilometres (98 mi)
- Saint-Benoist-sur-Vanne 161 kilometres (100 mi)
- Cosdon 164 kilometres (102 mi)
- Villemaur-sur-Vanne 166 kilometres (103 mi)
- Estissac 173 kilometres (107 mi)
- Fontvannes 177 kilometres (110 mi)
- La Grange-au-Rez, commune de Montgueux 185 kilometres (115 mi)
- La Rivière-de-Corps 189 kilometres (117 mi)
- Sainte-Savine
- Troyes 193 kilometres (120 mi)

== From Troyes to Soulaines-Dhuys (D 960) ==
- Troyes
- Pont-Sainte-Marie
- Creney-près-Troyes
- La Belle-Épine, commune de Mesnil-Sellières
- Piney
- Lesmont
- Les Fontaines, commune de Précy-Saint-Martin
- Brienne-le-Château
- Chaumesnil
- Soulaines-Dhuys

== From Soulaines-Dhuys to Saudron (D 60) ==
- Soulaines-Dhuys
- Nully-Trémilly
- Blumeray
- Doulevant-le-Château
- Dommartin-le-Saint-Père
- Courcelles-sur-Blaise
- Dommartin-le-Franc
- Morancourt
- Nomécourt
- Joinville
- Thonnance-lès-Joinville
- Montreuil-sur-Thonnance
- Saudron

== From Saudron to Toul (D 960) ==
- Saudron
- Bonnet
- Houdelaincourt
- Delouze-Rosières
- Montigny-lès-Vaucouleurs
- Vaucouleurs
- Chalaines
- Saint-Martin
- Blénod-lès-Toul
- Toul
