= N60 =

N60 may refer to:

== Roads ==
- Route nationale 60, in France
- N60 road (Ireland)
- N-60 National Highway, in Pakistan
- Ortigas Avenue, in Manila, Philippines

== Other uses ==
- Dalabon language
- Nikon N60, a camera
- Toyota 4Runner (N60), a Japanese SUV
- Toyota Hilux (N60), a Japanese pickup truck
- Aion N60, a Chinese battery electric compact crossover SUV
