= Paroy-en-Othe =

- Commune
- Location of Paroy-en-Othe
- Location within France Location within Bourgogne-Franche-Comté
- Coordinates: 48°02′03″N 3°34′25″E
- Country: France
- Region: Bourgogne-Franche-Comté
- Department: Yonne
- Arrondissement: Auxerre
- Canton: Brienon-sur-Armançon

Government
  - Mayor (2020–2026): Murielle Bucina
- Area^{1}: 5.32 km^{2} (2.05 sq mi)
- Highest elevation: 245 m (804 ft)
- Lowest elevation: 116 m (381 ft)
- Population (2023): 150
  - Density: 28/km^{2} (73/sq mi)
- Time zone: UTC+01:00 (CET)
  - Summer (DST): UTC+02:00 (CEST)
- INSEE/Postal code: 89288 /89210
- ^{1} French Land Register data, which excludes lakes, ponds, glaciers > 1 km^{2} (0.386 sq mi or 247 acres) and river estuaries.

Paroy-en-Othe (French pronunciation: [paʁwa ɑ̃.n‿ɔt], lit. 'Paroy in Othe') is a commune in the Yonne department in Bourgogne-Franche-Comté in north-central France.

The commune of Paroy-en-Othe was part of Brienon-sur-Armançon between January 1, 1973 and December 31, 2003.

== See also ==
- Communes of the Yonne department
