= Malay-le-Grand =

- Commune
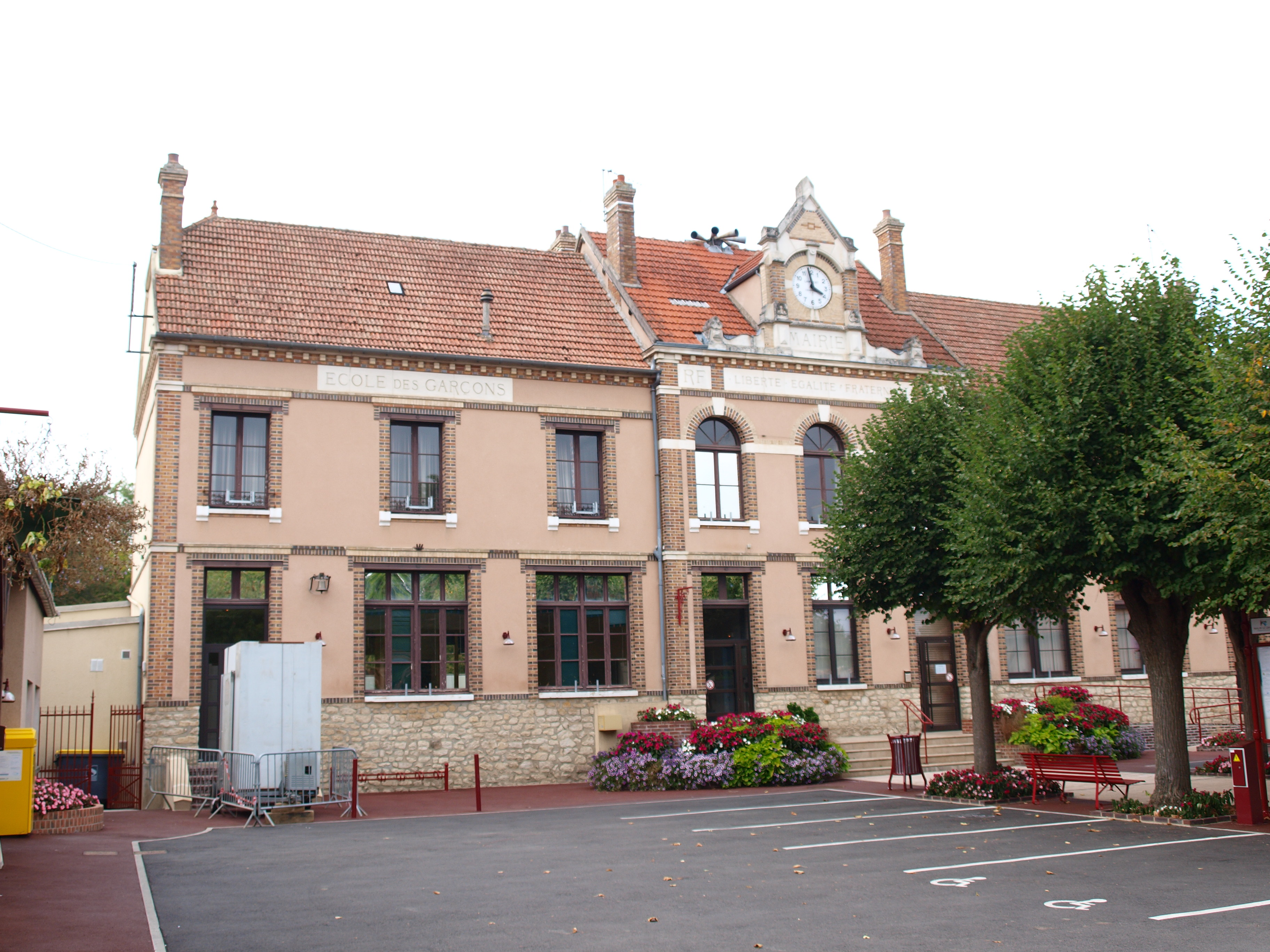
- The town hall in Malay-le-Grand
- Location of Malay-le-Grand
- Location within France Location within Bourgogne-Franche-Comté
- Coordinates: 48°10′32″N 3°20′31″E
- Country: France
- Region: Bourgogne-Franche-Comté
- Department: Yonne
- Arrondissement: Sens
- Canton: Sens-2
- Intercommunality: CA Grand Sénonais

Government
  - Mayor (2020–2026): Séverine Mainvis
- Area^{1}: 21.80 km^{2} (8.42 sq mi)
- Highest elevation: 221 m (725 ft)
- Lowest elevation: 76 m (249 ft)
- Population (2023): 1,630
  - Density: 74.8/km^{2} (194/sq mi)
- Time zone: UTC+01:00 (CET)
  - Summer (DST): UTC+02:00 (CEST)
- INSEE/Postal code: 89239 /89100
- ^{1} French Land Register data, which excludes lakes, ponds, glaciers > 1 km^{2} (0.386 sq mi or 247 acres) and river estuaries.

Malay-le-Grand (French pronunciation: [malɛ lə ɡʁɑ̃]) is a commune in the Yonne department in Bourgogne-Franche-Comté in north-central France.

== Etymology ==
The village Maslacius subterior was cited in 519. In 1003, the village is designated under the name Masliacus Major ("greater Malay"). In 1187, the name of Mâlay-le-Grand became Malaium Vice-comitis (Mâlay-le-Vicomte) until the French Revolution. It was only then that Mâlay-le-Vicomte became Mâlay-le-Grand again and the neighbouring village of Mâlay-le-Roi also became Malay-le-Petit.

== See also ==
- Communes of the Yonne department
