= Noé, Yonne =

Noé
- Commune
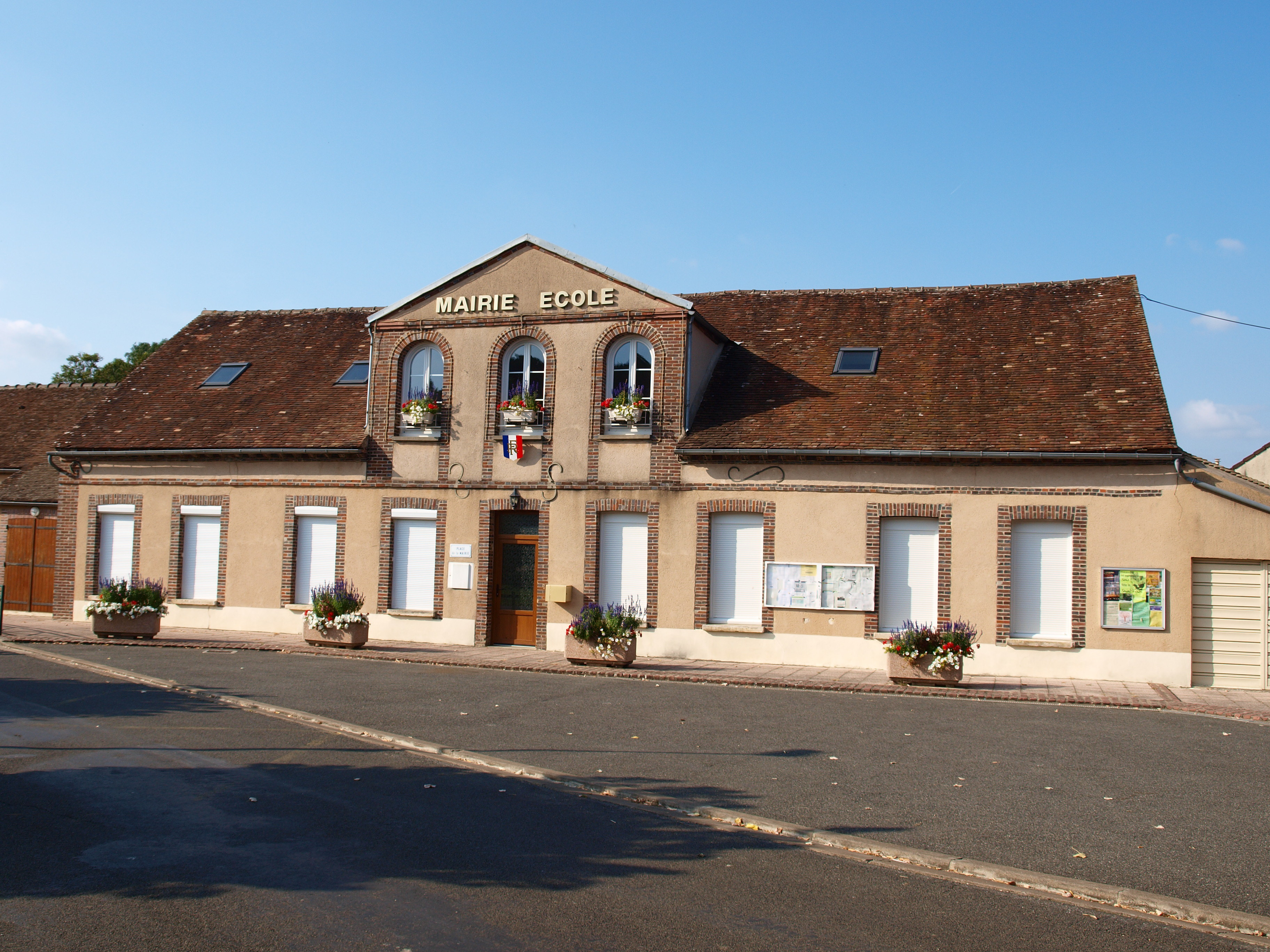
- The town hall in Noé
- Location of Noé
- Location within France Location within Bourgogne-Franche-Comté
- Coordinates: 48°09′52″N 3°24′12″E
- Country: France
- Region: Bourgogne-Franche-Comté
- Department: Yonne
- Arrondissement: Sens
- Canton: Brienon-sur-Armançon
- Intercommunality: CA Grand Sénonais

Government
  - Mayor (2020–2026): Jacques Fouquart
- Area^{1}: 8.55 km^{2} (3.30 sq mi)
- Highest elevation: 222 m (728 ft)
- Lowest elevation: 82 m (269 ft)
- Population (2023): 559
  - Density: 65.4/km^{2} (169/sq mi)
- Time zone: UTC+01:00 (CET)
  - Summer (DST): UTC+02:00 (CEST)
- INSEE/Postal code: 89278 /89320
- ^{1} French Land Register data, which excludes lakes, ponds, glaciers > 1 km^{2} (0.386 sq mi or 247 acres) and river estuaries.

Noé (French pronunciation: [nɔe]) is a commune in the Yonne department in Bourgogne-Franche-Comté in north-central France.

== See also ==
- Communes of the Yonne department
