= Villechétive =

- Commune
- Location of Villechétive
- Location within France Location within Bourgogne-Franche-Comté
- Coordinates: 48°05′45″N 3°30′43″E
- Country: France
- Region: Bourgogne-Franche-Comté
- Department: Yonne
- Arrondissement: Sens
- Canton: Brienon-sur-Armançon

Government
  - Mayor (2020–2026): Nicole Vié
- Area^{1}: 9.42 km^{2} (3.64 sq mi)
- Highest elevation: 258 m (846 ft)
- Lowest elevation: 178 m (584 ft)
- Population (2023): 260
  - Density: 28/km^{2} (71/sq mi)
- Time zone: UTC+01:00 (CET)
  - Summer (DST): UTC+02:00 (CEST)
- INSEE/Postal code: 89451 /89320
- ^{1} French Land Register data, which excludes lakes, ponds, glaciers > 1 km^{2} (0.386 sq mi or 247 acres) and river estuaries.

Villechétive (French pronunciation: [vilʃetiv]) is a commune in the Yonne department in Bourgogne-Franche-Comté in north-central France.

== See also ==
- Communes of the Yonne department
