= Vaudeurs =

- Commune
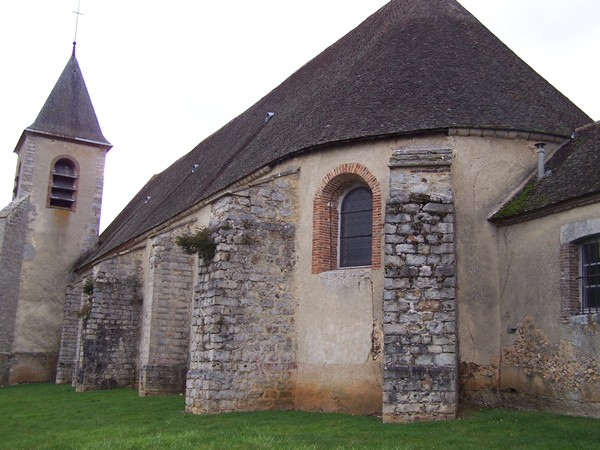
- The church in Vaudeurs
- Location of Vaudeurs
- Location within France Location within Bourgogne-Franche-Comté
- Coordinates: 48°08′03″N 3°33′05″E
- Country: France
- Region: Bourgogne-Franche-Comté
- Department: Yonne
- Arrondissement: Sens
- Canton: Brienon-sur-Armançon

Government
  - Mayor (2023–2026): Jacques Herlaut
- Area^{1}: 27.45 km^{2} (10.60 sq mi)
- Highest elevation: 259 m (850 ft)
- Lowest elevation: 132 m (433 ft)
- Population (2023): 469
  - Density: 17.1/km^{2} (44.3/sq mi)
- Time zone: UTC+01:00 (CET)
  - Summer (DST): UTC+02:00 (CEST)
- INSEE/Postal code: 89432 /89320
- ^{1} French Land Register data, which excludes lakes, ponds, glaciers > 1 km^{2} (0.386 sq mi or 247 acres) and river estuaries.

Vaudeurs (French pronunciation: [vodœʁ]) is a commune in the Yonne department in Bourgogne-Franche-Comté in north-central France.

== See also ==
- Communes of the Yonne department
