= Arrondissement of Sens =

Coordinates: 48°14′51″N 3°17′16″E

Sens
- Arrondissement
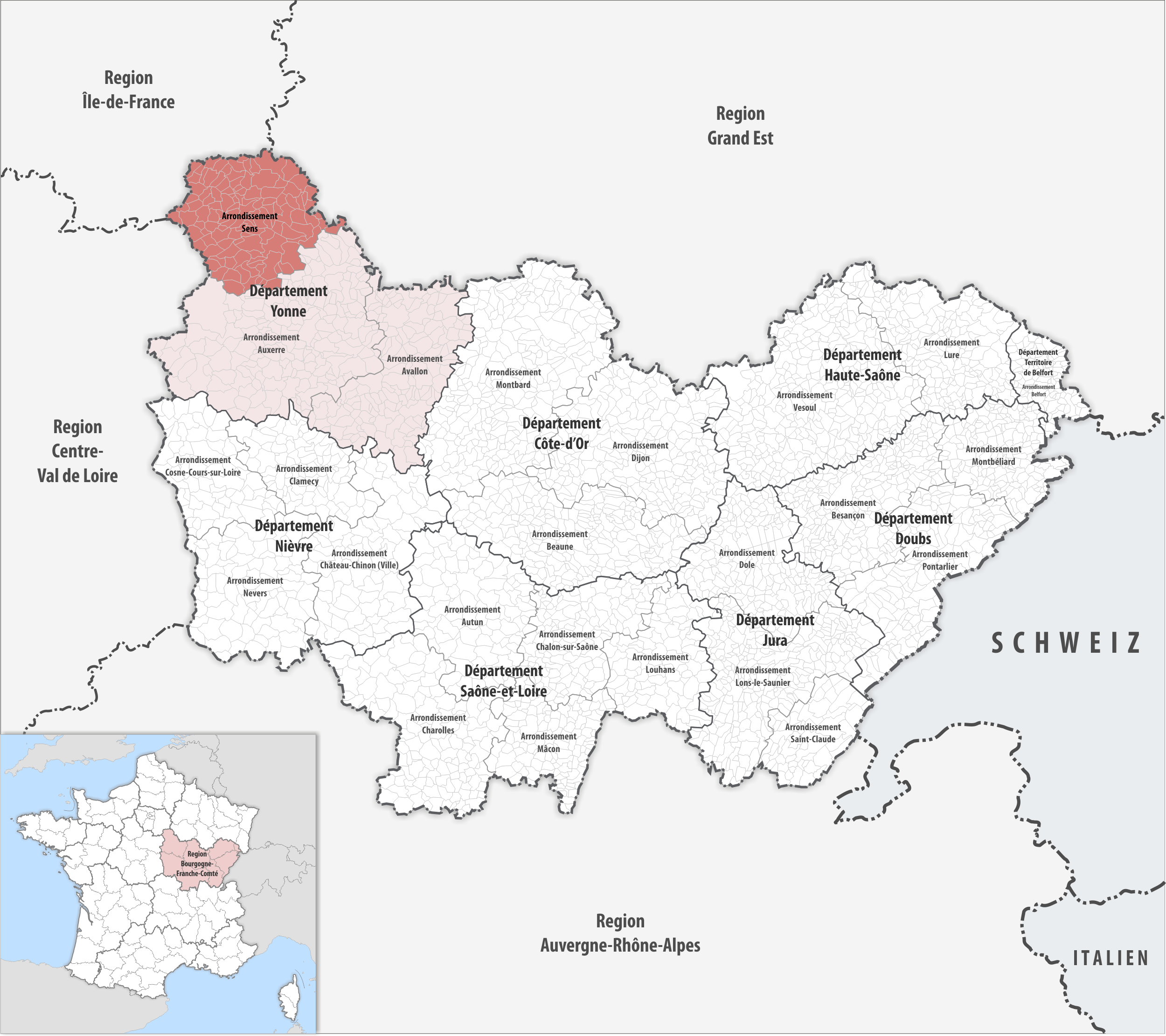
- Location within the region Bourgogne-Franche-Comté
- Country: France
- Region: Bourgogne-Franche-Comté
- Department: Yonne
- No. of communes: {{{nbcomm}}}
- Area: 1,916.8 km^{2} (740.1 sq mi)
- Population (2023): 130,801
  - Density: 68.239/km^{2} (176.74/sq mi)
- INSEE code: 893

The Arrondissement of Sens is an arrondissement of France in the Yonne department in the Bourgogne-Franche-Comté region. It has 118 communes. Its population is 130,677 (2021), and its area is 1,916.8 km^{2} (740.1 sq mi).

== Composition ==
The communes of the arrondissement of Sens, and their INSEE codes, are:

1. Arces-Dilo (89014)
2. Armeau (89018)
3. Bagneaux (89027)
4. La Belliole (89036)
5. Béon (89037)
6. Bœurs-en-Othe (89048)
7. Les Bordes (89051)
8. Brannay (89054)
9. Brion (89056)
10. Bussy-en-Othe (89059)
11. Bussy-le-Repos (89060)
12. La Celle-Saint-Cyr (89063)
13. Cérilly (89065)
14. Cerisiers (89066)
15. Cézy (89067)
16. Champigny (89074)
17. Champlay (89075)
18. Chamvres (89079)
19. La Chapelle-sur-Oreuse (89080)
20. Chaumont (89093)
21. Chaumot (89094)
22. Chéroy (89100)
23. Les Clérimois (89111)
24. Collemiers (89113)
25. Compigny (89115)
26. Cornant (89116)
27. Coulours (89120)
28. Courgenay (89122)
29. Courlon-sur-Yonne (89124)
30. Courtoin (89126)
31. Courtois-sur-Yonne (89127)
32. Cudot (89133)
33. Cuy (89136)
34. Dixmont (89142)
35. Dollot (89143)
36. Domats (89144)
37. Égriselles-le-Bocage (89151)
38. Étigny (89160)
39. Évry (89162)
40. Flacy (89165)
41. Foissy-sur-Vanne (89171)
42. Fontaine-la-Gaillarde (89172)
43. Fouchères (89180)
44. Fournaudin (89181)
45. Gisy-les-Nobles (89189)
46. Gron (89195)
47. Joigny (89206)
48. Jouy (89209)
49. Lailly (89214)
50. Les Sièges (89395)
51. Lixy (89229)
52. Looze (89230)
53. Maillot (89236)
54. Malay-le-Grand (89239)
55. Malay-le-Petit (89240)
56. Marsangy (89245)
57. Michery (89255)
58. Molinons (89261)
59. Montacher-Villegardin (89264)
60. Nailly (89274)
61. Noé (89278)
62. Pailly (89285)
63. Paron (89287)
64. Paroy-sur-Tholon (89289)
65. Passy (89291)
66. Perceneige (89469)
67. Piffonds (89298)
68. Plessis-Saint-Jean (89302)
69. Pont-sur-Vanne (89308)
70. Pont-sur-Yonne (89309)
71. La Postolle (89310)
72. Précy-sur-Vrin (89313)
73. Rosoy (89326)
74. Rousson (89327)
75. Saint-Agnan (89332)
76. Saint-Aubin-sur-Yonne (89335)
77. Saint-Clément (89338)
78. Saint-Denis-lès-Sens (89342)
79. Saint-Julien-du-Sault (89348)
80. Saint-Loup-d'Ordon (89350)
81. Saint-Martin-d'Ordon (89353)
82. Saint-Martin-du-Tertre (89354)
83. Saint-Maurice-aux-Riches-Hommes (89359)
84. Saint-Sérotin (89369)
85. Saint-Valérien (89370)
86. Saligny (89373)
87. Savigny-sur-Clairis (89380)
88. Sens (89387)
89. Sépeaux-Saint-Romain (89388)
90. Serbonnes (89390)
91. Sergines (89391)
92. Soucy (89399)
93. Subligny (89404)
94. Thorigny-sur-Oreuse (89414)
95. Les Vallées-de-la-Vanne (89411)
96. Vallery (89428)
97. Vaudeurs (89432)
98. Vaumort (89434)
99. Verlin (89440)
100. Vernoy (89442)
101. Véron (89443)
102. Villeblevin (89449)
103. Villebougis (89450)
104. Villechétive (89451)
105. Villecien (89452)
106. Villemanoche (89456)
107. Villenavotte (89458)
108. Villeneuve-l'Archevêque (89461)
109. Villeneuve-la-Dondagre (89459)
110. Villeneuve-la-Guyard (89460)
111. Villeneuve-sur-Yonne (89464)
112. Villeperrot (89465)
113. Villeroy (89466)
114. Villethierry (89467)
115. Villevallier (89468)
116. Villiers-Louis (89471)
117. Vinneuf (89480)
118. Voisines (89483)

== History ==
The arrondissement of Sens was created in 1800. In 1926 it was expanded with part of the former arrondissement of Joigny (the former cantons of Cerisiers, Saint-Julien-du-Sault and Villeneuve-sur-Yonne). In August 1973 the cantons of Sens-Nord-Est, Sens-Ouest and Sens-Sud-Est were created from the former cantons of Sens-Nord and Sens-Sud. At the January 2017 reorganisation of the arrondissements of Yonne, it received 12 communes from the arrondissement of Auxerre.

As a result of the reorganisation of the cantons of France which came into effect in 2015, the borders of the cantons are no longer related to the borders of the arrondissements. The cantons of the arrondissement of Auxerre were, as of January 2015:

1. Cerisiers
2. Chéroy
3. Pont-sur-Yonne
4. Saint-Julien-du-Sault
5. Sens-Nord-Est
6. Sens-Ouest
7. Sens-Sud-Est
8. Sergines
9. Villeneuve-l'Archevêque
10. Villeneuve-sur-Yonne
