= Cérilly, Yonne =

Cérilly
- Commune
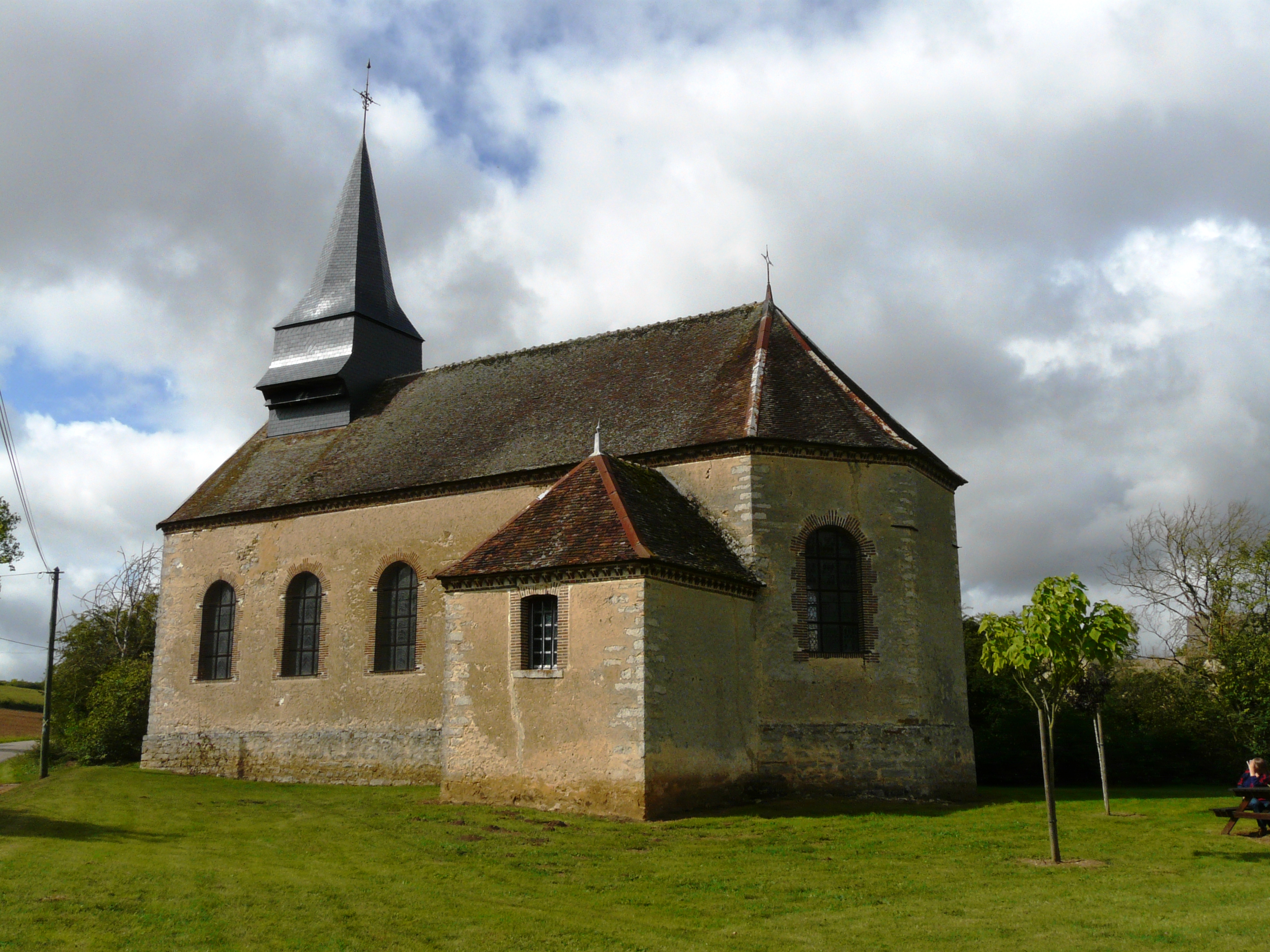
- The church in Cérilly
- Location of Cérilly
- Location within France Location within Bourgogne-Franche-Comté
- Coordinates: 48°10′59″N 3°37′24″E
- Country: France
- Region: Bourgogne-Franche-Comté
- Department: Yonne
- Arrondissement: Sens
- Canton: Brienon-sur-Armançon

Government
  - Mayor (2020–2026): Edith Vallée
- Area^{1}: 7.29 km^{2} (2.81 sq mi)
- Highest elevation: 238 m (781 ft)
- Lowest elevation: 134 m (440 ft)
- Population (2023): 51
  - Density: 7.0/km^{2} (18/sq mi)
- Time zone: UTC+01:00 (CET)
  - Summer (DST): UTC+02:00 (CEST)
- INSEE/Postal code: 89065 /89320
- ^{1} French Land Register data, which excludes lakes, ponds, glaciers > 1 km^{2} (0.386 sq mi or 247 acres) and river estuaries.

Cérilly (French pronunciation: [seʁiji]) is a commune in the Yonne department in Bourgogne-Franche-Comté in north-central France.

== See also ==
- Communes of the Yonne department
