= Mercy, Yonne =

Mercy
- Commune
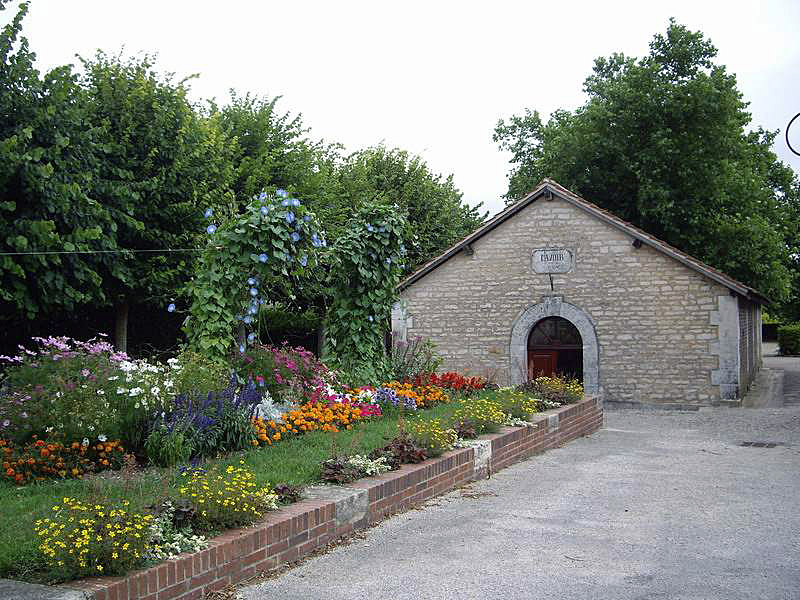
- Location of Mercy
- Location within France Location within Bourgogne-Franche-Comté
- Coordinates: 48°01′53″N 3°37′52″E
- Country: France
- Region: Bourgogne-Franche-Comté
- Department: Yonne
- Arrondissement: Auxerre
- Canton: Brienon-sur-Armançon

Government
  - Mayor (2020–2026): Jean-Louis Leprun
- Area^{1}: 2.66 km^{2} (1.03 sq mi)
- Highest elevation: 168 m (551 ft)
- Lowest elevation: 117 m (384 ft)
- Population (2023): 77
  - Density: 29/km^{2} (75/sq mi)
- Time zone: UTC+01:00 (CET)
  - Summer (DST): UTC+02:00 (CEST)
- INSEE/Postal code: 89249 /89210
- ^{1} French Land Register data, which excludes lakes, ponds, glaciers > 1 km^{2} (0.386 sq mi or 247 acres) and river estuaries.

Mercy (French pronunciation: [mɛʁsi]) is a commune in the Yonne department in Bourgogne-Franche-Comté in north-central France.

== See also ==
- Communes of the Yonne department
