= Vaumort =

- Commune
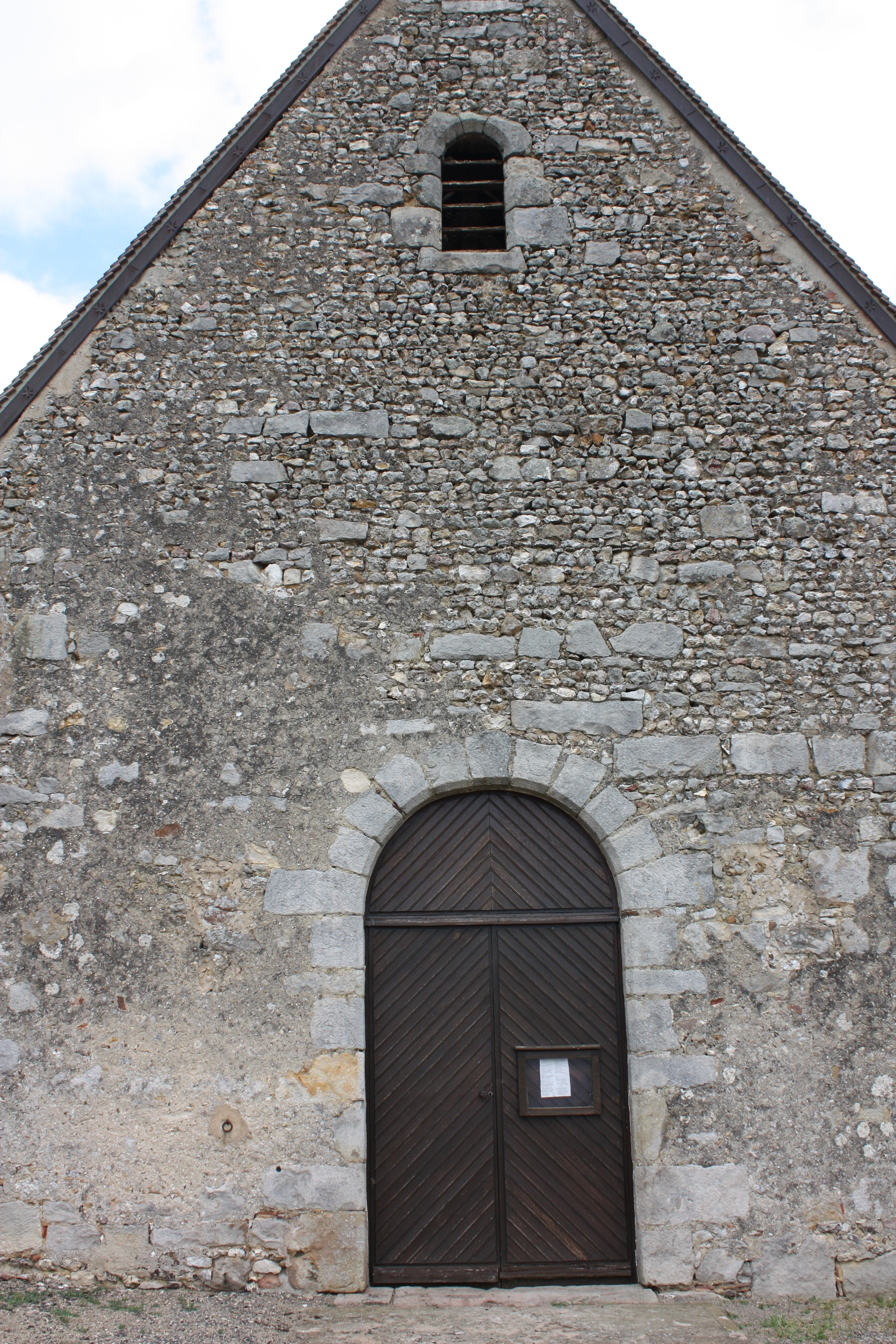
- The church in Vaumort
- Location of Vaumort
- Location within France Location within Bourgogne-Franche-Comté
- Coordinates: 48°09′19″N 3°26′24″E
- Country: France
- Region: Bourgogne-Franche-Comté
- Department: Yonne
- Arrondissement: Sens
- Canton: Brienon-sur-Armançon

Government
  - Mayor (2020–2026): Marie-José Roche
- Area^{1}: 14.52 km^{2} (5.61 sq mi)
- Highest elevation: 239 m (784 ft)
- Lowest elevation: 94 m (308 ft)
- Population (2023): 342
  - Density: 23.6/km^{2} (61.0/sq mi)
- Time zone: UTC+01:00 (CET)
  - Summer (DST): UTC+02:00 (CEST)
- INSEE/Postal code: 89434 /89320
- ^{1} French Land Register data, which excludes lakes, ponds, glaciers > 1 km^{2} (0.386 sq mi or 247 acres) and river estuaries.

Vaumort (French pronunciation: [vomɔʁ]) is a commune in the Yonne department in Bourgogne-Franche-Comté in north-central France.

== See also ==
- Communes of the Yonne department
