= Fournaudin =

- Commune
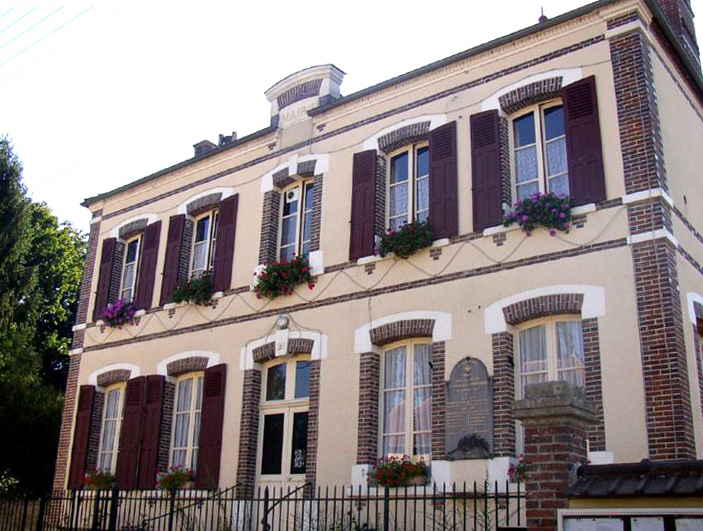
- The town hall in Fournaudin

- Coat of arms
- Location of Fournaudin
- Location within France Location within Bourgogne-Franche-Comté
- Coordinates: 48°09′15″N 3°38′28″E
- Country: France
- Region: Bourgogne-Franche-Comté
- Department: Yonne
- Arrondissement: Sens
- Canton: Brienon-sur-Armançon

Government
  - Mayor (2020–2026): Christophe Violette
- Area^{1}: 9.16 km^{2} (3.54 sq mi)
- Highest elevation: 254 m (833 ft)
- Lowest elevation: 155 m (509 ft)
- Population (2023): 136
  - Density: 14.8/km^{2} (38.5/sq mi)
- Time zone: UTC+01:00 (CET)
  - Summer (DST): UTC+02:00 (CEST)
- INSEE/Postal code: 89181 /89320
- ^{1} French Land Register data, which excludes lakes, ponds, glaciers > 1 km^{2} (0.386 sq mi or 247 acres) and river estuaries.

Fournaudin (French pronunciation: [fuʁnodɛ̃]) is a commune in the Yonne department in Bourgogne-Franche-Comté in north-central France.

== See also ==
- Communes of the Yonne department
