= Coulours =

- Commune
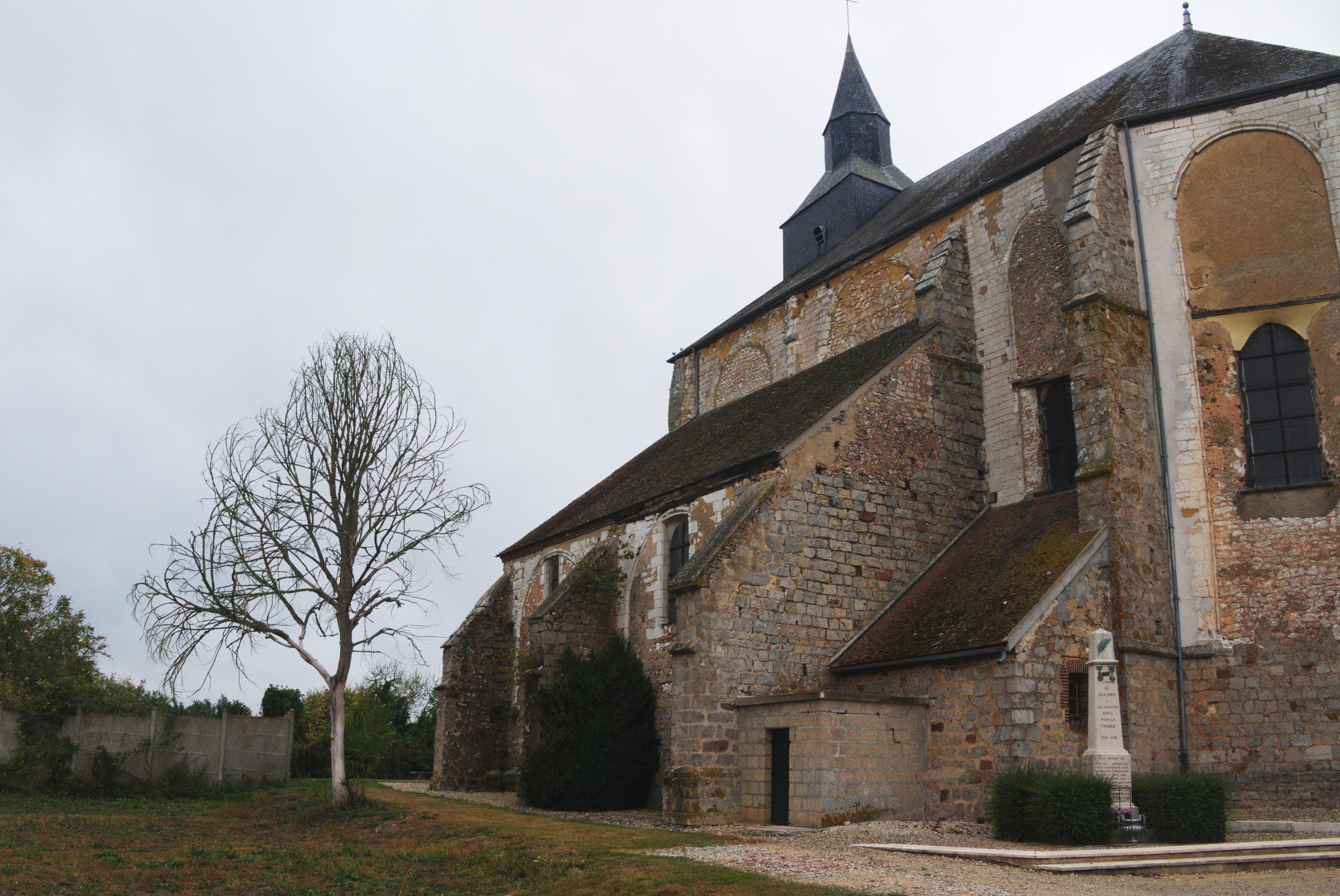
- The church in Coulours

- Coat of arms
- Location of Coulours
- Location within France Location within Bourgogne-Franche-Comté
- Coordinates: 48°09′54″N 3°35′15″E
- Country: France
- Region: Bourgogne-Franche-Comté
- Department: Yonne
- Arrondissement: Sens
- Canton: Brienon-sur-Armançon
- Area^{1}: 17.40 km^{2} (6.72 sq mi)
- Highest elevation: 253 m (830 ft)
- Lowest elevation: 160 m (520 ft)
- Population (2023): 141
  - Density: 8.10/km^{2} (21.0/sq mi)
- Time zone: UTC+01:00 (CET)
  - Summer (DST): UTC+02:00 (CEST)
- INSEE/Postal code: 89120 /89320
- ^{1} French Land Register data, which excludes lakes, ponds, glaciers > 1 km^{2} (0.386 sq mi or 247 acres) and river estuaries.

Coulours (French pronunciation: [kuluʁ]) is a commune in the Yonne department in Bourgogne-Franche-Comté in north-central France.

== Climate ==
Climate data for Coulours (1991–2006 averages)
Month	Jan	Feb	Mar	Apr	May	Jun	Jul	Aug	Sep	Oct	Nov	Dec	Year
Record high °C (°F)	15.6 (60.1)	20.5 (68.9)	22.9 (73.2)	26.9 (80.4)	30.5 (86.9)	36.1 (97.0)	37.2 (99.0)	39.8 (103.6)	32.4 (90.3)	26.8 (80.2)	20.4 (68.7)	16.8 (62.2)	39.8 (103.6)
Mean daily maximum °C (°F)	6.4 (43.5)	7.8 (46.0)	12.0 (53.6)	14.8 (58.6)	19.8 (67.6)	23.2 (73.8)	25.4 (77.7)	26.1 (79.0)	20.6 (69.1)	15.7 (60.3)	9.5 (49.1)	6.5 (43.7)	15.7 (60.3)
Daily mean °C (°F)	3.7 (38.7)	4.5 (40.1)	7.7 (45.9)	9.8 (49.6)	14.3 (57.7)	17.4 (63.3)	19.4 (66.9)	20.0 (68.0)	15.5 (59.9)	11.8 (53.2)	6.6 (43.9)	4.1 (39.4)	11.2 (52.2)
Mean daily minimum °C (°F)	1.0 (33.8)	1.3 (34.3)	3.3 (37.9)	4.9 (40.8)	8.7 (47.7)	11.5 (52.7)	13.4 (56.1)	13.8 (56.8)	10.5 (50.9)	7.8 (46.0)	3.7 (38.7)	1.7 (35.1)	6.8 (44.2)
Record low °C (°F)	−16.7 (1.9)	−11.3 (11.7)	−12.6 (9.3)	−5.1 (22.8)	−0.2 (31.6)	2.1 (35.8)	6.5 (43.7)	5.7 (42.3)	2.6 (36.7)	−4.2 (24.4)	−9.4 (15.1)	−13.8 (7.2)	−16.7 (1.9)
Average precipitation mm (inches)	66.1 (2.60)	61.3 (2.41)	57.2 (2.25)	60.4 (2.38)	69.0 (2.72)	63.1 (2.48)	58.8 (2.31)	60.6 (2.39)	61.1 (2.41)	77.5 (3.05)	72.4 (2.85)	78.5 (3.09)	786.0 (30.94)
Average precipitation days (≥ 1.0 mm)	12.3	11.3	10.4	9.8	10.3	9.2	8.4	8.2	8.8	11.2	11.8	13.0	124.6
Source: Meteociel

== See also ==
- Communes of the Yonne department
