= Cerisiers =

- Commune
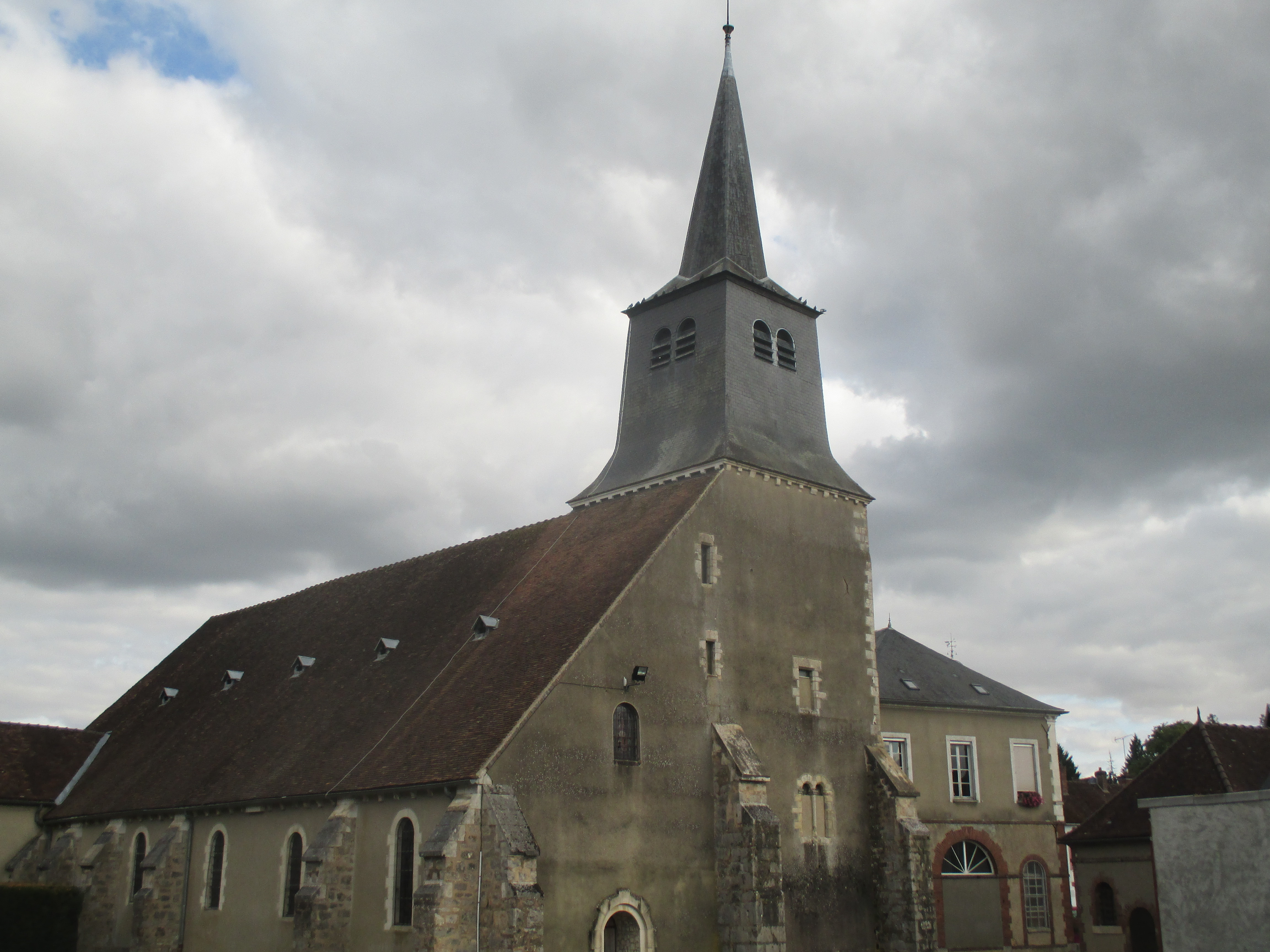
- The church in Cerisiers

- Coat of arms
- Location of Cerisiers
- Location within France Location within Bourgogne-Franche-Comté
- Coordinates: 48°08′03″N 3°29′08″E
- Country: France
- Region: Bourgogne-Franche-Comté
- Department: Yonne
- Arrondissement: Sens
- Canton: Brienon-sur-Armançon

Government
  - Mayor (2020–2026): Patrick Harper
- Area^{1}: 25.78 km^{2} (9.95 sq mi)
- Highest elevation: 247 m (810 ft)
- Lowest elevation: 119 m (390 ft)
- Population (2023): 988
  - Density: 38.3/km^{2} (99.3/sq mi)
- Time zone: UTC+01:00 (CET)
  - Summer (DST): UTC+02:00 (CEST)
- INSEE/Postal code: 89066 /89320
- ^{1} French Land Register data, which excludes lakes, ponds, glaciers > 1 km^{2} (0.386 sq mi or 247 acres) and river estuaries.

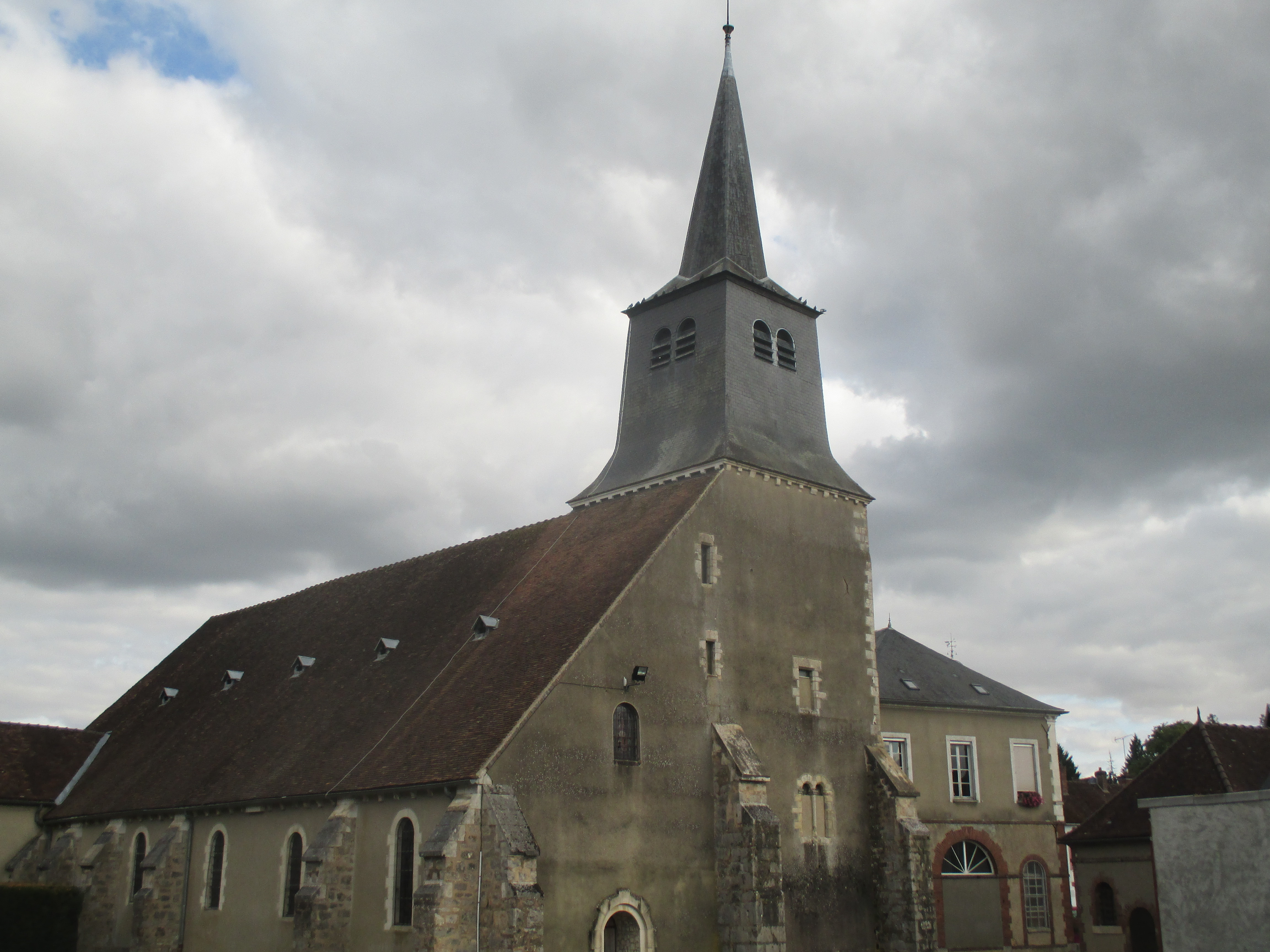
Church of Cerisiers.

Cerisiers (French pronunciation: [səʁizje]) is a commune in the Yonne department in Bourgogne-Franche-Comté in north-central France.

== See also ==
- Communes of the Yonne department
