= Bœurs-en-Othe =

- Commune
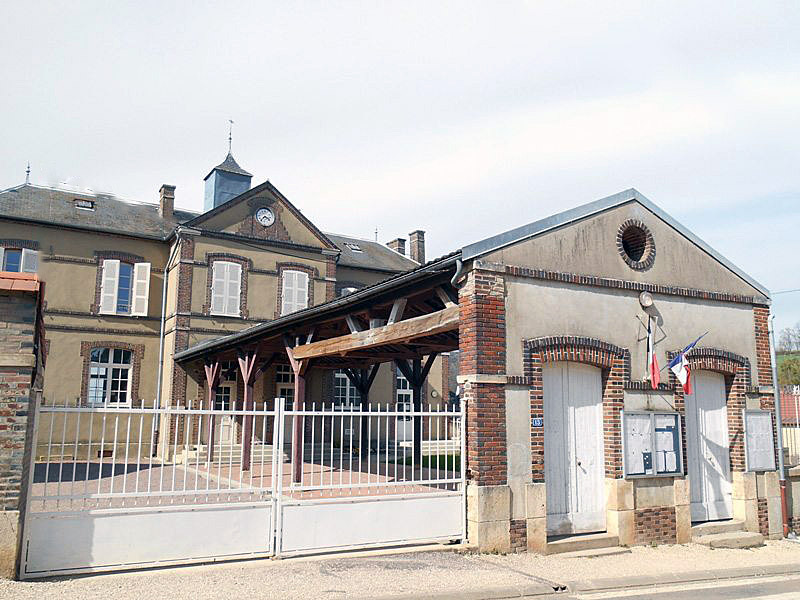
- Town hall
- Location of Bœurs-en-Othe
- Location within France Location within Bourgogne-Franche-Comté
- Coordinates: 48°08′20″N 3°42′23″E
- Country: France
- Region: Bourgogne-Franche-Comté
- Department: Yonne
- Arrondissement: Sens
- Canton: Brienon-sur-Armançon

Government
  - Mayor (2020–2026): Françoise Givaudin
- Area^{1}: 22.30 km^{2} (8.61 sq mi)
- Highest elevation: 271 m (889 ft)
- Lowest elevation: 170 m (560 ft)
- Population (2023): 334
  - Density: 15.0/km^{2} (38.8/sq mi)
- Time zone: UTC+01:00 (CET)
  - Summer (DST): UTC+02:00 (CEST)
- INSEE/Postal code: 89048 /89770
- ^{1} French Land Register data, which excludes lakes, ponds, glaciers > 1 km^{2} (0.386 sq mi or 247 acres) and river estuaries.

Bœurs-en-Othe (French pronunciation: [bœʁ ɑ̃.n‿ɔt], lit. 'Bœurs in Othe') is a commune in the Yonne department in Bourgogne-Franche-Comté in north-central France.

== See also ==
- Communes of the Yonne department
