= Esnon =

- Commune
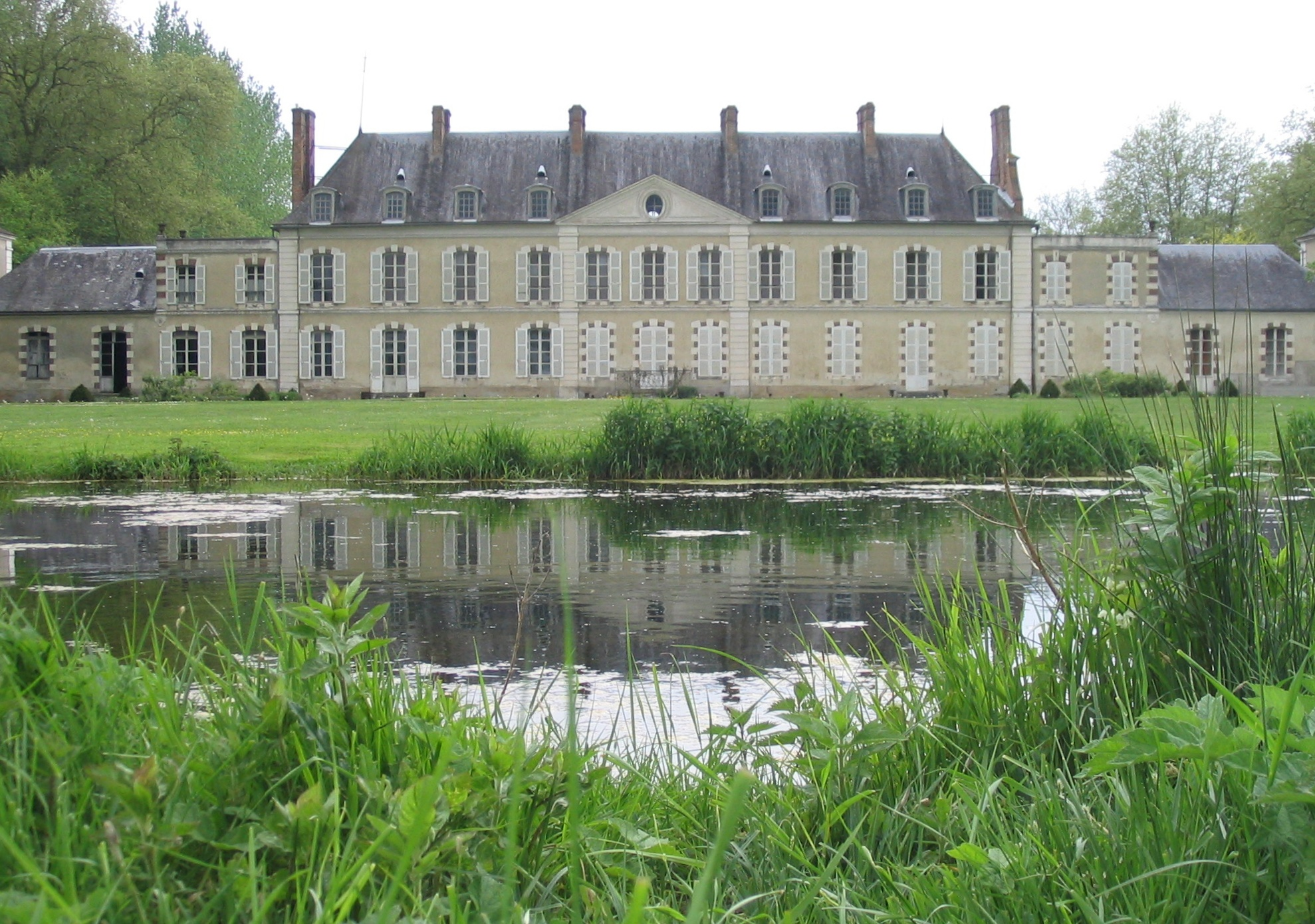
- The chateau in Esnon
- Location of Esnon
- Location within France Location within Bourgogne-Franche-Comté
- Coordinates: 47°59′05″N 3°34′36″E
- Country: France
- Region: Bourgogne-Franche-Comté
- Department: Yonne
- Arrondissement: Auxerre
- Canton: Brienon-sur-Armançon

Government
  - Mayor (2020–2026): Emmanuel Mativet
- Area^{1}: 12.05 km^{2} (4.65 sq mi)
- Highest elevation: 247 m (810 ft)
- Lowest elevation: 84 m (276 ft)
- Population (2023): 375
  - Density: 31.1/km^{2} (80.6/sq mi)
- Time zone: UTC+01:00 (CET)
  - Summer (DST): UTC+02:00 (CEST)
- INSEE/Postal code: 89156 /89210
- ^{1} French Land Register data, which excludes lakes, ponds, glaciers > 1 km^{2} (0.386 sq mi or 247 acres) and river estuaries.

Esnon (French pronunciation: [enɔ̃]) is a commune in the Yonne department in Bourgogne-Franche-Comté in north-central France.

== See also ==
- Communes of the Yonne department
