= Chigy =

- Part of Les Vallées de la Vanne
- Location of Chigy
- Location within France Location within Bourgogne-Franche-Comté
- Coordinates: 48°12′01″N 3°28′41″E
- Country: France
- Region: Bourgogne-Franche-Comté
- Department: Yonne
- Arrondissement: Sens
- Canton: Brienon-sur-Armançon
- Commune: Les Vallées de la Vanne
- Area^{1}: 11.76 km^{2} (4.54 sq mi)
- Highest elevation: 211 m (692 ft)
- Lowest elevation: 90 m (300 ft)
- Population (2022): 336
  - Density: 28.6/km^{2} (74.0/sq mi)
- Time zone: UTC+01:00 (CET)
  - Summer (DST): UTC+02:00 (CEST)
- Postal code: 89190
- ^{1} French Land Register data, which excludes lakes, ponds, glaciers > 1 km^{2} (0.386 sq mi or 247 acres) and river estuaries.

Chigy (French pronunciation: [ʃiʒi]) is a former commune in the Yonne department in Bourgogne-Franche-Comté in north-central France. On 1 January 2016, it was merged into the new commune of Les Vallées de la Vanne.

== See also ==
- Communes of the Yonne department
