= Arces-Dilo =

- Commune
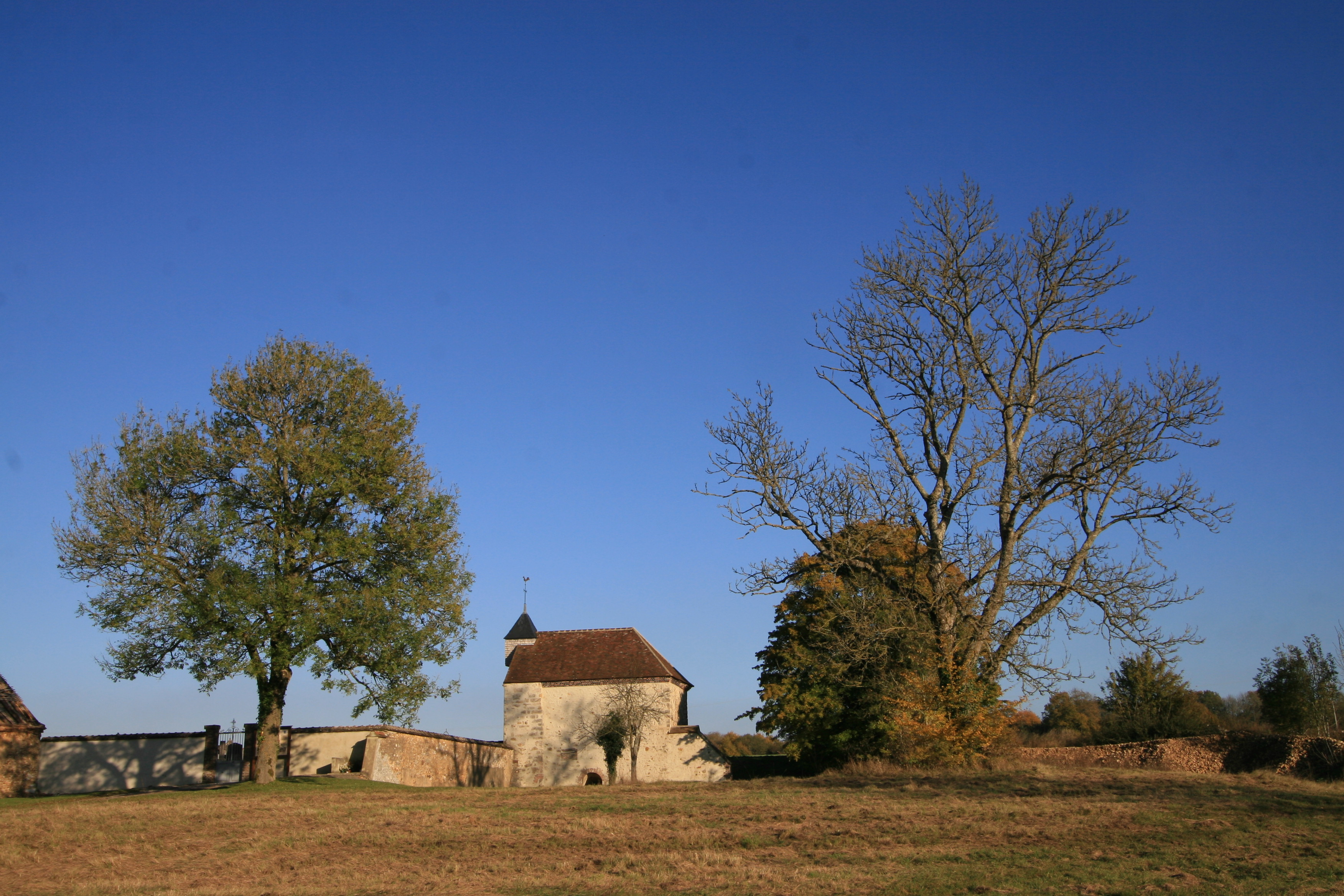
- The chapel of Saint Cartault in Dilo

- Coat of arms
- Location of Arces-Dilo
- Location within France Location within Bourgogne-Franche-Comté
- Coordinates: 48°05′30″N 3°35′54″E
- Country: France
- Region: Bourgogne-Franche-Comté
- Department: Yonne
- Arrondissement: Sens
- Canton: Brienon-sur-Armançon

Government
  - Mayor (2026–32): Annie Bakour
- Area^{1}: 27.02 km^{2} (10.43 sq mi)
- Highest elevation: 288 m (945 ft)
- Lowest elevation: 198 m (650 ft)
- Population (2023): 615
  - Density: 22.8/km^{2} (59.0/sq mi)
- Time zone: UTC+01:00 (CET)
  - Summer (DST): UTC+02:00 (CEST)
- INSEE/Postal code: 89014 /89320
- ^{1} French Land Register data, which excludes lakes, ponds, glaciers > 1 km^{2} (0.386 sq mi or 247 acres) and river estuaries.

Arces-Dilo (French pronunciation: [aʁs dilo]) is a commune in the Yonne department in Bourgogne-Franche-Comté in north-central France.

== Sights ==
The commune of Arces Dilo was formed in 1977 by the union of the former communes of Arces and Dilo.

=== Arces ===
- The eighteenth-century church of Saint-Michel, with a Tuscan vault and a tower in the style of Soufflot. The patron saints of the church are St. Ebbon and St. Michel.
- The Cross of St. Ebbon
- The Well of St. Ebbon, formerly believed to be able to cure fevers

=== Dilo ===
(Deilocus "a place dedicated to God")

Dilo owes originates from a Premonstratensian abbey (the Abbaye Notre-Dame de Dilo) founded in 1132 and enriched by many generous donations. The monks there developed iron and steel works. During his exile in France to Pontigny, Thomas Becket (called St. Thomas of Canterbury) stayed at Dilo, where he consecrated the church in 1168.

The Chapel of Saint-Cartault, blessed and dedicated to worship in 1692, in the oldest parish church.

== Personalities ==
- Odo of Villemaur
- Aelis Comtesse de Nevers (widow of the Comte de Joigny Renard IV). Buried in the abbey church of Dilo, his tomb is now in the church of Joigny.

== See also ==
- Communes of the Yonne department
