= Fontaine-la-Gaillarde =

- Commune
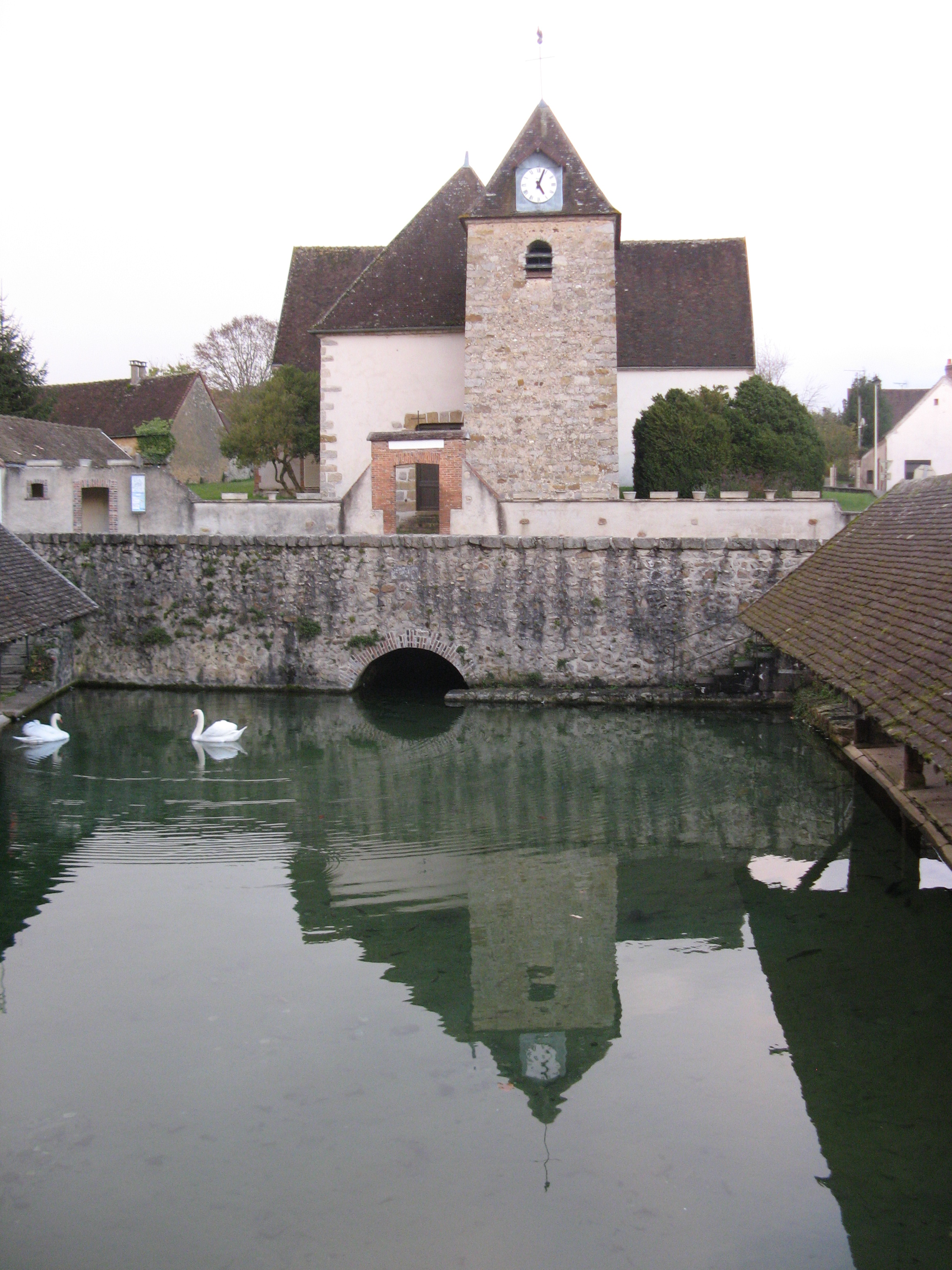
- The church in Fontaine-la-Gaillarde

- Coat of arms
- Location of Fontaine-la-Gaillarde
- Location within France Location within Bourgogne-Franche-Comté
- Coordinates: 48°13′13″N 3°22′51″E
- Country: France
- Region: Bourgogne-Franche-Comté
- Department: Yonne
- Arrondissement: Sens
- Canton: Brienon-sur-Armançon
- Intercommunality: CA Grand Sénonais

Government
  - Mayor (2020–2026): Michel Papinaud
- Area^{1}: 10.61 km^{2} (4.10 sq mi)
- Highest elevation: 234 m (768 ft)
- Lowest elevation: 111 m (364 ft)
- Population (2023): 526
  - Density: 49.6/km^{2} (128/sq mi)
- Time zone: UTC+01:00 (CET)
  - Summer (DST): UTC+02:00 (CEST)
- INSEE/Postal code: 89172 /89100
- ^{1} French Land Register data, which excludes lakes, ponds, glaciers > 1 km^{2} (0.386 sq mi or 247 acres) and river estuaries.

Fontaine-la-Gaillarde (French pronunciation: [fɔ̃tɛn la ɡajaʁd]) is a commune in the Yonne department in Bourgogne-Franche-Comté in north-central France.

== See also ==
- Communes of the Yonne department
