= Champlost =

- Commune
- Coat of arms
- Location of Champlost
- Location within France Location within Bourgogne-Franche-Comté
- Coordinates: 48°01′40″N 3°40′07″E
- Country: France
- Region: Bourgogne-Franche-Comté
- Department: Yonne
- Arrondissement: Auxerre
- Canton: Brienon-sur-Armançon

Government
  - Mayor (2020–2026): Jean-Louis Quéret
- Area^{1}: 22.94 km^{2} (8.86 sq mi)
- Highest elevation: 293 m (961 ft)
- Lowest elevation: 101 m (331 ft)
- Population (2023): 767
  - Density: 33.4/km^{2} (86.6/sq mi)
- Time zone: UTC+01:00 (CET)
  - Summer (DST): UTC+02:00 (CEST)
- INSEE/Postal code: 89076 /89210
- ^{1} French Land Register data, which excludes lakes, ponds, glaciers > 1 km^{2} (0.386 sq mi or 247 acres) and river estuaries.

Champlost (French pronunciation: [ʃɑ̃plo]) is a commune in the Yonne department in Bourgogne-Franche-Comté in north-central France.

== See also ==
- Communes of the Yonne department
