= Savigny-sur-Clairis =

- Commune
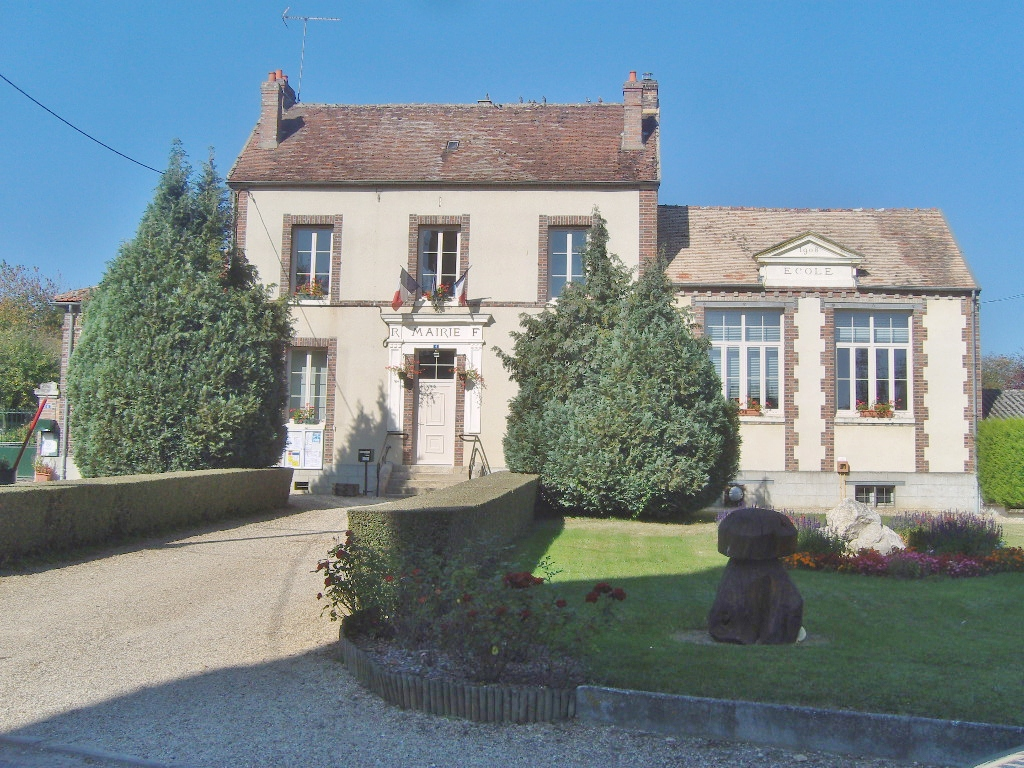
- The town hall in Savigny-sur-Clairis

- Coat of arms
- Location of Savigny-sur-Clairis
- Location within France Location within Bourgogne-Franche-Comté
- Coordinates: 48°04′32″N 3°05′38″E
- Country: France
- Region: Bourgogne-Franche-Comté
- Department: Yonne
- Arrondissement: Sens
- Canton: Gâtinais en Bourgogne

Government
  - Mayor (2020–2026): Louise Cartier
- Area^{1}: 16.44 km^{2} (6.35 sq mi)
- Highest elevation: 192 m (630 ft)
- Lowest elevation: 153 m (502 ft)
- Population (2023): 450
  - Density: 27/km^{2} (71/sq mi)
- Time zone: UTC+01:00 (CET)
  - Summer (DST): UTC+02:00 (CEST)
- INSEE/Postal code: 89380 /89150
- ^{1} French Land Register data, which excludes lakes, ponds, glaciers > 1 km^{2} (0.386 sq mi or 247 acres) and river estuaries.

Savigny-sur-Clairis (French pronunciation: [saviɲi syʁ klɛʁi]) is a commune in the Yonne department in Bourgogne-Franche-Comté in north-central France.

== See also ==
- Communes of the Yonne department
