= Vulaines =

Commune in Grand Est, France

- Commune
- Coat of arms
- Location of Vulaines
- Location within France Location within Grand Est
- Coordinates: 48°14′03″N 3°37′18″E
- Country: France
- Region: Grand Est
- Department: Aube
- Arrondissement: Troyes
- Canton: Aix-Villemaur-Pâlis
- Intercommunality: Pays d'Othe

Government
  - Mayor (2020–2026): Philippe Etcheto
- Area^{1}: 8.72 km^{2} (3.37 sq mi)
- Elevation: 112 m (367 ft)
- Population (2023): 226
  - Density: 25.9/km^{2} (67.1/sq mi)
- Time zone: UTC+01:00 (CET)
  - Summer (DST): UTC+02:00 (CEST)
- INSEE/Postal code: 10444 /10160
- ^{1} French Land Register data, which excludes lakes, ponds, glaciers > 1 km^{2} (0.386 sq mi or 247 acres) and river estuaries.

Vulaines (French pronunciation: [vylɛn]) is a commune in the Aube department in north-central France.

== Population ==
Historical population
Year	Pop.	±% p.a.
1968	245	—
1975	207	−2.38%
1982	171	−2.69%
1990	187	+1.12%
1999	212	+1.40%
2007	217	+0.29%
2012	234	+1.52%
2017	225	−0.78%
2023	226	+0.07%
Source: INSEE

== See also ==
- Communes of the Aube department
