= La Postolle =

- Commune
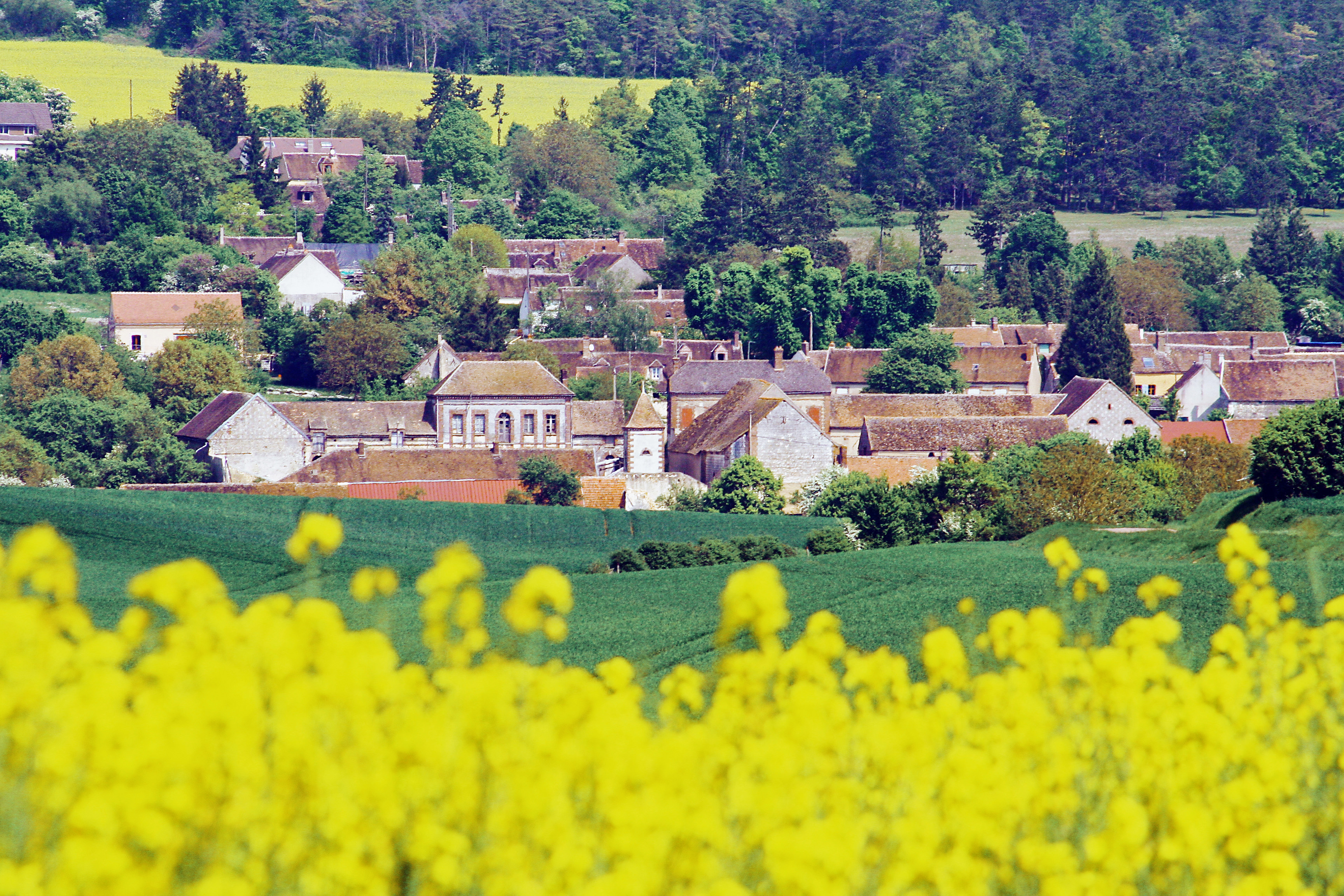
- A general view of La Postolle
- Location of La Postolle
- Location within France Location within Bourgogne-Franche-Comté
- Coordinates: 48°16′59″N 3°26′37″E
- Country: France
- Region: Bourgogne-Franche-Comté
- Department: Yonne
- Arrondissement: Sens
- Canton: Brienon-sur-Armançon

Government
  - Mayor (2025–2026): Françoise Defelice
- Area^{1}: 11.59 km^{2} (4.47 sq mi)
- Highest elevation: 227 m (745 ft)
- Lowest elevation: 123 m (404 ft)
- Population (2023): 159
  - Density: 13.7/km^{2} (35.5/sq mi)
- Time zone: UTC+01:00 (CET)
  - Summer (DST): UTC+02:00 (CEST)
- INSEE/Postal code: 89310 /89260
- ^{1} French Land Register data, which excludes lakes, ponds, glaciers > 1 km^{2} (0.386 sq mi or 247 acres) and river estuaries.

La Postolle (French pronunciation: [la pɔstɔl]) is a commune in the Yonne department in Bourgogne-Franche-Comté in north-central France.

== See also ==
- Communes of the Yonne department
