= Brienon-sur-Armançon =

- Commune
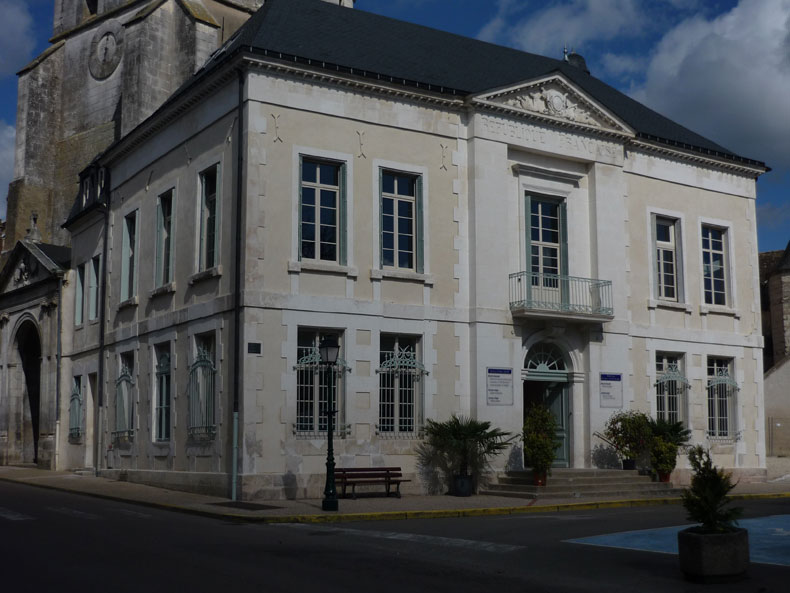
- The town hall in Brienon-sur-Armançon

- Coat of arms
- Location of Brienon-sur-Armançon
- Location within France Location within Bourgogne-Franche-Comté
- Coordinates: 47°59′37″N 3°37′02″E
- Country: France
- Region: Bourgogne-Franche-Comté
- Department: Yonne
- Arrondissement: Auxerre
- Canton: Brienon-sur-Armançon

Government
  - Mayor (2020–2026): Jean-Claude Carra
- Area^{1}: 31.19 km^{2} (12.04 sq mi)
- Highest elevation: 245 m (804 ft)
- Lowest elevation: 84 m (276 ft)
- Population (2023): 3,032
  - Density: 97.21/km^{2} (251.8/sq mi)
- Time zone: UTC+01:00 (CET)
  - Summer (DST): UTC+02:00 (CEST)
- INSEE/Postal code: 89055 /89210
- ^{1} French Land Register data, which excludes lakes, ponds, glaciers > 1 km^{2} (0.386 sq mi or 247 acres) and river estuaries.

Brienon-sur-Armançon (French pronunciation: [bʁijɛnɔ̃ syʁ aʁmɑ̃sɔ̃], literally Brienon on Armançon) is a commune in the Yonne department in Bourgogne-Franche-Comté in north-central France.

== Population ==
Historical population
| Year | Pop. | ±% p.a. |
|---|---|---|
| 1968 | 2,788 | — |
| 1975 | 3,035 | +1.22% |
| 1982 | 3,010 | −0.12% |
| 1990 | 2,934 | −0.32% |
| 1999 | 3,071 | +0.51% |
| 2007 | 3,151 | +0.32% |
| 2012 | 3,138 | −0.08% |
| 2017 | 3,176 | +0.24% |
| 2023 | 3,032 | −0.77% |
Source: INSEE

== See also ==
- Communes of the Yonne department
