= Saint-Maurice-aux-Riches-Hommes =

- Commune
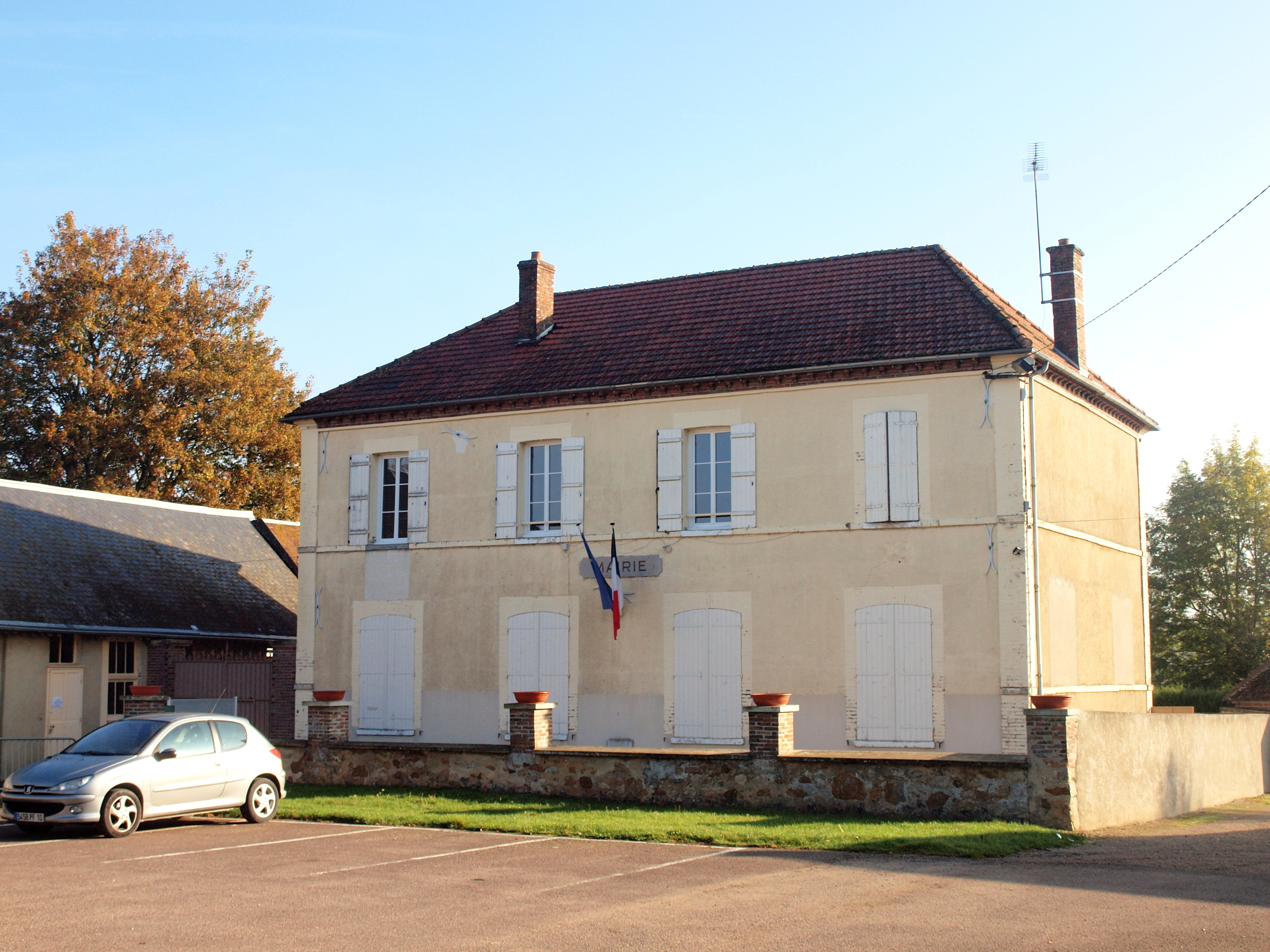
- The town hall in Saint-Maurice-aux-Riches-Hommes

- Coat of arms
- Location of Saint-Maurice-aux-Riches-Hommes
- Location within France Location within Bourgogne-Franche-Comté
- Coordinates: 48°21′05″N 3°30′52″E
- Country: France
- Region: Bourgogne-Franche-Comté
- Department: Yonne
- Arrondissement: Sens
- Canton: Brienon-sur-Armançon
- Area^{1}: 33.17 km^{2} (12.81 sq mi)
- Highest elevation: 226 m (741 ft)
- Lowest elevation: 101 m (331 ft)
- Population (2023): 407
  - Density: 12.3/km^{2} (31.8/sq mi)
- Time zone: UTC+01:00 (CET)
  - Summer (DST): UTC+02:00 (CEST)
- INSEE/Postal code: 89359 /89190
- ^{1} French Land Register data, which excludes lakes, ponds, glaciers > 1 km^{2} (0.386 sq mi or 247 acres) and river estuaries.

Saint-Maurice-aux-Riches-Hommes is a commune in the Yonne department in Bourgogne-Franche-Comté in north-central France.

== See also ==
- Communes of the Yonne department
