= Lailly =

- Commune
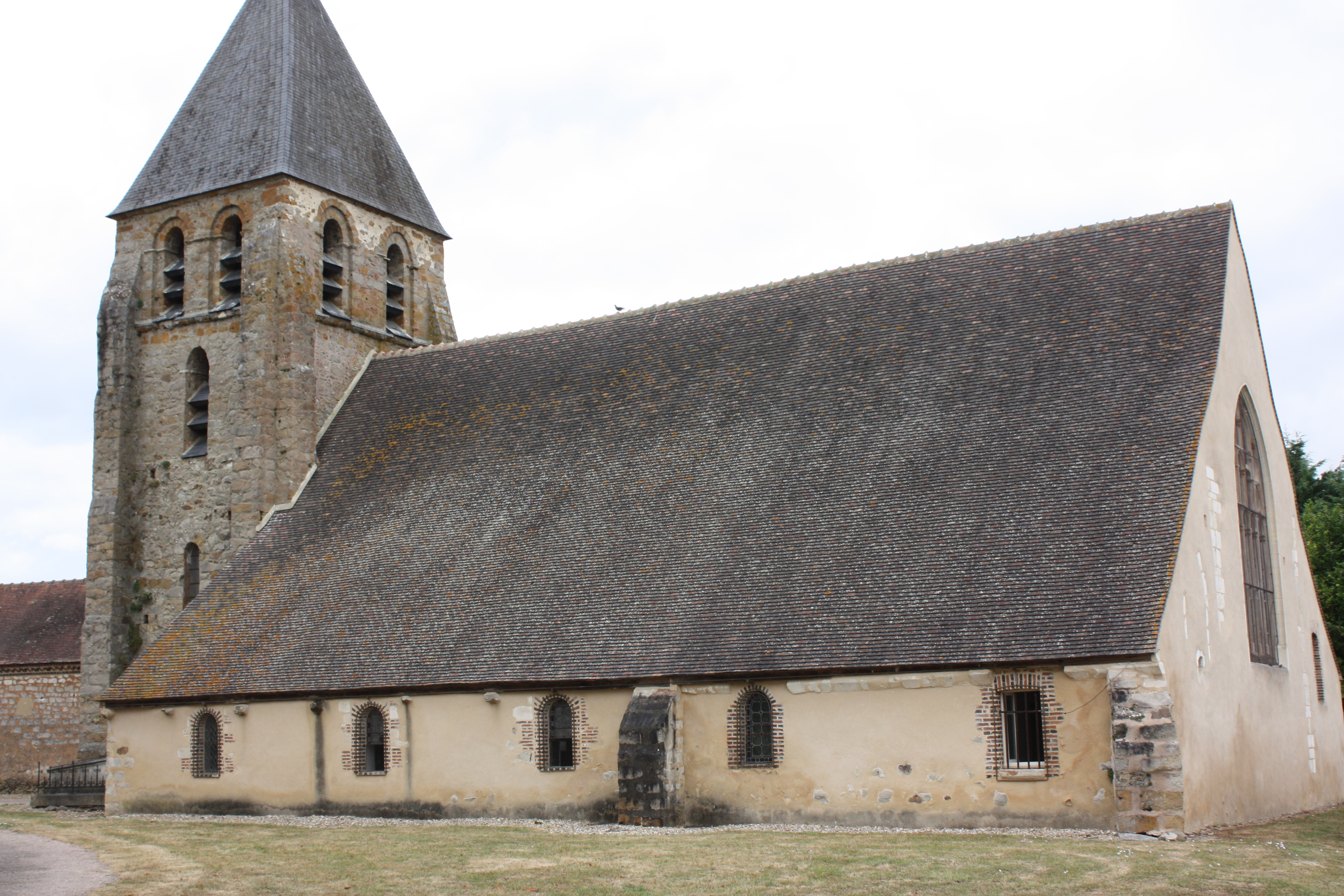
- The church in Lailly

- Coat of arms
- Location of Lailly
- Location within France Location within Bourgogne-Franche-Comté
- Coordinates: 48°14′39″N 3°31′52″E
- Country: France
- Region: Bourgogne-Franche-Comté
- Department: Yonne
- Arrondissement: Sens
- Canton: Brienon-sur-Armançon

Government
  - Mayor (2020–2026): Christiane Crosier
- Area^{1}: 22.48 km^{2} (8.68 sq mi)
- Highest elevation: 233 m (764 ft)
- Lowest elevation: 101 m (331 ft)
- Population (2023): 199
  - Density: 8.85/km^{2} (22.9/sq mi)
- Time zone: UTC+01:00 (CET)
  - Summer (DST): UTC+02:00 (CEST)
- INSEE/Postal code: 89214 /89190
- ^{1} French Land Register data, which excludes lakes, ponds, glaciers > 1 km^{2} (0.386 sq mi or 247 acres) and river estuaries.

Lailly (French pronunciation: [laji]) is a commune in the Yonne department in Bourgogne-Franche-Comté in north-central France.

== See also ==
- Communes of the Yonne department
