= Courgenay, Yonne =

Courgenay
- Commune
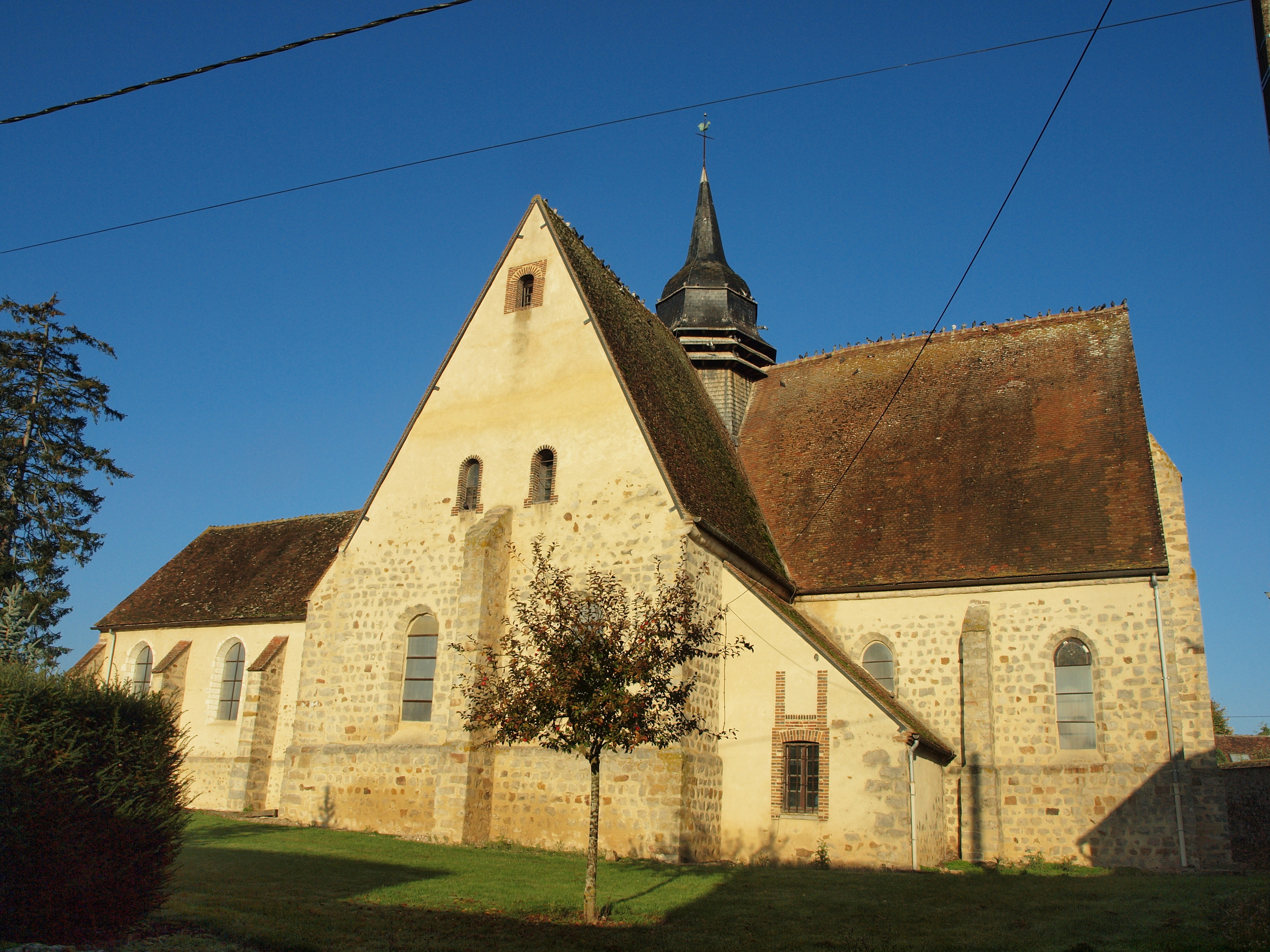
- The church in Courgenay
- Location of Courgenay
- Location within France Location within Bourgogne-Franche-Comté
- Coordinates: 48°17′14″N 3°32′56″E
- Country: France
- Region: Bourgogne-Franche-Comté
- Department: Yonne
- Arrondissement: Sens
- Canton: Brienon-sur-Armançon

Government
  - Mayor (2020–2026): Daniel Pagnier
- Area^{1}: 29.87 km^{2} (11.53 sq mi)
- Highest elevation: 240 m (790 ft)
- Lowest elevation: 110 m (360 ft)
- Population (2023): 564
  - Density: 18.9/km^{2} (48.9/sq mi)
- Time zone: UTC+01:00 (CET)
  - Summer (DST): UTC+02:00 (CEST)
- INSEE/Postal code: 89122 /89190
- ^{1} French Land Register data, which excludes lakes, ponds, glaciers > 1 km^{2} (0.386 sq mi or 247 acres) and river estuaries.

Courgenay (French pronunciation: [kuʁʒənɛ]) is a commune in the Yonne department in Bourgogne-Franche-Comté in north-central France. The former Vauluisant Abbey is situated in the commune.

== See also ==
- Communes of the Yonne department
