= Les Sièges =

- Commune
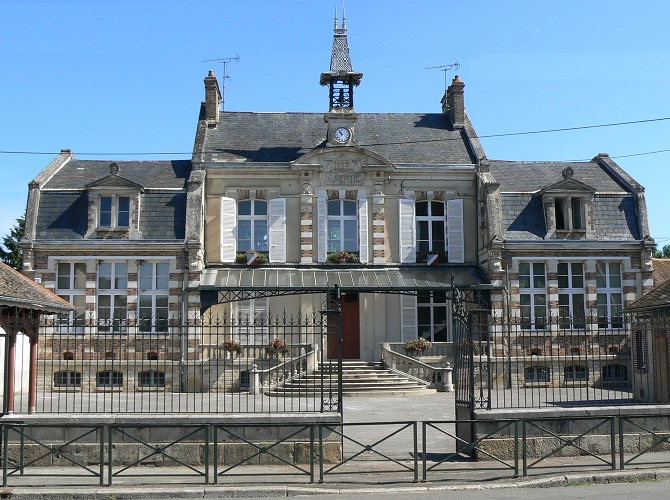
- The town hall in Les Sièges
- Location of Les Sièges
- Location within France Location within Bourgogne-Franche-Comté
- Coordinates: 48°10′51″N 3°31′10″E
- Country: France
- Region: Bourgogne-Franche-Comté
- Department: Yonne
- Arrondissement: Sens
- Canton: Brienon-sur-Armançon

Government
  - Mayor (2024–2026): Hervé Marandel
- Area^{1}: 23.59 km^{2} (9.11 sq mi)
- Highest elevation: 257 m (843 ft)
- Lowest elevation: 109 m (358 ft)
- Population (2023): 439
  - Density: 18.6/km^{2} (48.2/sq mi)
- Time zone: UTC+01:00 (CET)
  - Summer (DST): UTC+02:00 (CEST)
- INSEE/Postal code: 89395 /89190
- ^{1} French Land Register data, which excludes lakes, ponds, glaciers > 1 km^{2} (0.386 sq mi or 247 acres) and river estuaries.

Les Sièges (French pronunciation: [le sjɛʒ]) is a commune in the Yonne department in Bourgogne-Franche-Comté in north-central France.

== See also ==
- Communes of the Yonne department
