= Flacy =

- Commune
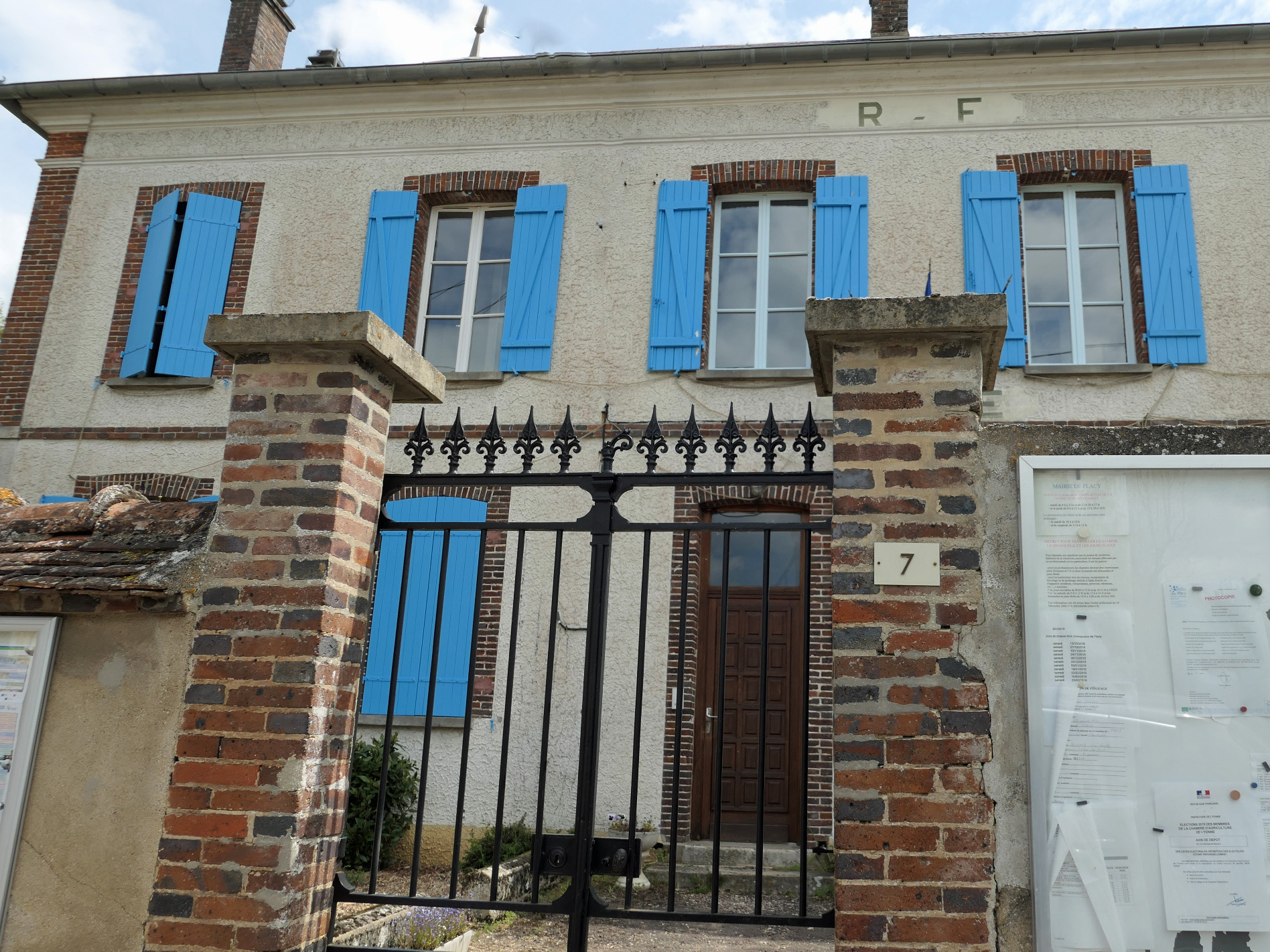
- Town hall
- Location of Flacy
- Location within France Location within Bourgogne-Franche-Comté
- Coordinates: 48°13′38″N 3°36′17″E
- Country: France
- Region: Bourgogne-Franche-Comté
- Department: Yonne
- Arrondissement: Sens
- Canton: Brienon-sur-Armançon

Government
  - Mayor (2020–2026): Claudine Pierre
- Area^{1}: 12.50 km^{2} (4.83 sq mi)
- Highest elevation: 232 m (761 ft)
- Lowest elevation: 105 m (344 ft)
- Population (2023): 123
  - Density: 9.84/km^{2} (25.5/sq mi)
- Time zone: UTC+01:00 (CET)
  - Summer (DST): UTC+02:00 (CEST)
- INSEE/Postal code: 89165 /89190
- ^{1} French Land Register data, which excludes lakes, ponds, glaciers > 1 km^{2} (0.386 sq mi or 247 acres) and river estuaries.

Flacy (French pronunciation: [flasi]) is a commune in the Yonne department in Bourgogne-Franche-Comté in north-central France.

== See also ==
- Communes of the Yonne department
