= Les Clérimois =

- Commune
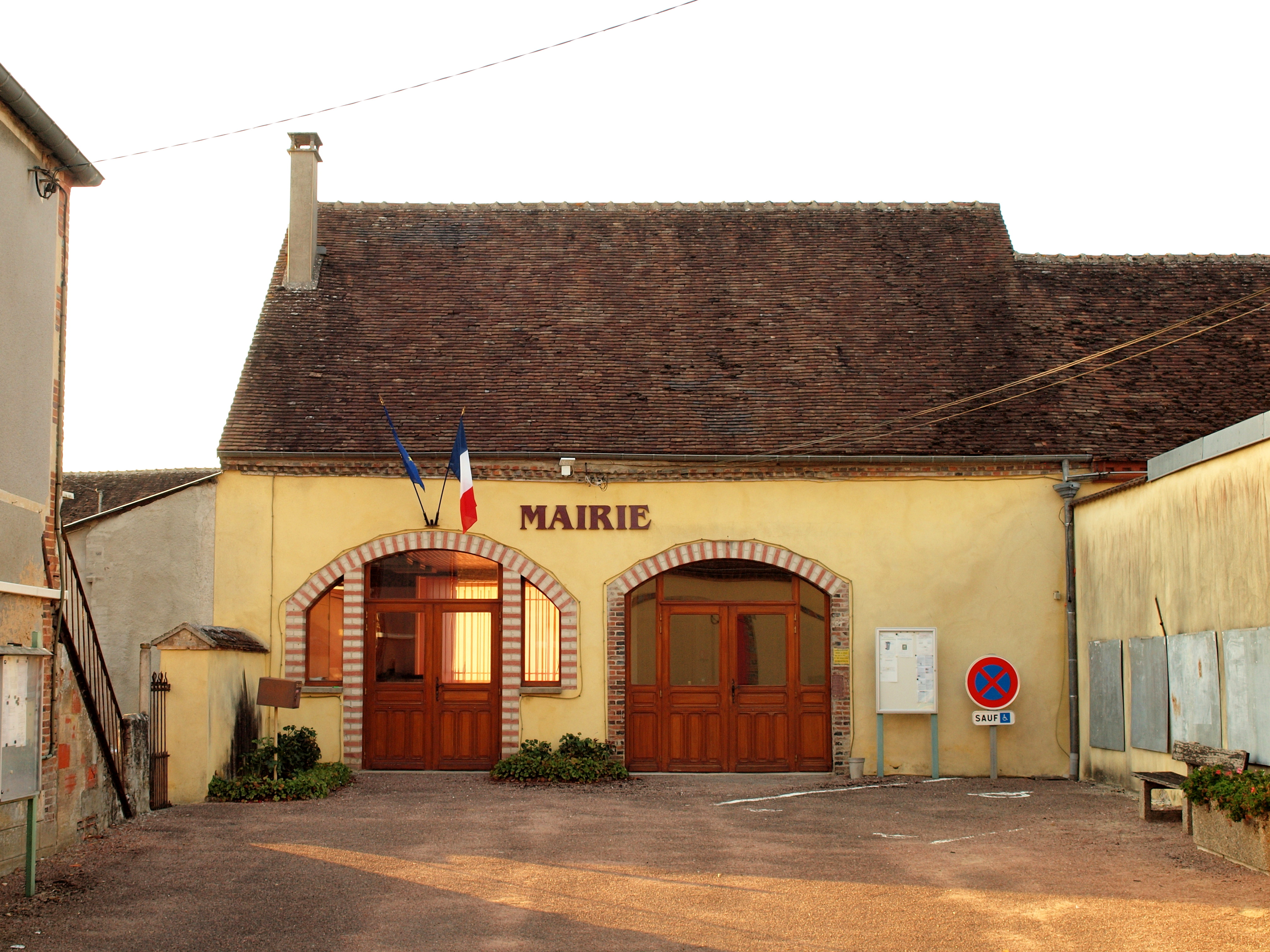
- The town hall in Les Clérimois
- Location of Les Clérimois
- Location within France Location within Bourgogne-Franche-Comté
- Coordinates: 48°13′44″N 3°26′30″E
- Country: France
- Region: Bourgogne-Franche-Comté
- Department: Yonne
- Arrondissement: Sens
- Canton: Brienon-sur-Armançon

Government
  - Mayor (2020–2026): Isabelle Poulin
- Area^{1}: 12.61 km^{2} (4.87 sq mi)
- Highest elevation: 236 m (774 ft)
- Lowest elevation: 110 m (360 ft)
- Population (2023): 298
  - Density: 23.6/km^{2} (61.2/sq mi)
- Time zone: UTC+01:00 (CET)
  - Summer (DST): UTC+02:00 (CEST)
- INSEE/Postal code: 89111 /89190
- ^{1} French Land Register data, which excludes lakes, ponds, glaciers > 1 km^{2} (0.386 sq mi or 247 acres) and river estuaries.

Les Clérimois (French pronunciation: [le kleʁimwa]) is a commune in the Yonne department in Bourgogne-Franche-Comté in north-central France.

== See also ==
- Communes of the Yonne department
