= Canton of Brienon-sur-Armançon =

Coordinates: 47.99°N 3.62°E

The canton of Brienon-sur-Armançon is an administrative division of the Yonne department, central France. Its borders were modified at the French canton reorganisation which came into effect in March 2015. Its seat is in Brienon-sur-Armançon.

It consists of the following communes:

1. Arces-Dilo
2. Bagneaux
3. Bellechaume
4. Bœurs-en-Othe
5. Brienon-sur-Armançon
6. Cérilly
7. Cerisiers
8. Champlost
9. Les Clérimois
10. Coulours
11. Courgenay
12. Esnon
13. Flacy
14. Foissy-sur-Vanne
15. Fontaine-la-Gaillarde
16. Fournaudin
17. Lailly
18. Malay-le-Petit
19. Mercy
20. Molinons
21. Noé
22. Paroy-en-Othe
23. Pont-sur-Vanne
24. La Postolle
25. Saint-Maurice-aux-Riches-Hommes
26. Saligny
27. Les Sièges
28. Les Vallées-de-la-Vanne
29. Vaudeurs
30. Vaumort
31. Venizy
32. Villechétive
33. Villeneuve-l'Archevêque
34. Villiers-Louis
