= Villiers-Louis =

- Commune
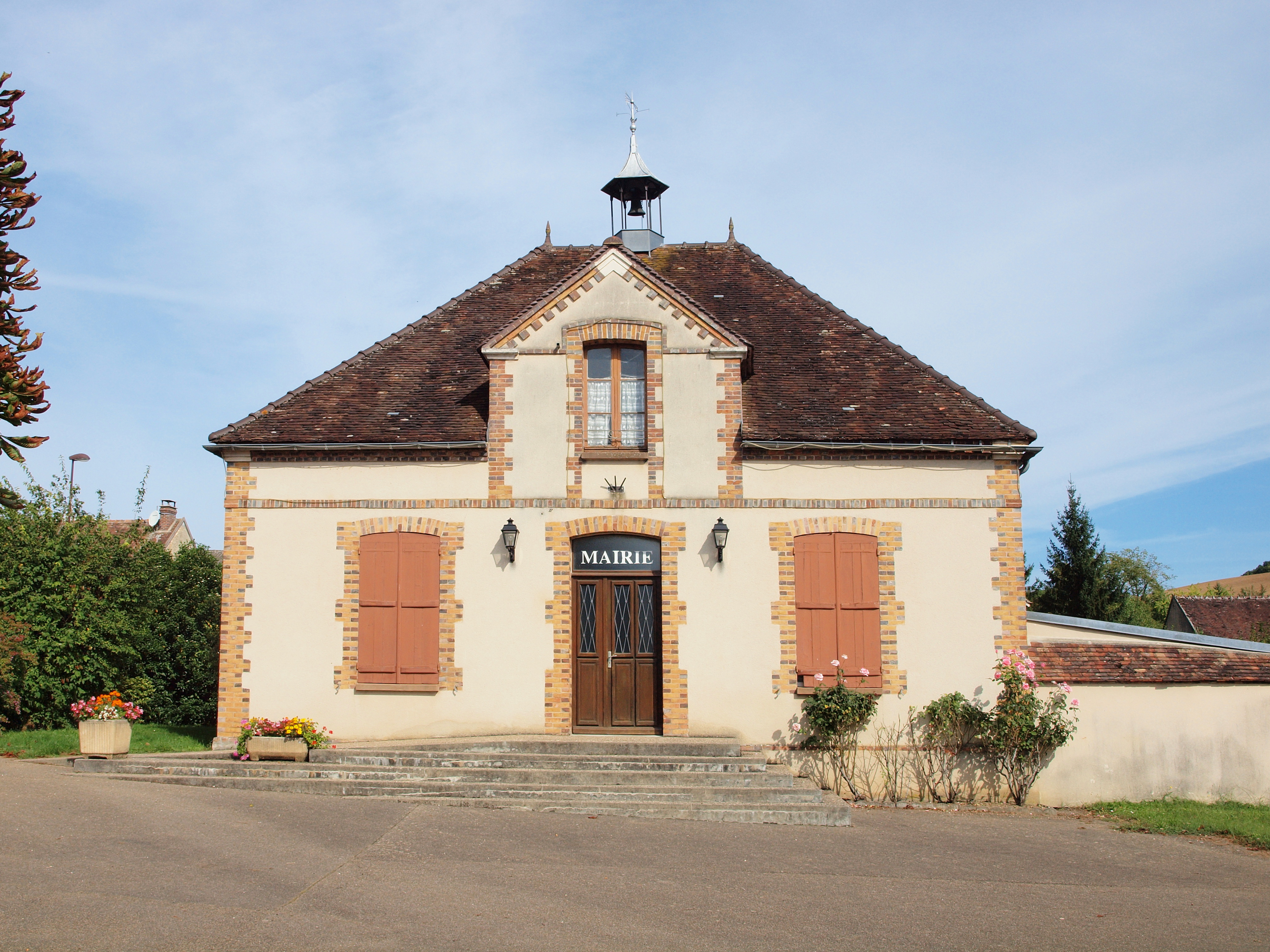
- The town hall in Villiers-Louis

- Coat of arms
- Location of Villiers-Louis
- Location within France Location within Bourgogne-Franche-Comté
- Coordinates: 48°11′30″N 3°24′12″E
- Country: France
- Region: Bourgogne-Franche-Comté
- Department: Yonne
- Arrondissement: Sens
- Canton: Brienon-sur-Armançon
- Intercommunality: CA Grand Sénonais

Government
  - Mayor (2020–2026): Jean-Louis Gaujard
- Area^{1}: 11.07 km^{2} (4.27 sq mi)
- Highest elevation: 226 m (741 ft)
- Lowest elevation: 86 m (282 ft)
- Population (2023): 451
  - Density: 40.7/km^{2} (106/sq mi)
- Time zone: UTC+01:00 (CET)
  - Summer (DST): UTC+02:00 (CEST)
- INSEE/Postal code: 89471 /89320
- ^{1} French Land Register data, which excludes lakes, ponds, glaciers > 1 km^{2} (0.386 sq mi or 247 acres) and river estuaries.

Villiers-Louis (French pronunciation: [vilje lwi], [vijɛʁ-]) is a commune in the Yonne department in Bourgogne-Franche-Comté in north-central France.

== See also ==
- Communes of the Yonne department
