= Malay-le-Petit =

- Commune
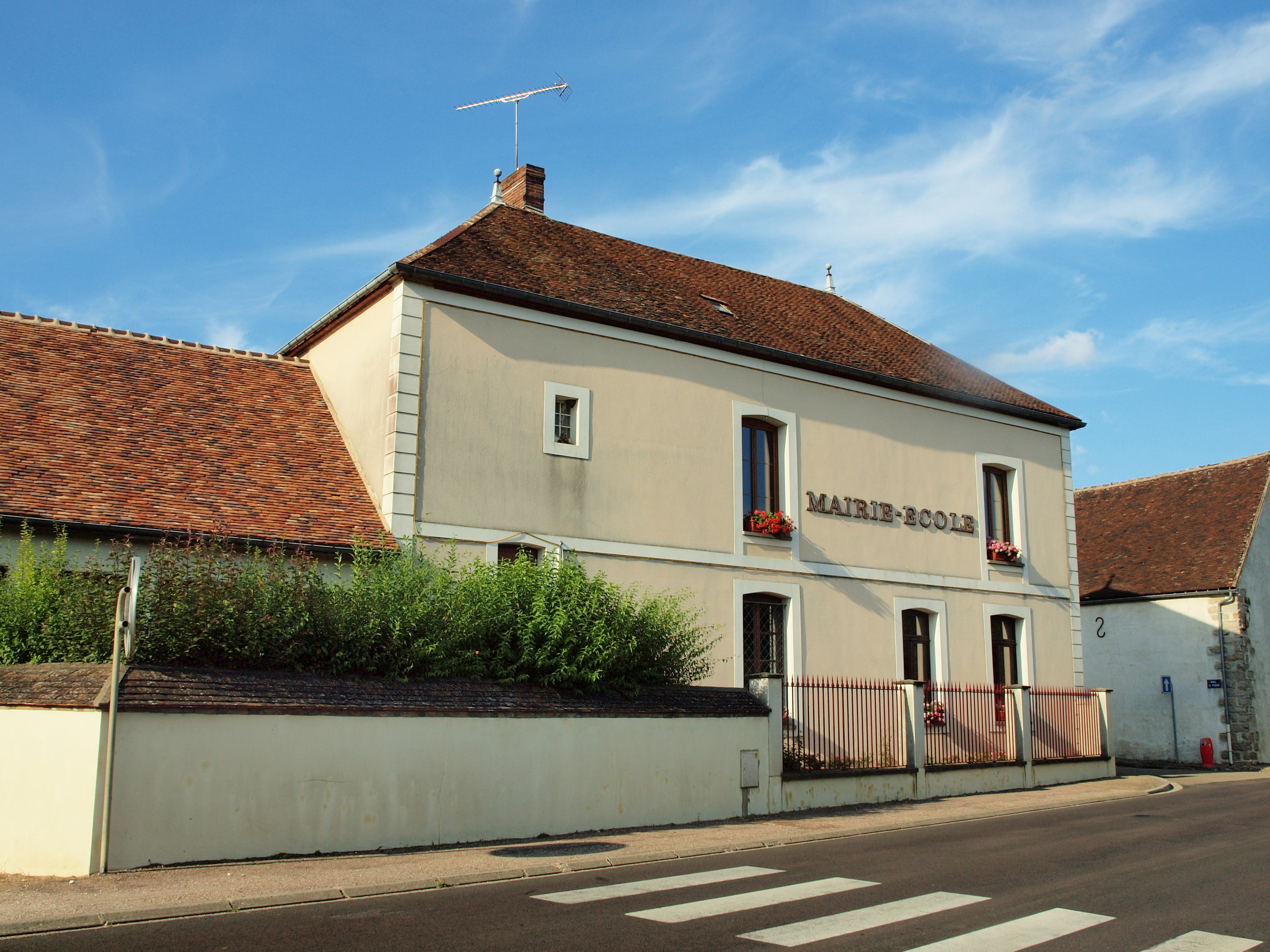
- The town hall in Malay-le-Petit
- Location of Malay-le-Petit
- Location within France Location within Bourgogne-Franche-Comté
- Coordinates: 48°10′24″N 3°22′58″E
- Country: France
- Region: Bourgogne-Franche-Comté
- Department: Yonne
- Arrondissement: Sens
- Canton: Brienon-sur-Armançon
- Intercommunality: CA Grand Sénonais

Government
  - Mayor (2020–2026): Danielle Pouthé
- Area^{1}: 11.04 km^{2} (4.26 sq mi)
- Highest elevation: 217 m (712 ft)
- Lowest elevation: 81 m (266 ft)
- Population (2023): 305
  - Density: 27.6/km^{2} (71.6/sq mi)
- Time zone: UTC+01:00 (CET)
  - Summer (DST): UTC+02:00 (CEST)
- INSEE/Postal code: 89240 /89100
- ^{1} French Land Register data, which excludes lakes, ponds, glaciers > 1 km^{2} (0.386 sq mi or 247 acres) and river estuaries.

Malay-le-Petit (French pronunciation: [malɛ lə pəti]) is a commune in the Yonne department in Bourgogne-Franche-Comté in north-central France.

== See also ==
- Communes of the Yonne department
