= Molinons =

- Commune
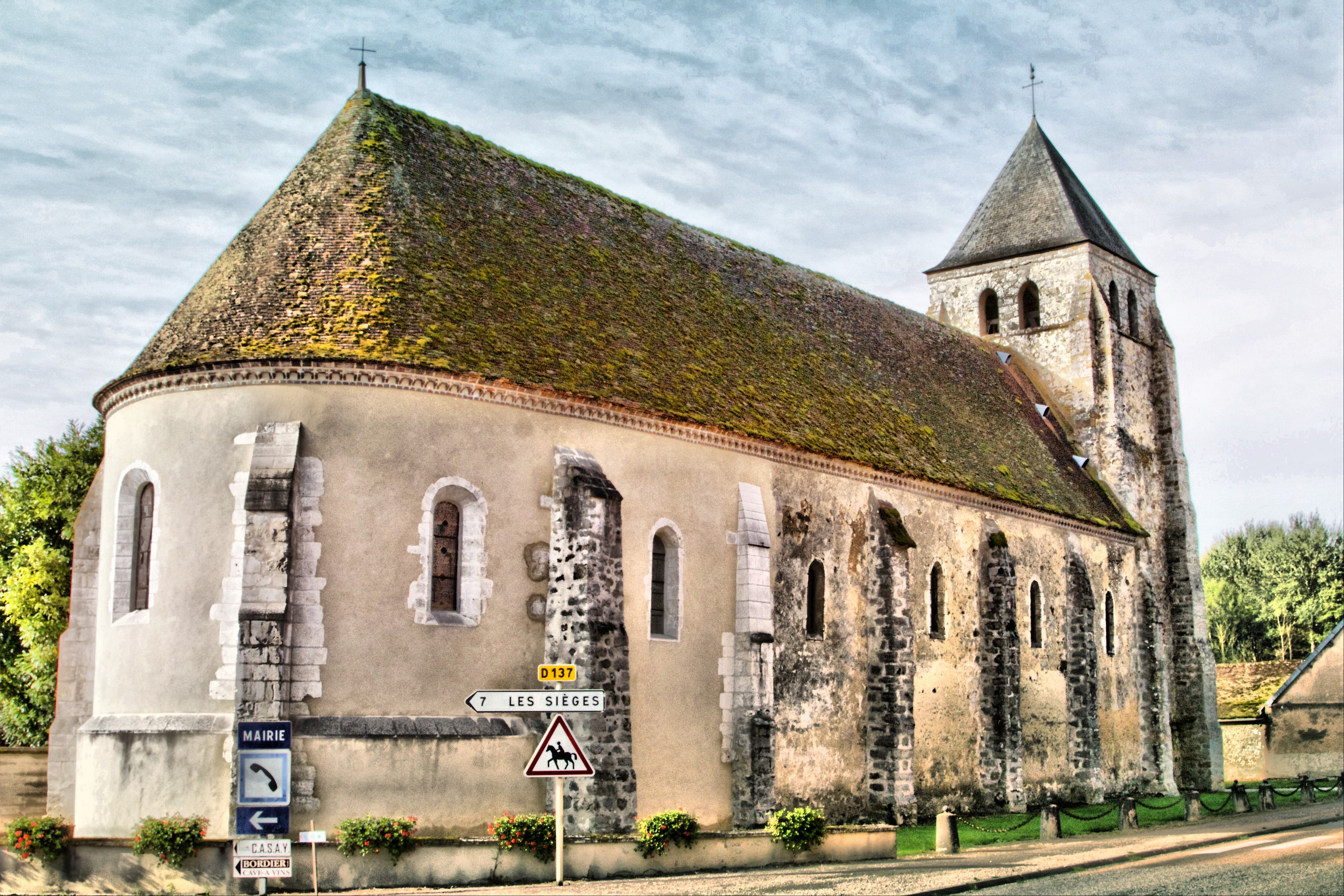
- The church in Molinons
- Location of Molinons
- Location within France Location within Bourgogne-Franche-Comté
- Coordinates: 48°13′55″N 3°32′14″E
- Country: France
- Region: Bourgogne-Franche-Comté
- Department: Yonne
- Arrondissement: Sens
- Canton: Brienon-sur-Armançon

Government
  - Mayor (2020–2026): Yves Bézine
- Area^{1}: 11.97 km^{2} (4.62 sq mi)
- Highest elevation: 236 m (774 ft)
- Lowest elevation: 98 m (322 ft)
- Population (2023): 273
  - Density: 22.8/km^{2} (59.1/sq mi)
- Time zone: UTC+01:00 (CET)
  - Summer (DST): UTC+02:00 (CEST)
- INSEE/Postal code: 89261 /89190
- ^{1} French Land Register data, which excludes lakes, ponds, glaciers > 1 km^{2} (0.386 sq mi or 247 acres) and river estuaries.

Molinons (French pronunciation: [mɔlinɔ̃]) is a commune in the Yonne department in Bourgogne-Franche-Comté in north-central France.

== See also ==
- Communes of the Yonne department
