= Pont-sur-Vanne =

- Commune
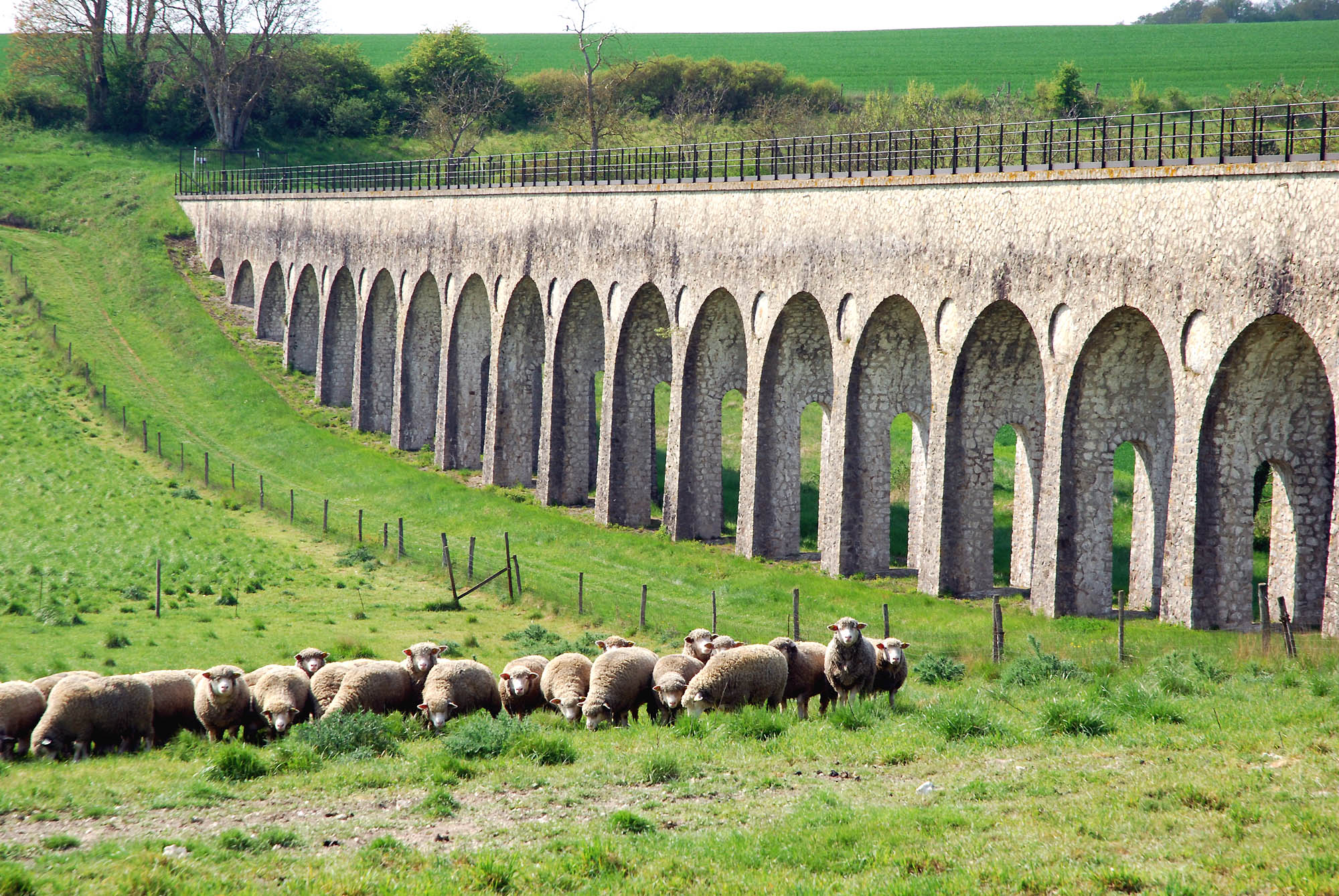
- The Vanne aqueduct in Pont-sur-Vanne
- Location of Pont-sur-Vanne
- Location within France Location within Bourgogne-Franche-Comté
- Coordinates: 48°11′06″N 3°26′37″E
- Country: France
- Region: Bourgogne-Franche-Comté
- Department: Yonne
- Arrondissement: Sens
- Canton: Brienon-sur-Armançon

Government
  - Mayor (2020–2026): Valérie Picon
- Area^{1}: 10.47 km^{2} (4.04 sq mi)
- Highest elevation: 233 m (764 ft)
- Lowest elevation: 86 m (282 ft)
- Population (2023): 216
  - Density: 20.6/km^{2} (53.4/sq mi)
- Time zone: UTC+01:00 (CET)
  - Summer (DST): UTC+02:00 (CEST)
- INSEE/Postal code: 89308 /89190
- ^{1} French Land Register data, which excludes lakes, ponds, glaciers > 1 km^{2} (0.386 sq mi or 247 acres) and river estuaries.

Pont-sur-Vanne (French pronunciation: [pɔ̃ syʁ van]) is a commune in the Yonne department in Bourgogne-Franche-Comté in north-central France.

== See also ==
- Communes of the Yonne department
