= Foissy-sur-Vanne =

- Commune
- Location of Foissy-sur-Vanne
- Location within France Location within Bourgogne-Franche-Comté
- Coordinates: 48°13′30″N 3°30′23″E
- Country: France
- Region: Bourgogne-Franche-Comté
- Department: Yonne
- Arrondissement: Sens
- Canton: Brienon-sur-Armançon

Government
  - Mayor (2020–2026): Jeanne Saincierge
- Area^{1}: 15.75 km^{2} (6.08 sq mi)
- Highest elevation: 213 m (699 ft)
- Lowest elevation: 95 m (312 ft)
- Population (2023): 298
  - Density: 18.9/km^{2} (49.0/sq mi)
- Time zone: UTC+01:00 (CET)
  - Summer (DST): UTC+02:00 (CEST)
- INSEE/Postal code: 89171 /89190
- ^{1} French Land Register data, which excludes lakes, ponds, glaciers > 1 km^{2} (0.386 sq mi or 247 acres) and river estuaries.

Foissy-sur-Vanne (French pronunciation: [fwasi syʁ van], literally Foissy on Vanne) is a commune in the Yonne department in Bourgogne-Franche-Comté in north-central France.

== See also ==
- Communes of the Yonne department
