= Villeneuve-l'Archevêque =

- Commune
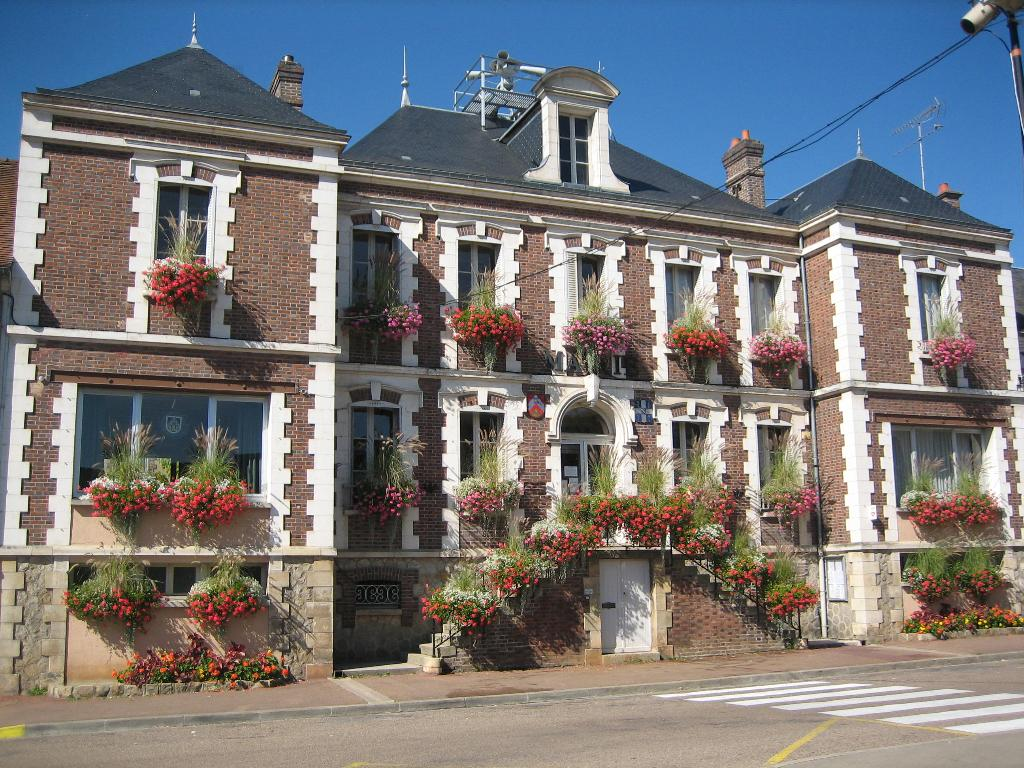
- The town hall in Villeneuve-l'Archevêque

- Coat of arms
- Location of Villeneuve-l'Archevêque
- Location within France Location within Bourgogne-Franche-Comté
- Coordinates: 48°14′10″N 3°33′24″E
- Country: France
- Region: Bourgogne-Franche-Comté
- Department: Yonne
- Arrondissement: Sens
- Canton: Brienon-sur-Armançon

Government
  - Mayor (2020–2026): Sébastien Karcher
- Area^{1}: 6.89 km^{2} (2.66 sq mi)
- Highest elevation: 215 m (705 ft)
- Lowest elevation: 102 m (335 ft)
- Population (2023): 1,112
  - Density: 161/km^{2} (418/sq mi)
- Time zone: UTC+01:00 (CET)
  - Summer (DST): UTC+02:00 (CEST)
- INSEE/Postal code: 89461 /89190
- ^{1} French Land Register data, which excludes lakes, ponds, glaciers > 1 km^{2} (0.386 sq mi or 247 acres) and river estuaries.

Villeneuve-l'Archevêque (French pronunciation: [vilnœv laʁʃəvɛk]) is a commune in the Yonne department in Bourgogne-Franche-Comté in north-central France.

== See also ==
- Communes of the Yonne department
