= Bagneaux =

- Commune
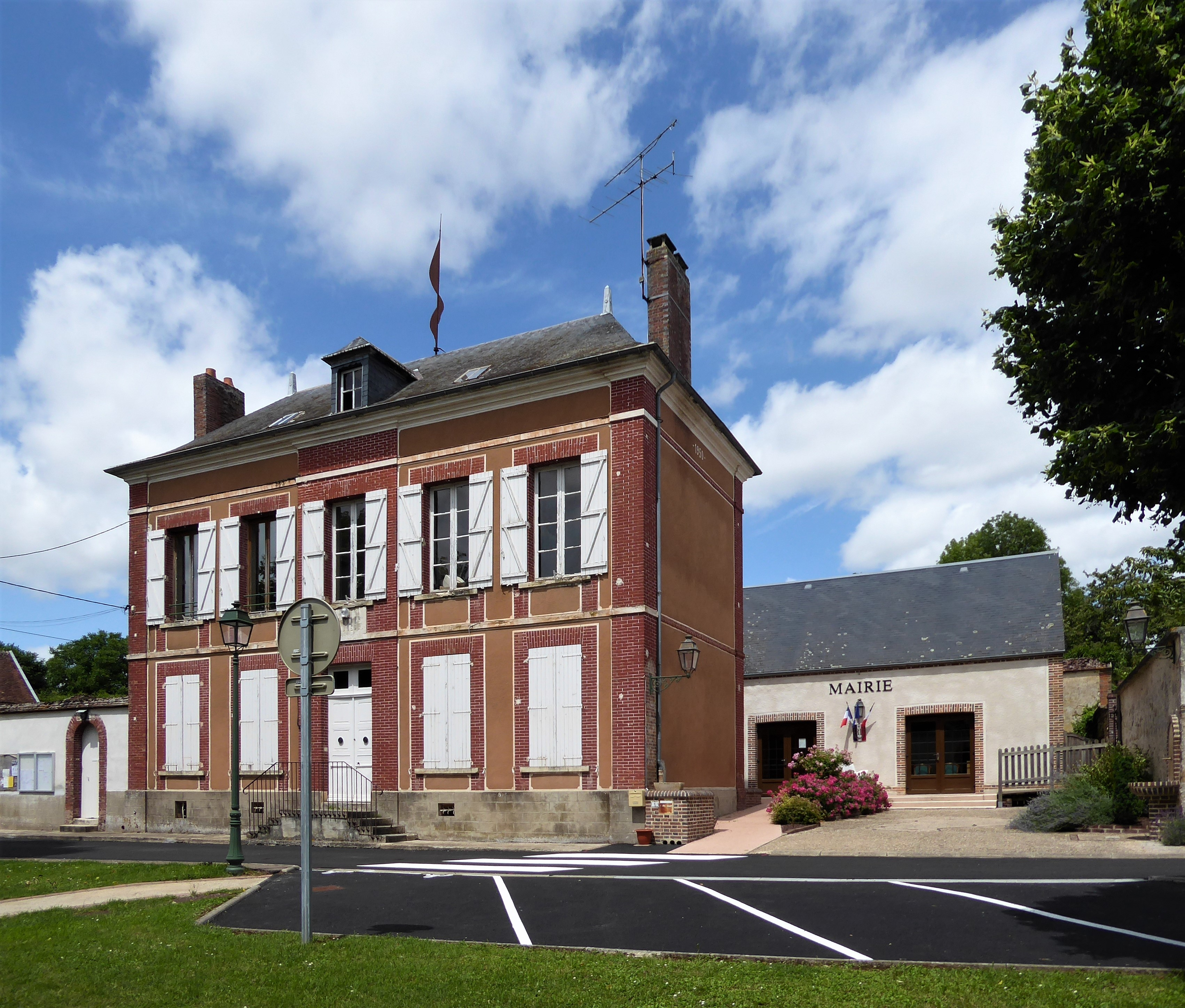
- The old town hall in Bagneaux
- Location of Bagneaux
- Location within France Location within Bourgogne-Franche-Comté
- Coordinates: 48°14′02″N 3°35′44″E
- Country: France
- Region: Bourgogne-Franche-Comté
- Department: Yonne
- Arrondissement: Sens
- Canton: Brienon-sur-Armançon

Government
  - Mayor (2020–2026): William Georges
- Area^{1}: 16.24 km^{2} (6.27 sq mi)
- Highest elevation: 236 m (774 ft)
- Lowest elevation: 106 m (348 ft)
- Population (2023): 196
  - Density: 12.1/km^{2} (31.3/sq mi)
- Time zone: UTC+01:00 (CET)
  - Summer (DST): UTC+02:00 (CEST)
- INSEE/Postal code: 89027 /89190
- Website: https://www.bagneaux.fr/
- ^{1} French Land Register data, which excludes lakes, ponds, glaciers > 1 km^{2} (0.386 sq mi or 247 acres) and river estuaries.

Bagneaux (French pronunciation: [baɲo]) is a commune in the Yonne department in Bourgogne-Franche-Comté in north-central France.

== See also ==
- Communes of the Yonne department
