= Roger Lassale =

French politician (1935–2025)

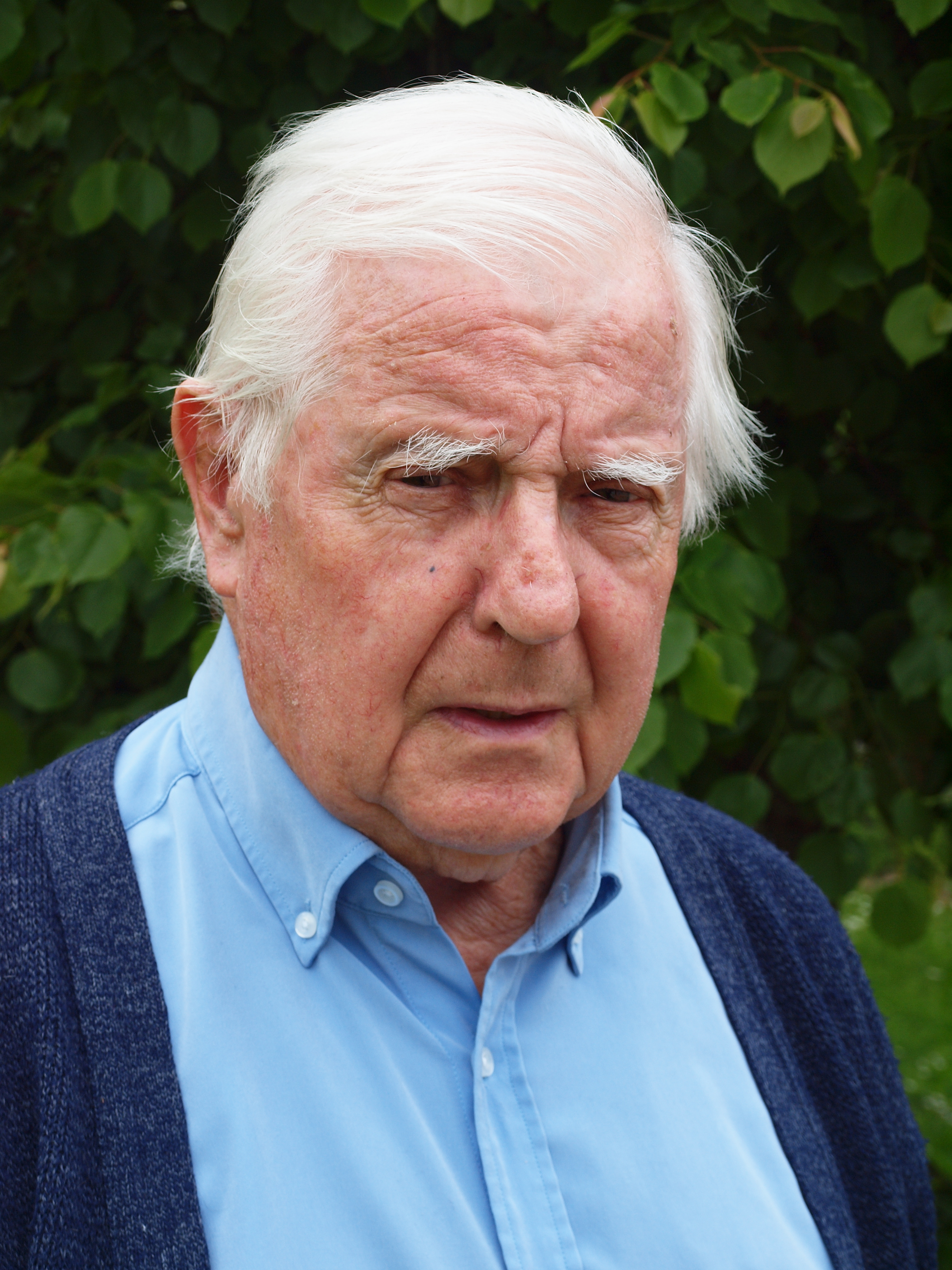
- Lassale in 2021

Deputy of the French National Assembly for Yonne's 3rd constituency
- In office 2 July 1981 – 1 April 1986
- Preceded by: Jacques Piot
- Succeeded by: Philippe Auberger (1988)

Mayor of Pont-sur-Yonne
- In office 1974–2005
- Preceded by: Maurice Brisson
- Succeeded by: Christian Brière

Member of the General Council of Yonne for the Canton of Pont-sur-Yonne
- In office 1973–1998
- Preceded by: Maurice Brisson
- Succeeded by: Christian Brière

Personal details
- Born: 26 August 1935; Maurs, France
- Died: 12 May 2025 (aged 89)
- Political party: Socialist Party
- Occupation: Schoolteacher; politician

Roger Lassale (26 August 1935 – 12 May 2025) was a French schoolteacher and politician of the Socialist Party (PS).

Lassale served as Mayor of Pont-sur-Yonne from 1974 to 2005 and was a member of the General Council of Yonne from 1973 to 1998. He represented Yonne's 3rd constituency in the National Assembly from 1981 to 1986.

Lassale died on 12 May 2025, at the age of 89.
