= Georges Petetin =

French painter

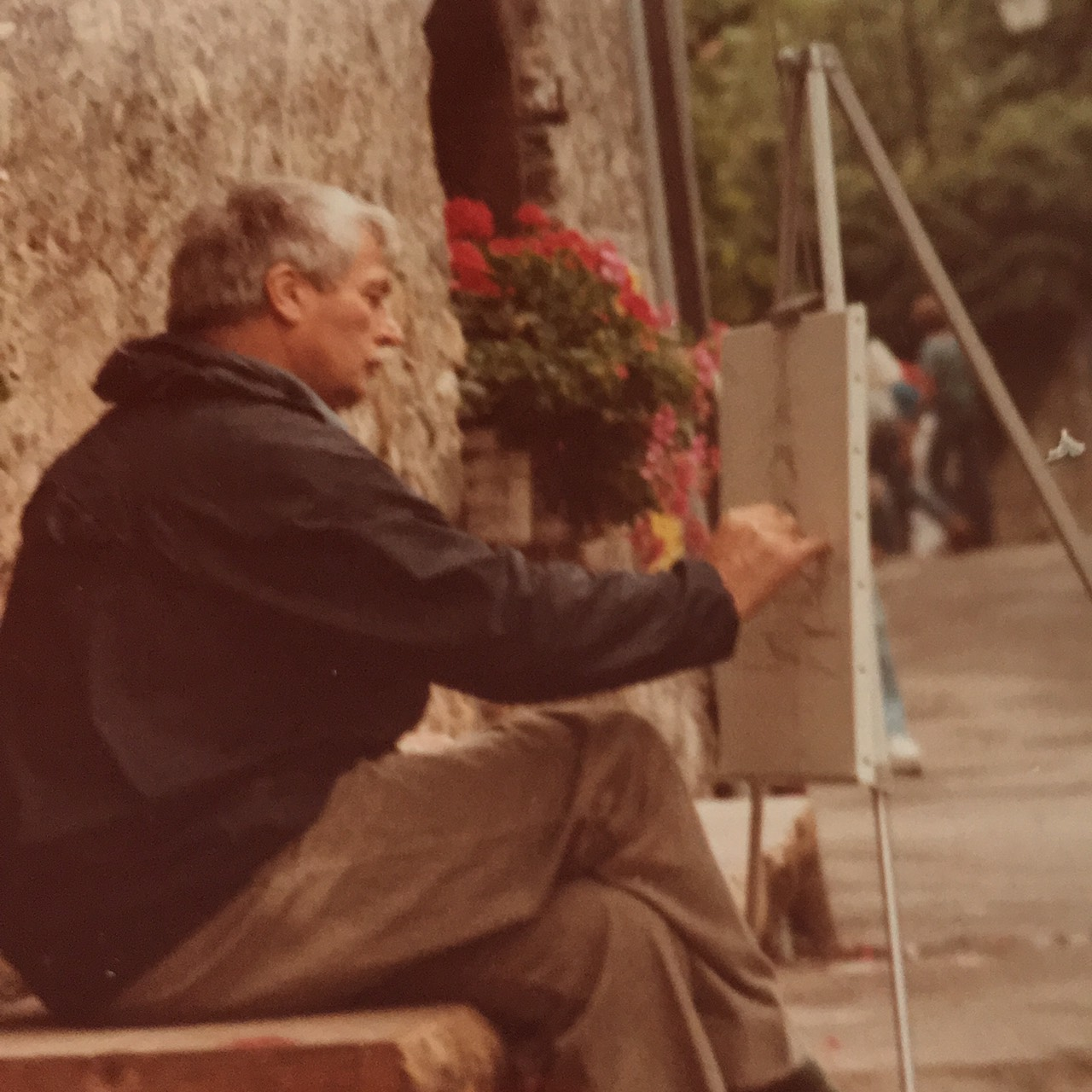
- Born: 10 February 1920; Saint-Lupicin, France
- Died: 13 January 2012 (aged 91); Auxerre, France
- Education: Louis Roger; Émile Bernard
- Known for: Painter, Sculptor
- Movement: Still Life, Landscapes
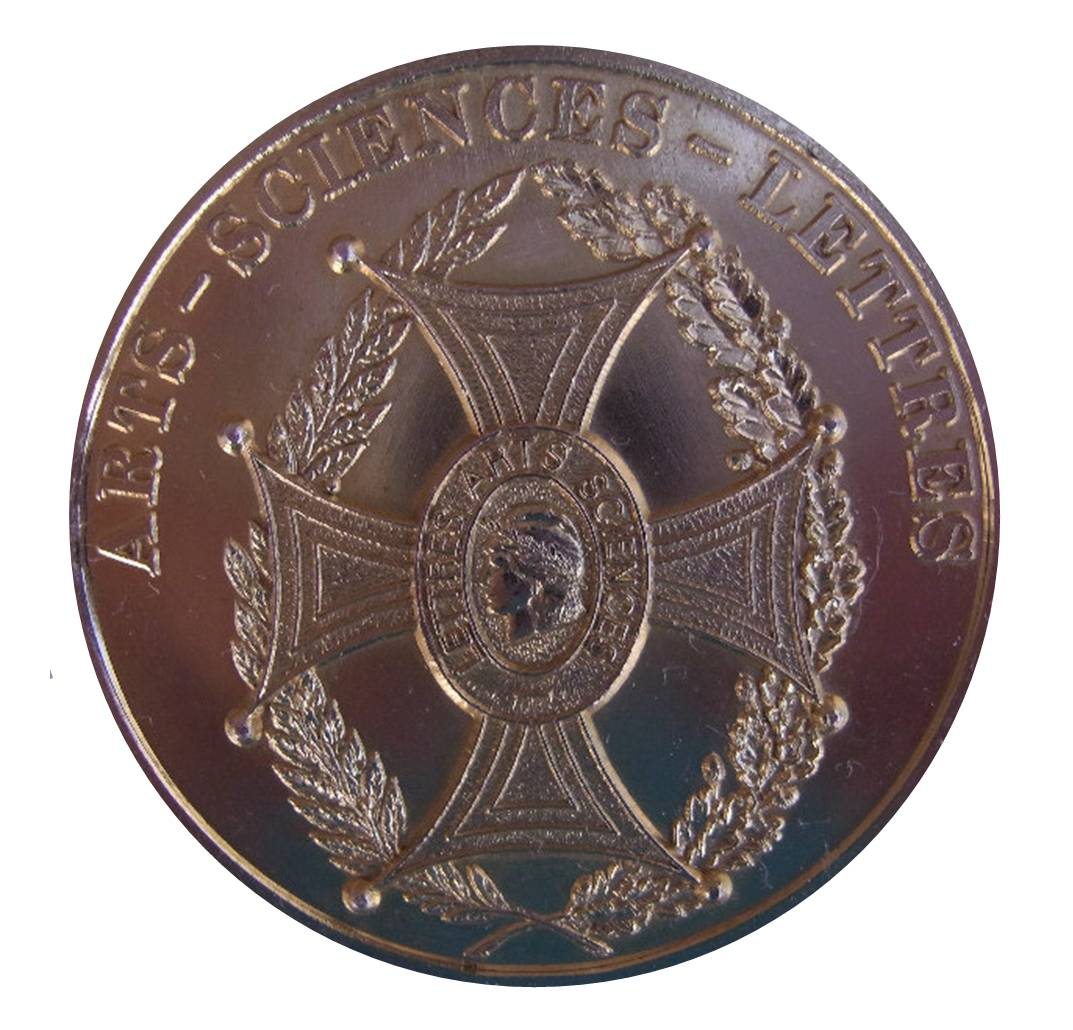
- Awards: Arts-Sciences-Letters

Georges Camille Gabriel Petetin (10 February 1920, Saint-Lupicin – 13 January 2012, Auxerre), was a French still life and landscape painter and sculptor.

== Biography ==
Georges Petetin was raised in Saint-Lupicin in the Jura region of France by his parents (Gaston Petetin and Marie Louise LeGuay) and his grandparents (Edmond and Valentine Leguay). He spent much of his youth living with his grandparents in Septmoncel in the Haut-Jura region. It was from them that he developed his taste for wide open spaces and a love of nature.

In his adolescence, his parents moved to Besancon. He enrolled in the Ecole des Beaux-Arts of Besancon in 1934 and studied there until 1936. He was awarded several prizes for the art and sculpture there. One of these prizes was a scholarship to continue his art studies in Paris.

In 1937, Petetin was admitted to the Academy of Beaux-Arts of Paris where studied under (among others) Louis Roger from 1937 to 1939. His scholarship did not include living expenses, so he also worked painting theater backdrops while pursuing his studies.

Petetin studied with Émile Bernard who noticed his talent in 1934, and took him as a student, becoming his master teacher from 1937 to 1941, introducing him to many celebrated artists.

When World War II began, Émile Bernard wrote a letter on Petetin's behalf, petitioning "To the Captain of the 24th infantry Regiment of the 6th Company; To please remove [his] student, Georges Petetin, from the military authority; so he can pursue his courses at the Academy of Beaux-Arts in Paris." Despite the efforts of his master, Georges Petetin left for the front in 1940. At the battle of Chateau-Porcien in 1941, he was wounded by a mortar and was sent to Reims for recovery, where he used the opportunity to show several works at the Pau Museum. Upon returning to Besancon, on June 17 1943 he married Elsa Martinelli (1922-2020).

Georges Petetin became known for his art principally through expositions at the Old Post Office in Besancon. He joined the Society of French Artists in 1964, and began showing regularly at the Grand_Palais in Paris.

In the 1970s, Georges Petetin began a more focused part of his career. He received his first medal for an international competition in 1973 for his works 'Still Life with Fish' and 'The Stream'. He also began to show his works in the United States, most notably in Washington state, San Francisco, and Washington, D.C.

In 1974, he was granted an honorary diploma and bronze medal of Arts, Sciences, and Lettres. The prize was for still life works submitted to the International Competition for Contemporary Art held in Lyon. At the Salon and international competition of Bourgogne France-Comte in 1978, he received another medal in the category of Art Figuratif Classique. in 1983 he received the gold medal for the same.

In 1999, he left Besancon to live in Auxerre in Yonne, where he continued to paint and sculpt. In Auxerre, he held regular expositions at the TIA Gallery in Migennes and in Sens. One of his paintings was published in the book L'Yonne et les peintres (The Yonne and its Painters) to illustrate the gothic cathedral Saint-Etienne d'Auxerre.

In 2008, he stopped painting due to declining health. He died at his home in Auxerre on 13 January 2012.

== Expositions ==
- 1937 : L’orangerie Museum (Blumenthal Foundation show), Paris.
- 1941 : Beaux-Arts Museum in Pau.
- 1941 : galerie de l’ancienne poste, Besançon.
- 1964-1983 : Salon des artistes français, Grand Palais, Paris.
- 1970 : Yakima Washington, USA.
- 1972 and 1975 : Harris Fine Arts Center, Brigham Young University Provo Utah, USA.
- 1973 and 1975 : Richland Washington, USA.
- 1976 : Salon la liberté Grand Palais, Paris. Painting shown: Nature morte à la bougie (Still Life by Candle).
- 1977 : Galerie la rose Traversée, Brussels, Belgium.
- 1979 : Chapel of the Jesuits, Chaumont. Painting shown: Port d’Ostende.
- 1981 : Galerie Maxim, Yvoire, France.
- 1985-1991 : Galerie de la banque populaire de l’Yonne, Auxerre.
- 1987 and 1988 : Sutter Gallery, San Francisco California, USA.
- 1988-1991 : TIA Gallery, Migennes.
- 1990 : Salon des artistes français, Grand Palais, Paris. Painting shown : Fonte des neiges dans le jura 1887.
- 1991 : Salon France America, Washington D.C., USA.

== Prizes and Titles ==
- 1936 : 3rd Prize of l’école des beaux-arts de Besançon, Buste d’après l’antique
- 1936 : Title of Petit Jean de la Ville de Besançon.
- 1968-1983 : Member of the Society of French Artists
- 1973 : International Figurative Art Competition, Bronze Medal for Nature morte aux poissons (number 119) et Le Ruisseau (number 120)
- 1974 : International Contemporary Still Life Competition, Prize for La Soupe aux choux (Cabbage Soup).
- 1974 : Diploma and bronze medal of Arts, Sciences and Letters
- 1978 : International Salon of Bourgogne of Franche-Comté, Dijon Competition, Bronze medal in the "Art Figuratif Classique" category
- 1983 : International Salon of Bourgogne of Franche-Comté, Dijon Competition, Gold medal in the "Art Figuratif Classique" category
- 1991 : Certificate of participation for exposition in Washington, USA.

== Selected works ==
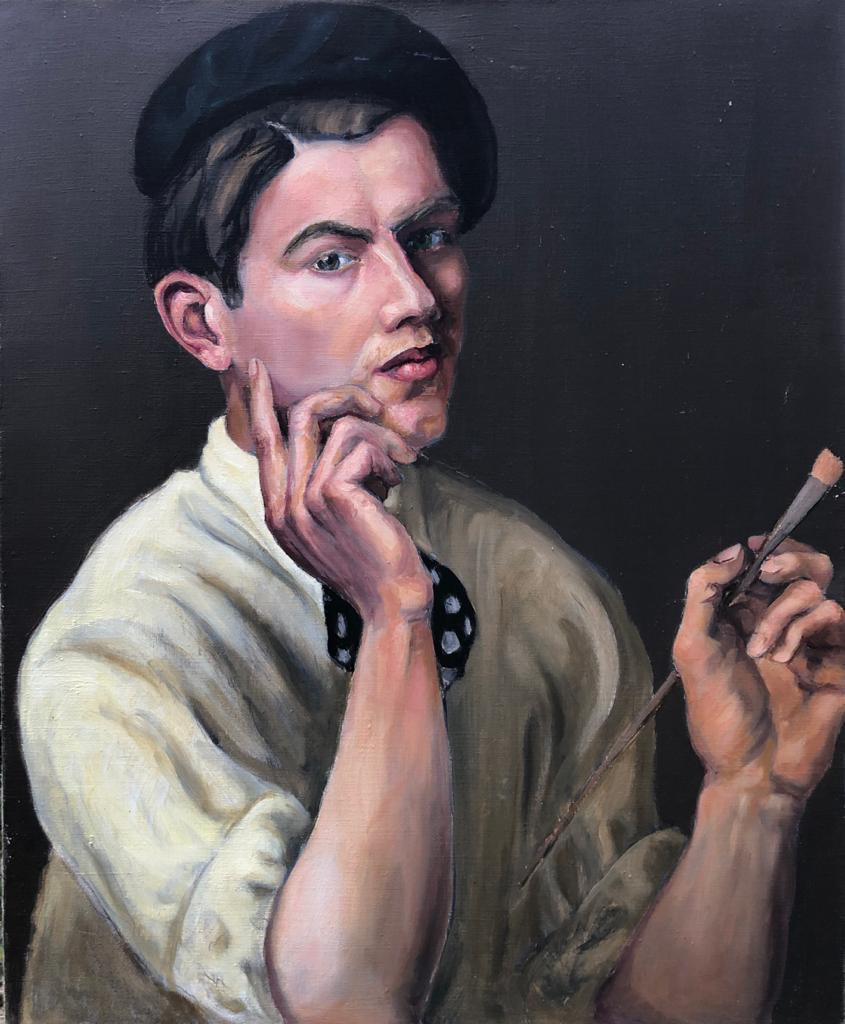
Self-portrait

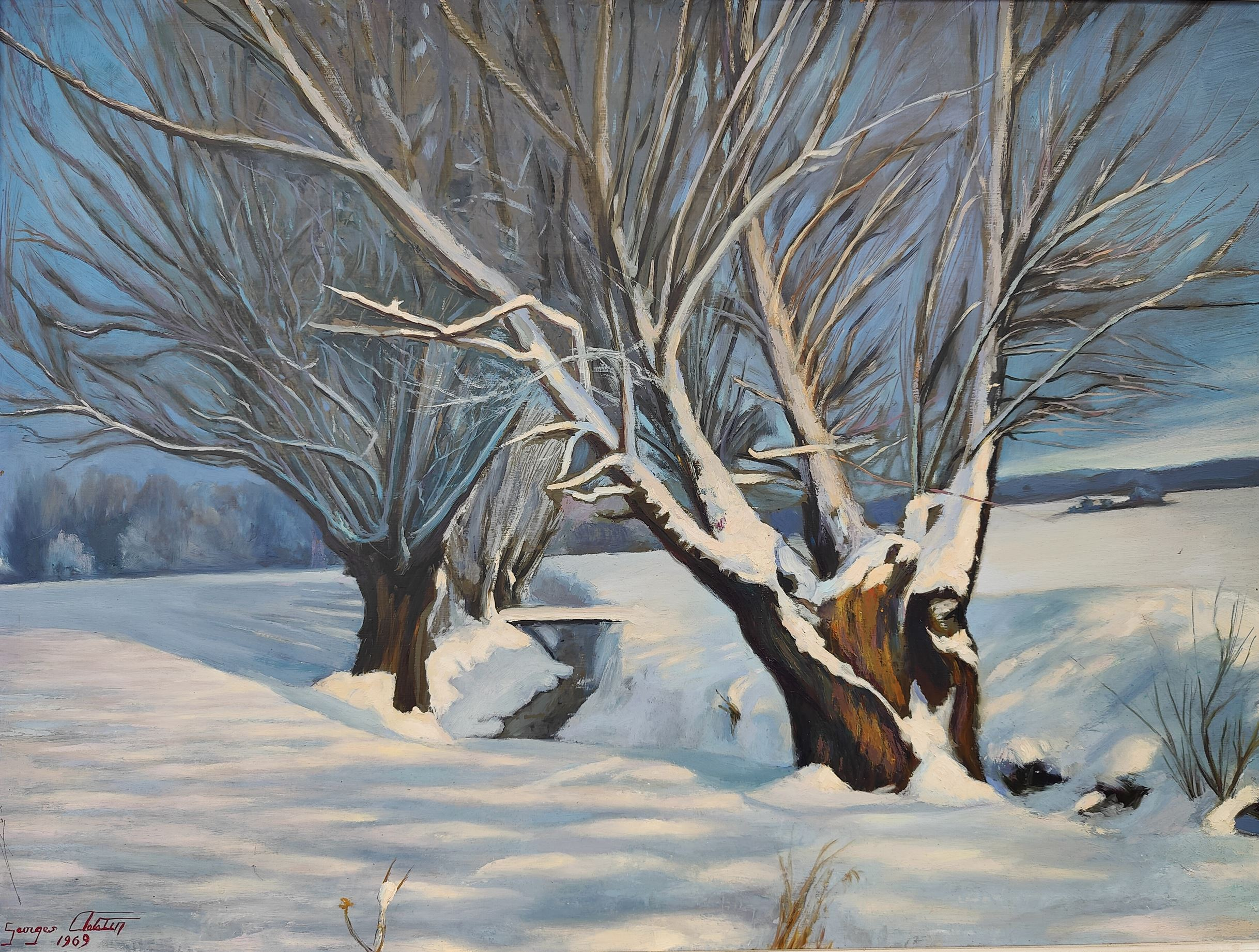
Marais de Saône sous la neige

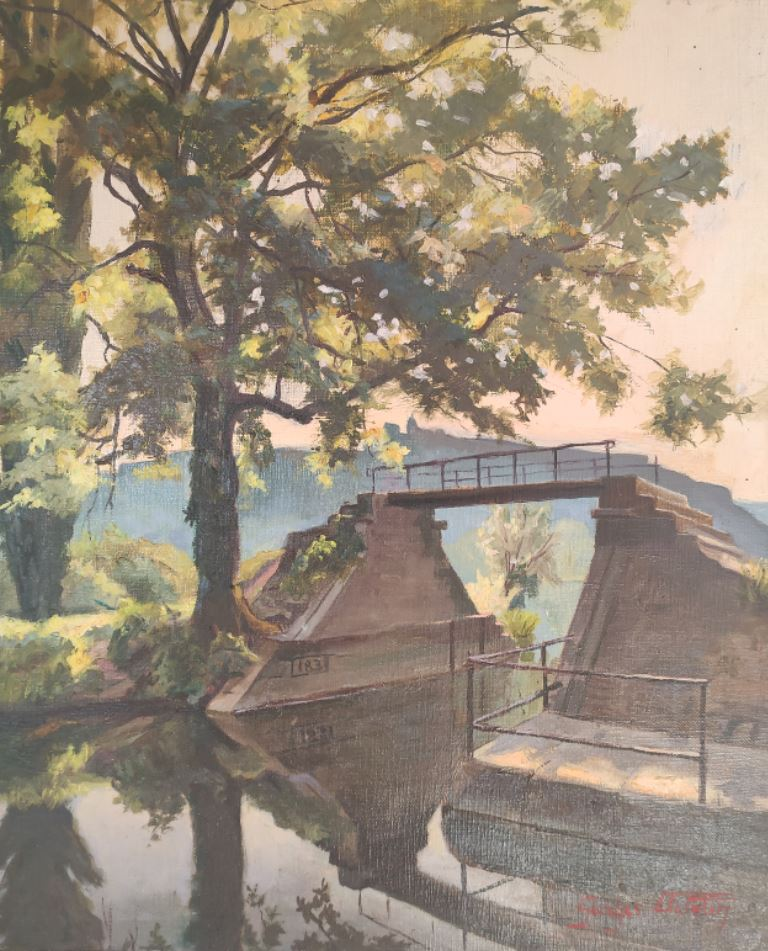
La gare d'eau

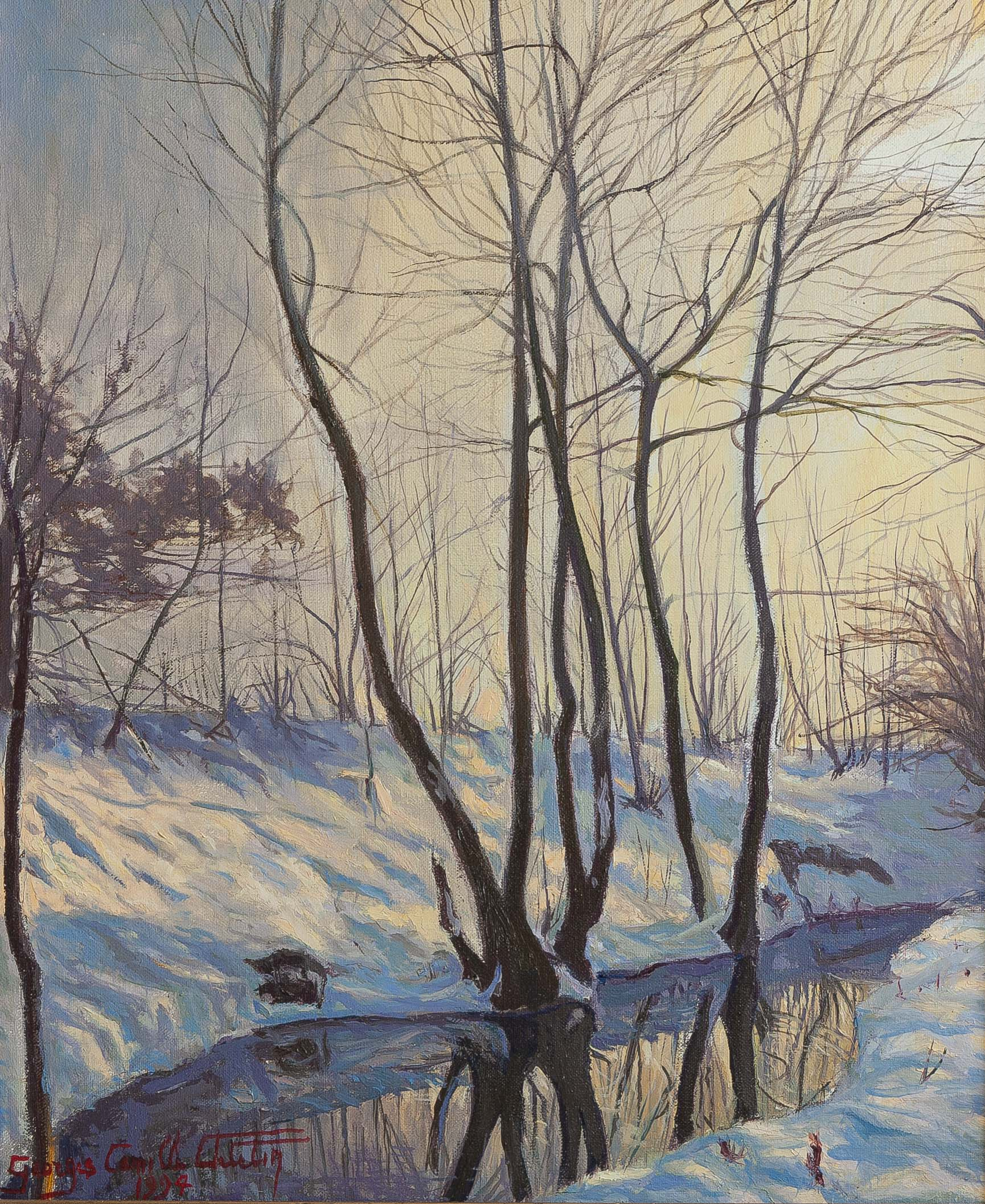
Marais de Saône sous la neige

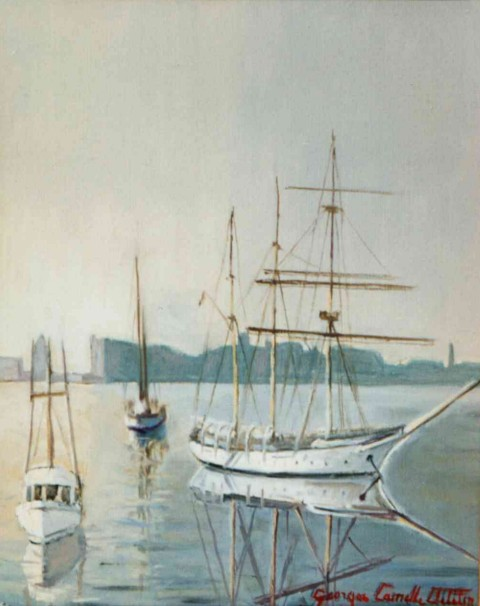
Marine

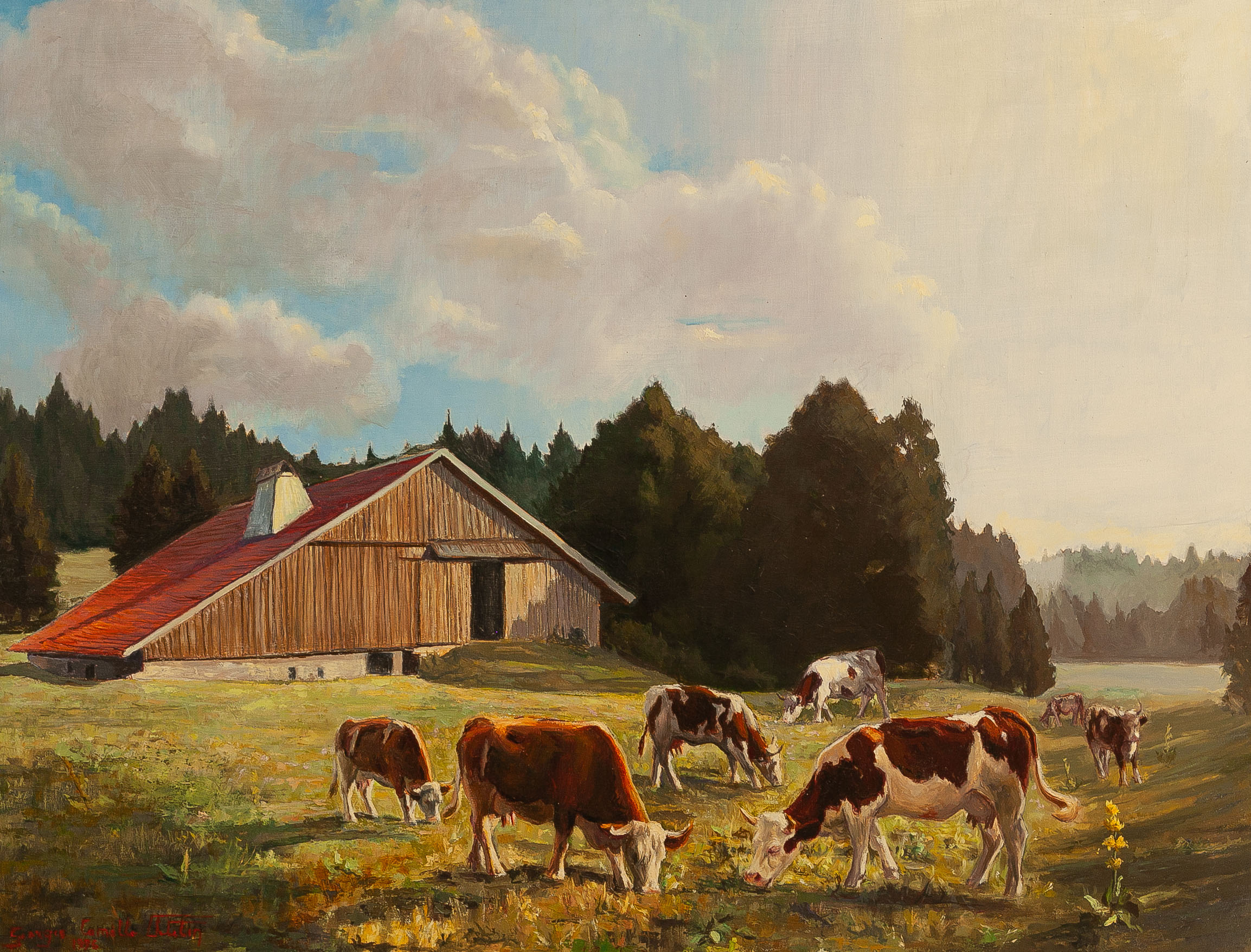
Ferme du haut doubs

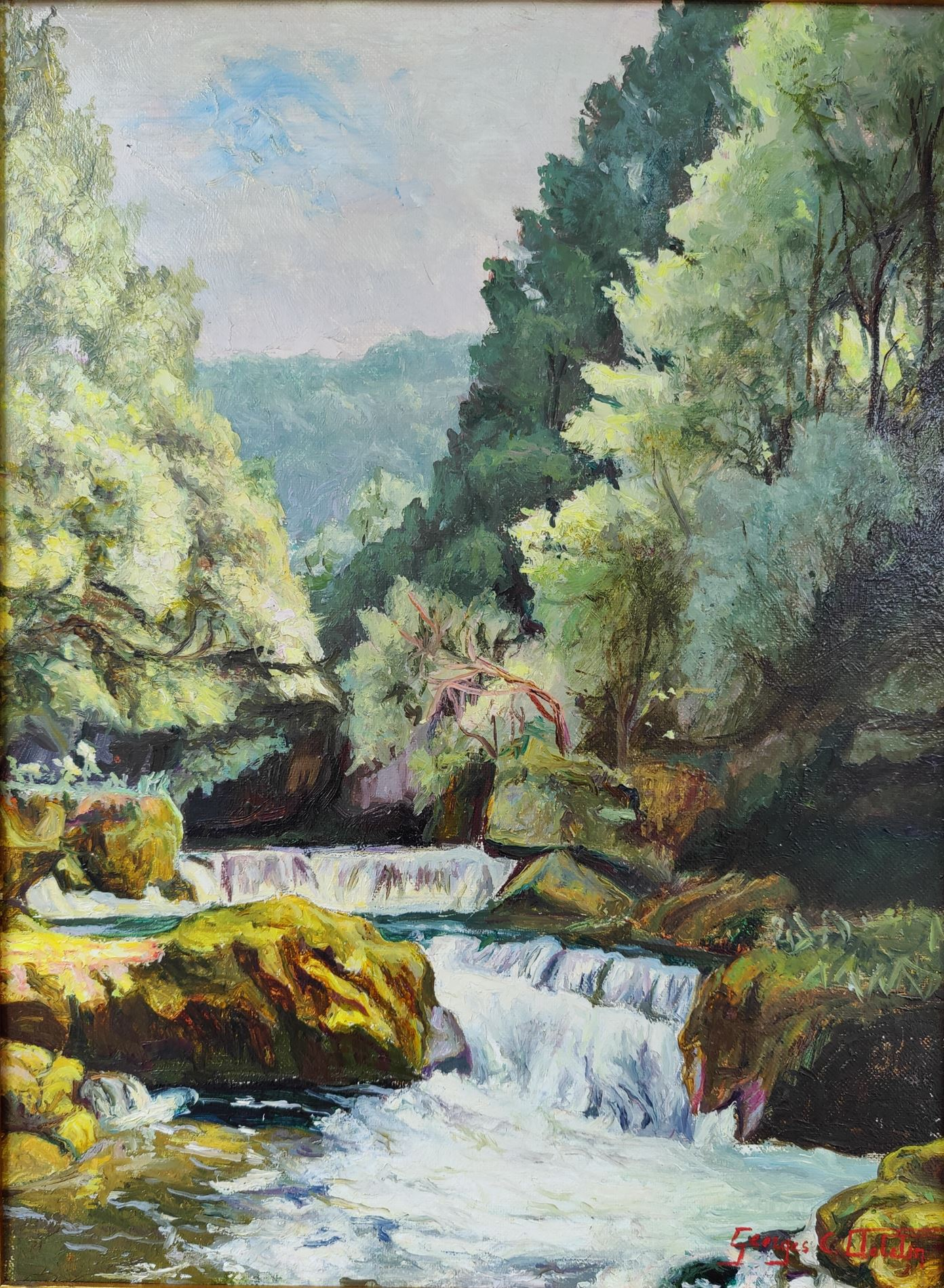
Gorges de Nouailles

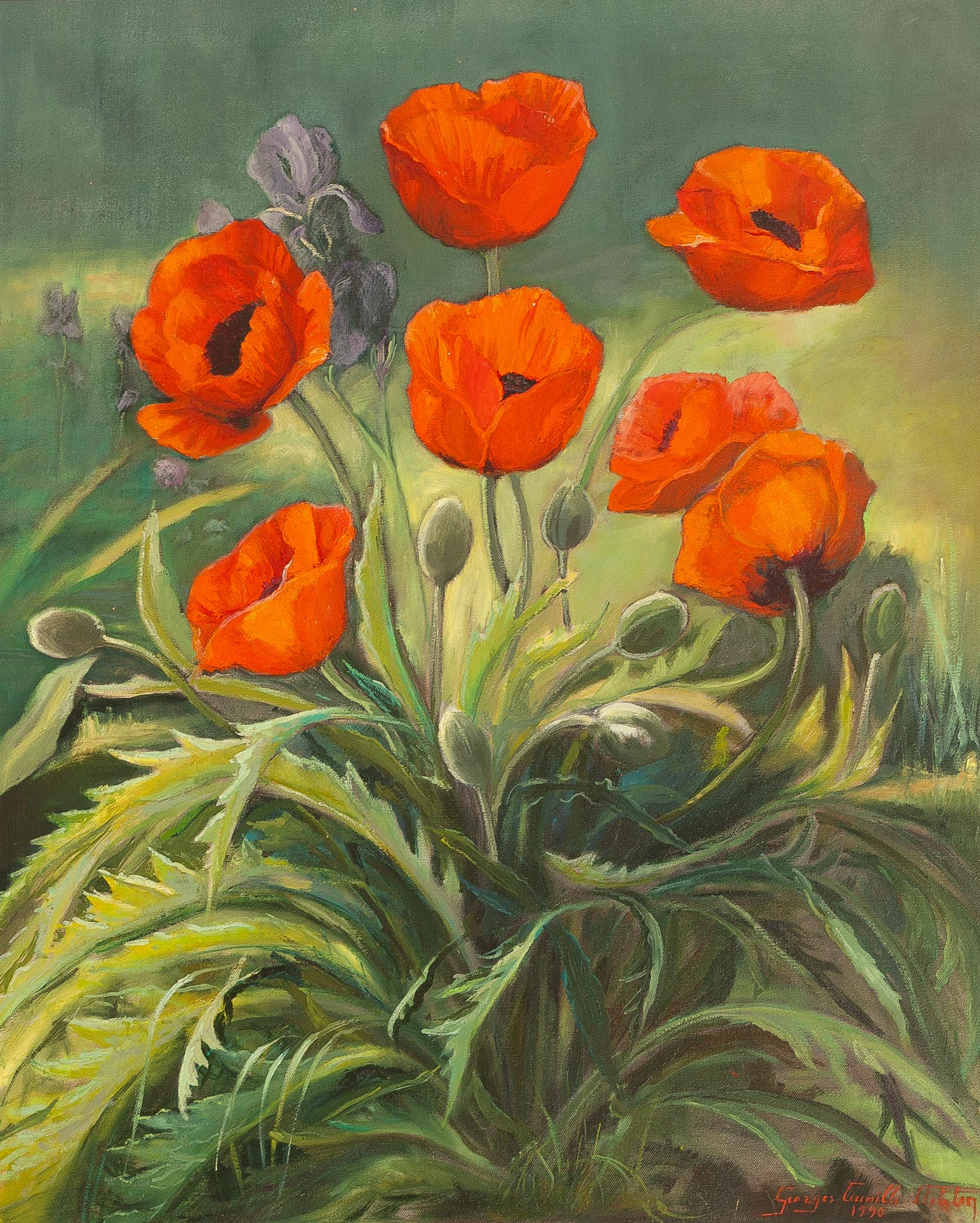
Les pavots

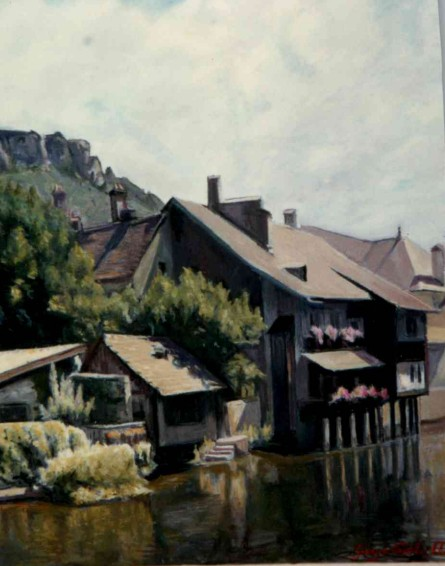
Ornans

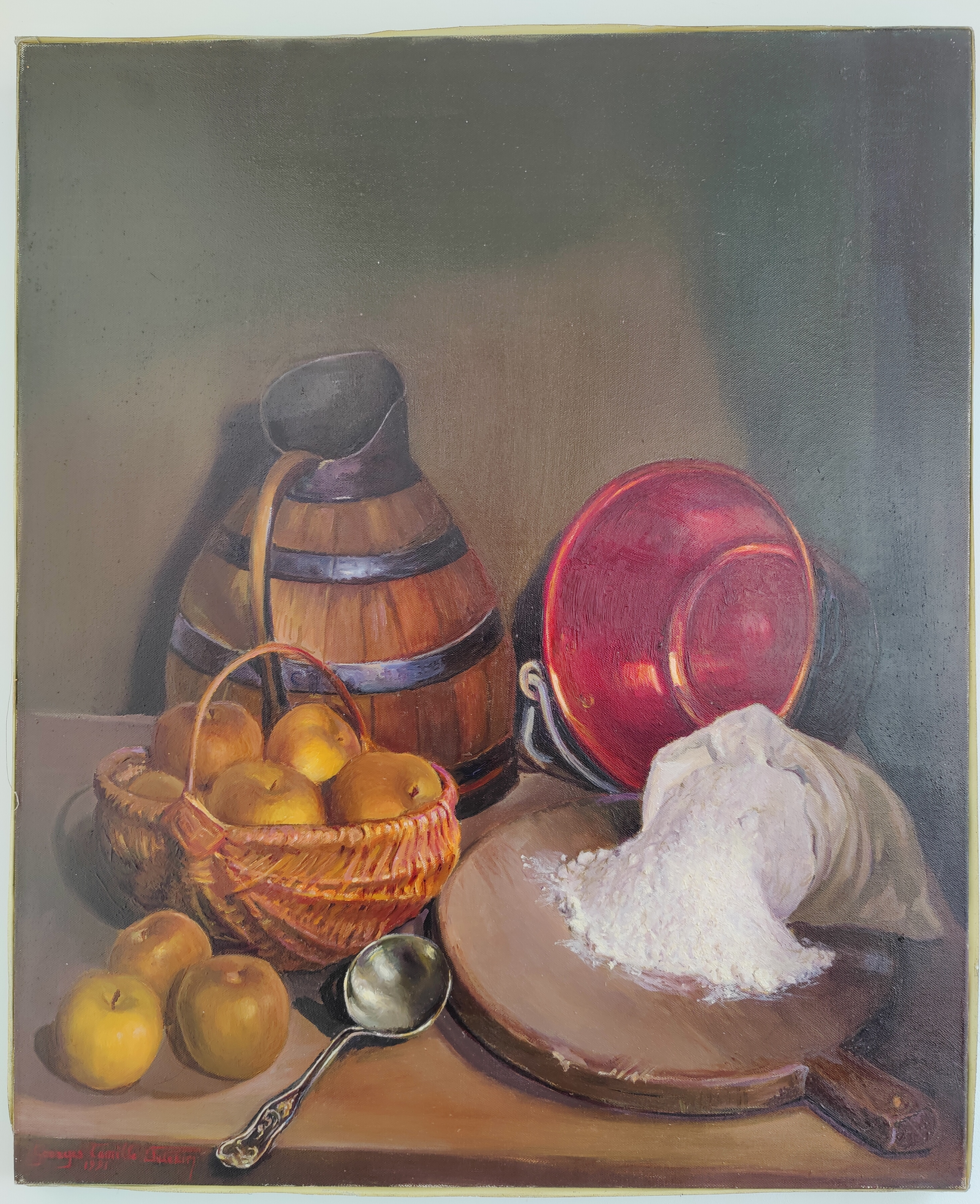
Nature morte tarte aux pommes
