= Marie-Louise Fort =

French politician (1950–2022)

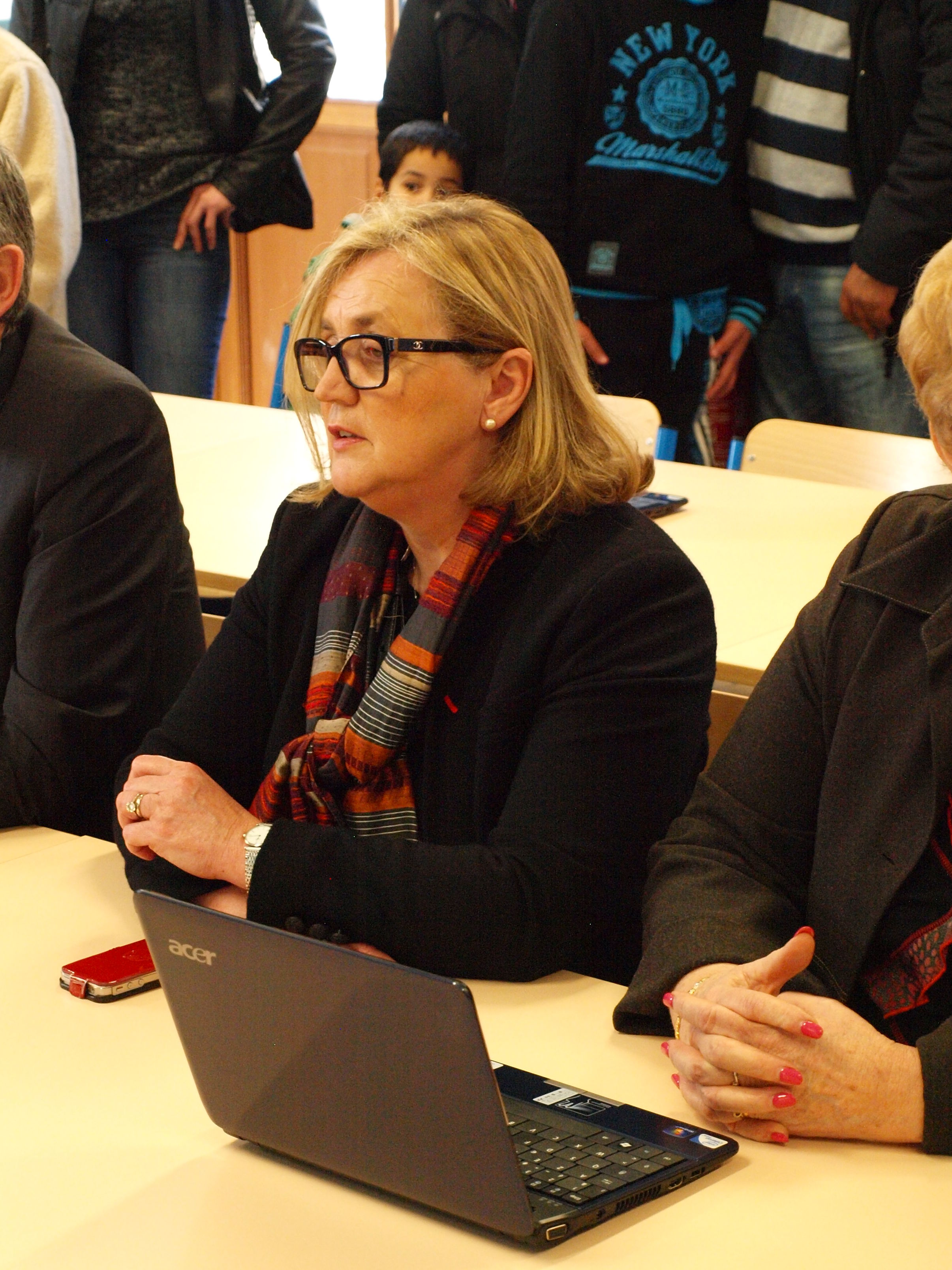
- Marie-Louise Fort in 2013

Mayor of Sens
- In office 5 April 2014 – 24 September 2022
- Preceded by: Michel Fourré
- Succeeded by: Pierre-Antoine de Carville

Member of the National Assembly for Yonne's 3rd constituency
- In office 19 June 2007 – 19 June 2017
- Preceded by: Philippe Auberger
- Succeeded by: Michèle Crouzet

Personal details
- Born: 3 December 1950 Villeneuve-la-Guyard, France
- Died: 24 September 2022 (aged 71) Sens, France
- Party: UMP; The Republicans

Marie-Louise Fort (3 December 1950 – 24 September 2022) was a French politician who was a member of the National Assembly of France.

Fort was born in Villeneuve-la-Guyard on 3 December 1950. She represented the 3rd constituency of the Yonne department, as a member of the Union for a Popular Movement.

== Biography ==
Marie-Louise Fort was mayor of Sens from 2001 to 2008. In 2001, she won the election in the first round against the incumbent Communists. She was a Regional Council of Burgundy from 2004 to 2007.

She was elected in the second round of the 2007 legislative elections on June 17, defeating Daniel Paris, regional councilor (Radical Left Party) and candidate of the united left. Following the appointment of MP Philippe Auberger to the Monetary Policy Council of the Bank of France, the MP successfully sought the UMP nomination before standing before the voters of Yonne.

In 2008, she formed an open list for the municipal elections with running mates from the UMP, Modern Left, the Parti radical valoisien, and independents. However, in a context of a general surge in support for the left, she was ultimately defeated in the second round by Daniel Paris's Parti radical de gauche list, which had outperformed the Socialist Party (France) in the first round and won with 51.77% of the vote.

In 2012, she was re-elected as a representative against Socialist candidate Nicolas Soret with over 55% of the vote.

In February 2013, under the “shared” leadership of Jean-François Copé and François Fillon, she became, along with eleven other prominent figures, deputy secretary-general of the UMP, alongside the incumbent, Marc-Philippe Daubresse.

She became mayor of Sens again following the 2014 municipal elections.

She supports Nicolas Sarkozy in the 2016 Republican presidential primary.

On March 5, 2019, she was the subject of an article in Mediapart concerning the management of the municipality of Sens. An external audit by the independent firm Res-Euro Conseil revealed that the pooling of services between the city of Sens and the Greater Sens area had been carried out in a complex manner and concluded that there had been “institutional harassment.” The next day, Marie-Louise Fort responded to the article, stating that the issue was being misrepresented: some of the critics cited in the article were themselves accused of harassment. On March 7, 2019, it was announced that an administrative investigation was underway, and the Sens public prosecutor's office confirmed that a complaint of harassment had indeed been filed by a city employee. It was for this reason that the mayor had referred the matter to the CHSCT (Health, Safety and Working Conditions Committee) on February 12, in order to take protective measures and expedite the administrative investigation.

During the night of Friday, September 23, 2022, to Saturday, September 24, 2022, Marie-Louise Fort was rushed to Sens Hospital in critical condition. She died there on September 24, 2022, at the age of 71.
