= Constant-Désiré Despradelle =

American architect

Desire Despradelle
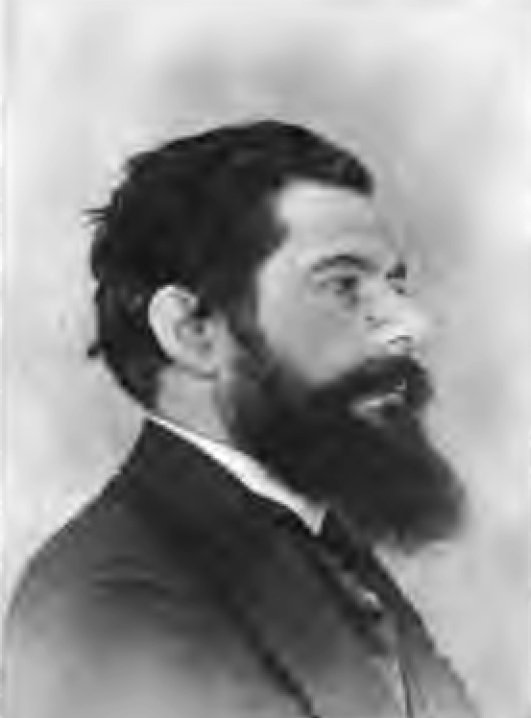
- Born: May 20, 1862; Chaumont, Yonne
- Died: February 8, 1912 (aged 49); Boston, Massachusetts
- Education: École des Beaux-Arts

Constant-Désiré Despradelle (May 20, 1862 – February 8, 1912) was a French-born architect and professor of architecture at Massachusetts Institute of Technology who, through his teaching, influenced a generation of Beaux-Arts style architects and helped to popularize this style throughout North America.

== Biography ==
Born in Chaumont, France, Despradelle was admitted to the École des Beaux-Arts at age twenty, was educated in the atelier of Jean-Louis Pascal, and obtained his diploma in 1886. He won the Grand Prix de Rome in 1889.

In 1893, Despradelle went to Boston, accepting a position as Professor of Design at the Massachusetts Institute of Technology where he served until his death. He taught the Beaux-Arts style and thus influenced the style's continued use throughout North America and Europe until about 1920.

Among architects who studied under him were the Canadians George Allen Ross, William Sutherland Maxwell and Andrew R. Cobb. American architects who trained under him included Francis M. Miller, Ellis Lawrence, Marion Mahony, Ida Annah Ryan, Rose Standish Nichols and Raymond Hood.

A contemporary anecdote in the MIT student paper The Tech may give some indication of his manner and personality: "The Lounge [a column in the paper] secured the services of Mr. Derby as interpreter, and thus equipped sought an audience with Professor Despradelles. After an excited conversation of about fifteen minutes Mr. Derby reported in full to The Lounge as follows, 'Mr. Despradelles says that Sunday is a curious American custom'."

Despradelle was an architect of the early buildings and grounds of the University of California, and served on its advisory board. In Boston he maintained a practice called Codman and Despradelle with his business partner, Stephen Codman. Among their best-known projects is the Berkeley Building on Boylston Street, Boston, now a US national landmark.

Despradelle died in his home in Boston after a long illness.

== Beacon of Progress ==
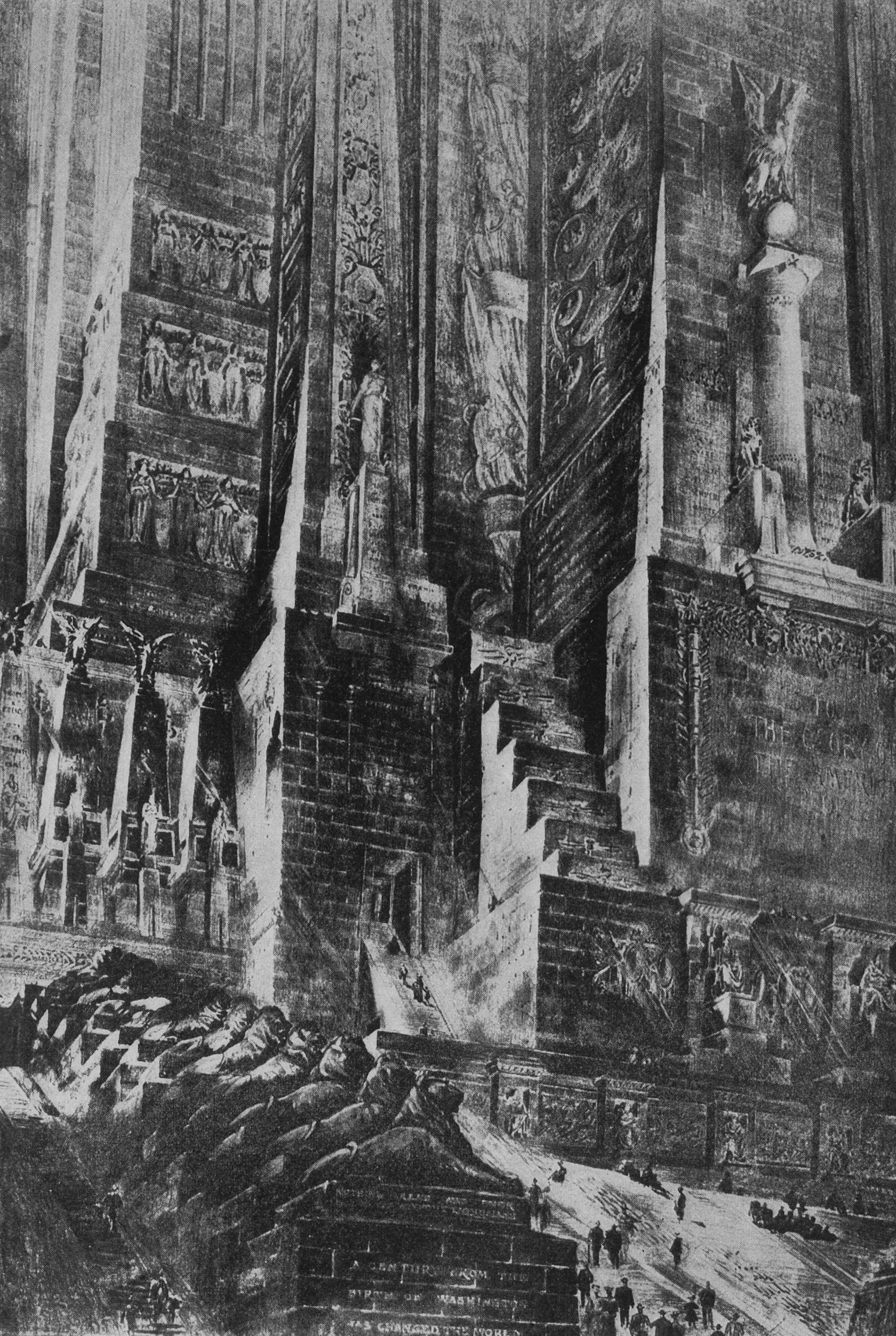
Depiction of the facade of the Despradelle Monument or the Beacon of Progress as envisioned circa 1904. Note the scale as indicated by the figures at lower right.

Despradelle's most famous project was the unrealized "Beacon of Progress" (also simply called "the Beacon"). The Beacon was a towering monument intended for the site in Chicago, Illinois of the Columbian Exposition of 1893. Despradelle designed the Beacon to represent the founding of America, and so it consisted of thirteen obelisks which he said represented the original thirteen colonies. The group of obelisks merged to form a single spire soaring 1,500 feet (approximately 457 metres) above Chicago. This is similar to the height of the Sears Tower, built in the city in 1973.

The Beacon would also represent the future with its benefits to be drawn from "technological leaps forward" in the approaching century. At the apex was to be a brilliant beacon of light with a figurative sculpture called Spirit of Progress to embody what Despradelle called the upward-looking Christian in America. The figure would face Lake Michigan as a monument to the genius of the people and to the dominant feature of their life.

Despradelle continued to refine his design after the Exposition was over, and although the Beacon was never built, the strength of his final 1900 drawings "drew a great deal of attention and had a lasting impact" in the Francophone world. Those drawings retained by the French government from domestically-hosted exhibitions were included in the 1908 Franco-British Exhibition in London, a "tribute to [this] teacher of so many upcoming architects, but also recognition and understanding of Despradelle's creative vision."

== Other works ==
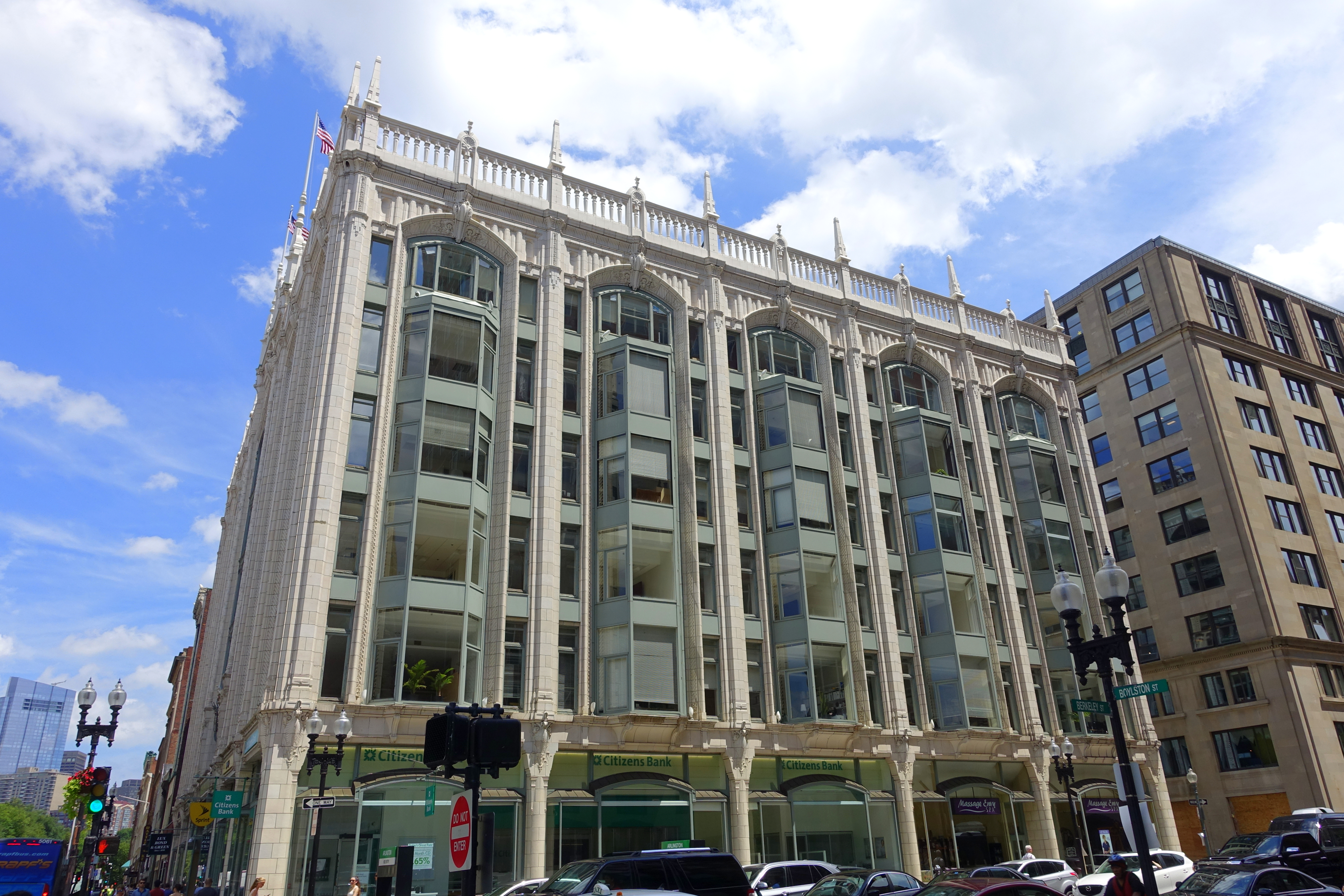
Berkeley Building, 1905, designed with Stephen Codman

Despradelle's other architectural works (in collaboration with Stephen Codman as Codman & Despradelle) include:

- Austin Biscuit Company Bakery (later Stop & Shop Bakery), Boston, 1902, renovated in 2004 by Finegold Alexander & Associates as The Causeway/Strada 234 condominium
- The Berkeley Building, Boston, 1905, also renovated by Finegold Alexander & Associates
- Peter Bent Brigham Hospital, Boston, 1913, now part of Brigham & Women's Hospital
