= Cuttura =

- Part of Coteaux du Lizon
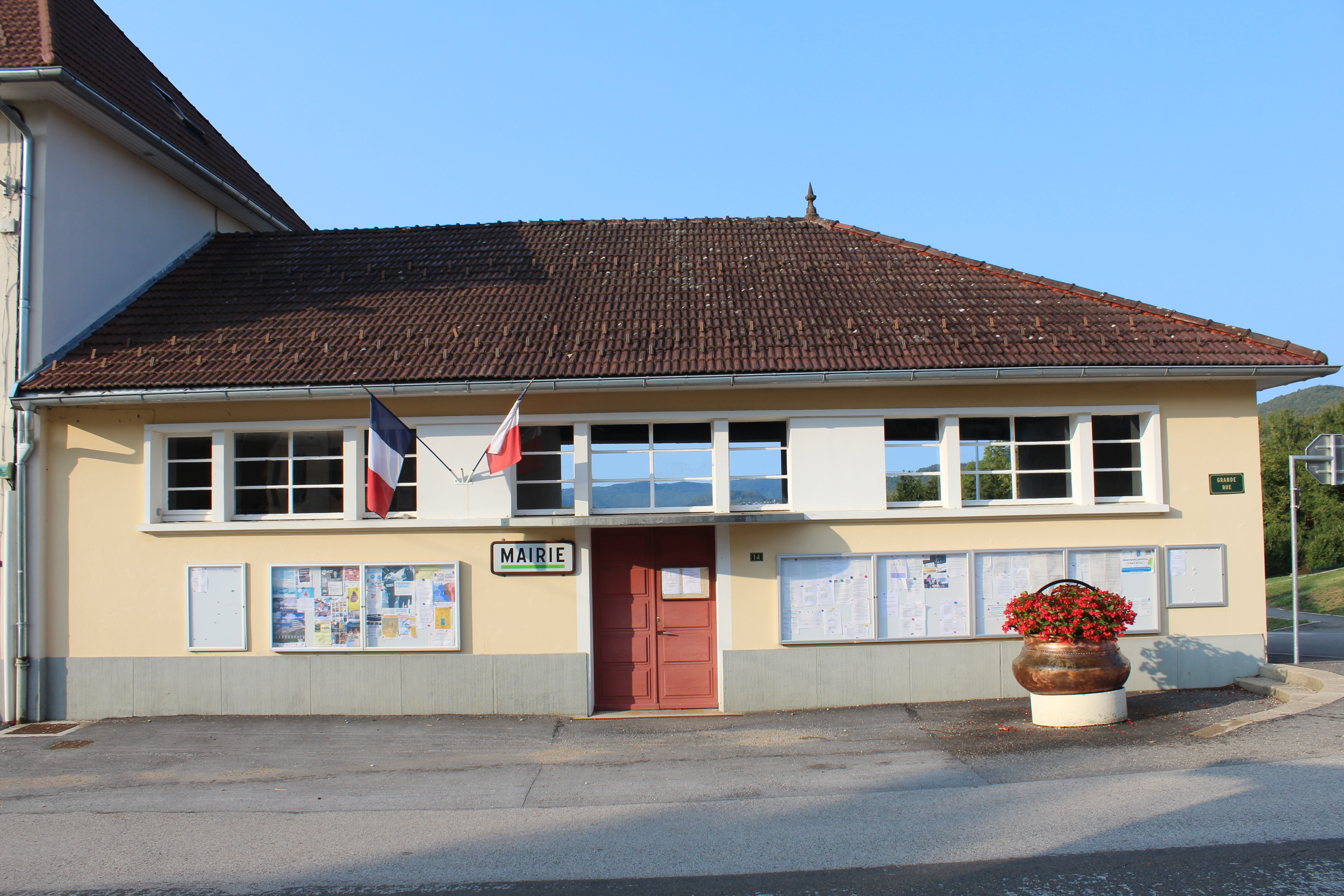
- Town hall
- Location of Cuttura
- Location within France Location within Bourgogne-Franche-Comté
- Coordinates: 46°24′51″N 5°48′44″E
- Country: France
- Region: Bourgogne-Franche-Comté
- Department: Jura
- Arrondissement: Saint-Claude
- Canton: Saint-Claude
- Commune: Coteaux du Lizon
- Area^{1}: 5.95 km^{2} (2.30 sq mi)
- Highest elevation: 900 m (3,000 ft)
- Lowest elevation: 479 m (1,572 ft)
- Population (2023): 299
  - Density: 50.3/km^{2} (130/sq mi)
- Time zone: UTC+01:00 (CET)
  - Summer (DST): UTC+02:00 (CEST)
- Postal code: 39170
- ^{1} French Land Register data, which excludes lakes, ponds, glaciers > 1 km^{2} (0.386 sq mi or 247 acres) and river estuaries.

Cuttura (French pronunciation: [kytyʁa]) is a former commune in the Jura department in Bourgogne-Franche-Comté in eastern France. On 1 January 2017, it was merged into the new commune Coteaux du Lizon.

== See also ==
- Communes of the Jura department
