= Champigny, Yonne =

Champigny
- Commune
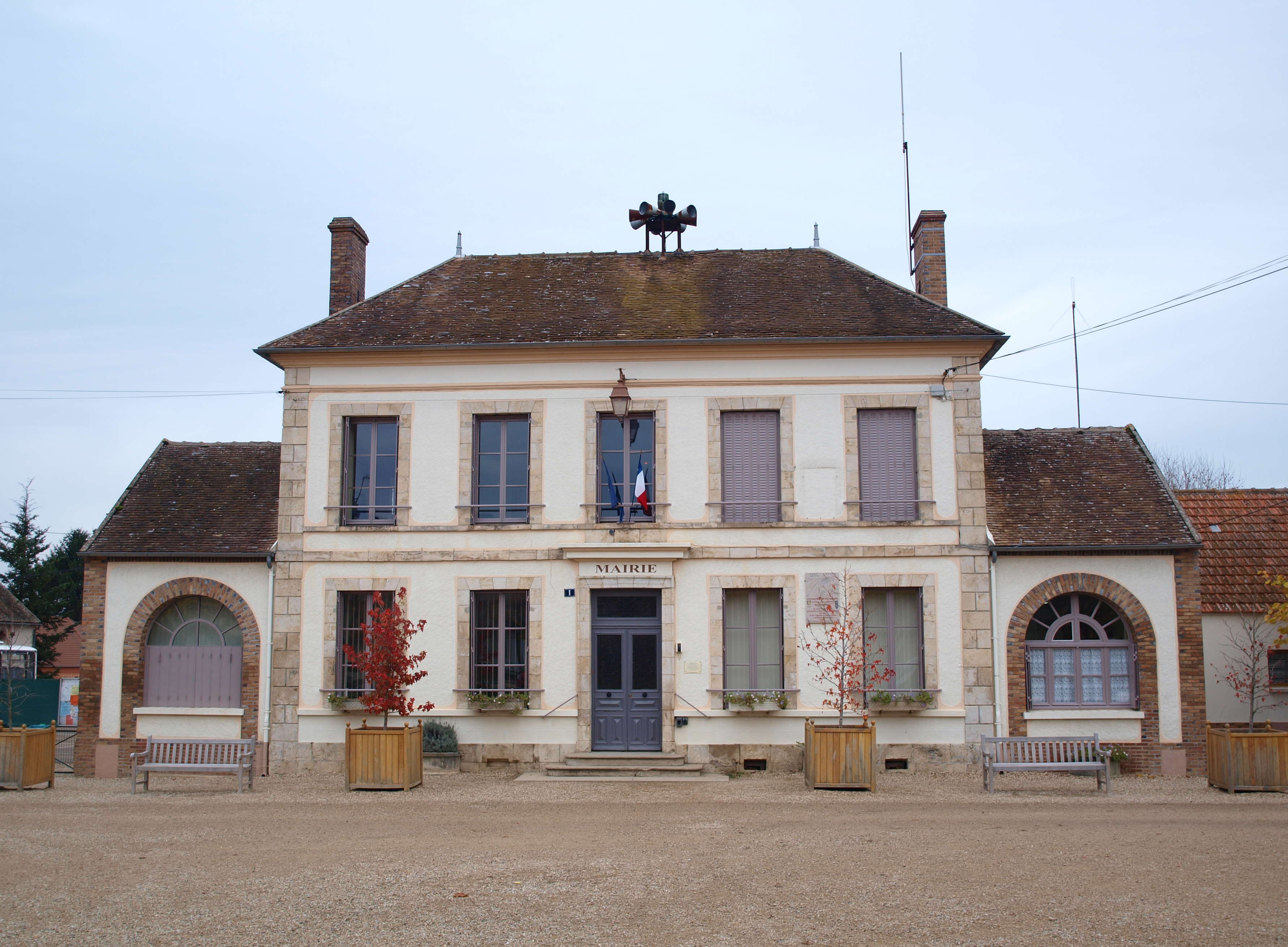
- The town hall in Champigny

- Coat of arms
- Location of Champigny
- Location within France Location within Bourgogne-Franche-Comté
- Coordinates: 48°19′13″N 3°07′42″E
- Country: France
- Region: Bourgogne-Franche-Comté
- Department: Yonne
- Arrondissement: Sens
- Canton: Pont-sur-Yonne

Government
  - Mayor (2020–2026): René Fouet
- Area^{1}: 21.28 km^{2} (8.22 sq mi)
- Highest elevation: 192 m (630 ft)
- Lowest elevation: 54 m (177 ft)
- Population (2023): 2,128
  - Density: 100.0/km^{2} (259.0/sq mi)
- Time zone: UTC+01:00 (CET)
  - Summer (DST): UTC+02:00 (CEST)
- INSEE/Postal code: 89074 /89340
- ^{1} French Land Register data, which excludes lakes, ponds, glaciers > 1 km^{2} (0.386 sq mi or 247 acres) and river estuaries.

Champigny (French pronunciation: [ʃɑ̃piɲi]) is a commune in the Yonne department in Bourgogne-Franche-Comté in north-central France.

== Population ==
Historical population
Year	Pop.	±% p.a.
1968	1,167	—
1975	1,143	−0.30%
1982	1,424	+3.19%
1990	1,782	+2.84%
1999	1,887	+0.64%
2007	2,038	+0.97%
2012	2,240	+1.91%
2017	2,204	−0.32%
2023	2,128	−0.58%
Source: INSEE

== See also ==
- Communes of the Yonne department
