= Coteaux du Lizon =

Commune in Bourgogne-Franche-Comté, France

- Commune
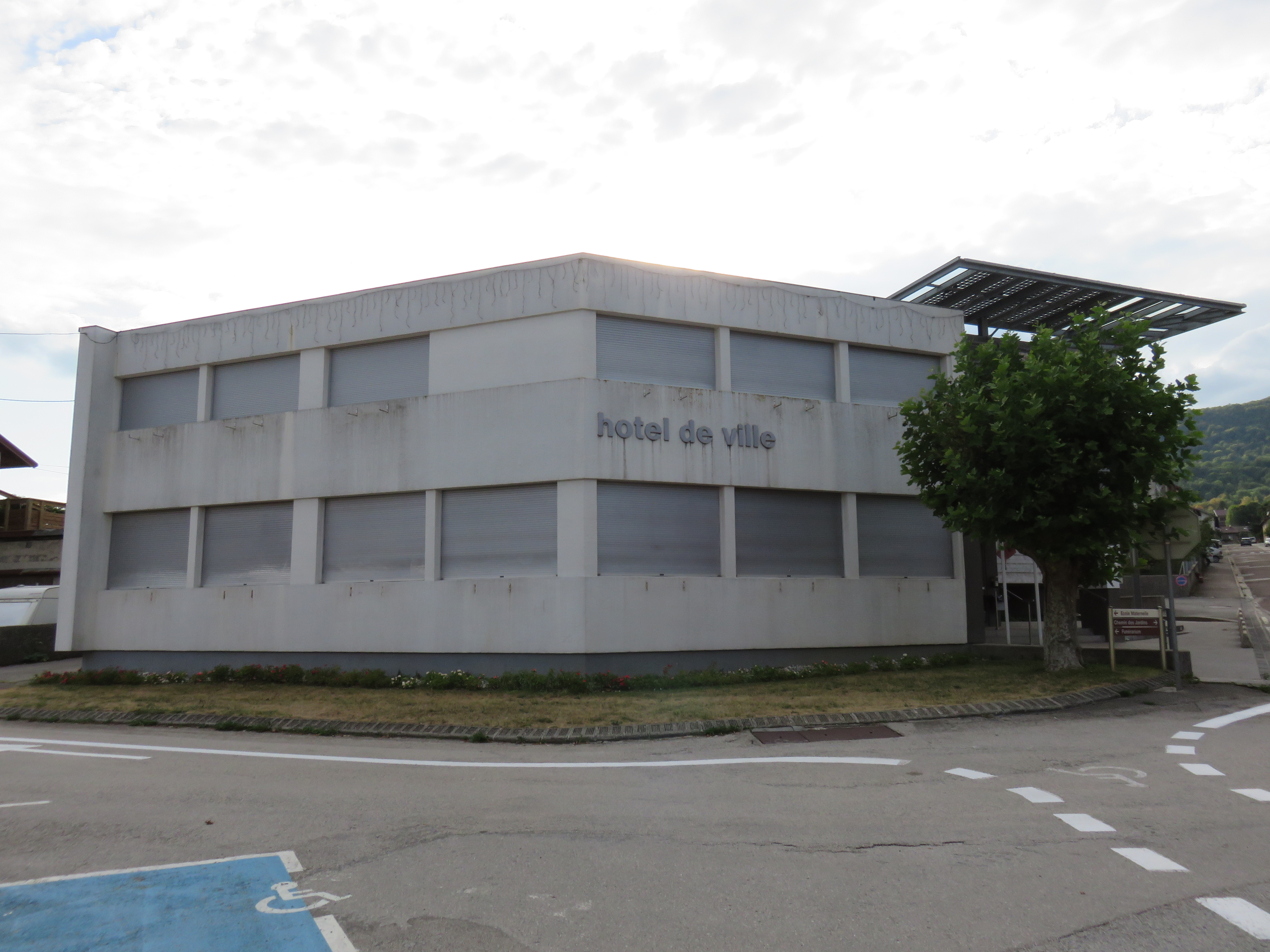
- The town hall in Saint-Lupicin
- Location of Coteaux du Lizon
- Location within France Location within Bourgogne-Franche-Comté
- Coordinates: 46°24′00″N 5°47′35″E
- Country: France
- Region: Bourgogne-Franche-Comté
- Department: Jura
- Arrondissement: Saint-Claude
- Canton: Coteaux du Lizon
- Intercommunality: Haut-Jura Saint-Claude
- Area^{1}: 15.49 km^{2} (5.98 sq mi)
- Population (2023): 2,130
  - Density: 138/km^{2} (356/sq mi)
- Time zone: UTC+01:00 (CET)
  - Summer (DST): UTC+02:00 (CEST)
- INSEE/Postal code: 39491 /39170
- ^{1} French Land Register data, which excludes lakes, ponds, glaciers > 1 km^{2} (0.386 sq mi or 247 acres) and river estuaries.

Coteaux du Lizon (French pronunciation: [kɔto dy lizɔ̃]) is a commune in the department of Jura, eastern France. The municipality was established on 1 January 2017 by merger of the former communes of Saint-Lupicin (the seat) and Cuttura.

== Geography ==
Coteaux du Lizon is a little town located in the Parc naturel régional du Haut-Jura in Bourgogne-Franche-Comté, Eastern France.

The city is cut in two parts by the narrow but deep valley of the Lizon, a small river about 7 km long that cuts a little canyon in the vicinity of Coteaux du Lizon. The commune also has two vast coombs, one of which is towards the hamlet of "Grande-Maison" on the heights of the commune at the foot of the Roche d'Antre, which has climatic characteristics close to those of the coombs of la Brévine or Mouthe. Coteaux du Lizon is surrounded by the Roche d'Antre massif to the west and by the little mountains on which Avignon-lès-Saint-Claude is situated to the east. Although it is in the Haut-Jura, none of the peaks in the territory of the municipality exceeds 1000 m, but nevertheless, at 5 km to the south, there is the Crêt de Surmontant, which peaks at 1065 m. Note that the maximum altitude of its canton is near Lamoura at the Crêt Pela, culminating at 1495m.

The Lizon is the main watercourse crossing the commune. There is also the Cuttura dam, a small water reserve located between Cuttura and Saint-Lupicin. There are many small mountain streams in the municipality.

=== Climate ===
Under the Köppen system, Coteaux du Lizon is pretty close to a warm-summer humid continental climate (Köppen: Dfb) but remains oceanic (Köppen: Cfb) due to its coldest month, slightly above freezing on average due to the winter highs being in the single digits. Coteaux du Lizon experiences a wet climate throughout the year including warm to hot, stormy summers and cold, very snowy winters.

Climate data for Coteaux du Lizon, Bourgogne-Franche-Comté (1995–2020)
Month	Jan	Feb	Mar	Apr	May	Jun	Jul	Aug	Sep	Oct	Nov	Dec	Year
Record high °C (°F)	17.2 (63.0)	20.4 (68.7)	23.7 (74.7)	28.7 (83.7)	32.6 (90.7)	37.2 (99.0)	40.1 (104.2)	39.7 (103.5)	32.6 (90.7)	28.1 (82.6)	22.3 (72.1)	16.3 (61.3)	40.1 (104.2)
Mean maximum °C (°F)	12.5 (54.5)	14.9 (58.8)	20.2 (68.4)	23.9 (75.0)	27.7 (81.9)	31.8 (89.2)	33.2 (91.8)	32.9 (91.2)	27.9 (82.2)	23.8 (74.8)	18.0 (64.4)	13.0 (55.4)	34.4 (93.9)
Mean daily maximum °C (°F)	5.2 (41.4)	7.0 (44.6)	10.9 (51.6)	15.6 (60.1)	19.5 (67.1)	23.6 (74.5)	25.5 (77.9)	25.1 (77.2)	20.9 (69.6)	16.1 (61.0)	9.4 (48.9)	5.6 (42.1)	15.4 (59.7)
Daily mean °C (°F)	1.6 (34.9)	2.5 (36.5)	5.7 (42.3)	9.5 (49.1)	13.5 (56.3)	17.2 (63.0)	19.1 (66.4)	18.8 (65.8)	15.0 (59.0)	11.2 (52.2)	5.6 (42.1)	2.2 (36.0)	10.2 (50.4)
Mean daily minimum °C (°F)	−2 (28)	−2 (28)	0.4 (32.7)	3.4 (38.1)	7.4 (45.3)	10.8 (51.4)	12.7 (54.9)	12.4 (54.3)	9.0 (48.2)	6.3 (43.3)	1.8 (35.2)	−1.3 (29.7)	4.9 (40.8)
Mean minimum °C (°F)	−11.5 (11.3)	−10.0 (14.0)	−6.9 (19.6)	−3.1 (26.4)	0.8 (33.4)	5.1 (41.2)	7.0 (44.6)	6.4 (43.5)	3.0 (37.4)	−1.4 (29.5)	−6.3 (20.7)	−10.6 (12.9)	−14.8 (5.4)
Record low °C (°F)	−20.3 (−4.5)	−22.4 (−8.3)	−18.2 (−0.8)	−6.9 (19.6)	−3.5 (25.7)	0.6 (33.1)	4.2 (39.6)	2.9 (37.2)	−2.4 (27.7)	−8.2 (17.2)	−14.7 (5.5)	−18.9 (−2.0)	−22.4 (−8.3)
Average precipitation mm (inches)	167.6 (6.60)	136.7 (5.38)	138.8 (5.46)	133.2 (5.24)	174.3 (6.86)	133.2 (5.24)	128.4 (5.06)	135.6 (5.34)	135.4 (5.33)	160.5 (6.32)	190.1 (7.48)	182.6 (7.19)	1,816.4 (71.51)
Average snowfall cm (inches)	41.3 (16.3)	32.4 (12.8)	18.7 (7.4)	7.6 (3.0)	1.0 (0.4)	0 (0)	0 (0)	0 (0)	0 (0)	1.2 (0.5)	20.5 (8.1)	33.6 (13.2)	156.3 (61.5)
Average extreme snow depth cm (inches)	22.4 (8.8)	18.7 (7.4)	10.9 (4.3)	4.3 (1.7)	0.7 (0.3)	0 (0)	0 (0)	0 (0)	0 (0)	0.8 (0.3)	13.9 (5.5)	18.6 (7.3)	40.7 (16.0)
Average precipitation days (≥ 1.0 mm)	13.0	11.3	11.4	11.5	13.5	10.3	10.0	9.9	10.1	11.5	12.8	13.6	138.9
Average snowy days	8.4	7.5	4.3	1.1	0.1	0.0	0.0	0.0	0.0	0.2	4.7	7.8	34.1

== Population ==
Population data refer to the commune in its geography as of January 2025.

Historical population
Year	Pop.	±% p.a.
1968	1,648	—
1975	1,807	+1.32%
1982	2,060	+1.89%
1990	2,249	+1.10%
1999	2,426	+0.85%
2007	2,603	+0.88%
2012	2,439	−1.29%
2017	2,397	−0.35%
2023	2,130	−1.95%
Source: INSEE

== See also ==
- Communes of the Jura department
