= Saint-Sérotin =

- Commune
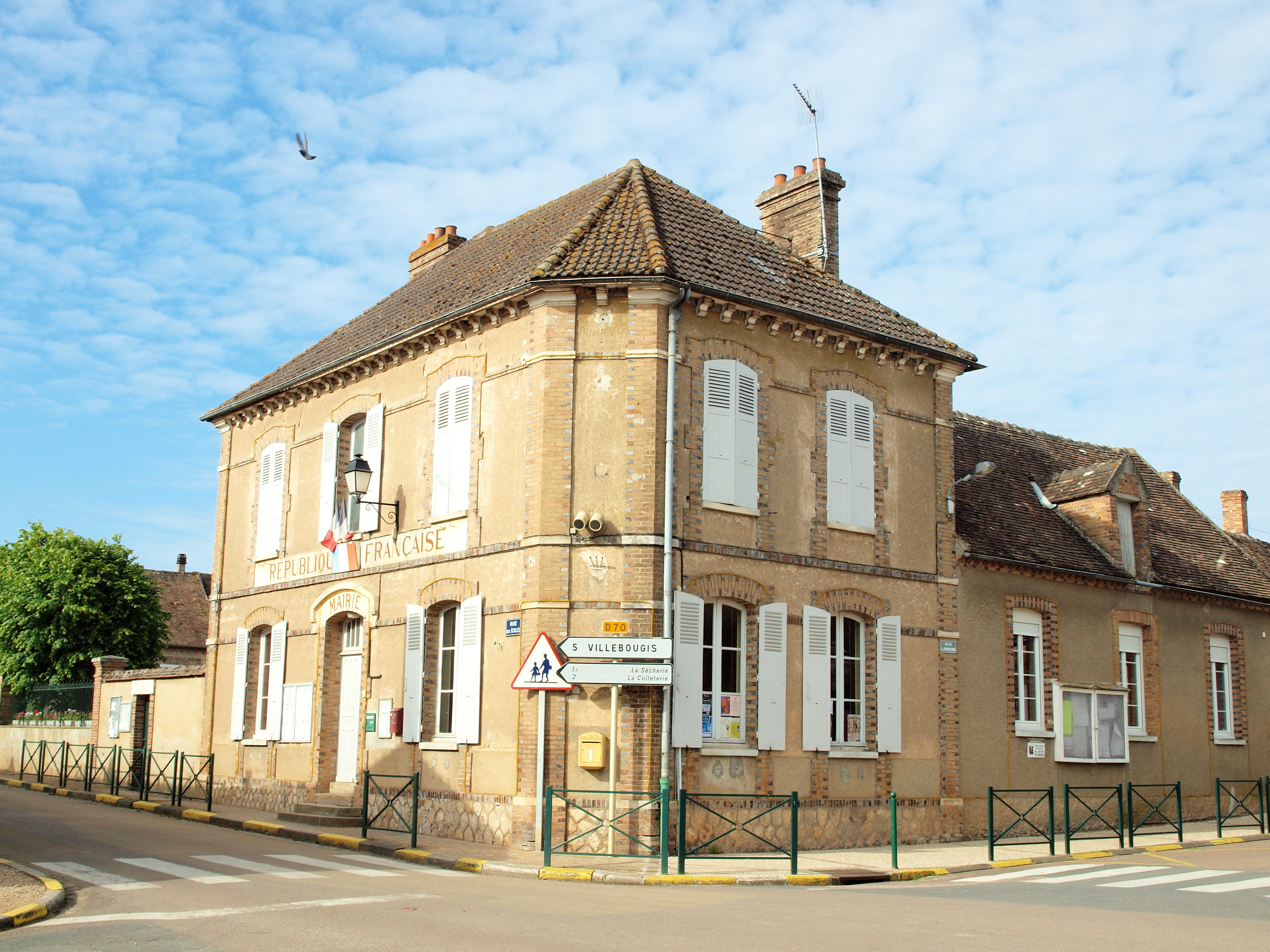
- The town hall in Saint-Sérotin

- Coat of arms
- Location of Saint-Sérotin
- Location within France Location within Bourgogne-Franche-Comté
- Coordinates: 48°14′53″N 3°09′31″E
- Country: France
- Region: Bourgogne-Franche-Comté
- Department: Yonne
- Arrondissement: Sens
- Canton: Pont-sur-Yonne

Government
  - Mayor (2020–2026): Jacques Le Gac
- Area^{1}: 14.10 km^{2} (5.44 sq mi)
- Highest elevation: 195 m (640 ft)
- Lowest elevation: 119 m (390 ft)
- Population (2023): 596
  - Density: 42.3/km^{2} (109/sq mi)
- Time zone: UTC+01:00 (CET)
  - Summer (DST): UTC+02:00 (CEST)
- INSEE/Postal code: 89369 /89140
- ^{1} French Land Register data, which excludes lakes, ponds, glaciers > 1 km^{2} (0.386 sq mi or 247 acres) and river estuaries.

Saint-Sérotin (French pronunciation: [sɛ̃ seʁɔtɛ̃]) is a commune in the Yonne department in Bourgogne-Franche-Comté in north-central France.

== See also ==
- Communes of the Yonne department
