= Departmental Council of Yonne =

Departmental legislature in France

The Departmental Council of Yonne (French: Conseil départemental de l'Yonne) is the deliberative assembly of the French department of Yonne in the region of Bourgogne-Franche-Comté. It includes 42 departemental councillors from the 21 cantons of Yonne, elected for a term of six years. It is chaired by Patrick Gendraud (LR).

The head office of the departmental council is located in Auxerre.

== Budget ==
In 2021, the council has a budget of 455.66 million euros:

Areas	Budget allocated (in million euros)
Integration, Active Solidarity Income (RSA), prevention of exclusions	72.69
Elderly people	69.84
Family and childhood	60.11
People with disabilities	51.40
Roads	50.59
Education	34.28
General resources	32.63
Digital development	18.12
Security	11.18
Culture	8.71
Medico-social prevention	5.75
Transport	5.07
Environment	3.95
Sports and youth	3.74
Housing, rural equipment and infrastructure	3.67
Development	3.05

== Vice Presidents ==
The President of the Departmental Council is assisted by 12 vice-presidents chosen from among the departmental advisers. Each of them has a delegation of authority.

List of vice-presidents of the Yonne Departmental Council (as of 2021)
Order	Name	Party	Canton (constituency)	Delegation
1st	Gregory Dorte	DVD	Pont-sur-Yonne	Education and youth
2nd	Marie-Laure Capitain	DVD	Saint-Florentin	Finance
3rd	Christophe Bonnefond	LR	Auxerre-3	Jobs, roads and real estate
4th	Isabelle Froment-Meurice	UD	Cœur de Puisaye	Tourist and cultural promotion
5th	Alexander Bouchier	UD	Thorigny-sur-Oreuse	Human resources
6th	Elisabeth Frassetto	DVD	Villeneuve-sur-Yonne	Elderly, children and family
7th	François Boucher	UD	Migennes	Attractiveness, partnerships with communities, and sports
8th	Catherine Maudet	UC	Brienon-sur-Armançon	Disabled people
9th	Gilles Pirman	UD	Sens-1	Health
10th	Sonia Patouret	DVD	Avallon	Integration through employment
11th	Pascal Henriat	DVD	Auxerre-4	Digital
12th	Colette Lerman	UCD	Joux-la-Ville	Environment, food and agriculture
