= Michèle Crouzet =

French politician

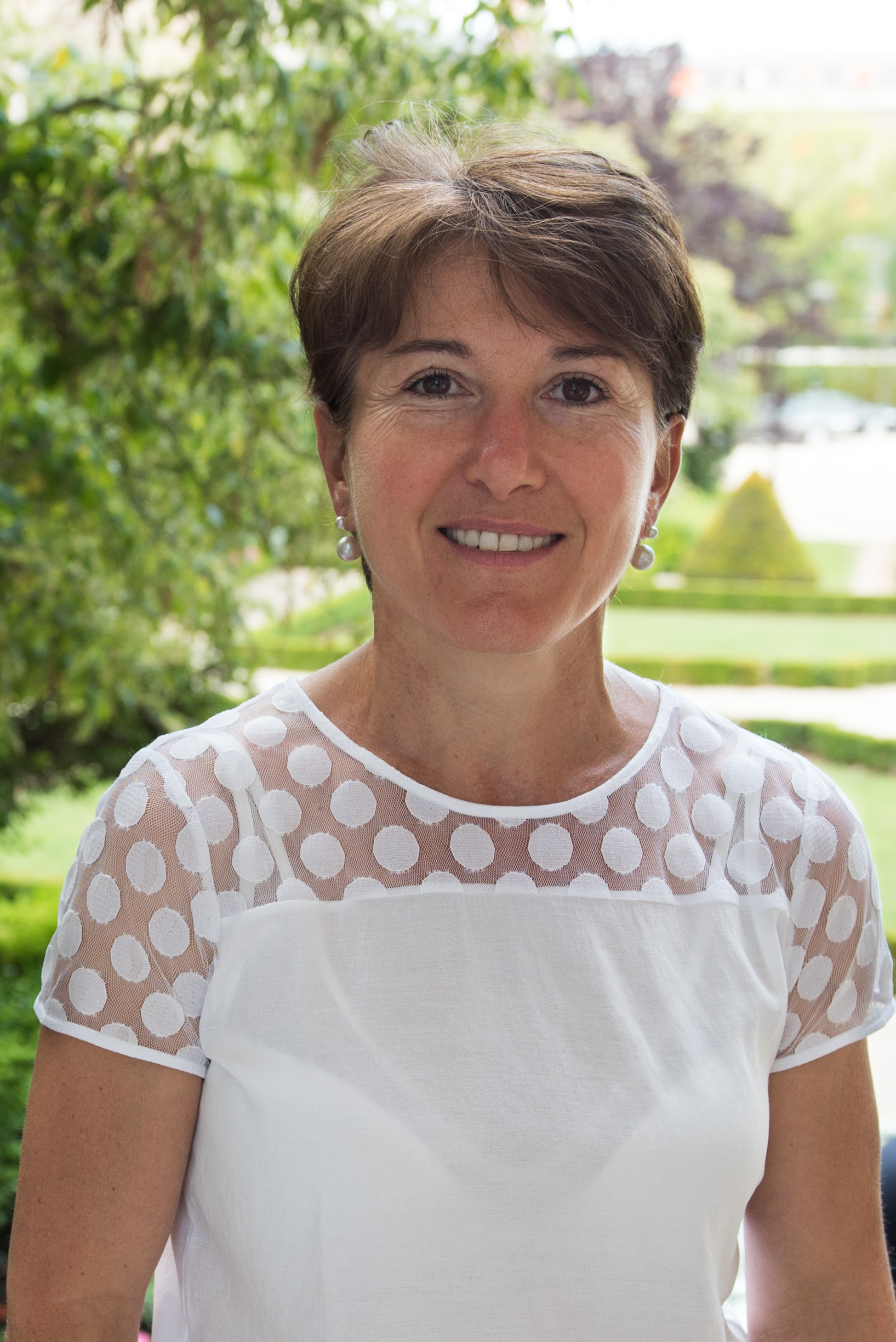

Member of the National Assembly for Yonne's 3rd constituency
- In office 21 June 2017 – 20 June 2022
- Preceded by: Marie-Louise Fort
- Succeeded by: Julien Odoul

Personal details
- Born: 31 August 1967 (age 59) Lormes, France
- Party: LREM (2017-2019); MoDem (since 2020)
- Education: University of Burgundy

Michèle Crouzet (born 31 August 1967) is a French politician of the Democratic Movement (MoDem) who was elected to the French National Assembly on 18 June 2017, representing the department of Yonne. From 2017 until 2019, she was a member of La République En Marche! (LREM).

== Political career ==
Having previously been an active member of the Union of Democrats and Independents (UDI), Crouzet joined LREM in 2017.

In parliament, Crouzet serves on the Committee on Economic Affairs. In addition to her committee assignments, she is a member of the French-Venezuelan Parliamentary Friendship Group. In September 2019, Crouzet announced that she would leave LREM, expressing disagreement in particular on her party’s choice of candidates for the municipal elections.

== Political positions ==
A few months after she took office, Crouzet became known for her disagreements with the party's political line. In early 2019, together with around twenty other LREM members, she proposed to re-establish a solidarity tax on wealth, which had been abolished the previous year.

In July 2019, Crouzet decided not to align with her parliamentary group’s majority and became one of 52 LREM members who abstained from a vote on the French ratification of the European Union’s Comprehensive Economic and Trade Agreement (CETA) with Canada.

== See also ==
- 2017 French legislative election
