= Julien Odoul =

French politician (born 1985)

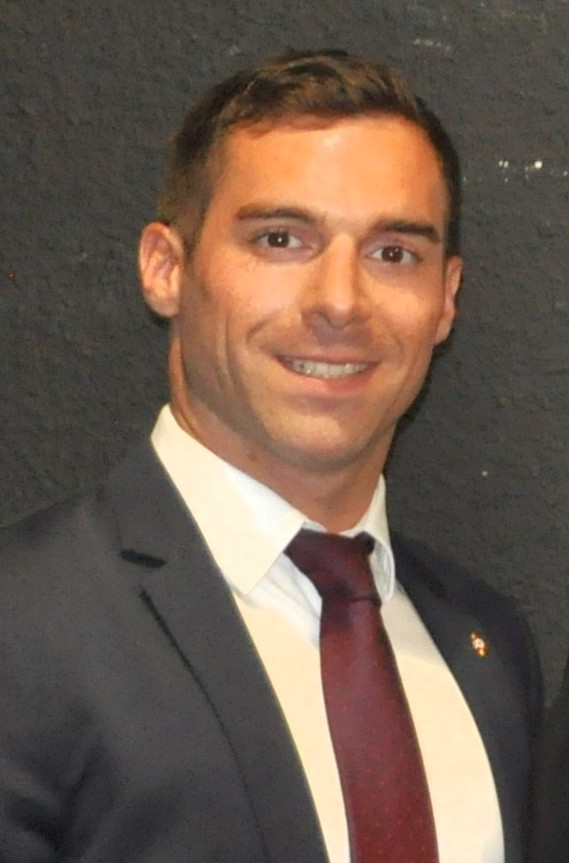
- Odoul in 2019

Member of the National Assembly for Yonne's 3rd constituency
- Incumbent
- Assumed office 22 June 2022
- Preceded by: Michèle Crouzet

Member of the Regional Council of Bourgogne-Franche-Comté
- Incumbent
- Assumed office 4 January 2016
- President: Marie-Guite Dufay

Spokesperson of the National Rally
- Incumbent
- Assumed office 4 July 2021
- President: Marine Le Pen; Jordan Bardella

Personal details
- Born: 8 May 1985 (age 40) Paris, France
- Party: National Rally (2014-present)
- Other political affiliations: Socialist Party (2006-07); New Centre (2009-2014)

Julien Odoul (French pronunciation: [ʒyljɛ̃ ɔdul]; born 8 May 1985) is a French politician. A member of the National Rally (RN), he has represented the 3rd constituency of the Yonne department in the National Assembly since 2022.

== Biography ==
Julien Odoul was born in 1985 in Paris.

A model, he made the cover of the LGBTQ magazine Têtu when he was 21 years old, then three years later, was on the cover of the German gentleman's magazine Gab.

In politics, he joined the Socialist Party in order to support former Prime Minister Laurent Fabius in 2006, then joined the Nouveau Centre in 2009.

He joins the Union of Democrats and Independents (UDI). Collaborator of the centrist deputy-mayor of Issy-les-Moulineaux, André Santini, he worked for him until 2011. In 2012, he was a centrist candidate in the Val-de-Marne's 10th constituency.

In 2014, he joined the National Front. In 2017, Julien Odoul took over as head of the National Rally Group in Bourgogne-Franche-Comté, then joined the party's national office in 2018. In 2019, he made comments during a council meeting along with a demand that a visitor take off her hijab. The visitor who was chaperoning a school trip was the mother of one of the children. Odoul's demand and remarks was rebuffed by council members with the council president, Marie-Guite Dufay, pointing out that neither French national law nor the regional council rules prohibited people from wearing veils during meetings.

=== Member of the Assemblée Nationale ===
As a member of the National Rally (RN), he has represented the 3rd constituency of the Yonne department in the National Assembly since 2022.

On campaign in the July 2024 French legislative elections for which he was the official RN spokesman, Odoul said that if the RN formed the government after the vote, they would ban the hijab in the public square.
