= Courtois-sur-Yonne =

- Commune
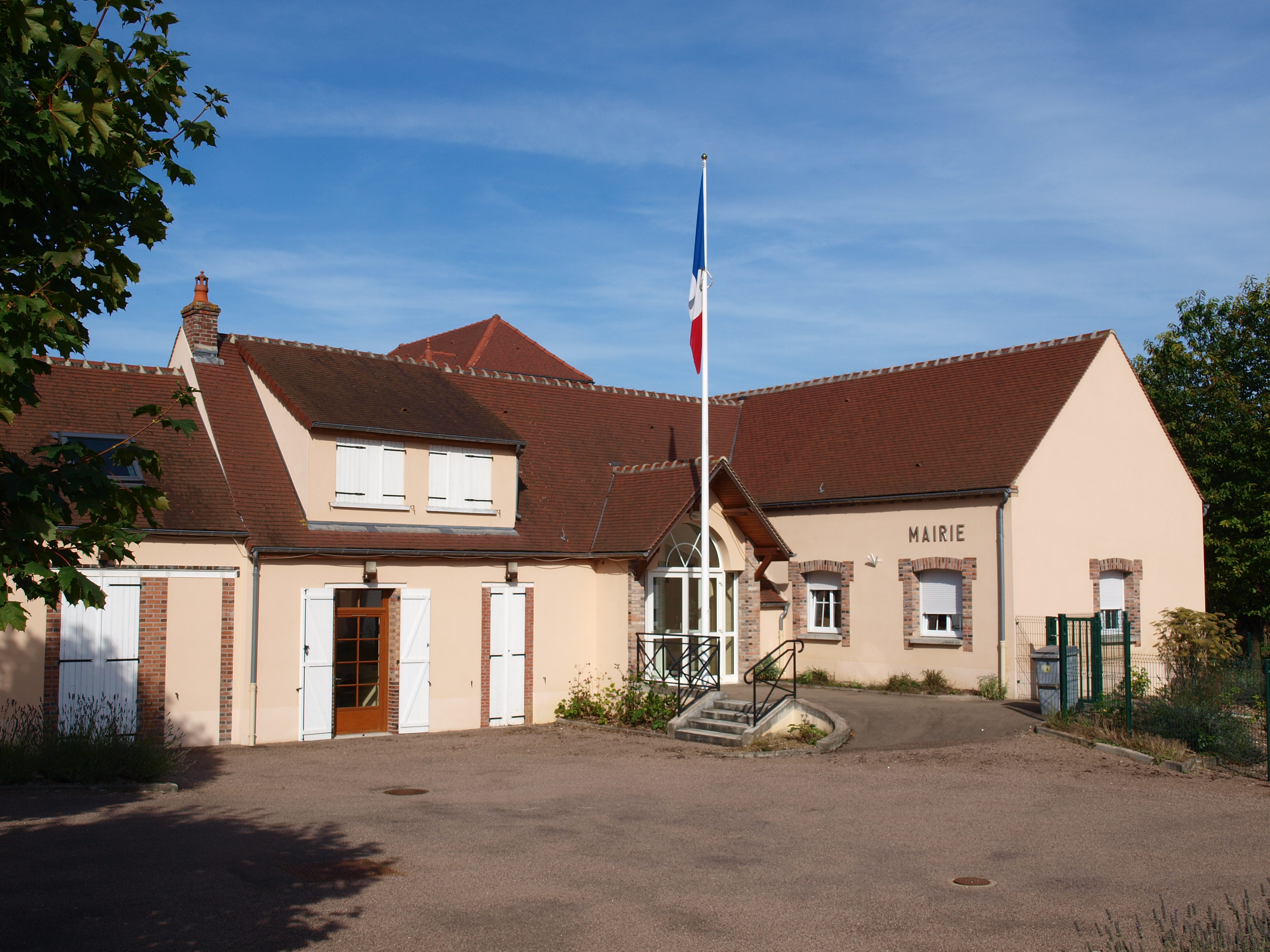
- The town hall in Courtois-sur-Yonne

- Coat of arms
- Location of Courtois-sur-Yonne
- Location within France Location within Bourgogne-Franche-Comté
- Coordinates: 48°13′37″N 3°15′22″E
- Country: France
- Region: Bourgogne-Franche-Comté
- Department: Yonne
- Arrondissement: Sens
- Canton: Pont-sur-Yonne
- Intercommunality: CA Grand Sénonais

Government
  - Mayor (2020–2026): Eric Berthault
- Area^{1}: 4.29 km^{2} (1.66 sq mi)
- Highest elevation: 172 m (564 ft)
- Lowest elevation: 62 m (203 ft)
- Population (2023): 783
  - Density: 183/km^{2} (473/sq mi)
- Time zone: UTC+01:00 (CET)
  - Summer (DST): UTC+02:00 (CEST)
- INSEE/Postal code: 89127 /89100
- ^{1} French Land Register data, which excludes lakes, ponds, glaciers > 1 km^{2} (0.386 sq mi or 247 acres) and river estuaries.

Courtois-sur-Yonne (French pronunciation: [kuʁtwa syʁ jɔn], lit. 'Courtois on Yonne') is a commune in the Yonne department in Bourgogne-Franche-Comté in north-central France.

== See also ==
- Communes of the Yonne department
