= Villemanoche =

- Commune
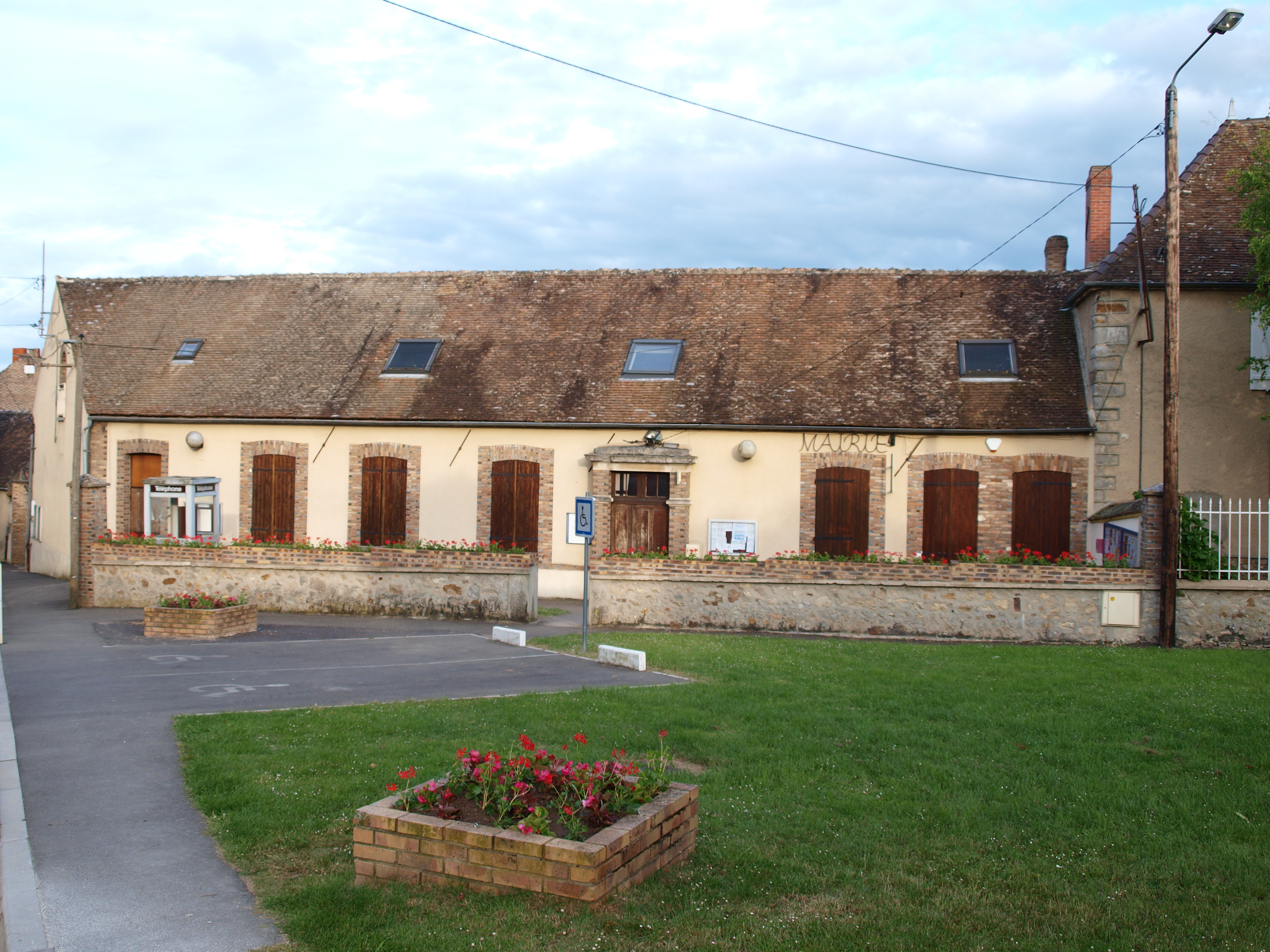
- The town hall in Villemanoche
- Location of Villemanoche
- Location within France Location within Bourgogne-Franche-Comté
- Coordinates: 48°18′04″N 3°10′56″E
- Country: France
- Region: Bourgogne-Franche-Comté
- Department: Yonne
- Arrondissement: Sens
- Canton: Pont-sur-Yonne

Government
  - Mayor (2021–2026): François Goglins
- Area^{1}: 14.39 km^{2} (5.56 sq mi)
- Highest elevation: 194 m (636 ft)
- Lowest elevation: 57 m (187 ft)
- Population (2023): 667
  - Density: 46.4/km^{2} (120/sq mi)
- Time zone: UTC+01:00 (CET)
  - Summer (DST): UTC+02:00 (CEST)
- INSEE/Postal code: 89456 /89140
- ^{1} French Land Register data, which excludes lakes, ponds, glaciers > 1 km^{2} (0.386 sq mi or 247 acres) and river estuaries.

Villemanoche (French pronunciation: [vilmanɔʃ]) is a commune in the Yonne department in Bourgogne-Franche-Comté in north-central France.

== See also ==
- Communes of the Yonne department
