= Villeperrot =

- Commune
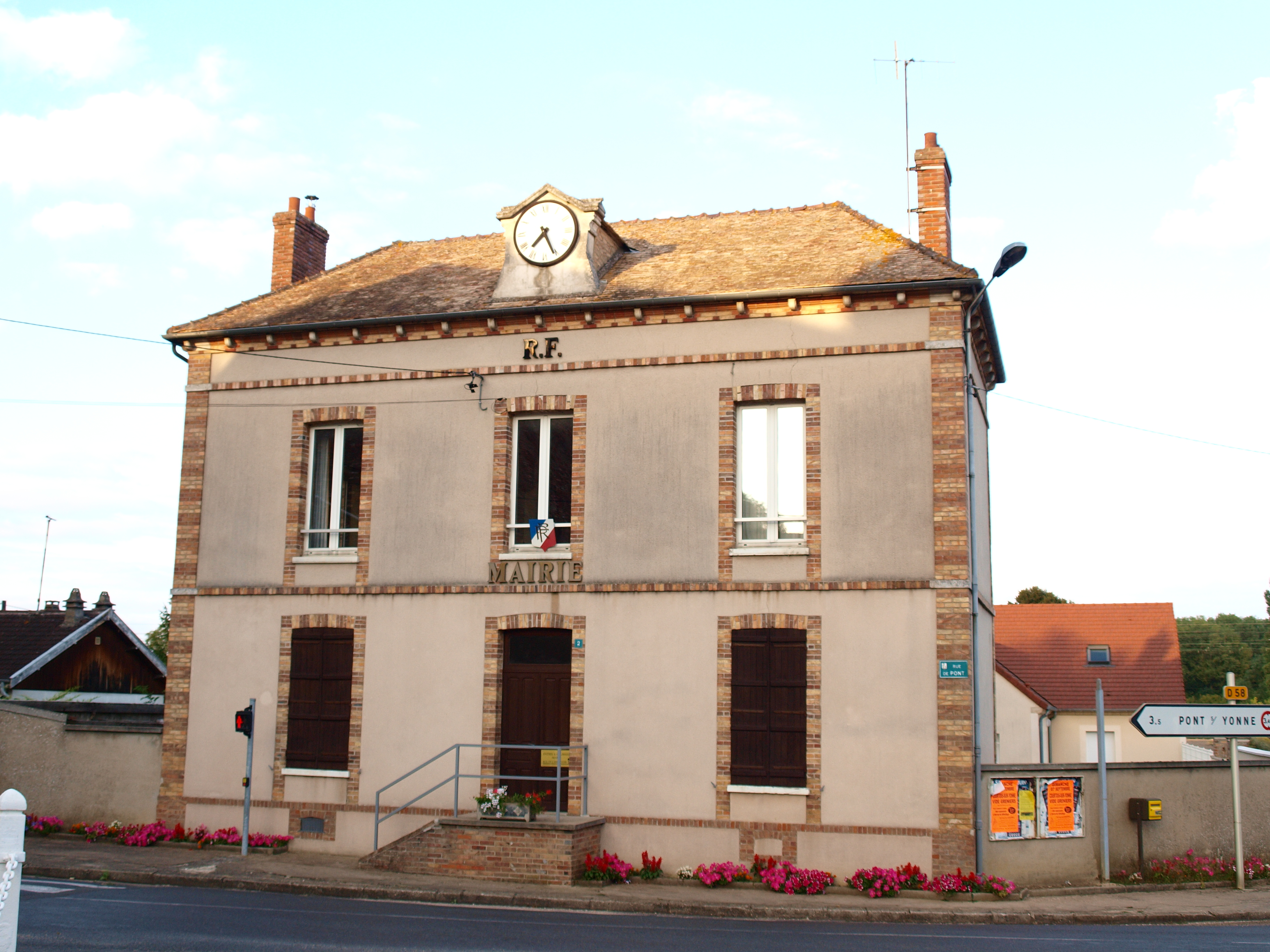
- The town hall in Villeperrot

- Coat of arms
- Location of Villeperrot
- Location within France Location within Bourgogne-Franche-Comté
- Coordinates: 48°15′46″N 3°13′46″E
- Country: France
- Region: Bourgogne-Franche-Comté
- Department: Yonne
- Arrondissement: Sens
- Canton: Pont-sur-Yonne

Government
  - Mayor (2020–2026): Tatiana Hautecoeur
- Area^{1}: 8.15 km^{2} (3.15 sq mi)
- Highest elevation: 189 m (620 ft)
- Lowest elevation: 61 m (200 ft)
- Population (2023): 282
  - Density: 34.6/km^{2} (89.6/sq mi)
- Time zone: UTC+01:00 (CET)
  - Summer (DST): UTC+02:00 (CEST)
- INSEE/Postal code: 89465 /89140
- ^{1} French Land Register data, which excludes lakes, ponds, glaciers > 1 km^{2} (0.386 sq mi or 247 acres) and river estuaries.

Villeperrot (French pronunciation: [vilpɛʁo]) is a commune in the Yonne department in Bourgogne-Franche-Comté in north-central France.

== See also ==
- Communes of the Yonne department
