= Villenavotte =

- Commune
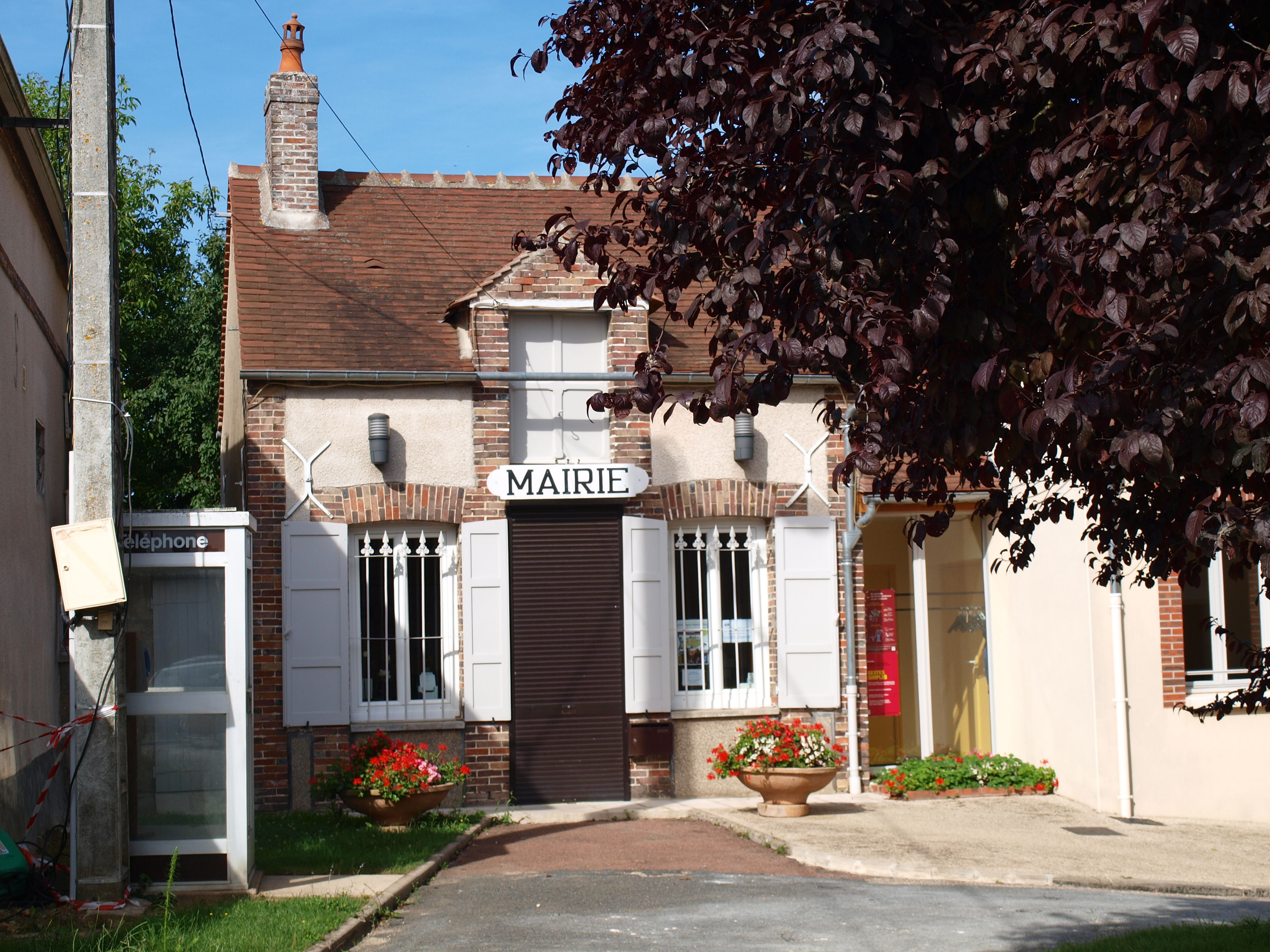
- The town hall in Villenavotte
- Location of Villenavotte
- Location within France Location within Bourgogne-Franche-Comté
- Coordinates: 48°14′59″N 3°14′21″E
- Country: France
- Region: Bourgogne-Franche-Comté
- Department: Yonne
- Arrondissement: Sens
- Canton: Pont-sur-Yonne

Government
  - Mayor (2020–2026): Claude Laventureux
- Area^{1}: 2.22 km^{2} (0.86 sq mi)
- Highest elevation: 172 m (564 ft)
- Lowest elevation: 62 m (203 ft)
- Population (2023): 162
  - Density: 73.0/km^{2} (189/sq mi)
- Time zone: UTC+01:00 (CET)
  - Summer (DST): UTC+02:00 (CEST)
- INSEE/Postal code: 89458 /89140
- ^{1} French Land Register data, which excludes lakes, ponds, glaciers > 1 km^{2} (0.386 sq mi or 247 acres) and river estuaries.

Villenavotte (French pronunciation: [vilnavɔt]) is a commune in the Yonne department in Bourgogne-Franche-Comté in north-central France.

== See also ==
- Communes of the Yonne department
