= Villeneuve-la-Guyard =

- Commune
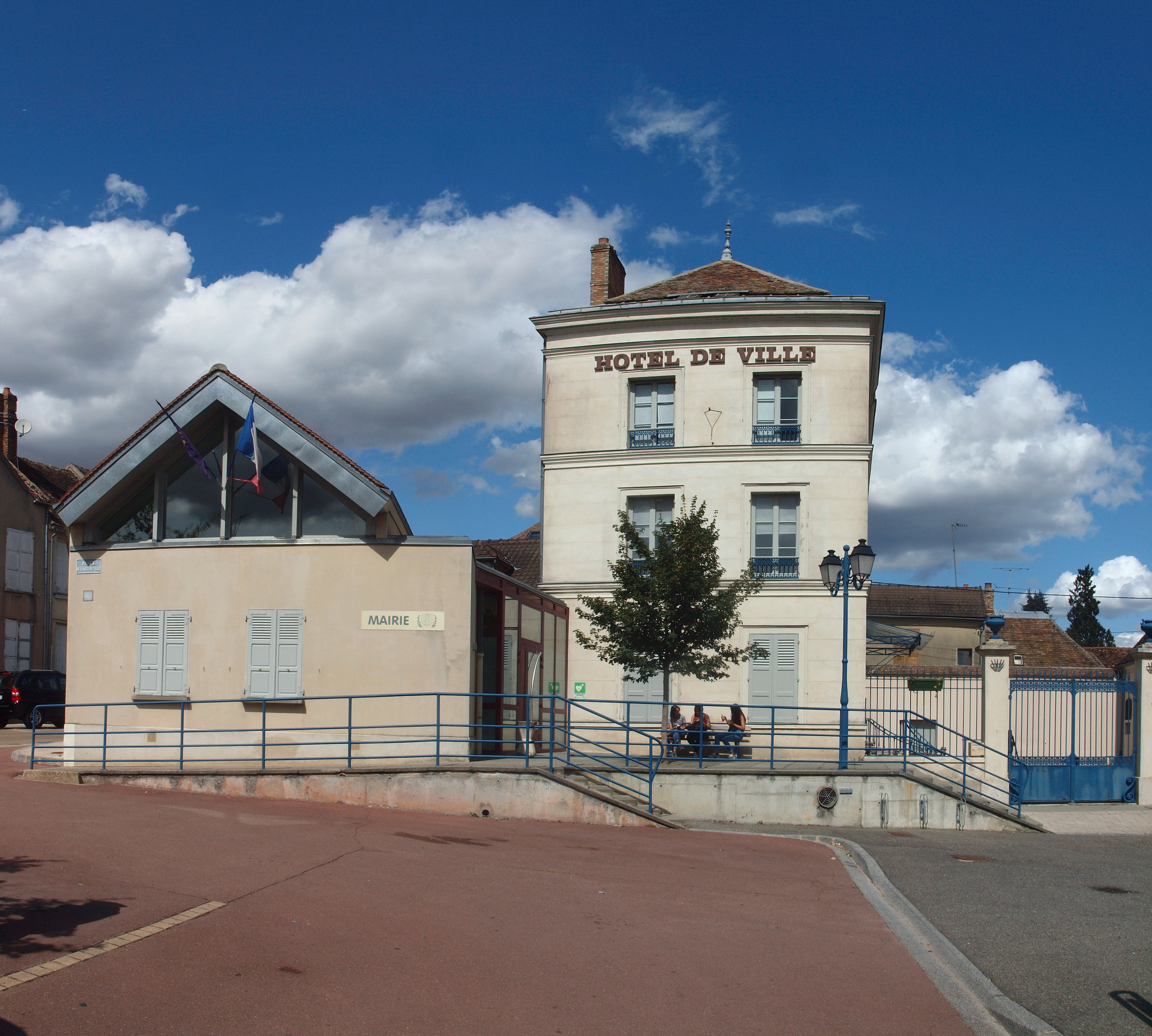
- The town hall in Villeneuve-la-Guyard

- Coat of arms
- Location of Villeneuve-la-Guyard
- Location within France Location within Bourgogne-Franche-Comté
- Coordinates: 48°20′27″N 3°03′55″E
- Country: France
- Region: Bourgogne-Franche-Comté
- Department: Yonne
- Arrondissement: Sens
- Canton: Pont-sur-Yonne

Government
  - Mayor (2020–2026): Dominique Bourreau
- Area^{1}: 16.62 km^{2} (6.42 sq mi)
- Highest elevation: 158 m (518 ft)
- Lowest elevation: 52 m (171 ft)
- Population (2023): 3,455
  - Density: 207.9/km^{2} (538.4/sq mi)
- Time zone: UTC+01:00 (CET)
  - Summer (DST): UTC+02:00 (CEST)
- INSEE/Postal code: 89460 /89340
- ^{1} French Land Register data, which excludes lakes, ponds, glaciers > 1 km^{2} (0.386 sq mi or 247 acres) and river estuaries.

Villeneuve-la-Guyard (French pronunciation: [vilnœv la ɡɥijaʁ]) is a commune in the Yonne department in Bourgogne-Franche-Comté in north-central France.

== Population ==
Historical population
Year	Pop.	±% p.a.
1968	1,655	—
1975	1,777	+1.02%
1982	1,805	+0.22%
1990	2,377	+3.50%
1999	2,576	+0.90%
2007	2,924	+1.60%
2012	3,321	+2.58%
2017	3,465	+0.85%
2023	3,455	−0.05%
Source: INSEE

== See also ==
- Communes of the Yonne department
