= Saint-Lupicin =

- Part of Coteaux du Lizon
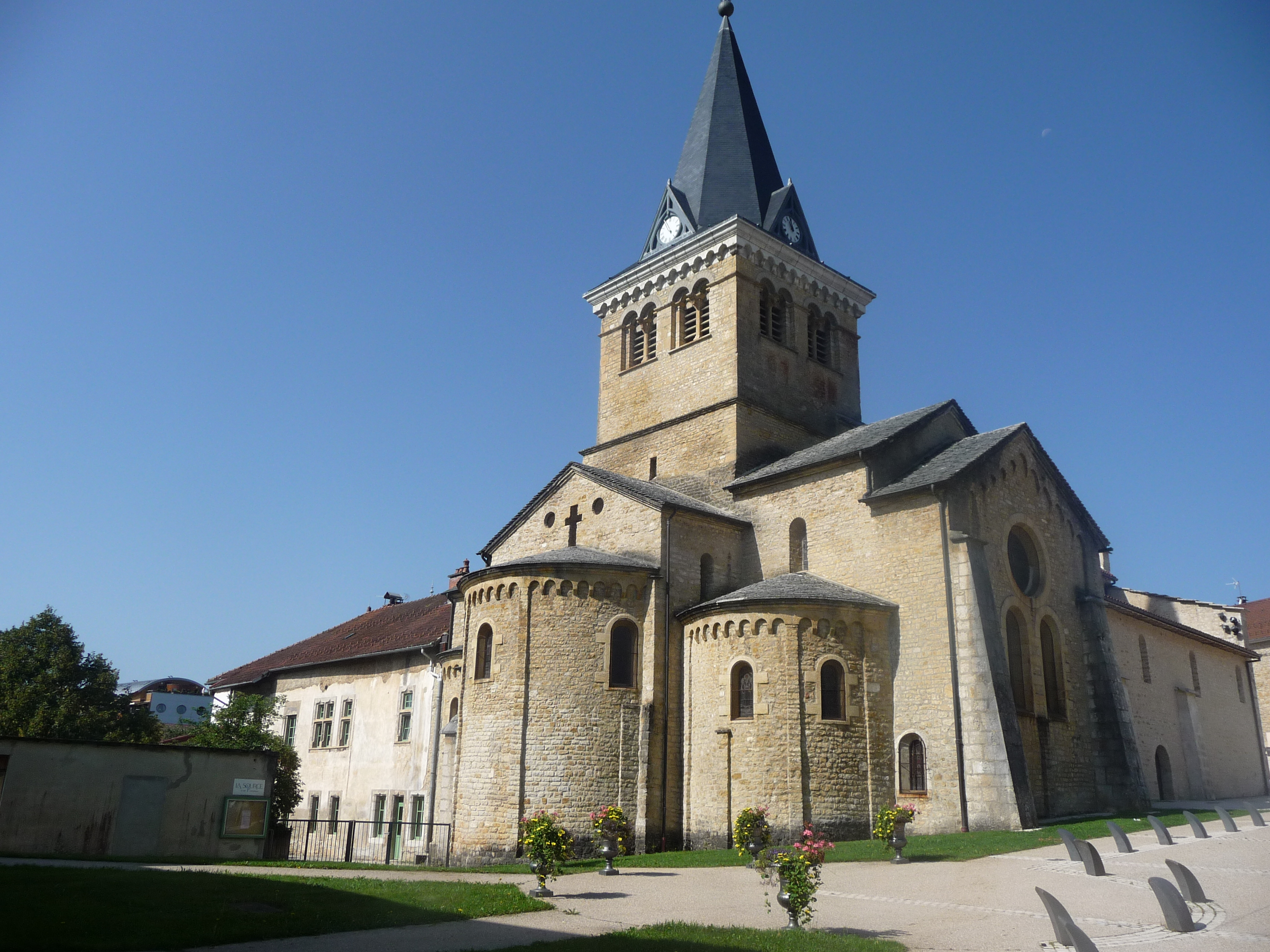

- Coat of arms
- Location of Saint-Lupicin
- Location within France Location within Bourgogne-Franche-Comté
- Coordinates: 46°24′01″N 5°47′33″E
- Country: France
- Region: Bourgogne-Franche-Comté
- Department: Jura
- Arrondissement: Saint-Claude
- Canton: Saint-Lupicin
- Commune: Coteaux du Lizon
- Area^{1}: 9.54 km^{2} (3.68 sq mi)
- Highest elevation: 915 m (3,002 ft)
- Lowest elevation: 410 m (1,350 ft)
- Population (2022): 1,845
  - Density: 193/km^{2} (501/sq mi)
- Time zone: UTC+01:00 (CET)
  - Summer (DST): UTC+02:00 (CEST)
- Postal code: 39170
- ^{1} French Land Register data, which excludes lakes, ponds, glaciers > 1 km^{2} (0.386 sq mi or 247 acres) and river estuaries.

Saint-Lupicin (French pronunciation: [sɛ̃ lypisɛ̃]) is a former commune in the Jura department in the Bourgogne-Franche-Comté region in eastern France. On 1 January 2017, it was merged into the new commune Coteaux du Lizon.

== Population ==
Historical population

Year	Pop.	±% p.a.
1831	696	—
1836	681	−0.43%
1841	694	+0.38%
1846	714	+0.57%
1851	671	−1.23%
1856	641	−0.91%
1861	629	−0.38%
1866	646	+0.53%
1872	681	+0.88%
1876	716	+1.26%
1881	797	+2.17%
1886	782	−0.38%
1891	827	+1.13%
1896	803	−0.59%
1901	819	+0.40%
1906	848	+0.70%

Year	Pop.	±% p.a.
1911	947	+2.23%
1921	897	−0.54%
1926	994	+2.07%
1931	1,106	+2.16%
1936	1,133	+0.48%
1946	1,128	−0.04%
1954	1,157	+0.32%
1962	1,286	+1.33%
1968	1,478	+2.35%
1975	1,648	+1.57%
1982	1,882	+1.91%
1990	2,007	+0.81%
1999	2,081	+0.40%
2006	2,222	+0.94%
2022	1,845	−1.16%

Source: EHESS and INSEE

== See also ==
- Communes of the Jura department
