= Yonne's 3rd constituency =

Constituency of the National Assembly of France

3rd constituency of Yonne
- inline Constituency of the National Assembly of France

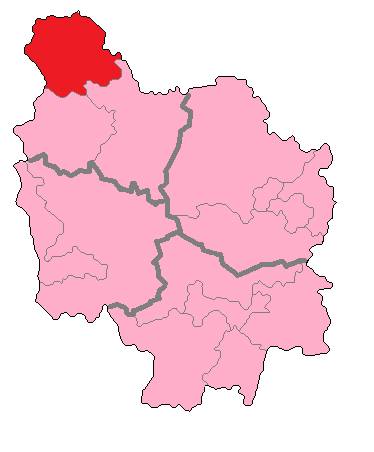
- Yonne's 3rd Constituency shown within Burgundy
- Deputy: Julien Odoul; RN
- Department: Yonne
- Cantons: Cerisiers, Chéroy, Joigny, Pont-sur-Yonne, Saint-Julien-du-Sault, Sens-Nord-Est, Sens-Ouest, Sens-Sud-Est, Sergines, Villeneuve-l'Archevêque, Villeneuve-sur-Yonne
- Registered voters: 89,161

The 3rd constituency of the Yonne is a French legislative constituency in the Yonne département.

== Description ==
Yonne's 3rd constituency covers the north west of the department around the small city of Sens.

Politically the seat was a strong hold of the Gaullist UMP until 2017.

== Historic Representation ==
Election	Member	Party
2002	Phillippe Auberger	UMP
2007	Marie-Louise Fort	UMP
2012	Marie-Louise Fort	UMP
2017	Michèle Crouzet	LREM
2020	Michèle Crouzet	MoDem
2022	Julien Odoul	RN
2024	Julien Odoul	RN

== Election results ==
=== 2024 ===
Legislative Election 2024: Yonne's 3rd constituency
Party	Candidate	Votes	%	±%
DVD	Grégoire Weigel	2,271	3.99	n/a
DVG	Jean-Charles Kermin	350	0.61	n/a
LO	Simonne Pallant	541	0.95	n/a
MoDem (Ensemble)	Michèle Crouzet	9,973	17.51	−4.00
PS (NFP)	Nicolas Soret	14,530	25.51	n/a
RN	Julien Odoul	28,735	50.44	15.27
REC	Annik Vilbois	568	1.00	−2.45
Turnout		56,968	97.37	+49.26
Registered electors		89,716		
RN hold				

=== 2022 ===
Legislative Election 2022: Yonne's 3rd constituency
Party	Candidate	Votes	%	±%
RN	Julien Odoul	14,897	35.17	+9.56
MoDem (Ensemble)	Michèle Crouzet	9,114	21.52	-7.13
LFI (NUPÉS)	Manon Dené	8,126	19.18	+0.02
LR (UDC)	Gilles Pirman	4,588	10.83	−4.59
REC	Laurence Louis-Stokober	1,461	3.45	N/A
DVE	Florence Henry	1,061	2.50	N/A
HOR	Véronique Frantz*	1,013	2.39	N/A
Others	N/A	2,098	-	−
Turnout		42,358	48.11	+1.03
2nd round result
RN	Julien Odoul	21,429	55.84	+11.44
MoDem (Ensemble)	Michèle Crouzet	16,949	44.16	−11.44
Turnout		38,378	46.25	+5.78
RN gain from LREM				

* Frantz stood as a dissident member of Horizons, without the support of the party or the Ensemble alliance.

=== 2017 ===
Legislative Election 2017: Yonne's 3rd constituency
Party	Candidate	Votes	%	±%
LREM	Michèle Crouzet	12,028	28.65	
FN	Julien Odoul	10,749	25.61	
LR	Clarisse Quentin	6,474	15.42	
LFI	Isabelle Michaud	4,307	10.26	
DVD	Delphine Gremy	2,640	6.29	
PS	Dominique Bourreau	2,206	5.25	
EELV	Bernard Beherec	844	2.01	
Others	N/A	2,732		
Turnout		41,980	47.08	
2nd round result
LREM	Michèle Crouzet	20,058	55.60	
FN	Julien Odoul	16,020	44.40	
Turnout		36,078	40.47	
LREM gain from LR				

=== 2012 ===
Legislative Election 2012: Yonne's 3rd constituency
Party	Candidate	Votes	%	±%
UMP	Marie-Louise Fort	18,837	36.71	
PS	Nicolas Soret	14,393	28.05	
FN	Edouard Ferrand	9,883	19.26	
PRG	Daniel Paris	4,311	8.40	
FG	Elodie Delion	1,592	3.10	
Others	N/A	2,296		
Turnout		51,312	57.55	
2nd round result
UMP	Marie-Louise Fort	27,304	55.28	
PS	Nicolas Soret	22,092	44.72	
Turnout		49,396	55.40	
UMP hold				

=== 2007 ===
Legislative Election 2007: Yonne's 3rd constituency
Party	Candidate	Votes	%	±%
UMP	Marie-Louise Fort	19,996	37.49	
PRG	Daniel Paris	11,396	21.37	
MoDem	Alexandre Bouchier	5,595	10.49	
DVD	Guy Languillat	4,224	7.92	
FN	Edouard Ferrand	3,972	7.45	
Far left	Alain Ladrange	1,646	3.09	
LV	Jean-Luc Girault	1,524	2.86	
Far left	Daniel Vey	1,403	2.63	
Others	N/A	3,577		
Turnout		54,700	58.66	
2nd round result
UMP	Marie-Louise Fort	27,428	53.03	
PRG	Daniel Paris	24,290	46.97	
Turnout		54,187	58.12	
UMP hold				

=== 2002 ===
Legislative Election 2002: Yonne's 3rd constituency
Party	Candidate	Votes	%	±%
UMP	Philippe Auberger	23,354	43.12	
PRG	Daniel Paris	13,189	24.35	
FN	Edouard Ferrand	9,769	18.04	
DVG	Dominique Calvary	1,670	3.08	
LCR	Daniel Vey	1,185	2.19	
Others	N/A	4,998		
Turnout		55,296	63.10	
2nd round result
UMP	Philippe Auberger	29,586	61.08	
PRG	Daniel Paris	18,853	38.92	
Turnout		50,750	57.93	
UMP hold				

=== 1997 ===
Legislative Election 1997: Yonne's 3rd constituency
Party	Candidate	Votes	%	±%
RPR	Philippe Auberger	14,468	26.24	
FN	Pierre Peres	11,245	20.40	
PCF	Jean Cordillot	9,511	17.25	
DVD	Gérard Bourgoin	7,525	13.65	
PS	Dominique Calvary	6,667	12.09	
DVD	Jacqueline Prieur	1,322	2.40	
DVE	Alberte Barillet	1,288	2.34	
DVE	Bernard Pesquet	1,179	2.14	
Others	N/A	1,922		
Turnout		57,719	70.04	
2nd round result
RPR	Philippe Auberger	33,012	68.15	
FN	Pierre Peres	15,429	31.85	
Turnout		57,292	69.53	
RPR hold				

== Sources ==
Official results of French elections from 2002: "Résultats électoraux officiels en France" (in French).
