= Pont-sur-Yonne =

- Commune
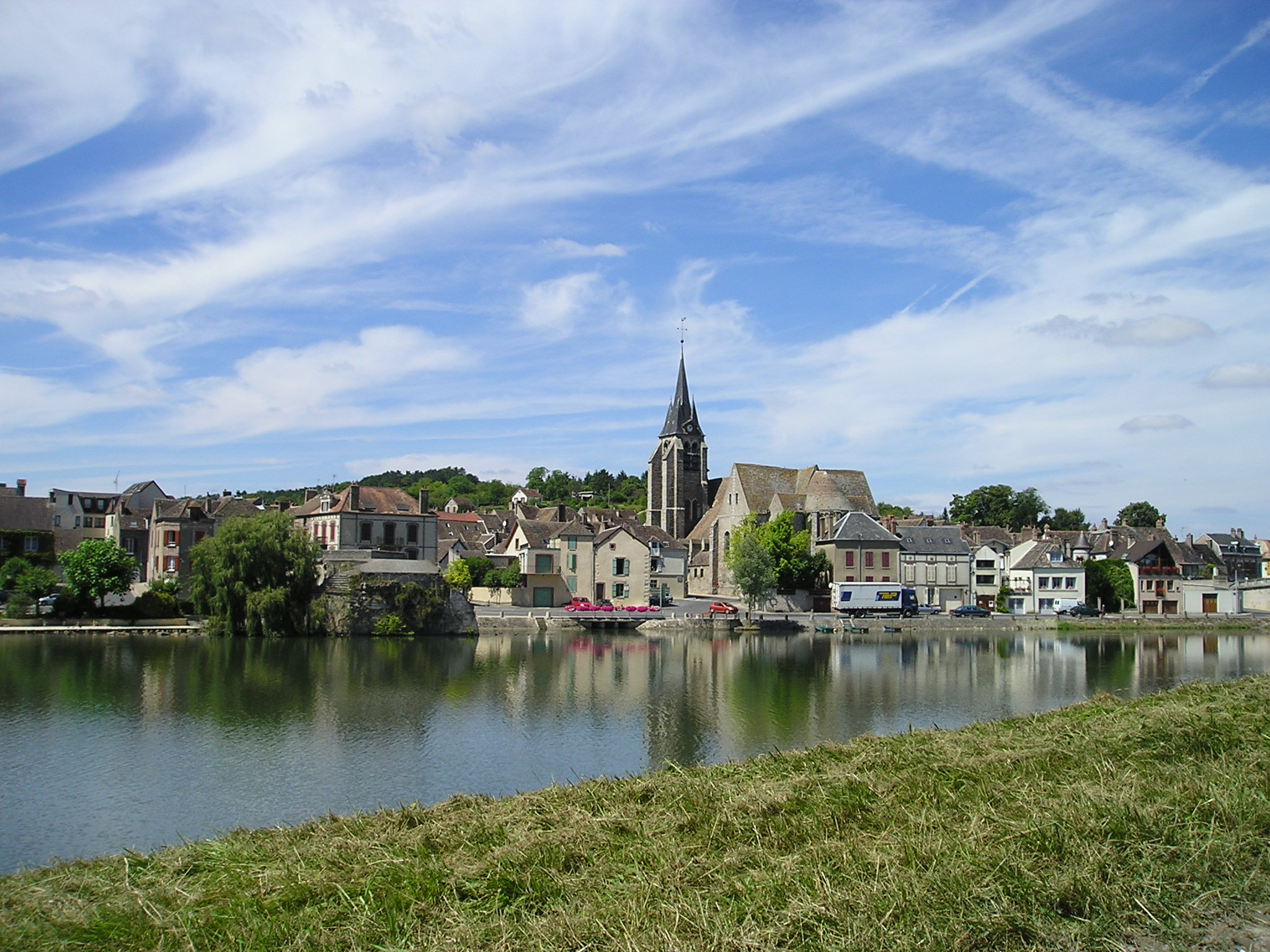
- A general view of Pont-sur-Yonne

- Coat of arms
- Location of Pont-sur-Yonne
- Location within France Location within Bourgogne-Franche-Comté
- Coordinates: 48°17′12″N 3°12′14″E
- Country: France
- Region: Bourgogne-Franche-Comté
- Department: Yonne
- Arrondissement: Sens
- Canton: Pont-sur-Yonne

Government
  - Mayor (2020–2026): Grégory Dorte
- Area^{1}: 13.90 km^{2} (5.37 sq mi)
- Highest elevation: 194 m (636 ft)
- Lowest elevation: 58 m (190 ft)
- Population (2023): 3,391
  - Density: 244.0/km^{2} (631.8/sq mi)
- Time zone: UTC+01:00 (CET)
  - Summer (DST): UTC+02:00 (CEST)
- INSEE/Postal code: 89309 /89140
- ^{1} French Land Register data, which excludes lakes, ponds, glaciers > 1 km^{2} (0.386 sq mi or 247 acres) and river estuaries.

Pont-sur-Yonne (French pronunciation: [pɔ̃ syʁ jɔn]; literally "Bridge on Yonne") is a commune in the Yonne department in Bourgogne-Franche-Comté in north-central France. It lies on the river Yonne, between Sens and Montereau-Fault-Yonne.

== Population ==
Historical population
| Year | Pop. | ±% p.a. |
|---|---|---|
| 1968 | 2,343 | — |
| 1975 | 2,705 | +2.07% |
| 1982 | 2,933 | +1.16% |
| 1990 | 3,212 | +1.14% |
| 1999 | 3,134 | −0.27% |
| 2007 | 3,125 | −0.04% |
| 2012 | 3,284 | +1.00% |
| 2017 | 3,334 | +0.30% |
| 2023 | 3,391 | +0.28% |
Source: INSEE

== See also ==
- Communes of the Yonne department
