= Chaumont, Yonne =

Commune in Bourgogne-Franche-Comté, France

Chaumont
- Commune
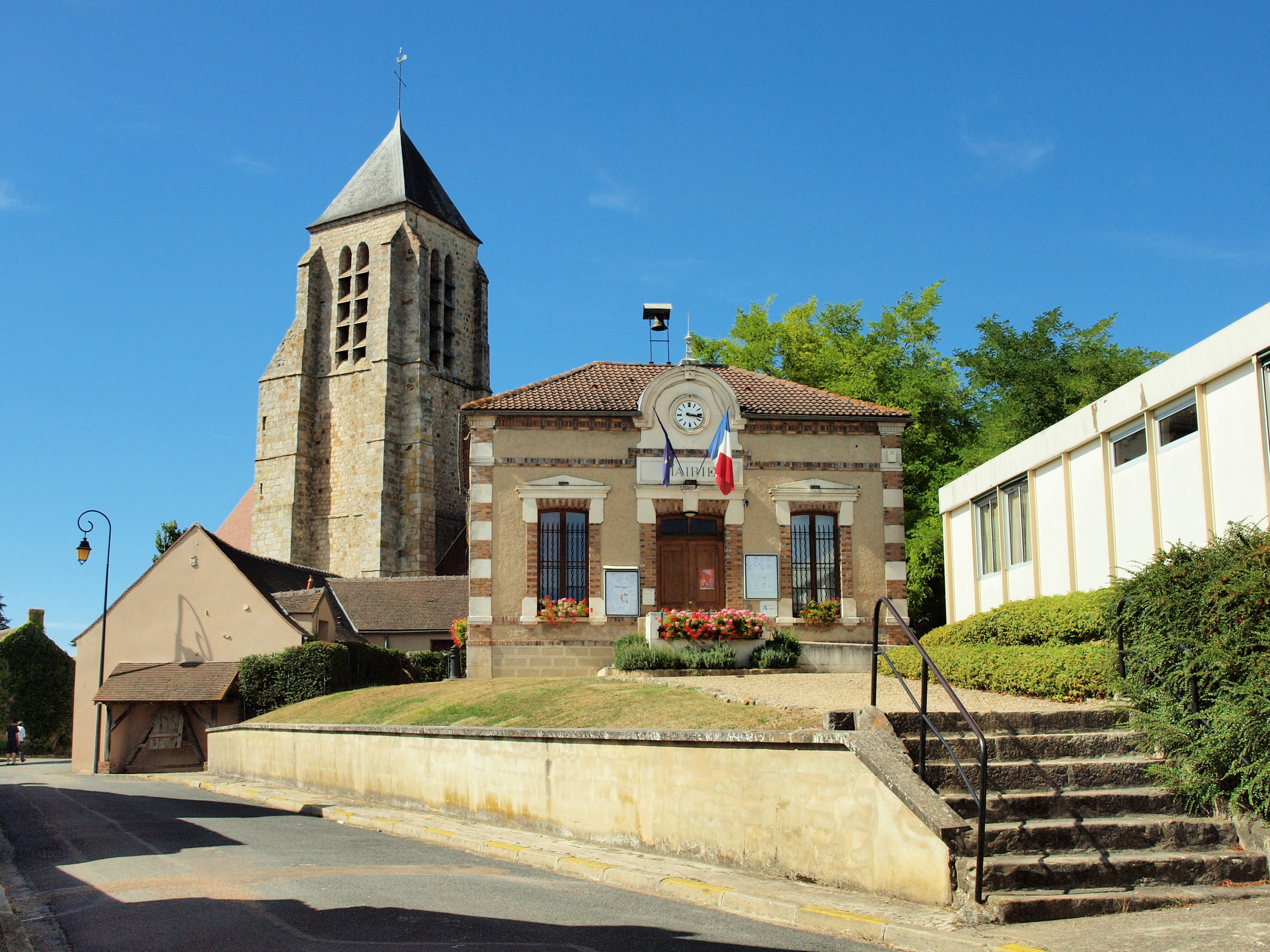
- The town hall and church in Chaumont

- Coat of arms
- Location of Chaumont
- Location within France Location within Bourgogne-Franche-Comté
- Coordinates: 48°19′29″N 3°06′16″E
- Country: France
- Region: Bourgogne-Franche-Comté
- Department: Yonne
- Arrondissement: Sens
- Canton: Pont-sur-Yonne
- Intercommunality: Communauté de communes Yonne Nord

Government
  - Mayor (2020–2026): Catherine Devinat
- Area^{1}: 8.64 km^{2} (3.34 sq mi)
- Highest elevation: 184 m (604 ft)
- Lowest elevation: 54 m (177 ft)
- Population (2023): 645
  - Density: 74.7/km^{2} (193/sq mi)
- Time zone: UTC+01:00 (CET)
  - Summer (DST): UTC+02:00 (CEST)
- INSEE/Postal code: 89093 /89340
- ^{1} French Land Register data, which excludes lakes, ponds, glaciers > 1 km^{2} (0.386 sq mi or 247 acres) and river estuaries.

Chaumont (French pronunciation: [ʃomɔ̃]) is a commune in the Yonne department in Bourgogne-Franche-Comté in north-central France.

== See also ==
- Communes of the Yonne department
