= Canton of Pont-sur-Yonne =

Coordinates: 48.29°N 3.20°E

The canton of Pont-sur-Yonne is an administrative division of the Yonne department, central France. Its borders were modified at the French canton reorganisation which came into effect in March 2015. Its seat is in Pont-sur-Yonne.

It consists of the following communes:

1. Champigny
2. Chaumont
3. Courtois-sur-Yonne
4. Pont-sur-Yonne
5. Saint-Sérotin
6. Villeblevin
7. Villemanoche
8. Villenavotte
9. Villeneuve-la-Guyard
10. Villeperrot
