= Les Écharlis Abbey =

Cistercian monastery in Yonne, France

- Abbaye des Écharlis
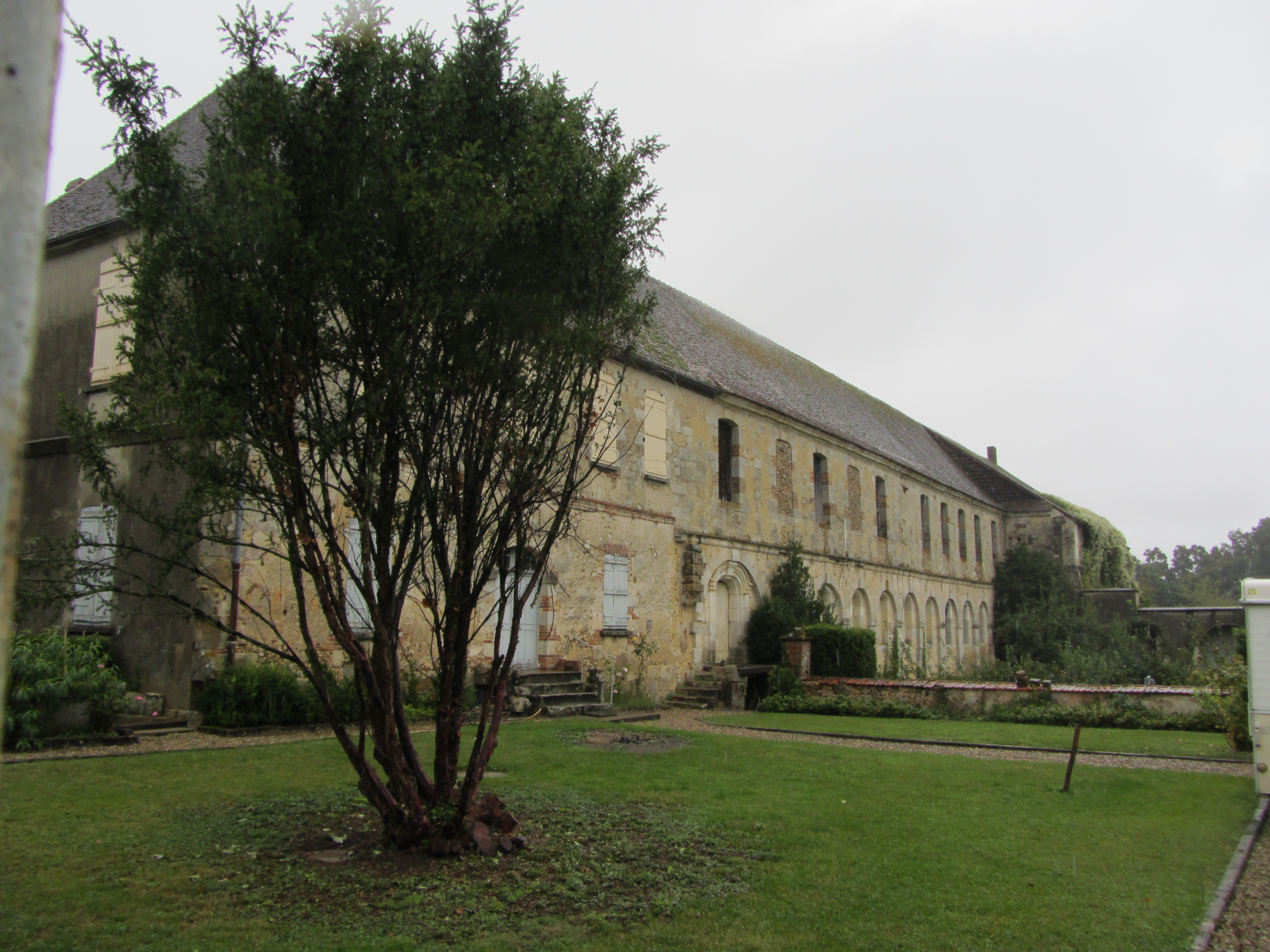
- Interactive map of Les Écharlis Abbey

Monastery information
- Other name: Scarleiæ or Eschaleium
- Order: Cistercian
- Established: 1131
- Disestablished: 1791
- Mother house: Abbey of Fontenay
- Diocese: Archdiocese of Sens

Site
- Coordinates: 47.949319°N 3.144127°W

Les Écharlis Abbey (French: Abbaye des Écharlis) is a former Cistercian monastery in Villefranche, Yonne, France. It was founded in the 12th century by a secular priest with two companions who wanted to live a monastic life. Soon afterward, the monastery joined the Cistercian order as a dependency of Fontenay Abbey.

An initial site, quickly deemed too small for the growing numbers of monks, was soon abandoned in favor of a more suitable site located a few kilometers away. The abbey grew rapidly, thanks especially to the fame of the peasant saint Saint Alpaïs whom the monks had befriended and whose vita was written around ca. 1180 by a monk named Peter. However, the abbey experienced numerous changes and hardships thereafter: the Hundred Years' War, the French Wars of Religion, abbatial appointments in commendam, and repeated destruction. It was dissolved in 1791 and sold as a so-called bien national during the French Revolution.

== Foundation ==
Les Écharlis Abbey became the first dependency of Fontenay Abbey. Its founding as a Cistercian monastery was made possible by a gift of land by a certain Vivien, a knight and lord of La Ferté-Loupière, to Father Étienne, a secular priest, and his two companions, Théobald (Thibault) and Garnier.

It is not clear when precisely the monks settled at Les Écharlis. The Gallia Christiana posits 1120 or 1125, while a charter from Guillaume, count of Joigny, which records a gift made by a Gérard de Chanle (Champlay) to the church of Les Écharlis, dates to 1108. It is therefore likely that there was a monastery on the site before its affiliation with the Cistercian Order, as was common at the time. The reference to Étienne and his two companions provides further evidence for this hypothesis: normally, Cistercian foundations required one abbot and twelve monks. Edmond Régnier suggests a dating of 1198 rather than 1108, but without questioning either the early 12th-century foundation of the monastery at Les Écharlis or a non-Cistercian origin.

An early church document – an act signed by Hugues de Toucy, archbishop of Sens, and dated 1151 – confirmed the rights of the new abbey. A bull confirms the abbey's foundation dates from 20 November 1163 and was signed by Pope Alexander III, who had sought refuge in nearby Sens to escape from Frederick Barbarossa.

What can be said with certainty is that the monastery, first settled at a site now known as Vieux-Écharlis, was eventually moved about three kilometers away to a new and, as it turns out, more permanent location.

== Second site ==
With numbers growing rapidly, the monks of Les Écharlis realized that the original site was inadequate for their needs. As that location was not in a valley, according to the usual Cistercian custom, the abbey lacked running water. Guillaume, the third abbot, decided to rebuild the abbey in its current location. This move was not well viewed by Séguin, the son of the original donor, and he demanded that the monks remain on the land given by his father. The affair went before the ecclesiastical court in 1136. The Archbishop of Sens, Henri I Sanglier, sided with the monks and approved their new location. An enraged Séguin burned down the monastery, leading the monks to appeal once again to the Archbishop of Sens, now Hugues de Toucy, who sent the bishop of Auxerre to render a verdict locally. The bishop found a compromise to satisfy both parties and Séguin subsequently made amends for his behavior.

The abbey was built with local materials, in cut stone for the load-bearing structures, and in flint rubble for the fillings. Both the abbey and the cloister were barrel-vaulted. The abbatial church was enormous, 75 meters long and 20 wide. (For comparison, the largest Cistercian church in the world, that of nearby Pontigny Abbey, is 119 meters long).

=== 14th-century peak ===
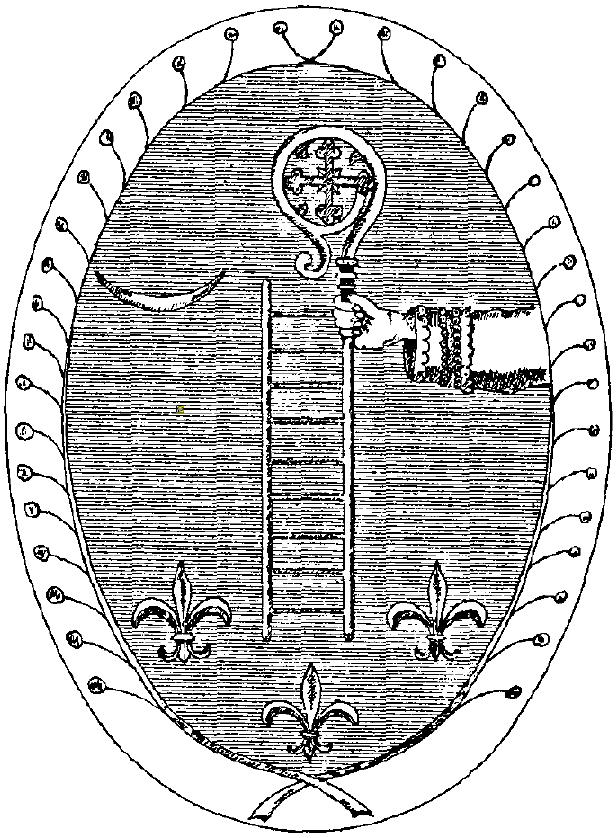
The monastery's medieval seal

Les Écharlis Abbey faced difficulties from the beginning, the surrounding land being barely cleared and still rather wild. The new monks were rather deprived of resources.

As evidenced in charters, the nascent monastery received numerous gifts and legacies. Some came from nobility and royalty, especially Louis VI (died 1137), who had been cured by the ferruginous water of the fountain in the abbey's courtyard and returned there from time to time, and Louis VII.

Other donations came from artisans and peasants. All these donations request prayers either for the donor or for their family. As the donations were very often either of farm- or woodland, the monks survived by working the land. Other gifts, manifest in the barns being raised around the monastery, were made by local squires at Bornisois (Villiers-sur-Tholon) and at Chailleuse (Senan). Note that these transfers of land, despite being called donations, were always made against a sum of silver put up by the monks, with the exception of gifts made by the archbishop or the king. By the end of the 12th century, all these donations had made the abbey very much richer.

Moreover, the abbey enriched itself spiritually, especially with the growing sanctity of Saint Alpaïs, who lived as a hermit at nearby Cudot. Miraculously cured of a skin ailment, she lived the final 30 years of her life in a total fast, eating nothing but the host every day. This miracle attracted large crowds, while the archbishop, skeptical, put Alpaïs under constant surveillance to prove the truth of her fasting. Over the years the monks of Les Écharlis wrote numerous lives of Alpaïs, of which 7 survived to the 20th century.

According to a royal charter from 1271, the monastery had 10 monks and one abbot in that year. In 1336, the papal bull Summi magistri dignatis issued by Pope Benedict XII required that Cistercian monasteries numbering more than 40 monks send at least one of them to receive theological training. The monastery of Les Écharlis was well below this number, which also explains the lack of daughter houses.

=== Burials at the abbey ===
As was the case at other Cistercian abbeys (notably Pontigny and, of course, Cîteaux) the abbey of Les Écharlis was chosen as a burial site for several local families who wanted to guarantee the monks' prayers for their souls and to create a prestigious place of burial. Among those buried at the abbey were Hugues and Alexandra de Précy in 1301, Pierre de Dicy and his successors beginning in 1319, several lords of Joigny and Prunoy, and perhaps Ferry de Seignelay in 1231.

== Difficulties and first destructions ==
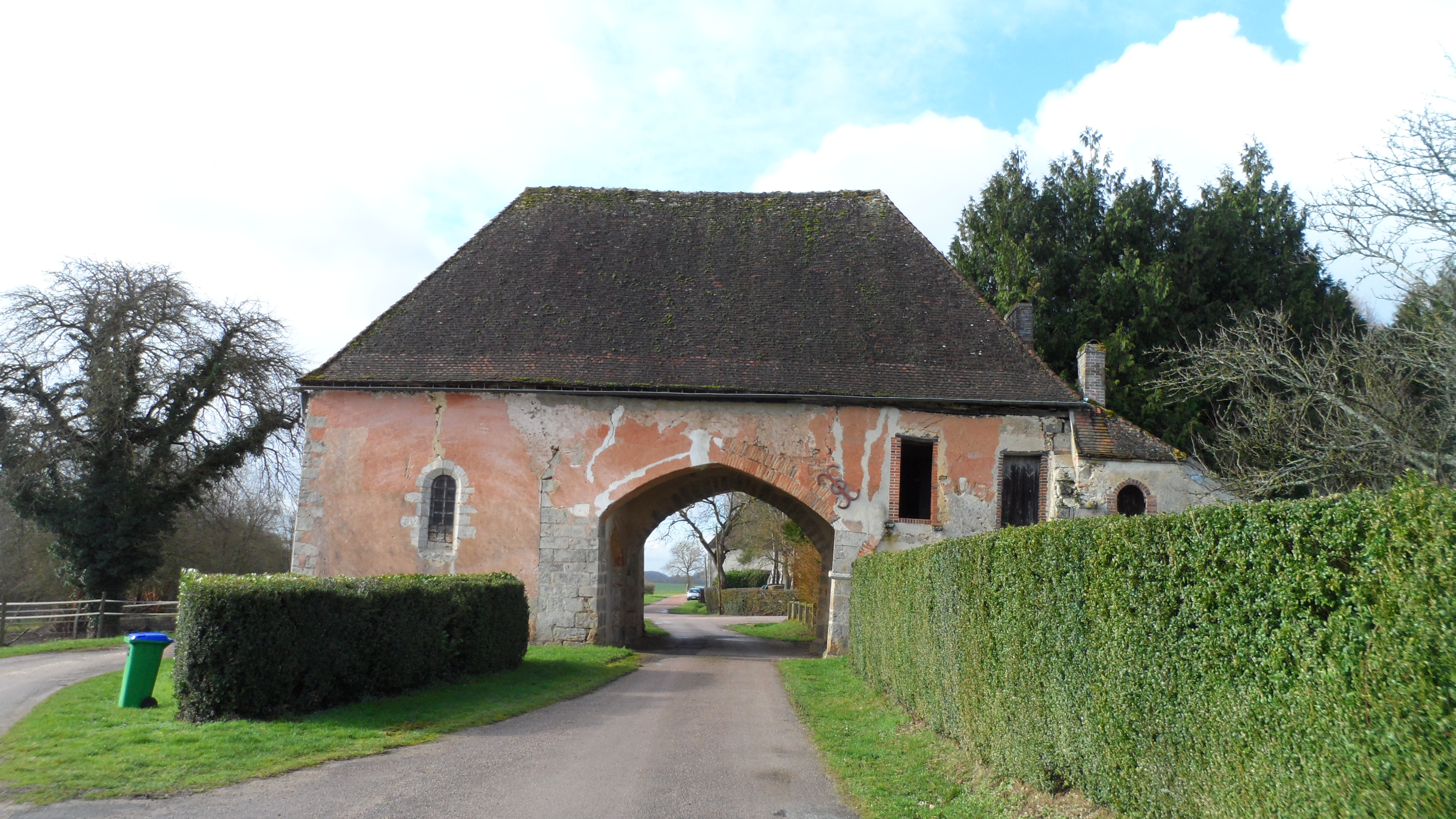
The abbey's gatehouse

From the beginning of the Hundred Years' War in 1356, the monks were menaced by the advancement of the English in the Gâtinais. They sought refuge in their "red house", near the porte de Sens in Villeneuve-le-Roi (now Villeneuve-sur-Yonne). Soldiers destroyed the abbey down to the walls and it remained unoccupied until at least 1373. Even after their very gradual return to the abbey, the monks had to pray in the small entrance chapel. As their numbers had seriously decreased due to the war, they were likewise forced to rent out some of their barns. The war dragged on and in the 15th century the monks again fled before the invading English forces. Les Écharlis Abbey languished unoccupied and open to pillage from 1440 to 1455.

The severe decrease in their numbers caused by war, the Black Death and a general decline in interest in monasticism prevented the monks from cultivating their lands themselves. They chose to lease out their lands under emphyteusis, a kind of long-term lease, thus becoming both farmers and owners.

== 16th-century decline ==
In 1524, the monks were once again harassed by armed bands sponsored by François d'Allègre, lord of Précy. As a result, the monks had to seek temporary refuge in Villeneuve-le-Roi once again. Thereafter, the monastery saw some stability and the ancient refectory was repurposed as the abbey church.

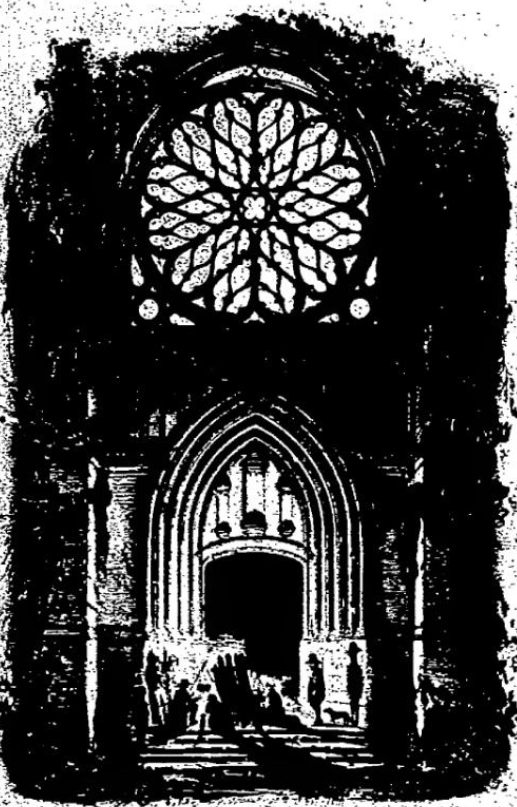
Façade of the abbey church reconstructed by Jean de Langeac - (lithograph by Victor Petit, 19th century)

It was also at this time that the appointment of abbots in commendam began in Les Écharlis: from that point on the abbot came from outside the abbey and existed outside of its rules. Initially such abbots were members of the secular clergy, often a bishop; but increasingly the commendatory abbot was chosen by the king from among the ranks of the nobility, as result of the Concordat of Bologna signed by King Francis I and Pope Leo X. The first commendatory abbot of Les Écharlis was Jean de Langeac, bishop of Avranches and later of Limoges. He undertook a number of major projects at Les Écharlis, and, according to Edmond Régnier, built a new abbey, much smaller than the first on a site measuring 32 metres by 10 metres (as opposed to 75 metres by 20 metres for the medieval abbey) and on the opposite side of the cloister. However, the good relations Jean de Langeac had with the monks were an exception. The subsequent commendatory abbot, Guillaume Pellissier, was so hated by his monks that they brought him before the courts.

In 1562 and 1568, the abbey, as well as the surrounding region, fell prey to the ravages of the French Wars of Religion. On 24 October 1562, Protestant troops led by Coligny massacred the monks and burned down the church. During the Huguenot siege of Auxerre, the monks once again sought refuge outside the monastery and therefore were not present as the abbey house, among other structures, was destroyed. With the Edict of Nantes in 1589 peace returned to the region and the monks returned to their monastery, electing a new, non-commendatory abbot, Denis de Buffevant, themselves. Unfortunately, de Buffevant spent only two years in office before abbatial appointments in commendam were restored. The monastic community was decimated: from about a dozen monks in 1544, the monastery's population dropped to just four after the wars of religion. It rose again to eight or ten monks before the Fronde, but dropped once more to four in 1669.

In this period the monastery suffered most gravely from the in commendam appointment of abbots. Not only did the work of the abbey serve only to enrich a distant lord, but a single family arrogated to themselves the exclusive right to pass on the commendam. In 1615 the house of Courtenay secured their control of the abbey of Les Écharlis, keeping it until 1731. Their commendatory abbots enjoyed the abbey's revenues without carrying out the regular repairs required to maintain the monastery.

The monastery suffered further damage during the Fronde. in 1652, a squadron of 600-700 soldiers from the forces of Louis, Prince of Condé, pillaged and burned the monastery; eight villagers who had sought refuge at the abbey died in the fire despite the monks' best efforts to save them. The damages were estimated at 100,000 livres tournois. At the end of the 17th century, the monastery had fewer than four or five monks living in the only building to have survived these various ravages. Edmond Martène and Ursin Durand found just three monks living there in the early 18th century.

== Reconstruction ==
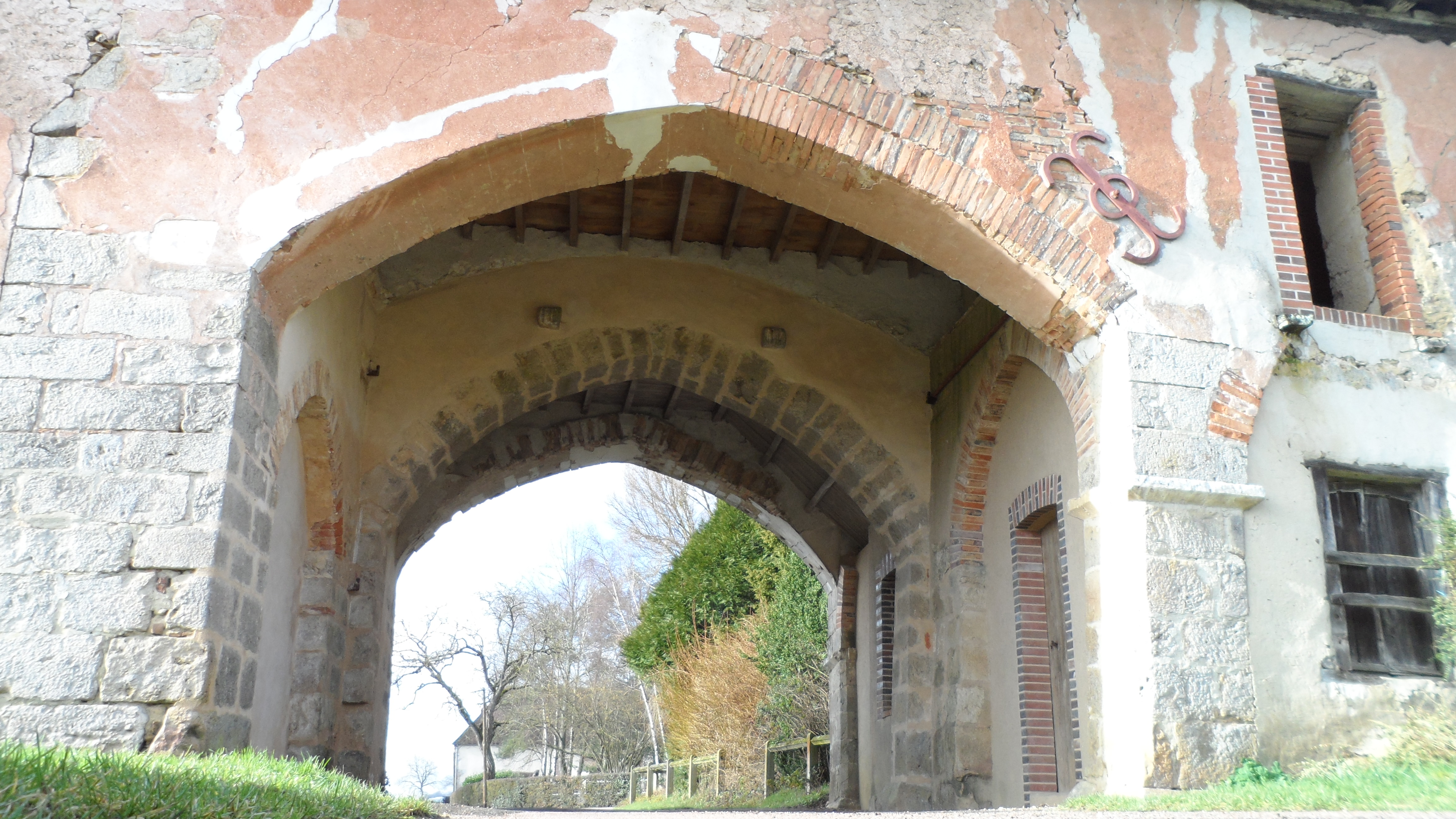
The gatehouse

In the 18th century, once the Courtenay family had secured their control over the abbey, the new commendatory abbot, Gaspard de Coriolis d'Espinouse, wanted to restore the monastery, which he financed by cutting a massive quantity of timber on the abbey's lands between 1767 and 1774. The church of Jean de Langeac received a new roof (though, pace Alexandre Salomon, it was not reconstructed in its entirety) and the monastic buildings, dormitory, chapter house, and refectory were completely restored. At this time there were very few monks at Écharlis, just three or four permanently throughout the 18th century. In 1791, of the four monks then in residence, just one, Marie-Joseph Mésange (from Montargis), was from the surrounding region. The prior, Dom Jean-Antoine Choppin, and a monk named François Guériotand were from Lorraine; the remaining monk, Claude Viennot, was from Franche-Comté.

== The French Revolution and dissolution ==
Despite everything, the monks enjoyed a good reputation and when, on 18 November 1790, two administrators from the district of Joigny came to affix the seals on the abbey, they held back. Nonetheless, on 23 January 1791 the monks were forced to leave by the revolutionaries, and the monastery was sold as a bien national in 1792. The buyer, an artisan, dismantled it bit by bit. Nothing remains of the medieval monastery but the entrance to the property, which dates from the 12th century and includes a small chapel dedicated to Notre-Dame-de-Pitié. The chapel dates to the 13th century and was a place of local pilgrimage. By contrast, by 1868 all that remained of the 18th-century monastery was the monks' quarters.
