= Notre-Dame de l'Assomption =

Notre-Dame de l'Assomption is the name of several churches:

== Canada ==
- Notre-Dame de l'Assomption Abbey, New Brunswick
- Our Lady of the Assumption Cathedral (Moncton), New Brunswick

== France ==
- Church of Notre-Dame, Cudot (Église Notre-Dame-de-l'Assomption), Cudot, Yonne
- Church of Notre-Dame, Villeneuve-sur-Yonne (Église Notre-Dame-de-l'Assomption), Villeneuve-sur-Yonne, Yonne
- Church of Our Lady of the Assumption, Stains (Église Notre-Dame-de-l'Assomption), Stains, Seine-Saint-Denis
- Clermont-Ferrand Cathedral (Cathédrale Notre-Dame-de-l'Assomption de Clermont-Ferrand), Clermont-Ferrand, Puy-de-Dôme
- Église Notre-Dame de l'Assomption, Bergheim, Bergheim, Haut-Rhin
- Église Notre-Dame de l'Assomption, Metz, Metz, Moselle
- Église Notre-Dame de l'Assomption, Rouffach, Rouffach, Haut-Rhin
- Entrevaux Cathedral (Cathédrale Notre-Dame-de-l'Assomption d'Entrevaux), Glandèves, Alpes-Maritimes
- Lescar Cathedral (Cathédrale Notre-Dame-de-l'Assomption de Lescar), Lescar, Pyrénées-Atlantiques
- Montauban Cathedral (Cathédrale Notre-Dame-de-l'Assomption de Montauban), Montauban, Tarn-et-Garonne
- Notre-Dame-de-l'Assomption, Luché-Pringé, Luché-Pringé, Sarthe
- Notre-Dame-de-l'Assomption, Paris, 1st arrondissement of Paris
- Riez Cathedral (Cathédrale Notre-Dame-de-l'Assomption de Riez), Riez, Alpes-de-Haute-Provence

=== Overseas departments and territorial collectivities ===
- Ajaccio Cathedral (Cathédrale Notre-Dame de l'Assomption de Ajaccio), Ajaccio, Corscia
- Cathedral of Our Lady of the Assumption, Mata-Utu (Cathédrale Notre-Dame-de-l'Assomption de Matâ'Utu), Uvea, Wallis and Futuna
- Co-Cathedral of Our Lady of Assumption, Saint-Pierre (Cathédrale Notre-Dame-de-l'Assomption de Saint-Pierre de la Martinique), Saint-Pierre, Martinique
- Notre Dame de l'Assomption, les Saintes, Terre-de-Haut Island, Guadeloupe
- Our Lady of the Assumption Church, Sainte-Marie (Église Notre-Dame-de-l'Assomption de Sainte-Marie), Sainte-Marie, Martinique

== Haiti ==
- Cathedral of Our Lady of the Assumption, Port-au-Prince, Port-au-Prince
