= Un secret =

Un secret may refer to:

- Un secret, a poem by Félix Arvers
- A Secret, a 2007 French film
