= Ribière =

Ribière is a French surname. Notable people with the surname include:

- Germaine Ribière (1917–1999), French Catholic, member of the Résistance
- Hippolyte Ribière (1822–1885), French lawyer and politician
- René Ribière (1922–1998), French politician
