= List of senators of Yonne =

Location of Yonne in France

Following is a list of senators of Yonne, people who have represented the department of Yonne in the Senate of France.

== Third Republic ==
Senators for Yonne under the French Third Republic were:

- Hippolyte Ribière (1876–1885)
- Édouard Charton (1876–1890)
- Jules Guichard (1885–1896)
- Gustave Coste (1890–1900)
- Alexandre Dethou (1892–1896)
- Paul Bezine (1896–1909)
- Charles Laubry (1897–1899)
- Théophile Collinot (1900–1905)
- Félix Lordereau (1900–1909)
- Jean-Baptiste Bienvenu-Martin (1905–1940)
- Félix Besnard (1909–1913)
- Lucien Cornet (1909–1922)
- Marcel Ribière (1913–1922)
- Gaston Gaudaire (1922–1936)
- Henri Hamelin (1922–1940)
- Georges Boully (1936–1940)

== Fourth Republic ==
Senators for Yonne under the French Fourth Republic were:

In office	Name	Group	Notes
1946–1947	Georges Schiever	Républicains indépendants	Died 25 September 1947
1946–1948	Paul Fourré	Communiste	
1948–1959	André Plait	Centre National des Indépendants et Paysans	
1948–1959	Philippe de Raincourt	Républicains indépendants	

== Fifth Republic ==
Senators for Yonne under the French Fifth Republic:

In office	Name	Party or Group	Notes
1959	Philippe de Raincourt	Independent Republicans Group (RI)	
1959–1986	Paul Guillaumot	Independent Republicans Group (RI)	
1959–1968	André Plait	Independent Republicans Group (RI)	
1968–1973	Jacques Piot	Independent Republicans Group (RI)	
1973–1977	Odette Pagani	Independent Republicans Group (RI)	
1977–1995	Jean Chamant	Rally for the Republic (RPR)	
1986–2009	Henri de Raincourt	Union for a Popular Movement (UMP)	
1995–2004	Serge Franchis	Union for a Popular Movement (UMP)	
2004–2014	Pierre Bordier	Union for a Popular Movement (UMP)	
2009–2012	André Villiers	Union of Democrats and Independents (UDI)	
from 2012	Henri de Raincourt	The Republicans (LR)	
from 2014	Jean-Baptiste Lemoyne	Union for a Popular Movement (UMP) then The Republicans (LR) then La République En Marche! (LREM)	Named to the cabinet in June 2017
from 2017	Noëlle Rauscent	La République En Marche! (LREM)	Replaced Jean-Baptiste Lemoyne

== Sources ==
- Liste des anciens sénateurs de la IIIème République par circonscription (in French), Sénat de France
- Liste des anciens sénateurs de la IVème République par circonscription (in French), Sénat de France
- Liste des anciens sénateurs de la Vème République par circonscription (in French), Sénat de France
- Liste par département - Yonne (in French), Sénat de France
