= Hippolyte Ribière =

French politician (1822–1885)

Charles-Hippolyte Ribière
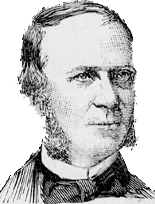

Senator of Yonne
- In office 30 January 1876 – 29 June 1885
- Succeeded by: Jules Guichard

Personal details
- Born: 1 March 1822 Champlay, Yonne, France
- Died: 29 June 1885 (aged 63) Auxerre, Yonne, France
- Occupation: Lawyer, politician

Charles-Hippolyte Ribière (1 March 1822 – 29 June 1885) was a French lawyer and politician who was Senator of Yonne from 1876 to 1885.

== Early years ==
Charles-Hippolyte Ribière was born in Champlay, Yonne, on 1 March 1822. He came from a prosperous and respected family. His parents were Pierre-Hippolyte Ribière (1789–1855), notary royal and Mayor of Champlay, and Rosalie Savatier-Laroche (1802–79). On his father's side the family had been established in Sépeaux, Yonne, in the 17th century. His mother's family had been established socially and politically before the French Revolution of 1789. He studied classics at the Auxerre College, then studied at the Faculty of Law in Paris, earning a license in law in 1844 and a doctorate in law in 1846.

== Lawyer ==
From 1847 to 1870 Ribière practiced as an advocate in Auxerre, described as being erudite, serious and methodical. On 26 August 1851 he married Augustine Croiset (1833–1893). They had three children. The youngest, Marcel Ribière (1860–1922), also became an advocate and was later a member of the Council of State, Mayor of Auxerre, deputy and senator. During the Second French Empire Hippolyte Ribière was known as a republican. In 1864 he was a republican candidate in the departmental elections, but was not elected.

== Political career ==
After the fall of the empire, on 4 September 1870 Ribière was appointed Prefect of Yonne. He held this office during the Franco-Prussian War and until May 1873, when Adolphe Thiers was forced out of office. Ribière was elected Senator of Yonne on 30 January 1876 and joined the republican left. He voted against the dissolution of the chamber of deputies demanded by the government of Albert, 4th duc de Broglie. He supported the ministry of Jules Armand Dufaure. In June 1881 he was rapporteur on the law for compulsory secular primary education. He became general councilor for the canton of Toucy. Ribière ran for reelection in 1882. The election manifesto of Ribière and his colleague Charton said,

Ever since 1848 ... in administrative and political office, in elected bodies, in popular education societies, in written or spoken expressions of our opinion, everywhere and at all times, we dare to affirm that our public life has been witness to our constant efforts on behalf of the triumph of the Republic and democracy. ... The future lies, quite simply, in rational solutions to problems rationally formulated at the present time. What are the issues? The revision of the Constitution; separation of Church and State; reform of the judiciary; military service; the right of assembly and association; the law on public education. We will vote for the revision; we will vote from today, on the following measures, required from today: abolition of the irremovability of senators; extension of the right to vote; precise demarcation of the prerogatives of the two Chambers in respect of voting on financial and tax matters.

Ribière was reelected to the senate on 8 January 1882, and continued to sit on the left. He died in office in Auxerre, Yonne, on 29 June 1885. He was succeeded on 23 August 1885 by Jules Guichard.

== Publications ==
Ribière was the author of various Senate reports. He also published:

- H. Ribière (1858), Essai sur l'histoire de l'imprimerie dans le Département de l'Yonne : et spécialement à Auxerre; suivi du Catalogue des livres, brochures et pièces imprimés dans cette ville de 1580 à 1857, Auxerre: Société des sciences historiques et naturelles de l'Yonne, p. 378

== Sources ==
- Abélès, Marc (1991-07-26), Quiet Days in Burgundy: A Study of Local Politics, Cambridge University Press, ISBN 978-0-521-38302-8
- Bert, Adrien, "Hippolyte RIBIÈRE", geneanet (in French)
- Hippolyte Ribière (1822-1885) - Auteur du texte (in French), BnF: Bibliotheque nationale de France
- Robert, Adolphe; Cougny, Gaston (1889–1891), "RIBIÈRE (CHARLES-HIPPOLYTE)", in Edgar Bourloton (ed.), Dictionnaire des parlementaires français (in French)
- Wright, Vincent; Anceau, Éric (2007), Les préfets de Gambetta (in French), Presses Paris Sorbonne, ISBN 978-2-84050-504-4
