= Villecien =

- Commune
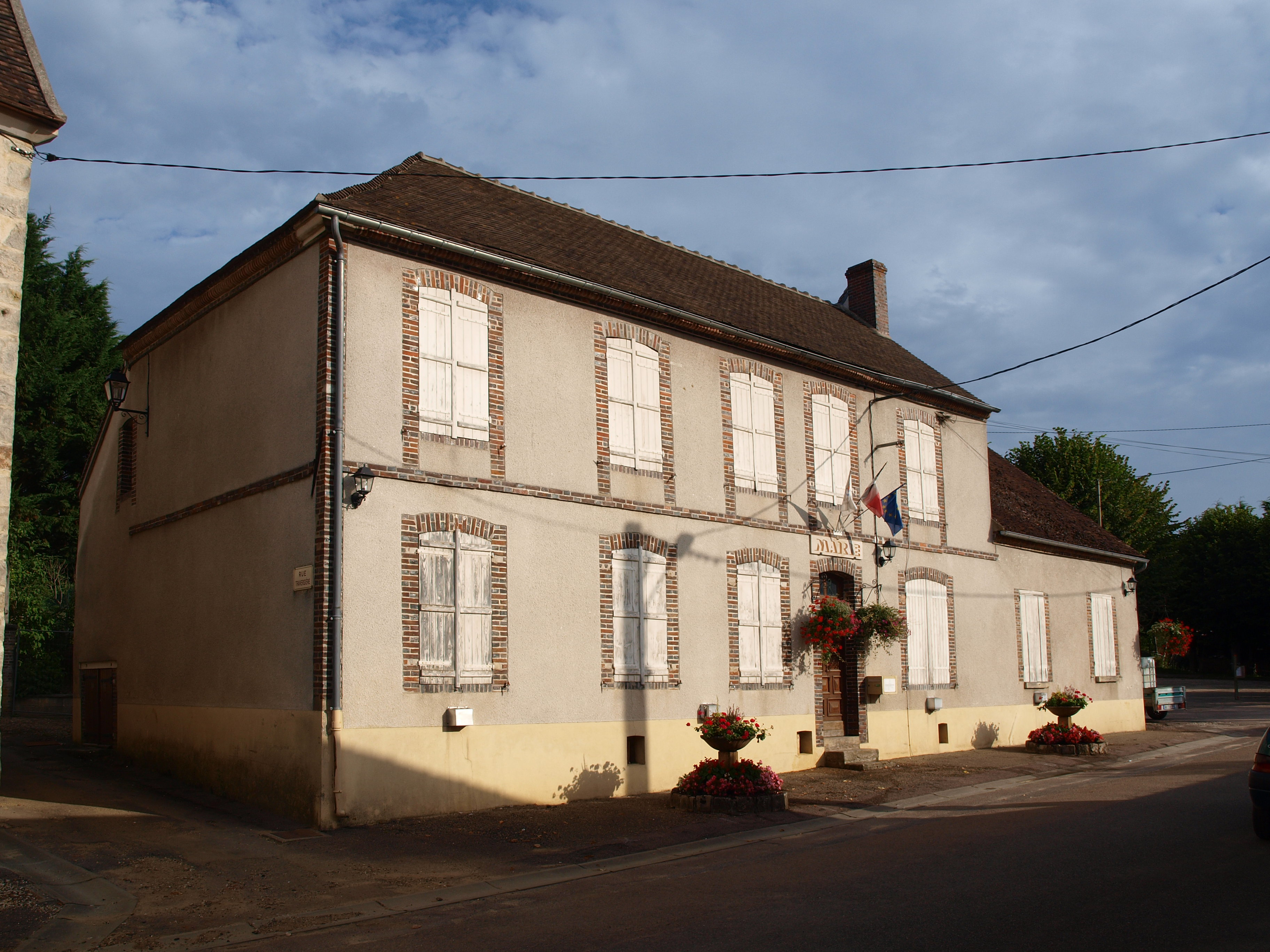
- The town hall in Villecien
- Location of Villecien
- Location within France Location within Bourgogne-Franche-Comté
- Coordinates: 48°00′28″N 3°19′49″E
- Country: France
- Region: Bourgogne-Franche-Comté
- Department: Yonne
- Arrondissement: Sens
- Canton: Joigny

Government
  - Mayor (2020–2026): Bruno Jan
- Area^{1}: 7.60 km^{2} (2.93 sq mi)
- Highest elevation: 214 m (702 ft)
- Lowest elevation: 72 m (236 ft)
- Population (2023): 335
  - Density: 44.1/km^{2} (114/sq mi)
- Time zone: UTC+01:00 (CET)
  - Summer (DST): UTC+02:00 (CEST)
- INSEE/Postal code: 89452 /89300
- ^{1} French Land Register data, which excludes lakes, ponds, glaciers > 1 km^{2} (0.386 sq mi or 247 acres) and river estuaries.

Villecien (French pronunciation: [vilsjɛ̃]) is a commune in the Yonne department in Bourgogne-Franche-Comté in north-central France.

== See also ==
- Communes of the Yonne department
