= Félix Arvers =

French writer (1806–1850)

Alexis-Félix Arvers (July 23, 1806 – November 7, 1850) was a French poet and dramatist, most famous for his poem: Un secret.

Arvers was from Cézy, the son of a wine merchant. Arvers abandoned his law career at the age 30 to concentrate on theatre. His plays gained moderate success in their own time, but none were as notorious as Un Secret, which was dedicated to Marie Mennessier-Nodier, the daughter of writer Charles Nodier. This poem was taken from a piece he wrote in 1840, titled Mes heures perdues (My lost hours).

Arvers found no way to express his unrequited love and alleviate his pain, he had no way, but to confide his feelings in a sonnet. The poem was so heart-wrenching and struck such a success and popularity. It had a powerful romantic description of profound feelings among the frequenters of the Paris literary salons, and it would be circulated and recited among them for years before becoming a classic of French romantic poetry after his death.

Un secret was the only well-known poem in his oeuvre titled Mes heures perdues. Félix Arvers was referred to in French literature as "The Poet of a single poem." The sonnet is also known around the world as the Sonnet d'Arvers.
