= Marie Mennessier-Nodier =

French musician, poet, and writer (1811–1893)

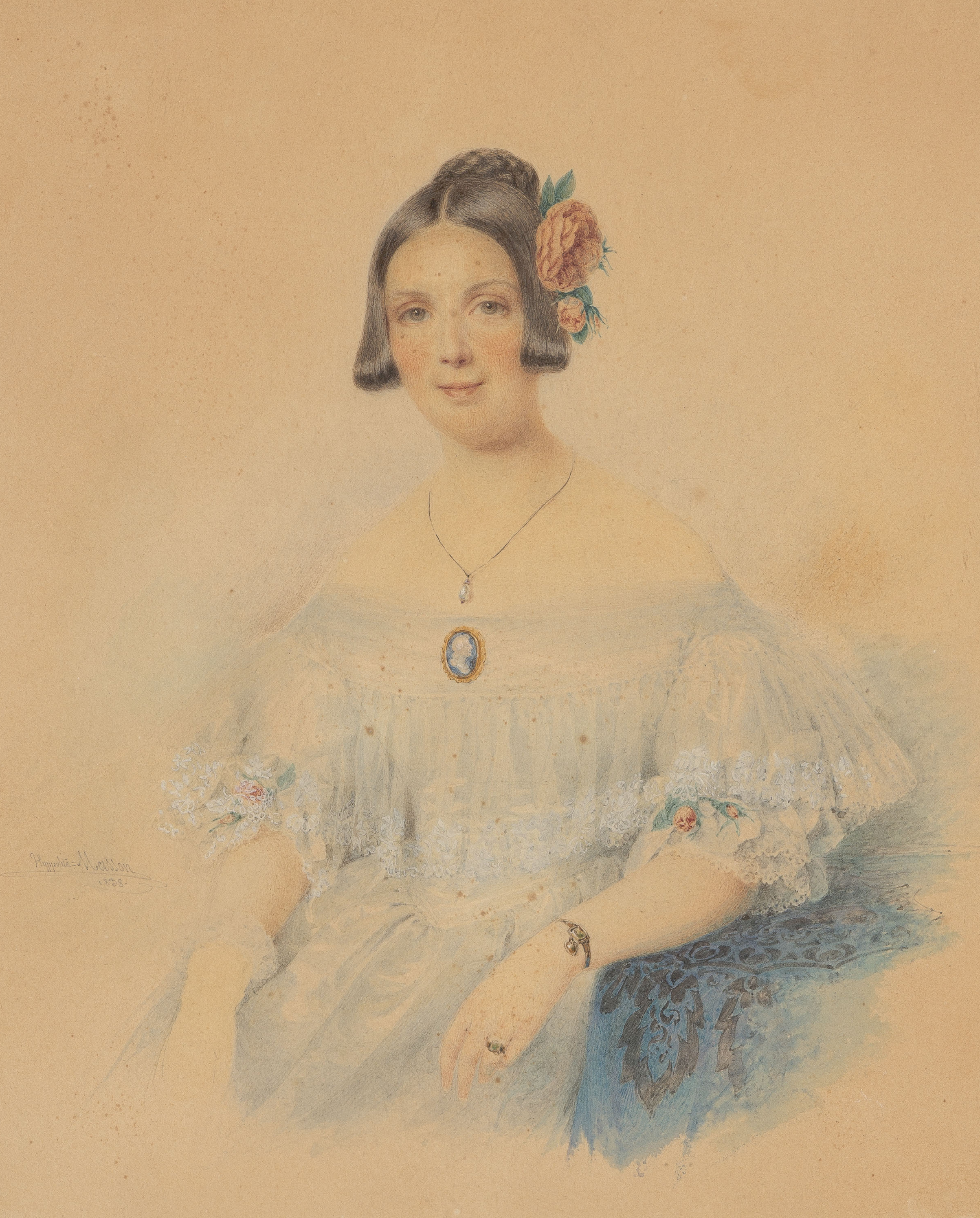
Portrait by Hyppolite Masson, 1838

Marie-Antoinette-Élisabeth Mennessier-Nodier (26 April 1811 – 1 November 1893) was a French musician, poet, and writer, the daughter of Charles Nodier. She was largely overshadowed by her father and was well known in his literary circles at the Arsenal.

== Life and work ==
Marie Nodier was born in Quintigny, the daughter of Charles Nodier (1780–1844) and Désirée Charve. Growing up in the company of her father's associates (who included such figures as Victor Hugo) she took to art, music, and literature at a young age. She played the piano and composed a set of fifteen chansons Mélodies Romantiques (1831). Alfred de Musset (1810–1857) dedicated a poem in 1843 to her and Félix Arvers (1806–1850) wrote a sonnet "Sonnet d'Arvers" to her in her notebook. She married Jules Mennessier at the age of 19, the couple lived in Arsenal and later Metz. Her father sold many of his books to pay her dowry. In 1836 she published "La Perce-neige" and after the death of her father, she wrote a memoir on his life. She contributed a letter from a swallow to a canary raised in a convent as part of the illustrated parody Scènes de la vie privée et publique des animaux (1842). As a monarchist, she had a fear of revolutions and was worried for her children during various periods of public unrest. She lived a private life and stayed away from the literary scene from 1844 when she also took on the name Mennessier-Nodier. After the death of her father in 1844 and her mother in 1856, she wrote a book on her father which was published in 1867. Jules retired in 1869 and they had four children. She died at Fontenay-aux-Roses.
