= Saint-Aubin-sur-Yonne =

- Commune
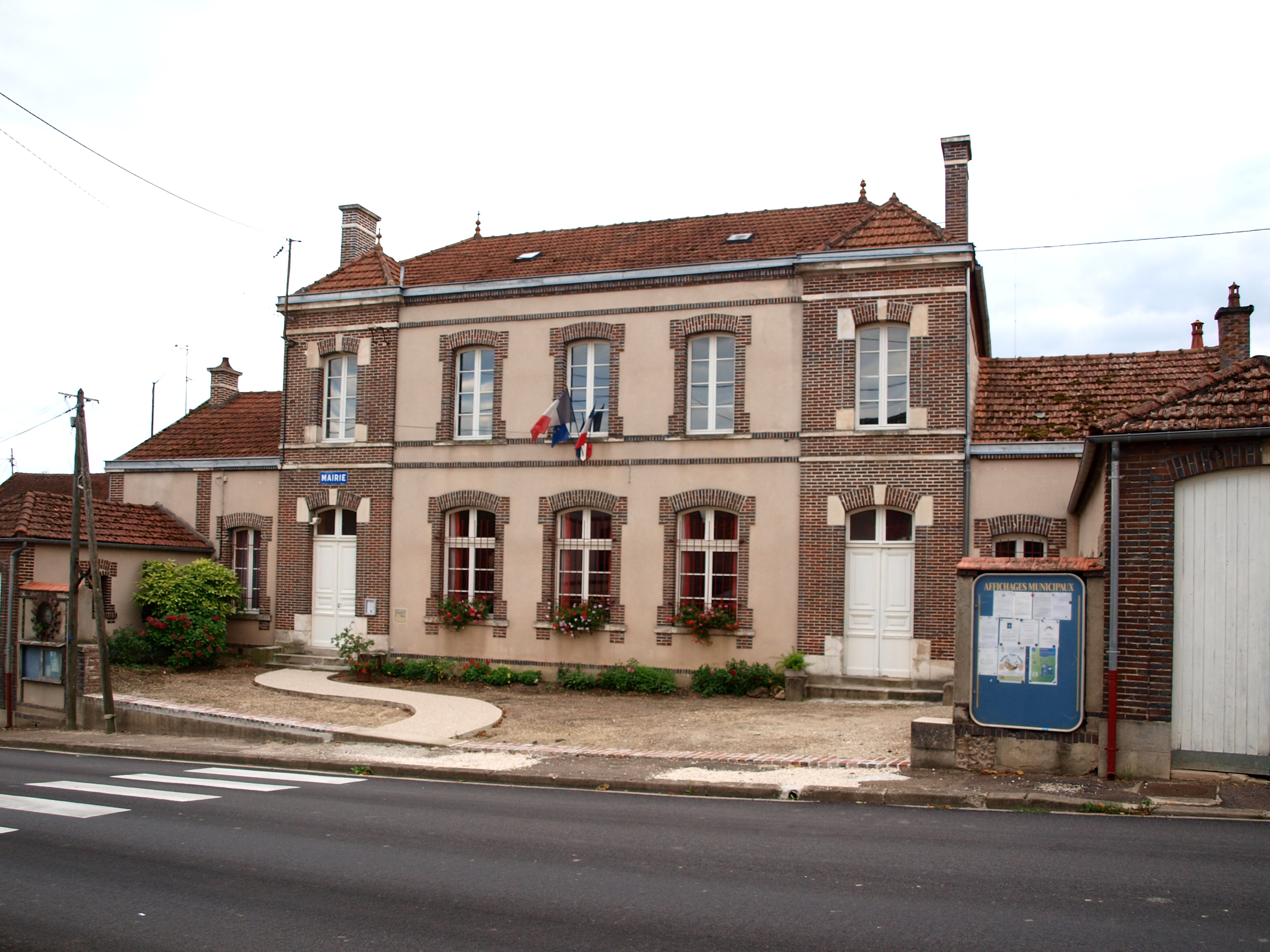
- The town hall in Saint-Aubin-sur-Yonne
- Location of Saint-Aubin-sur-Yonne
- Location within France Location within Bourgogne-Franche-Comté
- Coordinates: 48°00′07″N 3°20′48″E
- Country: France
- Region: Bourgogne-Franche-Comté
- Department: Yonne
- Arrondissement: Sens
- Canton: Joigny

Government
  - Mayor (2020–2026): Jean-Pierre Baussart
- Area^{1}: 8.87 km^{2} (3.42 sq mi)
- Highest elevation: 220 m (720 ft)
- Lowest elevation: 72 m (236 ft)
- Population (2023): 434
  - Density: 48.9/km^{2} (127/sq mi)
- Time zone: UTC+01:00 (CET)
  - Summer (DST): UTC+02:00 (CEST)
- INSEE/Postal code: 89335 /89300
- ^{1} French Land Register data, which excludes lakes, ponds, glaciers > 1 km^{2} (0.386 sq mi or 247 acres) and river estuaries.

Saint-Aubin-sur-Yonne (French pronunciation: [sɛ̃.t‿obɛ̃ syʁ jɔn], literally Saint-Aubin on Yonne) is a commune in the Yonne department in Bourgogne-Franche-Comté in north-central France. It is part of the canton of Joigny and the arrondissement of Sens. The inhabitants of Saint-Aubin-sur-Yonne called the Aubinois. The area is 8.9 square kilometers and the population is 434 (2023). It is located at an altitude of 92 meters.

== See also ==
- Communes of the Yonne department
