= Verlin =

- Commune
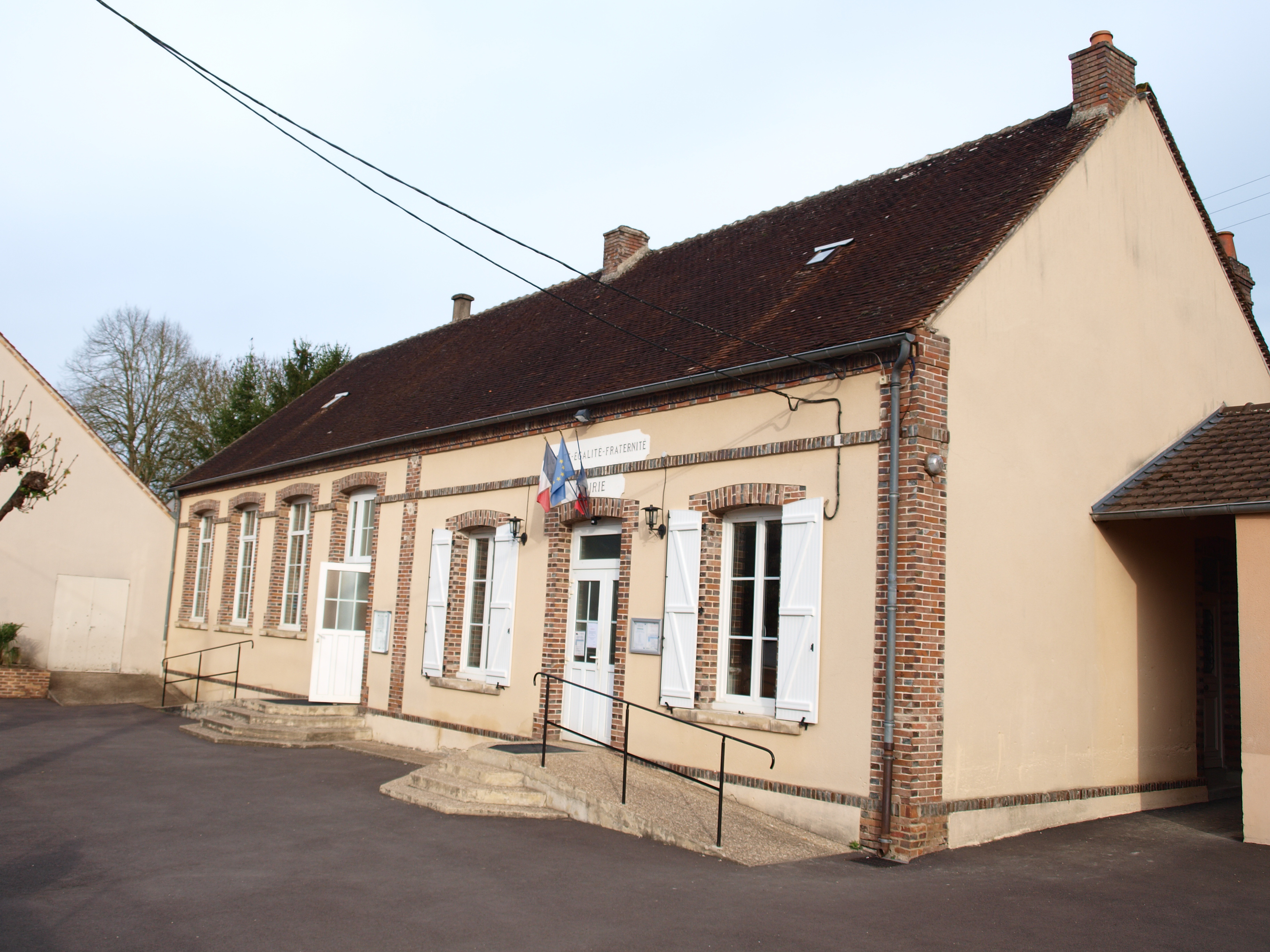
- The town hall in Verlin
- Location of Verlin
- Location within France Location within Bourgogne-Franche-Comté
- Coordinates: 48°01′03″N 3°14′01″E
- Country: France
- Region: Bourgogne-Franche-Comté
- Department: Yonne
- Arrondissement: Sens
- Canton: Joigny

Government
  - Mayor (2020–2026): Gilles Maxime-Poiblanc
- Area^{1}: 14.10 km^{2} (5.44 sq mi)
- Highest elevation: 187 m (614 ft)
- Lowest elevation: 100 m (330 ft)
- Population (2023): 406
  - Density: 28.8/km^{2} (74.6/sq mi)
- Time zone: UTC+01:00 (CET)
  - Summer (DST): UTC+02:00 (CEST)
- INSEE/Postal code: 89440 /89330
- ^{1} French Land Register data, which excludes lakes, ponds, glaciers > 1 km^{2} (0.386 sq mi or 247 acres) and river estuaries.

Verlin (French pronunciation: [vɛʁlɛ̃]) is a commune in the Yonne department in Bourgogne-Franche-Comté in north-central France.

== See also ==
- Communes of the Yonne department
