= Saint-Loup-d'Ordon =

- Commune
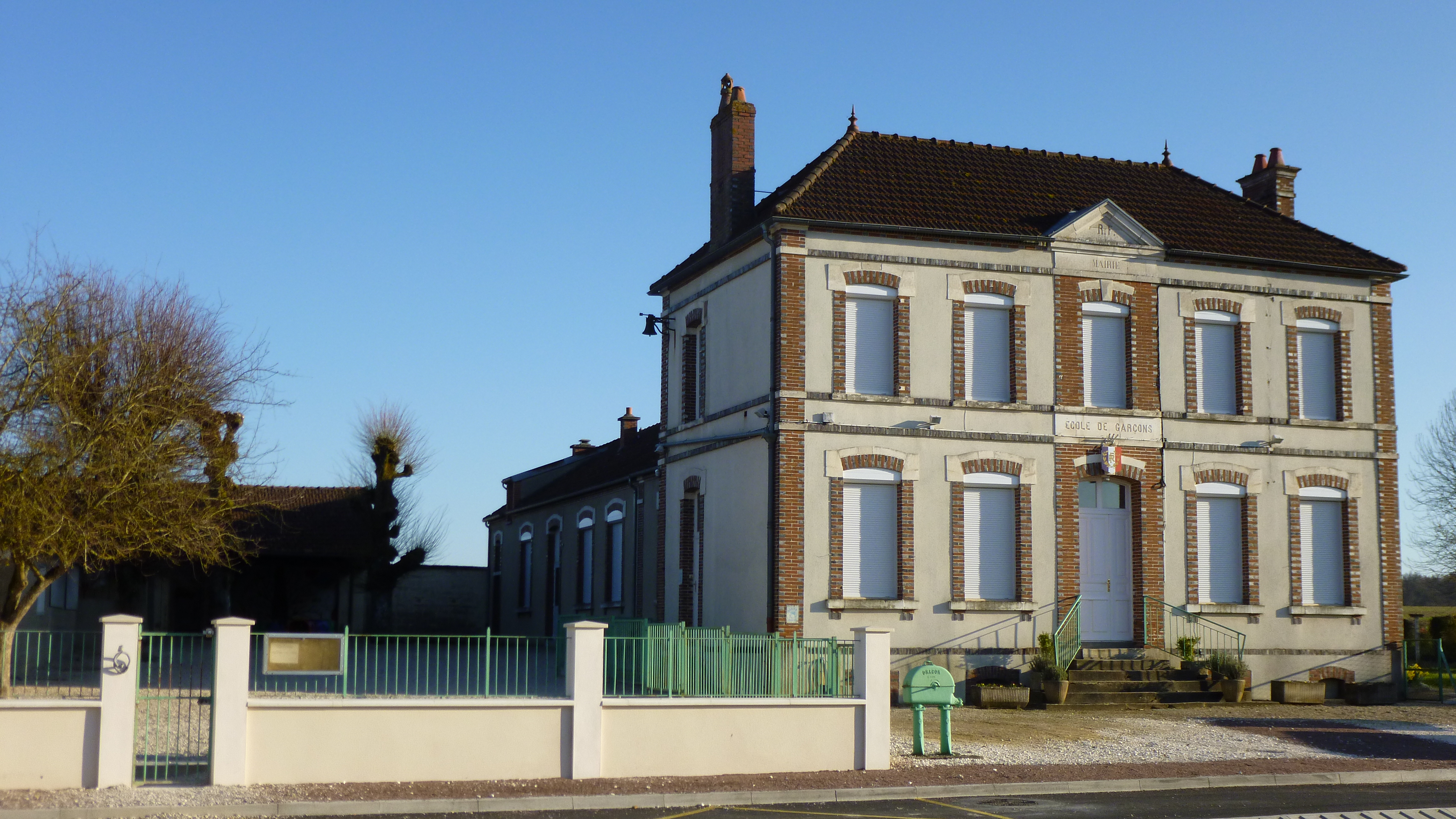
- The town hall in Saint-Loup-d'Ordon
- Location of Saint-Loup-d'Ordon
- Location within France Location within Bourgogne-Franche-Comté
- Coordinates: 48°01′00″N 3°09′50″E
- Country: France
- Region: Bourgogne-Franche-Comté
- Department: Yonne
- Arrondissement: Sens
- Canton: Joigny

Government
  - Mayor (2020–2026): Frédéric Grahling
- Area^{1}: 17.67 km^{2} (6.82 sq mi)
- Highest elevation: 194 m (636 ft)
- Lowest elevation: 151 m (495 ft)
- Population (2023): 242
  - Density: 13.7/km^{2} (35.5/sq mi)
- Time zone: UTC+01:00 (CET)
  - Summer (DST): UTC+02:00 (CEST)
- INSEE/Postal code: 89350 /89330
- ^{1} French Land Register data, which excludes lakes, ponds, glaciers > 1 km^{2} (0.386 sq mi or 247 acres) and river estuaries.

Saint-Loup-d'Ordon (French pronunciation: [sɛ̃ lu dɔʁdɔ̃]) is a commune in the Yonne department in Bourgogne-Franche-Comté in north-central France.

== See also ==
- Communes of the Yonne department
