= Alpaïs of Cudot =

Blessed Alpaïs of Cudot
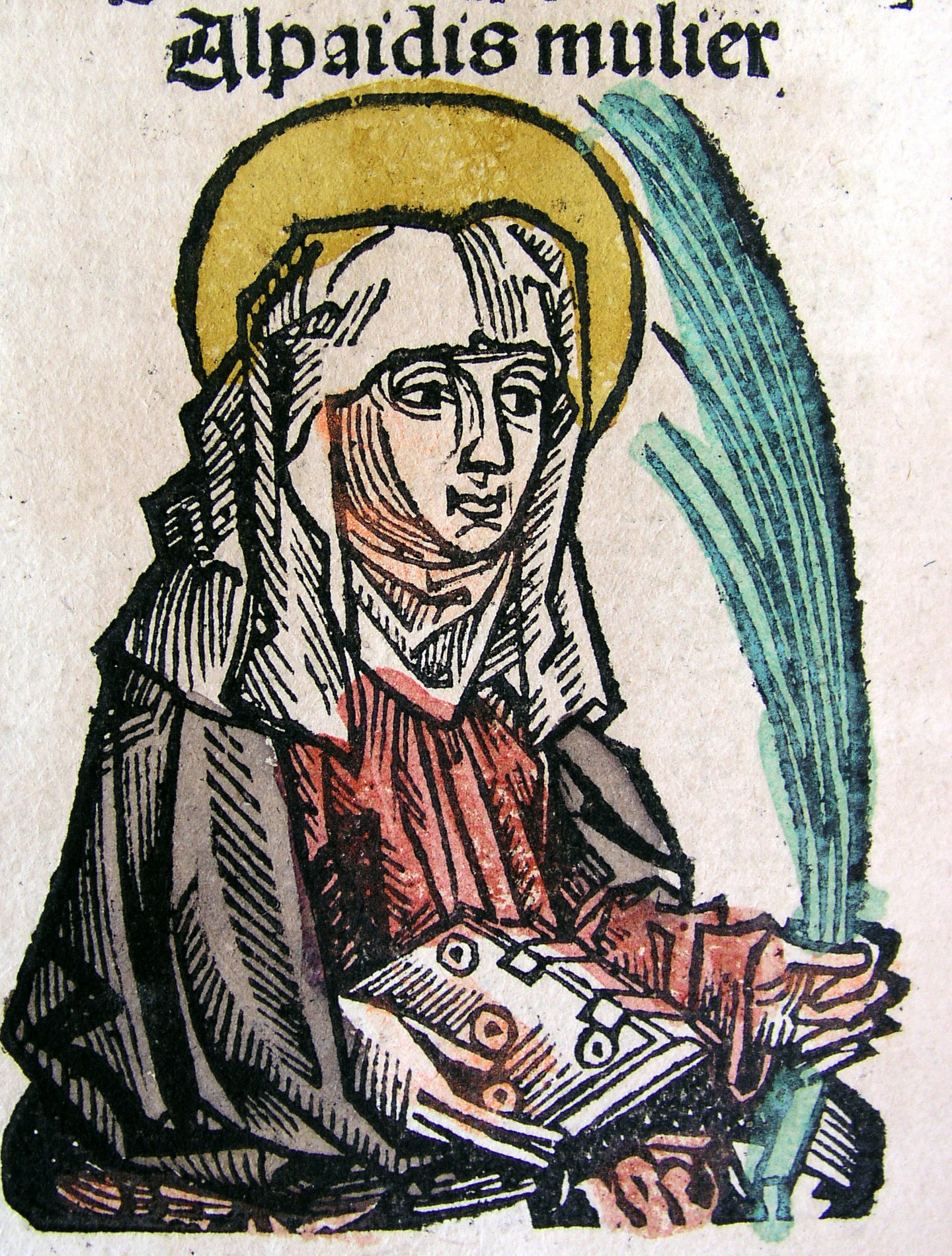
- Alpais of Cudot (from the Nuremberg Chronicle)
- Born: c. 1150; Cudot
- Died: November 3, 1211; Cudot
- Venerated in: Roman Catholic Church
- Beatified: 1874 by Pope Pius IX
- Feast: November 3

Alpaïs of Cudot also called Alpaida and Alpaidis († November 3, 1211) is venerated by the Catholic Church as a Blessed. Her vita was written c. 1180 by the monk Peter of the nearby Cistercian monastery of Les Écharlis.

== Life ==
Alpaïs was born some time between 1150-1155, into a peasant family of Cudot, in the diocese of Sens. After the death of her father, she worked in the fields with her brothers. When her strength weakened, she looked after the sheep. It was discovered that she had contracted leprosy. She was relegated to a small hut where her relatives brought her food. One day her brothers decided to abandon her and stop giving her food.

Some days later, her brothers, filled with remorse, return to find all traces of leprosy have disappeared which she attributed to the gentleness of the Virgin Mary. Although cured of the leprosy, she was paralyzed. She subsequently recovered the use of her right arm and hand. Alpaïs had frequent ecstasies during which she appeared as if asleep, almost dead. But when she woke up, she could describe her visions. The peasants from the surrounding area and then the Cistercian monks from a nearby abbey came to visit. Alpaïs became the counselor that people consulted.

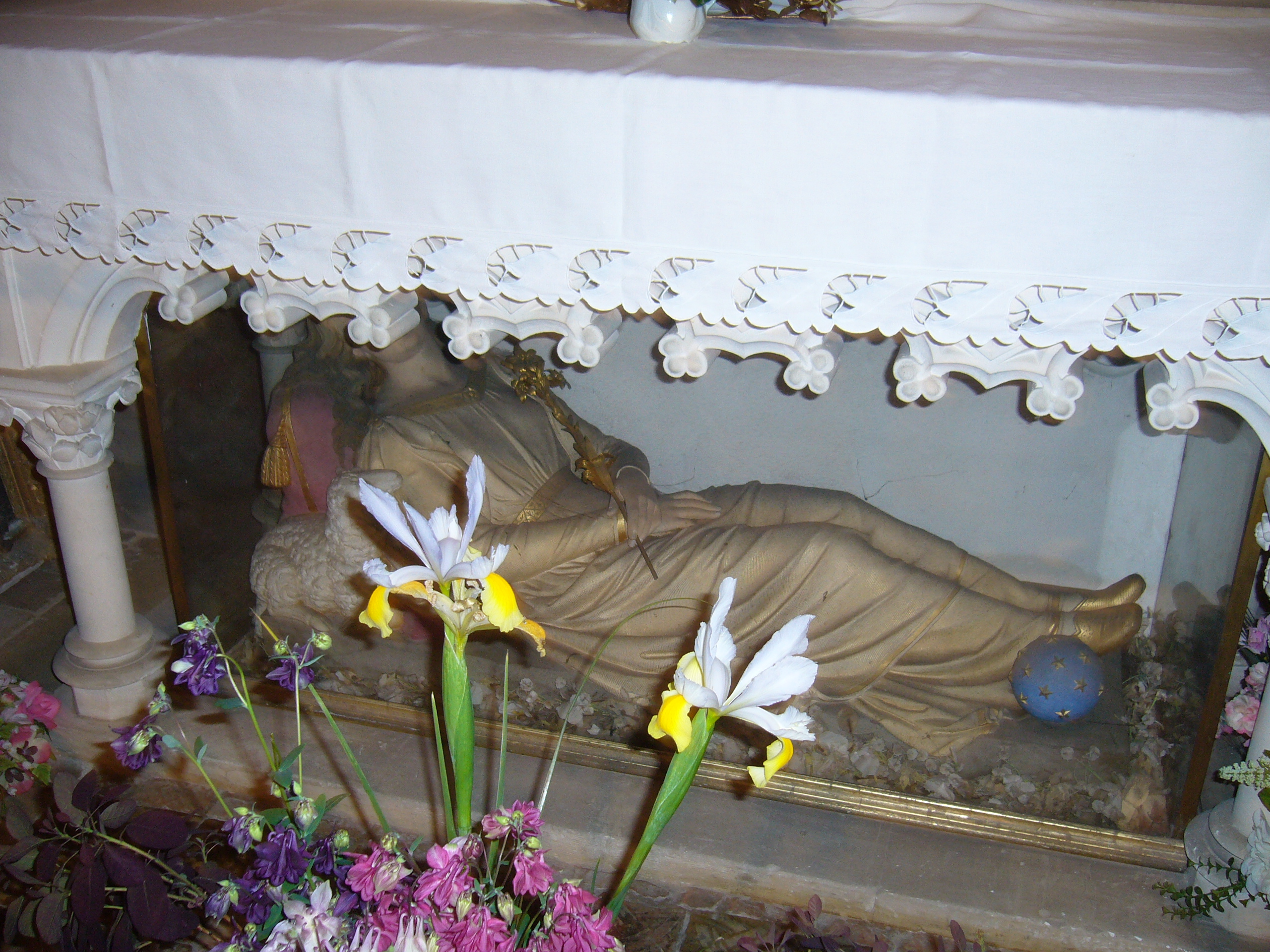
Reliquary of Saint Alpaïs in the church of Cudot (France).

The Archbishop of Sens, Guillaume de Champagne, decided to investigate. He came himself to visit the girl and decided to replace the hut with a cell and build an adjoining church so that she could attend Mass every day.

She denied herself food, and it is said that for a long time her only nourishment was the Eucharist. A story related of her states that once, she was brought pieces of pork to suck on by the prior of Cudot. Horrified by this, she sent the pork morsels to an old woman of the district to whom she usually sent table scraps and who was even poorer than she was.

== From the Life of Alpais of Cudot ==
And blessed Mary said to [Alpais]: "...because, dear sister, you bore long starvation in humility and patience, in hunger and thirst, without any murmuring, I grant you now to be fattened with an angelic and spiritual food. And as long as you are in this little body, corporeal food and drink will not be necessary for the sustaining of your body, nor will you hunger for bread or any other food... because after you have once tasted the celestial bread and drunk of the living fountain you will remain fattened for eternity..." And so it was... But in order that the tumult of gossip be quieted, since some said she had a devil –she who neither ate nor drank- two or three times a week she was accustomed to accept some morsel... and then spit it back... And I give this on my own testimony since I received in my own hand a little bit of masticated fish she spit out... Thus, rejoicing as if possessed, she frequently vomited from too much food, as if her drunkenness and inebriation were increased by anything beyond a tiny bit. And this was how and of what sort her preservation was, how and of what nature were the beginnings of her conversion, and how God underlined her merits and virtues with miracles... by which miracles manifest signs are given to the readers of [this story].

== Veneration ==
After her death, a priory was built on her tomb. Only the church remains in Cudot. Her cultus was confirmed by Pius IX in 1874. Her remains lay in the Church of Notre-Dame, Cudot. A statue of the saint Alpaïs was erected at the top of the facade of the church. The Archdiocese of Sens and Auxerre sponsors an annual pilgrimage to Cudot each Whit Monday.
