= Précy-sur-Vrin =

- Commune
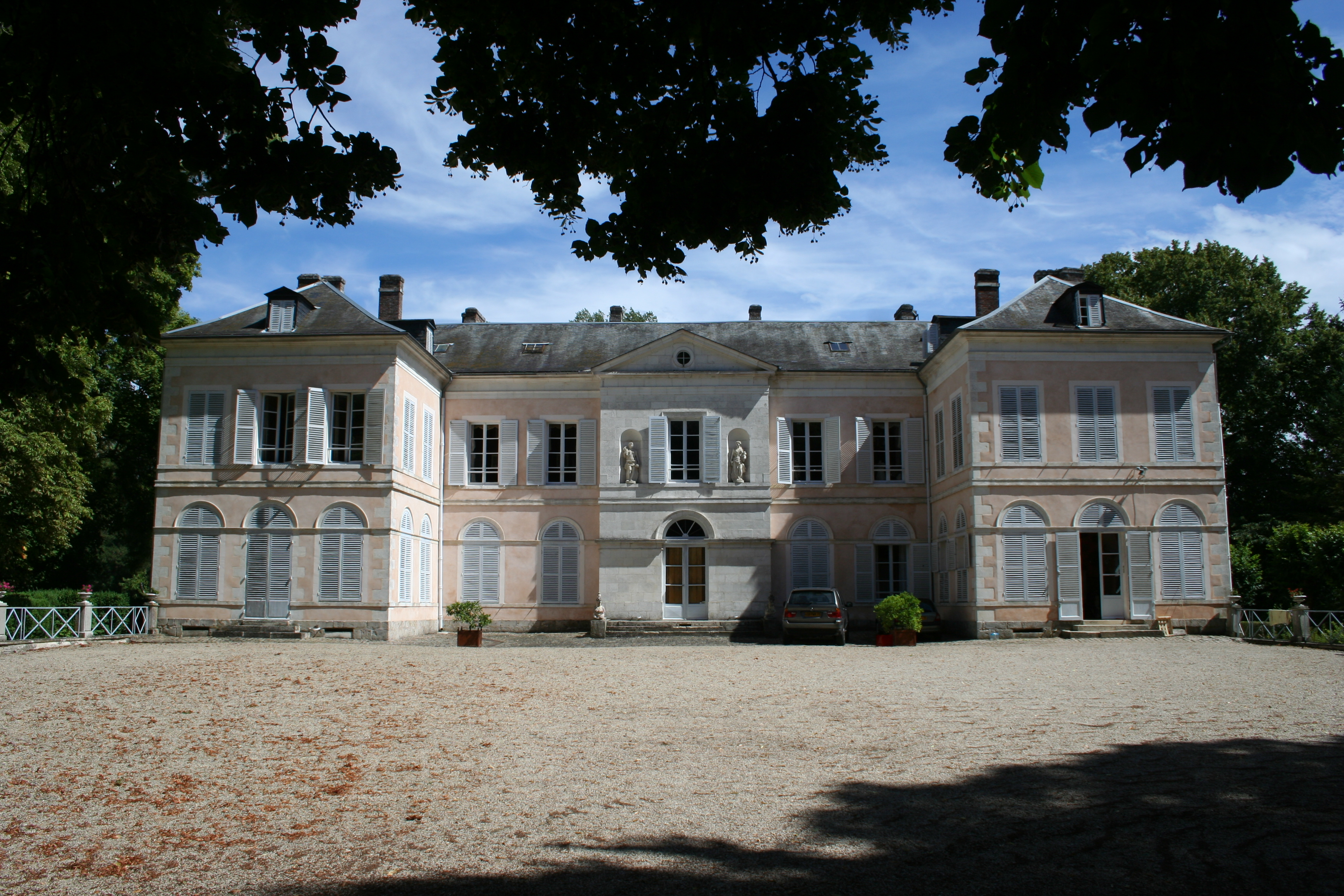
- The chateau in Précy-sur-Vrin
- Location of Précy-sur-Vrin
- Location within France Location within Bourgogne-Franche-Comté
- Coordinates: 47°58′05″N 3°14′54″E
- Country: France
- Region: Bourgogne-Franche-Comté
- Department: Yonne
- Arrondissement: Sens
- Canton: Joigny

Government
  - Mayor (2020–2026): Guy Avenia
- Area^{1}: 21.16 km^{2} (8.17 sq mi)
- Highest elevation: 193 m (633 ft)
- Lowest elevation: 98 m (322 ft)
- Population (2023): 427
  - Density: 20.2/km^{2} (52.3/sq mi)
- Time zone: UTC+01:00 (CET)
  - Summer (DST): UTC+02:00 (CEST)
- INSEE/Postal code: 89313 /89116
- ^{1} French Land Register data, which excludes lakes, ponds, glaciers > 1 km^{2} (0.386 sq mi or 247 acres) and river estuaries.

Précy-sur-Vrin (French pronunciation: [pʁesi syʁ vʁɛ̃]) is a commune in the Yonne department in Bourgogne-Franche-Comté in north-central France.

== See also ==
- Communes of the Yonne department
