= La Celle-Saint-Cyr =

- Commune
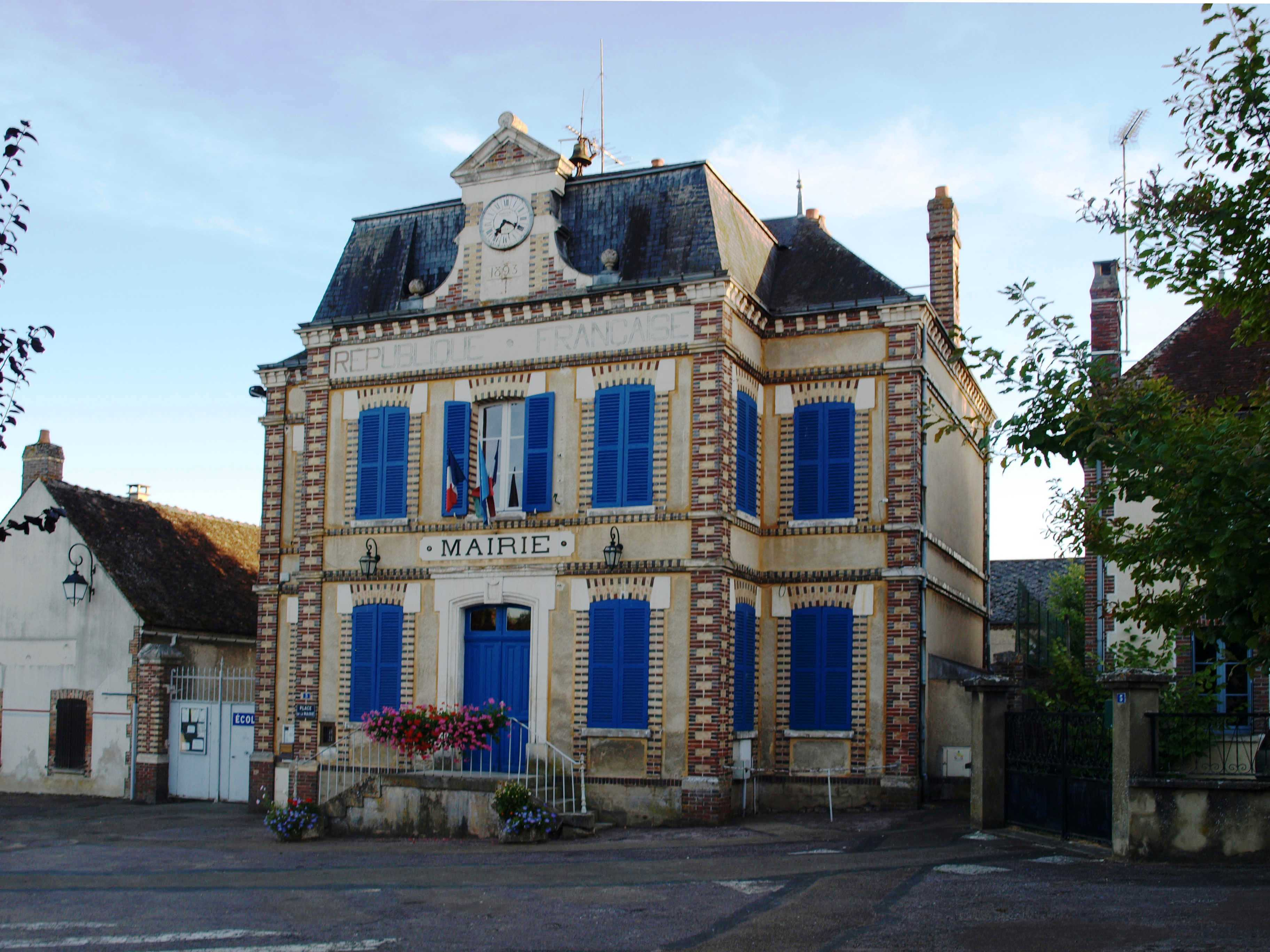
- The town hall in La Celle-Saint-Cyr

- Coat of arms
- Location of La Celle-Saint-Cyr
- Location within France Location within Bourgogne-Franche-Comté
- Coordinates: 47°58′25″N 3°17′26″E
- Country: France
- Region: Bourgogne-Franche-Comté
- Department: Yonne
- Arrondissement: Sens
- Canton: Joigny

Government
  - Mayor (2023–2026): Marie-Hélène Gouedard
- Area^{1}: 18.57 km^{2} (7.17 sq mi)
- Highest elevation: 197 m (646 ft)
- Lowest elevation: 83 m (272 ft)
- Population (2023): 840
  - Density: 45/km^{2} (120/sq mi)
- Time zone: UTC+01:00 (CET)
  - Summer (DST): UTC+02:00 (CEST)
- INSEE/Postal code: 89063 /89116
- ^{1} French Land Register data, which excludes lakes, ponds, glaciers > 1 km^{2} (0.386 sq mi or 247 acres) and river estuaries.

La Celle-Saint-Cyr (French pronunciation: [la sɛl sɛ̃ siʁ]) is a commune in the Yonne department in Bourgogne-Franche-Comté in north-central France.

== See also ==
- Communes of the Yonne department
