= Looze, Yonne =

Looze
- Commune
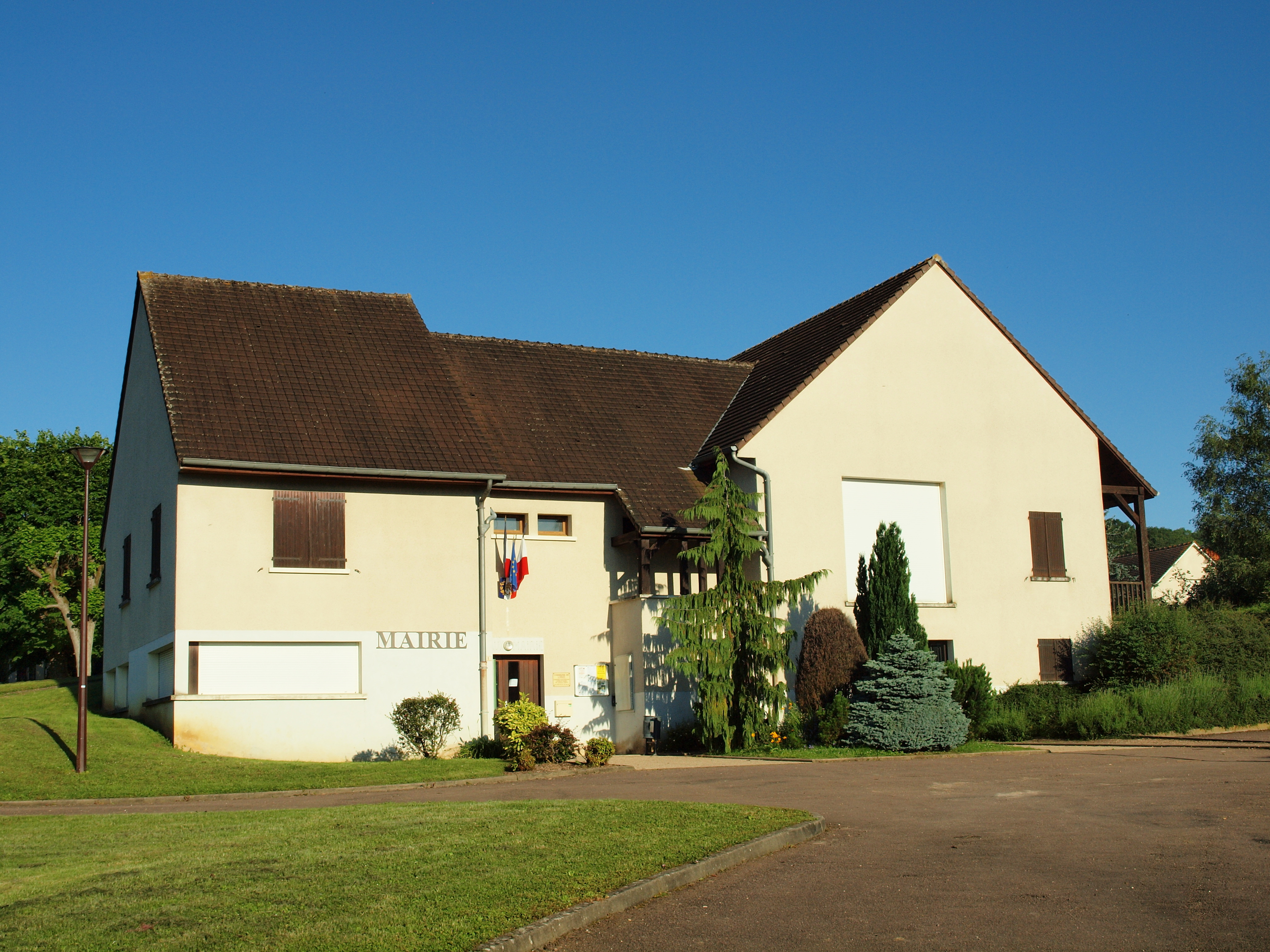
- The town hall in Looze
- Location of Looze
- Location within France Location within Bourgogne-Franche-Comté
- Coordinates: 47°59′36″N 3°26′27″E
- Country: France
- Region: Bourgogne-Franche-Comté
- Department: Yonne
- Arrondissement: Sens
- Canton: Joigny

Government
  - Mayor (2020–2026): Laurent Chat
- Area^{1}: 6.36 km^{2} (2.46 sq mi)
- Highest elevation: 224 m (735 ft)
- Lowest elevation: 99 m (325 ft)
- Population (2023): 443
  - Density: 69.7/km^{2} (180/sq mi)
- Time zone: UTC+01:00 (CET)
  - Summer (DST): UTC+02:00 (CEST)
- INSEE/Postal code: 89230 /89300
- ^{1} French Land Register data, which excludes lakes, ponds, glaciers > 1 km^{2} (0.386 sq mi or 247 acres) and river estuaries.

Looze (French pronunciation: [loz]) is a commune in the Yonne department in Bourgogne-Franche-Comté in north-central France.

== See also ==
- Communes of the Yonne department
