= Canton of Joigny =

Coordinates: 47.98°N 3.40°E

The canton of Joigny is an administrative division of the Yonne department, central France. Its borders were modified at the French canton reorganisation which came into effect in March 2015. Its seat is in Joigny.

It consists of the following communes:

1. Béon
2. La Celle-Saint-Cyr
3. Cézy
4. Champlay
5. Cudot
6. Joigny
7. Looze
8. Précy-sur-Vrin
9. Saint-Aubin-sur-Yonne
10. Saint-Julien-du-Sault
11. Saint-Loup-d'Ordon
12. Saint-Martin-d'Ordon
13. Verlin
14. Villecien
15. Villevallier
