= Scènes de la vie privée et publique des animaux =

1842 French parody with animal societies

Public and Private Lives of Animals
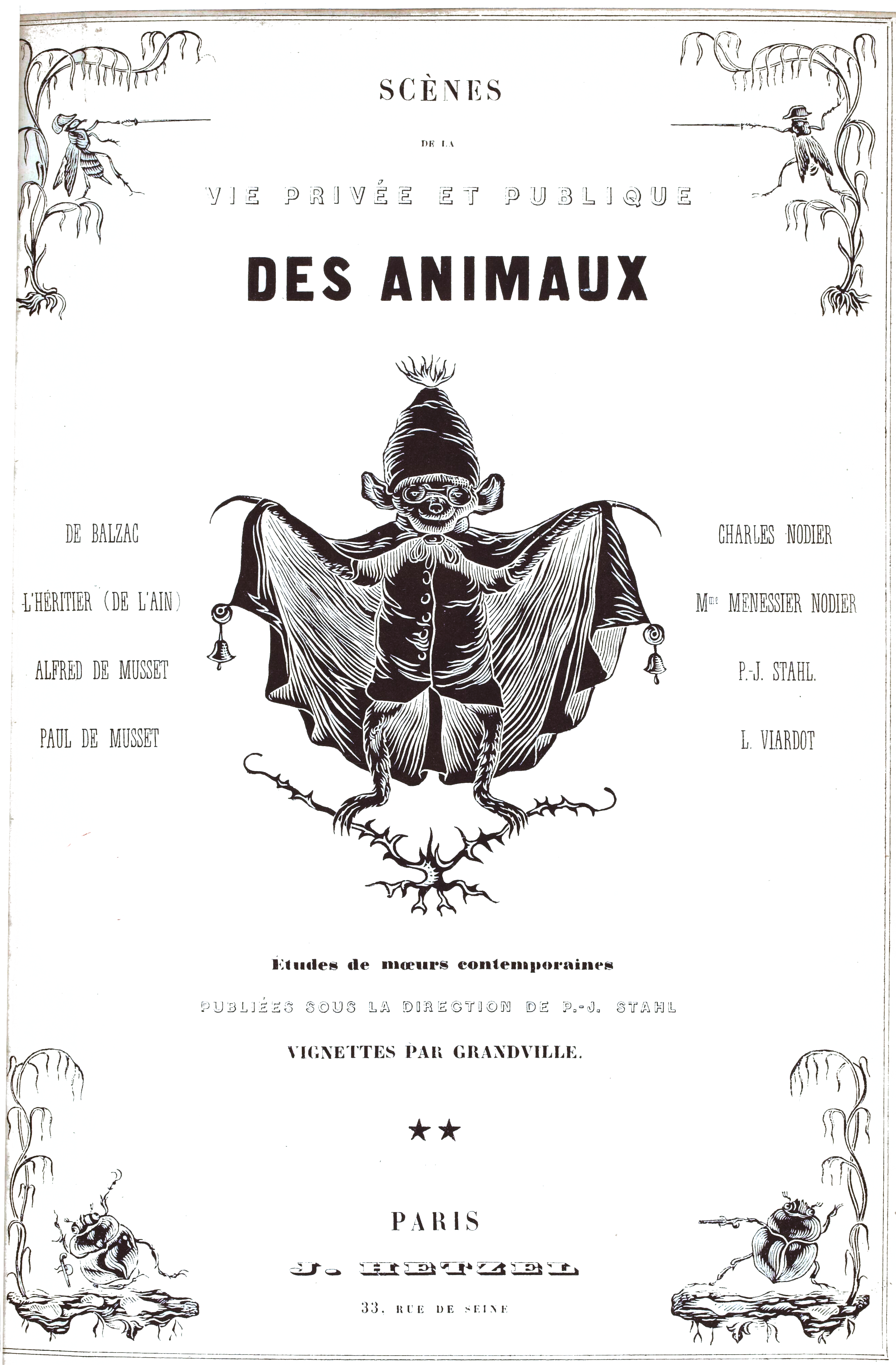
- The title page of the 1842 edition.
- Original title: Scène de la vie privée et publique des animaux
- Language: French
- Genre: Parody
- Published: 1840-1842
- Publication place: France
- Media type: Print
- Dewey Decimal: 841.8
- LC Class: PQ2191 .F6

Scènes de la vie privée et publique des animaux (1842) was an illustrated work of French parody published in the aftermath of the French Revolution. First published completely in 1842, with some parts coming as early as November 20, 1840, it was produced by "P. J. Stahl" (Pierre-Jules Hetzel) in collaboration with Honoré de Balzac, Antoine Gustave Droz , Émile Lemoine, Jules Janin, George Sand, Charles Nodier, Marie Mennessier-Nodier, and Alfred de Musset; and illustrated by J. J. Grandville (Jean Ignace Isidore Gérard), it proved to be best-seller, selling 25,000 copies. Several editions were later published with the title altered as La Vie privée et publique des animaux (1867) and Les Animaux peints par eux-mêmes et dessinés par un autre (The Animals Painted by Themselves and Drawn by Another). An English translation Public and Private Lives of Animals (1876) was produced by J. Thompson.

== History and overview ==
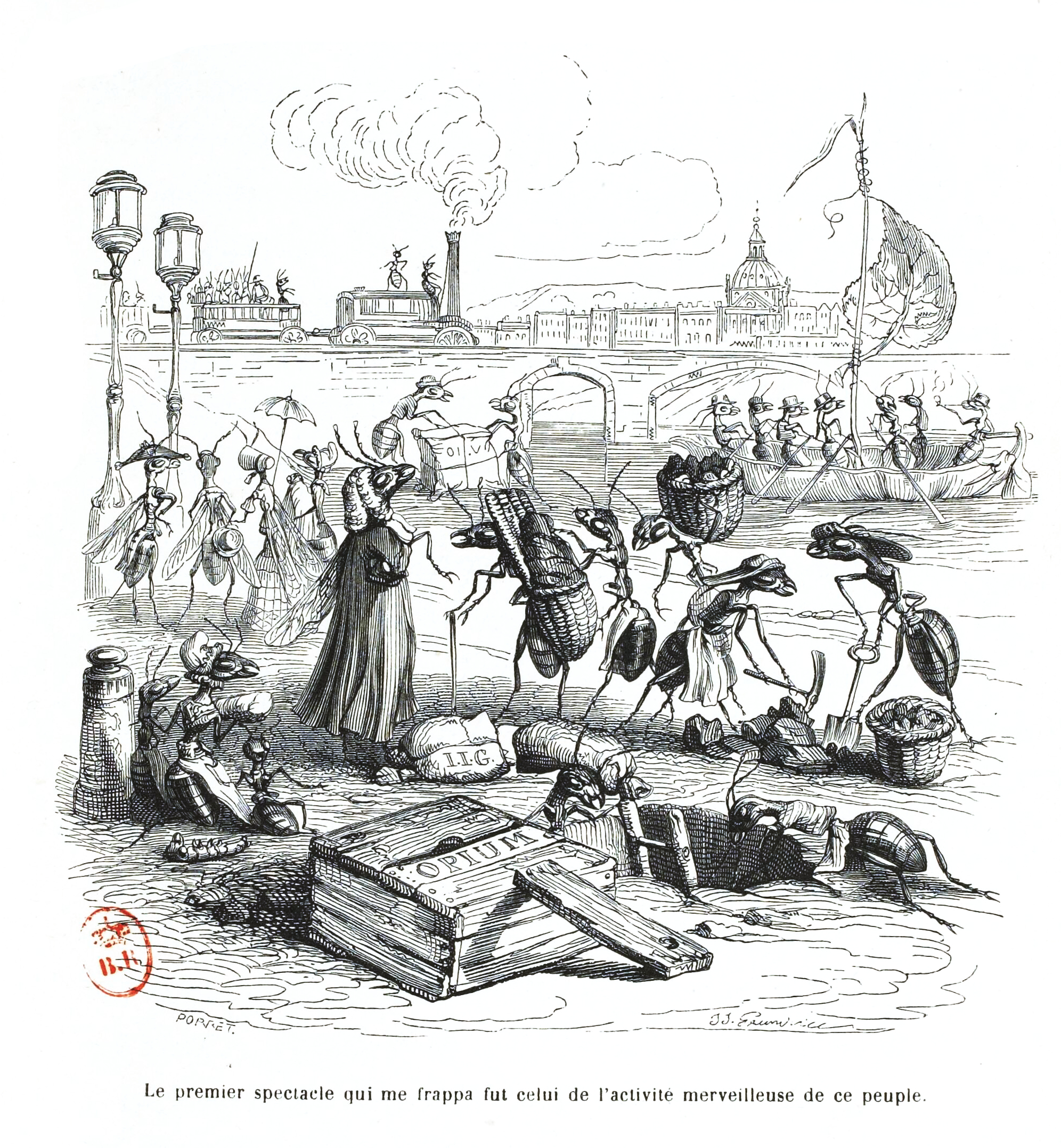
The sparrow visits the island of "Vieille Formication".

Hetzel's wrote to the collaborating authors indicating that all texts were to be in the first person of an animal narrator. In the first volume the apologues have a preface by Hetzel. The second volume begins with a call for another revolution. The book begins when the animals decide to end human tyranny and form a parliament at the Jardin des Plantes in Paris. The Jardin had become a place of great public interaction in the 1840s. In the various stories storks personified free and harmonious people while the wolves (of Ukraine) were considered as being strictly egalitarian. Many of the essays examine the quest for better governance and society with animals being models.

The chapter layout and authorship (titles translated) are:

=== Volume 1 ===
- P.-J. Stahl, Prologue.
- P.-J. Stahl, Story of a Hare.
- Balzac, Heartache of an English Cat.
- P.-J. Stahl, The Adventures of a Butterfly.
- Émile de La Bédollière, The Contrarieties of a Crocodile.
- P.-J. Stahl, Funeral oration of a silkworm.
- Under the signature of George Sand but written by Balzac: Journey of a Paris sparrow in search of the best government.
- Gustave Droz, The Grievances of an Old Toad.
- Jules Janin, The Theatrical Critic.
- Édouard Lemoine, The Philosophical Rat.
- Paul de Musset, The Sorrows of a Beetle.
- Charles Nodier, A Fox Trapped.
- Balzac, Donkey guide for animals who want to achieve honors
- Gustave Droz, The Contradictions of a Greyhound.
- Louis Viardot, Topaz the portrait painter.
- Balzac, Journey of an African Lion to Paris.

=== Volume 2 ===
- P.-J. Stahl, Another revolution.
- Alfred de Musset, Story of a white blackbird.
- Gustave Droz, The Queen's Husband.
- Balzac, The Loves of Two Beasts.
- P.-J. Stahl, The Heartaches of a French Cat.
- Émile de La Bédollière, Causes Célébres.
- L. Baude, The Bear.
- P.-J. Stahl, The Seventh Heaven
- Marie Mennessier-Nodier, Letters from a swallow to a serin.
- Pierre Bernard, The Animal Doctors.
- Charles Nodier, Tablets of the Giraffe.
- Gustave Droz, Sour Remarks of a Raven.
- P.-J. Stahl, Memories of an old crow.
- P.-J. Stahl, Last chapter.

The chapter "Voyage d'un Moineau de Paris à la Recherche du Meilleur Gouvernement" ("The Flight of a Parisian Bird in Search of a Better Government") begins with a youthful French sparrow which has a comfortable life thanks to grains grown by humans visiting other parts of the world and wonders why sparrows do not have a good social organization unlike the ducks and crows. The first society he visits is the empire of the ants (Britain).

The book was a great success and sold 25,000 copies which annoyed Balzac. He considered it a stupid work that sold only because of its pictures. Grandville received 18,000 francs for the work while Balzac had received 15,000 for La Comedie humaine and only 1,200 francs for his Scenes de la vie privée (1830).
