= Saint-Julien-du-Sault =

- Commune
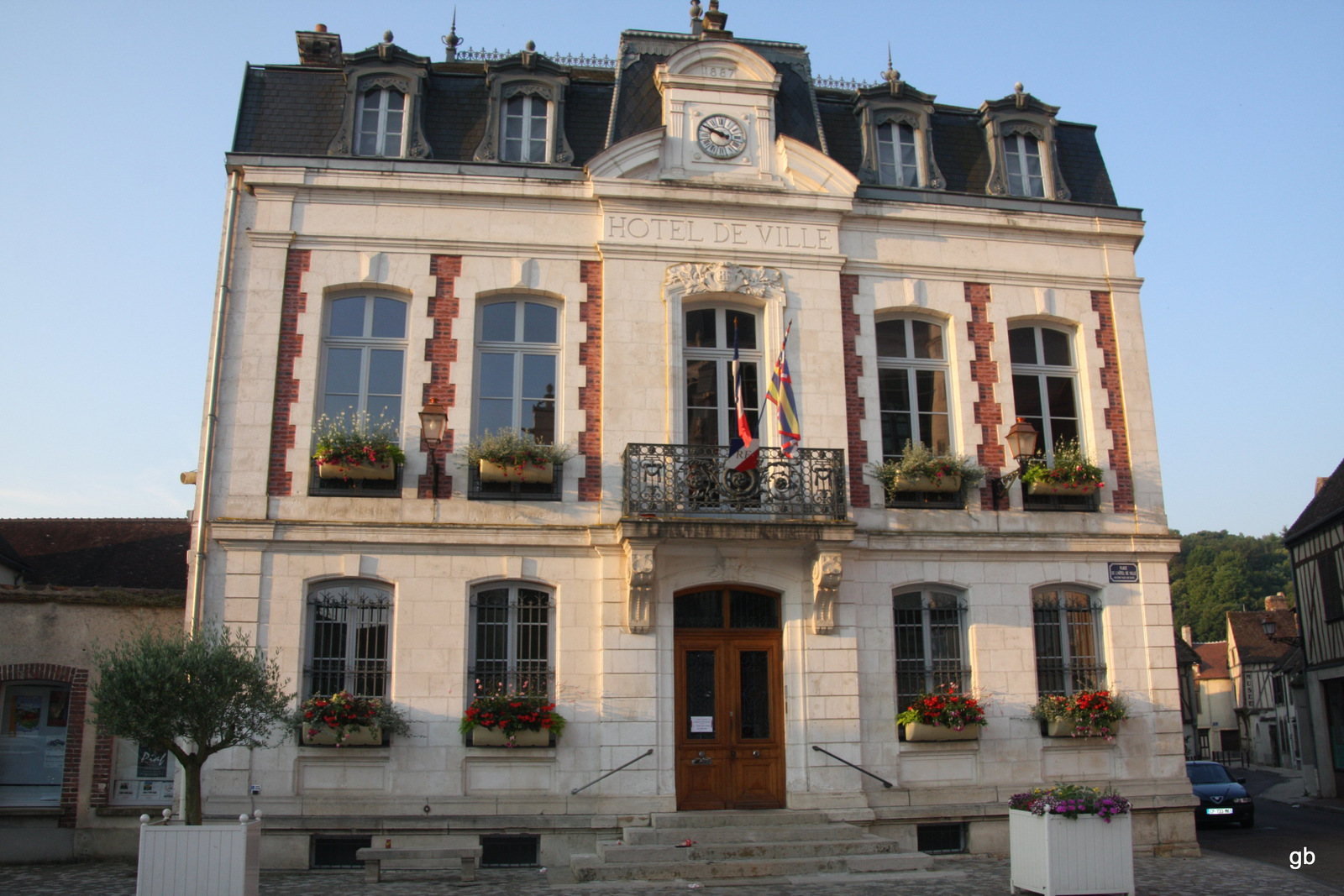
- The town hall in Saint-Julien-du-Sault

- Coat of arms
- Location of Saint-Julien-du-Sault
- Location within France Location within Bourgogne-Franche-Comté
- Coordinates: 48°01′58″N 3°17′45″E
- Country: France
- Region: Bourgogne-Franche-Comté
- Department: Yonne
- Arrondissement: Sens
- Canton: Joigny

Government
  - Mayor (2020–2026): Guy Bourras
- Area^{1}: 23.81 km^{2} (9.19 sq mi)
- Highest elevation: 194 m (636 ft)
- Lowest elevation: 70 m (230 ft)
- Population (2023): 2,173
  - Density: 91.26/km^{2} (236.4/sq mi)
- Time zone: UTC+01:00 (CET)
  - Summer (DST): UTC+02:00 (CEST)
- INSEE/Postal code: 89348 /89330
- ^{1} French Land Register data, which excludes lakes, ponds, glaciers > 1 km^{2} (0.386 sq mi or 247 acres) and river estuaries.

Saint-Julien-du-Sault (French pronunciation: [sɛ̃ ʒyljɛ̃ dy so]) is a commune in the Yonne department in Bourgogne-Franche-Comté in north-central France.

== Population ==
Historical population
Year	Pop.	±% p.a.
1968	1,856	—
1975	2,123	+1.94%
1982	2,067	−0.38%
1990	2,161	+0.56%
1999	2,347	+0.92%
2007	2,353	+0.03%
2012	2,366	+0.11%
2017	2,348	−0.15%
2023	2,173	−1.28%
Source: INSEE

== See also ==
- Communes of the Yonne department
