= Saint-Martin-d'Ordon =

- Commune
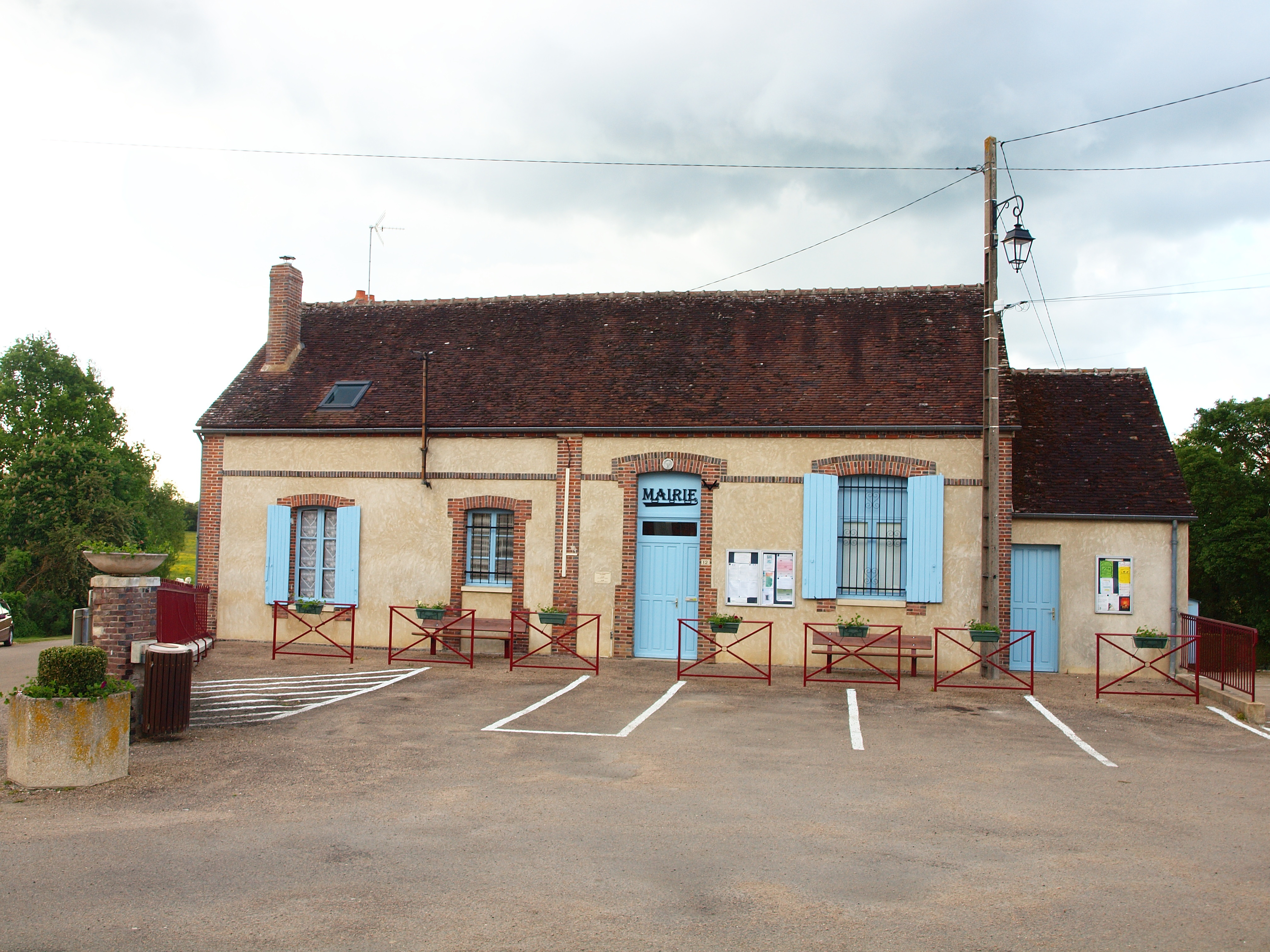
- The town hall in Saint-Martin-d'Ordon

- Coat of arms
- Location of Saint-Martin-d'Ordon
- Location within France Location within Bourgogne-Franche-Comté
- Coordinates: 48°01′27″N 3°10′35″E
- Country: France
- Region: Bourgogne-Franche-Comté
- Department: Yonne
- Arrondissement: Sens
- Canton: Joigny

Government
  - Mayor (2020–2026): Isabelle Claudet
- Area^{1}: 10.17 km^{2} (3.93 sq mi)
- Highest elevation: 197 m (646 ft)
- Lowest elevation: 126 m (413 ft)
- Population (2023): 419
  - Density: 41.2/km^{2} (107/sq mi)
- Time zone: UTC+01:00 (CET)
  - Summer (DST): UTC+02:00 (CEST)
- INSEE/Postal code: 89353 /89330
- ^{1} French Land Register data, which excludes lakes, ponds, glaciers > 1 km^{2} (0.386 sq mi or 247 acres) and river estuaries.

Saint-Martin-d'Ordon (French pronunciation: [sɛ̃ maʁtɛ̃ dɔʁdɔ̃]) is a commune in the Yonne department in Bourgogne-Franche-Comté in north-central France.

== See also ==
- Communes of the Yonne department
