= Béon, Yonne =

Béon
- Commune
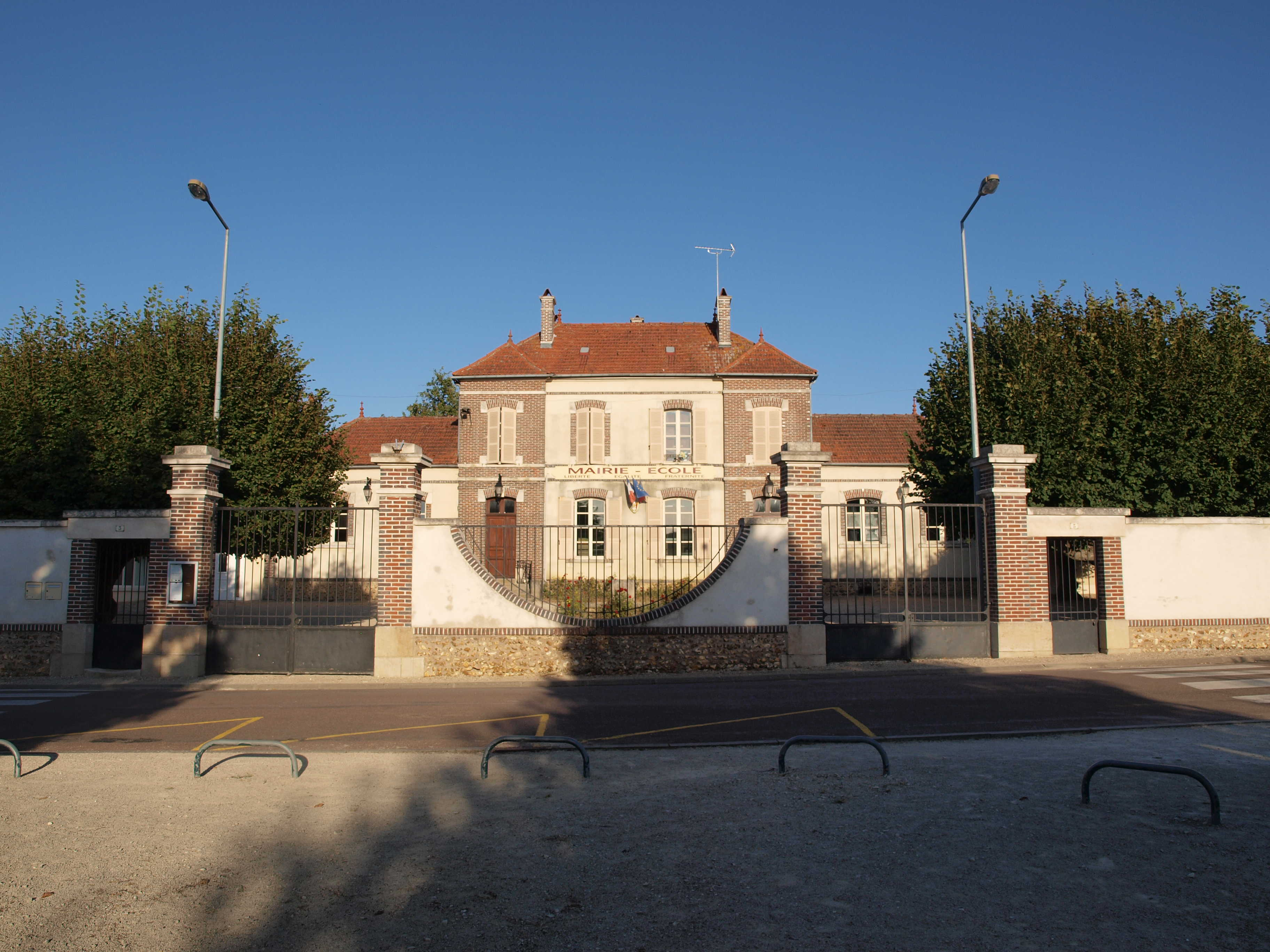
- The town hall and school in Béon
- Location of Béon
- Location within France Location within Bourgogne-Franche-Comté
- Coordinates: 47°57′26″N 3°19′23″E
- Country: France
- Region: Bourgogne-Franche-Comté
- Department: Yonne
- Arrondissement: Sens
- Canton: Joigny

Government
  - Mayor (2020–2026): Didier Moreau
- Area^{1}: 15.41 km^{2} (5.95 sq mi)
- Highest elevation: 217 m (712 ft)
- Lowest elevation: 77 m (253 ft)
- Population (2023): 519
  - Density: 33.7/km^{2} (87.2/sq mi)
- Time zone: UTC+01:00 (CET)
  - Summer (DST): UTC+02:00 (CEST)
- INSEE/Postal code: 89037 /89410
- ^{1} French Land Register data, which excludes lakes, ponds, glaciers > 1 km^{2} (0.386 sq mi or 247 acres) and river estuaries.

Béon (French pronunciation: [beɔ̃]) is a commune in the Yonne department in Bourgogne-Franche-Comté in north-central France.

== Population ==
Historical population
Year	Pop.	±% p.a.
1968	328	—
1975	320	−0.35%
1982	406	+3.46%
1990	455	+1.43%
1999	476	+0.50%
2007	507	+0.79%
2012	525	+0.70%
2017	510	−0.58%
2023	519	+0.29%
Source: INSEE

== See also ==
- Communes of the Yonne department
