= Villevallier =

- Commune
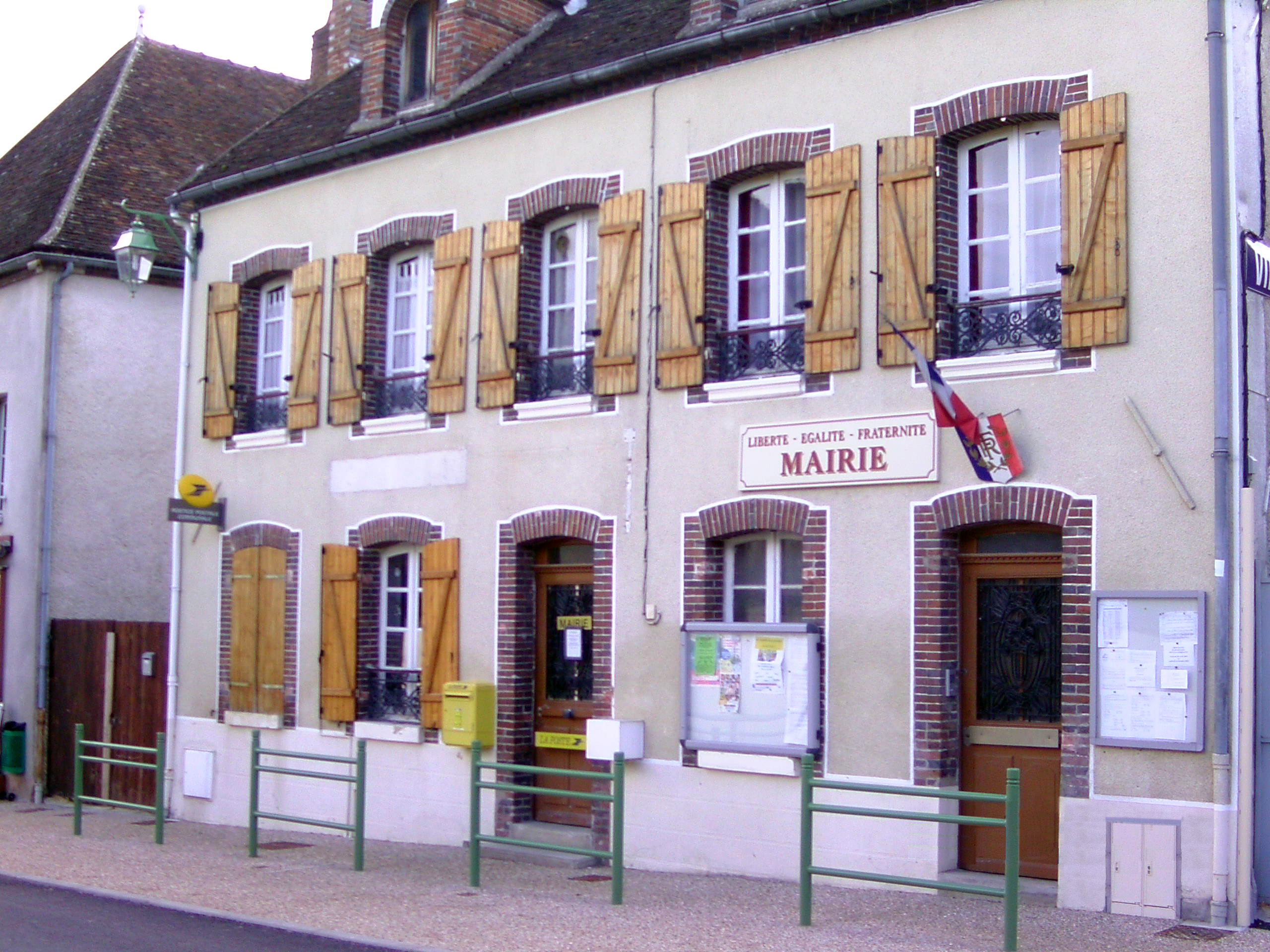
- The town hall in Villevallier
- Location of Villevallier
- Location within France Location within Bourgogne-Franche-Comté
- Coordinates: 48°01′32″N 3°18′52″E
- Country: France
- Region: Bourgogne-Franche-Comté
- Department: Yonne
- Arrondissement: Sens
- Canton: Joigny

Government
  - Mayor (2020–2026): Jean-Marc Grillet-Aubert
- Area^{1}: 8.37 km^{2} (3.23 sq mi)
- Highest elevation: 211 m (692 ft)
- Lowest elevation: 72 m (236 ft)
- Population (2023): 416
  - Density: 49.7/km^{2} (129/sq mi)
- Time zone: UTC+01:00 (CET)
  - Summer (DST): UTC+02:00 (CEST)
- INSEE/Postal code: 89468 /89330
- ^{1} French Land Register data, which excludes lakes, ponds, glaciers > 1 km^{2} (0.386 sq mi or 247 acres) and river estuaries.

Villevallier (French pronunciation: [vilvalje]) is a commune in the Yonne department in Bourgogne-Franche-Comté in north-central France.

== See also ==
- Communes of the Yonne department
