= Cudot =

- Commune
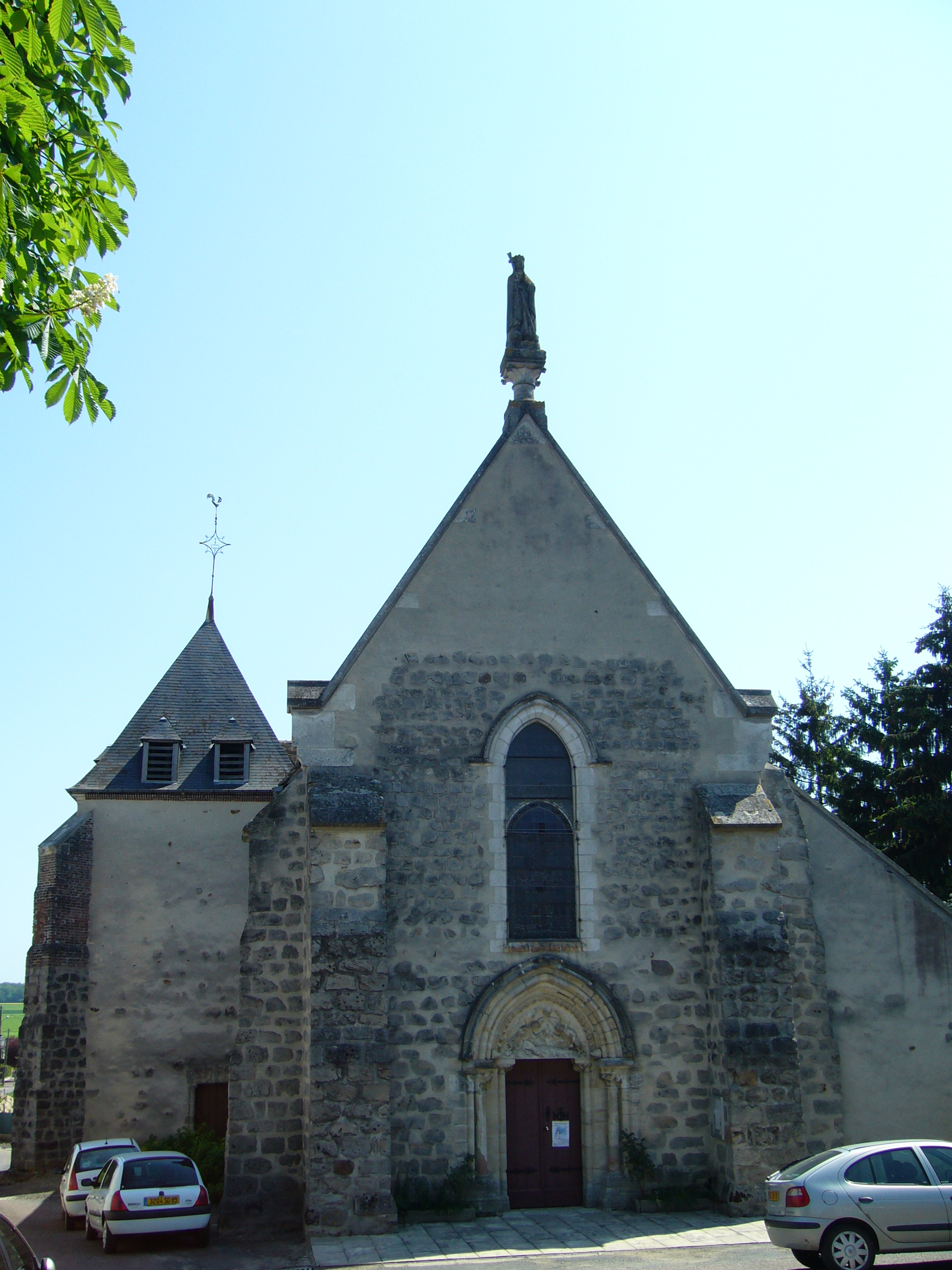
- Notre-Dame-de-l'Assomption Church, where the remains of Saint Alpaïs of Cudot are kept.

- Coat of arms
- Location of Cudot
- Location within France Location within Bourgogne-Franche-Comté
- Coordinates: 47°59′05″N 3°10′49″E
- Country: France
- Region: Bourgogne-Franche-Comté
- Department: Yonne
- Arrondissement: Sens
- Canton: Joigny

Government
  - Mayor (2020–2026): Gérard Vergnaud
- Area^{1}: 19.11 km^{2} (7.38 sq mi)
- Highest elevation: 202 m (663 ft)
- Lowest elevation: 141 m (463 ft)
- Population (2023): 395
  - Density: 20.7/km^{2} (53.5/sq mi)
- Time zone: UTC+01:00 (CET)
  - Summer (DST): UTC+02:00 (CEST)
- INSEE/Postal code: 89133 /89116
- ^{1} French Land Register data, which excludes lakes, ponds, glaciers > 1 km^{2} (0.386 sq mi or 247 acres) and river estuaries.

Cudot (French pronunciation: [kydo]) is a commune in the Yonne department in Bourgogne-Franche-Comté in north-central France.

== See also ==
- Communes of the Yonne department
- Saint Alpaïs of Cudot
