= Church of Notre-Dame, Cudot =

Church in Bourgogne-Franche-Comté, France

Coordinates: 47°59′01″N 3°10′49″E

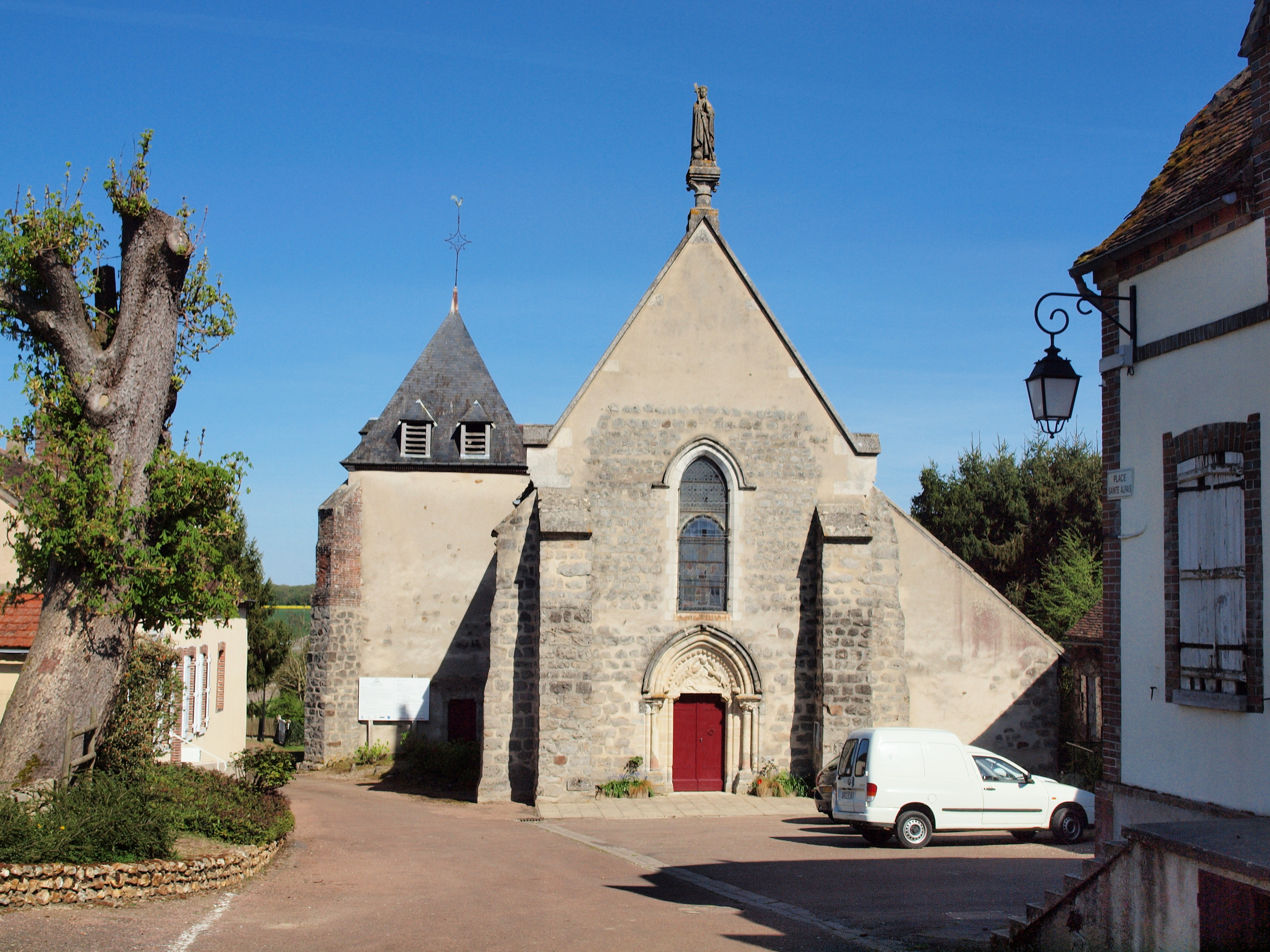
Facade of the church.

The Church of Notre-Dame (French: Église Notre-Dame-de-l'Assomption) is the village church of Cudot in Yonne department (Bourgogne-Franche-Comté, France). It is dedicated to Our Lady of the Assumption and it is a church of the Archdiocese of Sens-Auxerre. It is known to shelter the relics of St Alpaïs of Cudot, who died in 1211.

== History ==
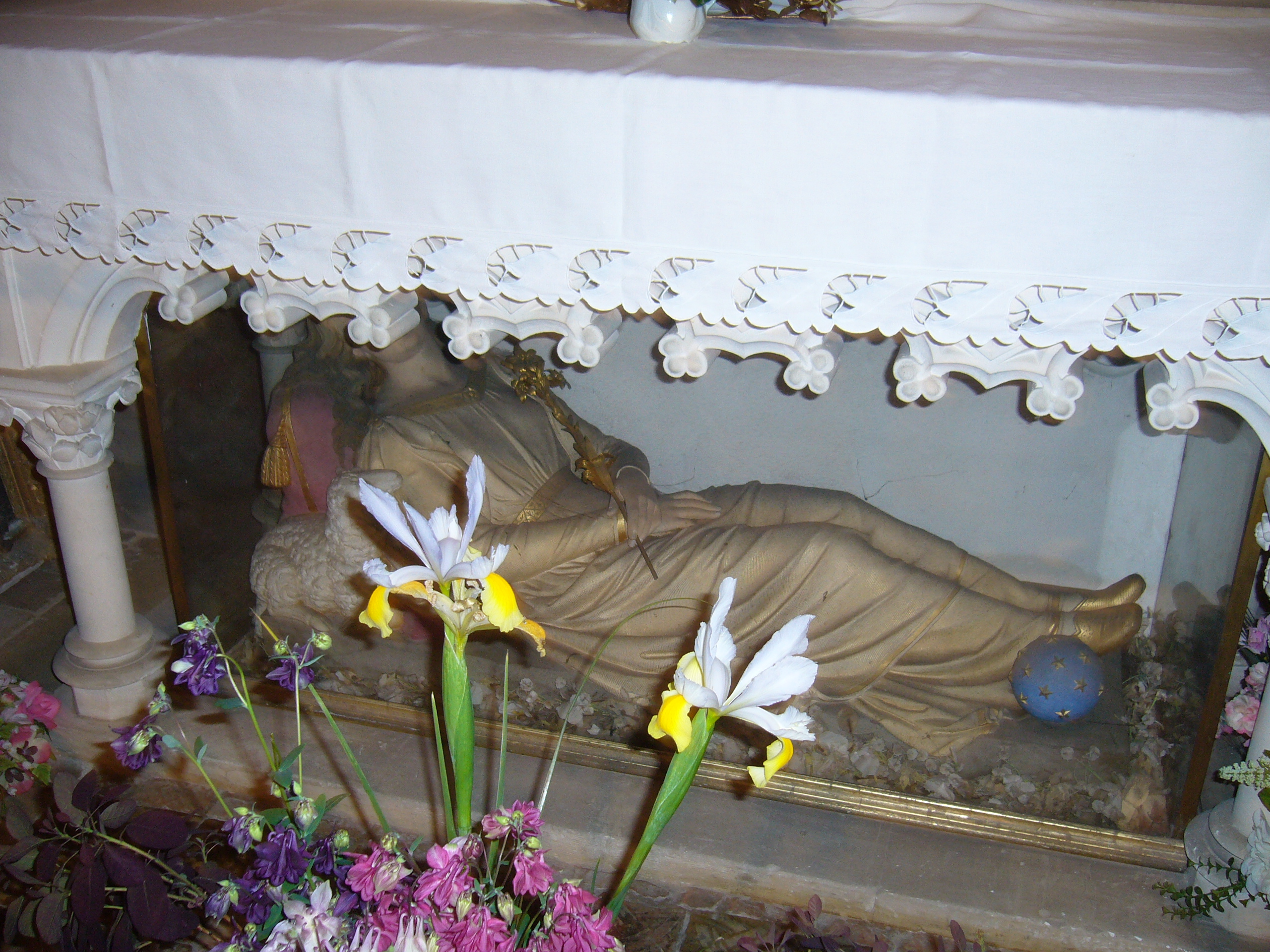
Reliquary of Saint Alpaïs.

The church of Cudot was built in the 12th century. The statue of Saint Alpaïs was erected at the top of the facade in 1874, when Pope Pius IX confirmed the cult of the saint. She lived as a hermit in Cudot, after being miraculously cured of a serious skin disease. Her only nourishment was the Eucharist. The Gothic tympanum of the portal made in 13th century by order of Bishop Peter of Corbeil recalls the Dormition of the Virgin Mary, with her corpse flanked by two angels and with arches of flowers.

In the nave, the copper and glass reliquary made in 19th century under the altar shows the lying saint.

Every Monday after Pentecost a procession and a solemn mass are organized by the diocese.

The church was registered in 1976 as a monument historique.
