= Cézy =

- Commune
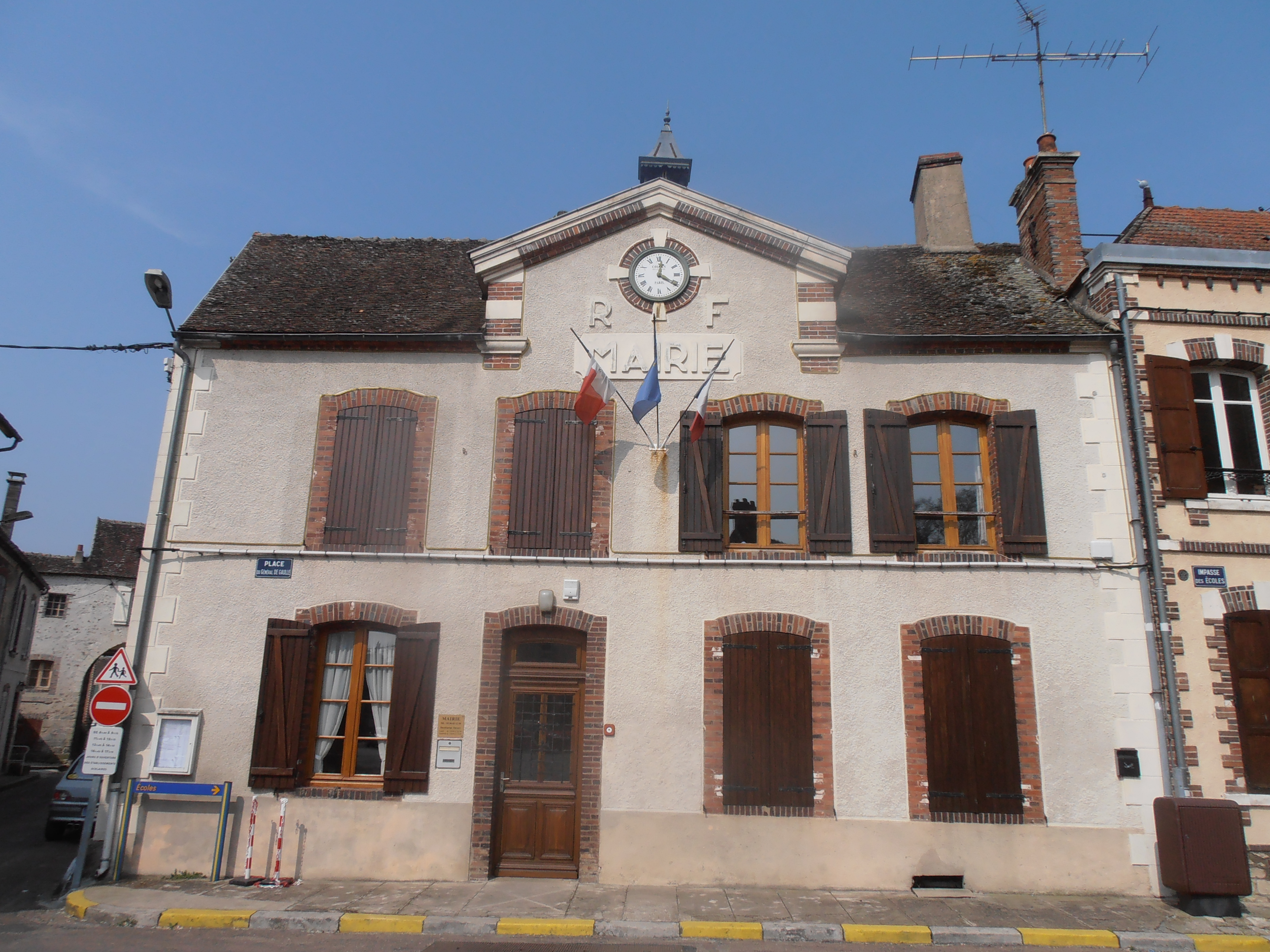
- The town hall in Cézy

- Coat of arms
- Location of Cézy
- Location within France Location within Bourgogne-Franche-Comté
- Coordinates: 47°59′35″N 3°20′29″E
- Country: France
- Region: Bourgogne-Franche-Comté
- Department: Yonne
- Arrondissement: Sens
- Canton: Joigny

Government
  - Mayor (2020–2026): Cyril Haghebaert
- Area^{1}: 16.02 km^{2} (6.19 sq mi)
- Highest elevation: 187 m (614 ft)
- Lowest elevation: 72 m (236 ft)
- Population (2023): 1,070
  - Density: 66.8/km^{2} (173/sq mi)
- Time zone: UTC+01:00 (CET)
  - Summer (DST): UTC+02:00 (CEST)
- INSEE/Postal code: 89067 /89410
- ^{1} French Land Register data, which excludes lakes, ponds, glaciers > 1 km^{2} (0.386 sq mi or 247 acres) and river estuaries.

Cézy (French pronunciation: [sezi]) is a commune in the Yonne department in Bourgogne-Franche-Comté in north-central France.

== See also ==
- Communes of the Yonne department
