= Église Notre-Dame de l'Assomption, Metz =

Church in Metz, Lorraine, France

Coordinates: 49.1166°N 6.1778°E

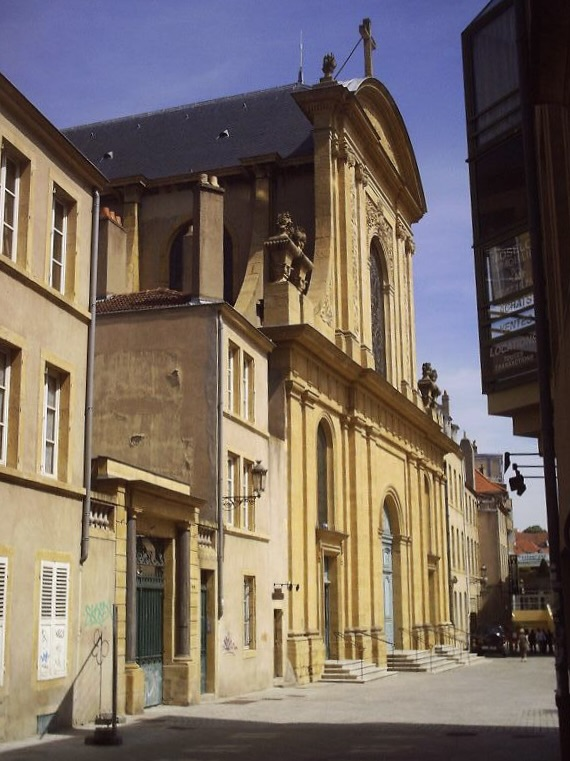
Notre-Dame de l'Assomption, Metz

Notre-Dame de l'Assomption is a church situated on the Rue de la Chevre, formerly the Rue de la Cheuve, in the city of Metz in Lorraine, France. Administratively it is part of the Roman Catholic Diocese of Metz.

== Architecture and Artworks ==
It is one of the largest examples of a church which is unmistakably Jesuit in character. Its architecture – notably its two-storeyed facade with Doric columns – is heavily influenced by the architecture of a Jesuit novitiate building in Paris, and its most significant artworks were inspired by Nicolas Poussin, whose first major paintings were also for the Jesuits.

The confessionals are from the 18th century. Statues include some by Molknecht (1830). The stained glass windows are by Laurent-Charles Maréchal and Louis-Napoléon Gugnon(1840). Large paintings, both framed and mural, line the walls and are of unknown origin.

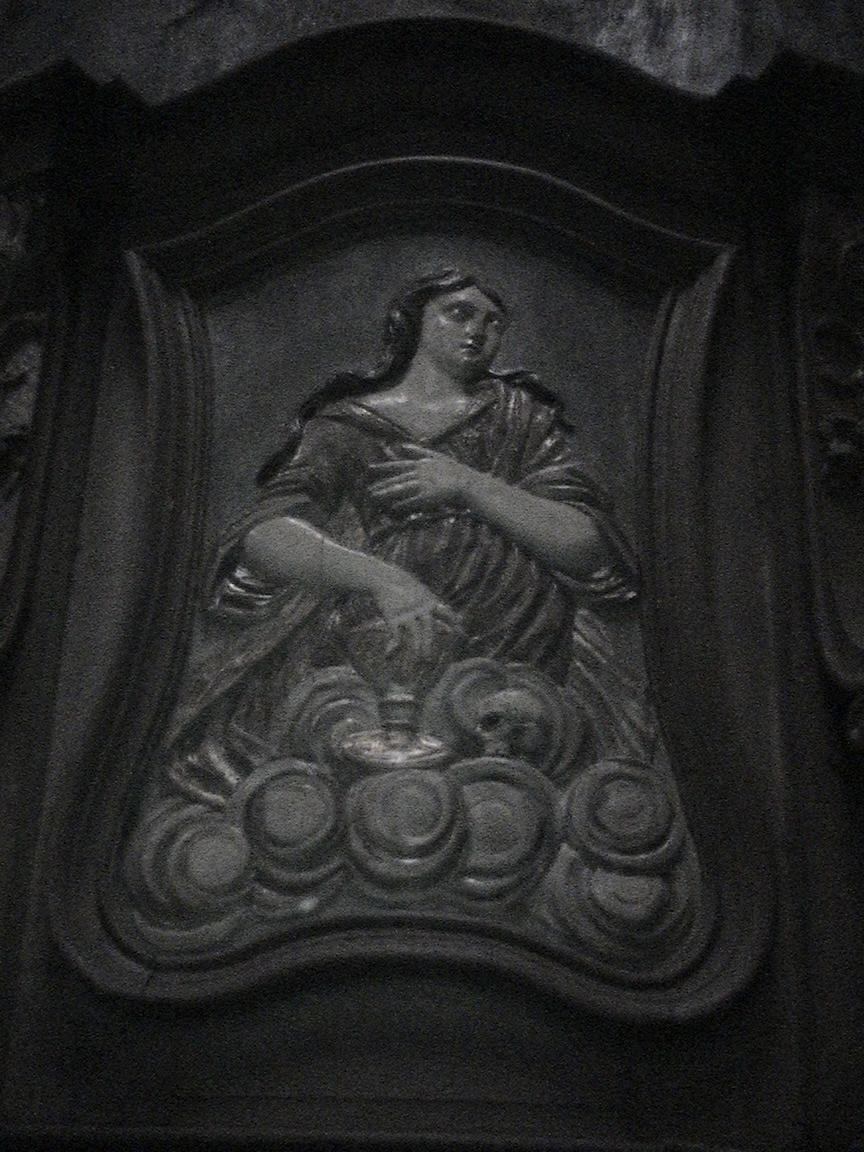
Woodcarving of St Mary Magdalene with chalice, waves, and skull

== History before the Revolution ==
Originally a Calvinist temple built in 1576, the church was closed down shortly after construction and in 1642 was given to the Jesuits by Louis XIII. Known by Protestants as the "Crêve-Cœur" (Broken Heart), it became an important part of the complex which included a religious college and was the Jesuits' main residence in Lorraine.

Construction work was interrupted in 1653, continued in 1735 and completed in 1739. The complex ceased to function only when the Jesuit order was suppressed in 1762, accused by the French parliament of teaching immorality.

In 1744 the church was visited by Marie Leszczynska, queen of France, and the dauphin Louis, for a ceremony of thanks for the recovery of king Louis XV, who had fallen ill in Metz. In the guise of a panegyric to Saint Louis, the priest bestowed on the king the title of "Louis Well-Beloved" (Louis le Bien Aimé), under which name he was known thereafter.

== Period of the Revolution ==
During the Revolution, the revolutionary authorities dechristianised France and nationalised all church property. The former church of Notre Dame de Metz became the central meeting place for the city's Jacobin club. After the national assembly banned the clubs in 1795, it became Metz's Temple of Reason (Temple Decadaire).

== From the First Empire to Today ==
In 1803 the government of the First Empire gave the building back to the Roman Catholic church.

Today the church is a place of Marian devotion and is the church of the city's artists.

Its Cavaillé-Coll organ was installed by Charles-Marie Widor, and has been played by some of the leading organists in France, including Marcel Dupré, Jean Langlais, Maurice Duruflé, and Marie-Claire Alain.

== See also ==
- List of Jesuit sites

== Bibliography ==
Chabert, Francois Michel, Histoire et description de l’église Notre-Dame de la ville de Metz, 1852
