= Champlay =

- Commune
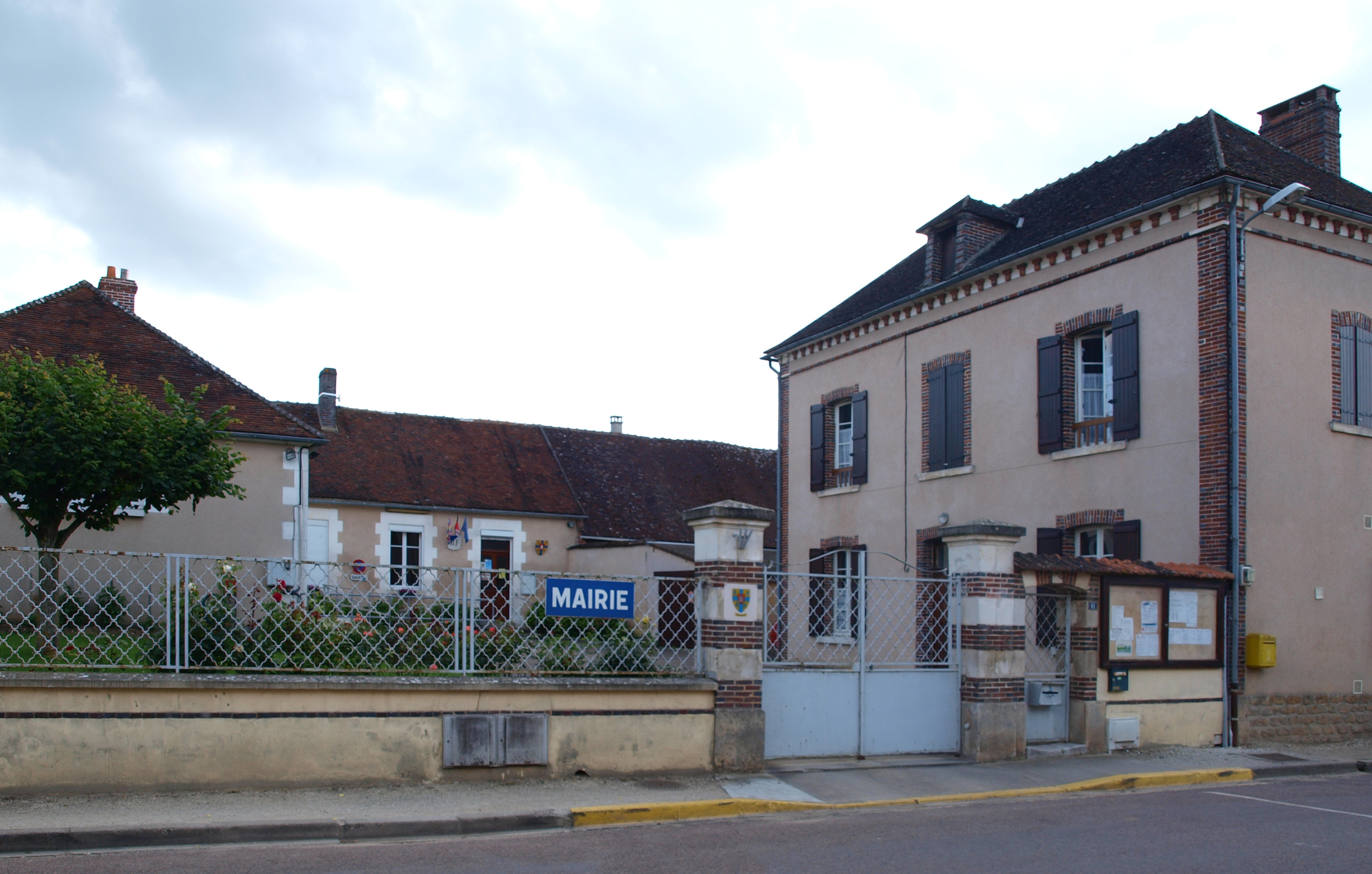
- The town hall in Champlay

- Coat of arms
- Location of Champlay
- Location within France Location within Bourgogne-Franche-Comté
- Coordinates: 47°57′06″N 3°26′32″E
- Country: France
- Region: Bourgogne-Franche-Comté
- Department: Yonne
- Arrondissement: Sens
- Canton: Joigny

Government
  - Mayor (2020–2026): Jean-Pierre Barret
- Area^{1}: 21.08 km^{2} (8.14 sq mi)
- Highest elevation: 223 m (732 ft)
- Lowest elevation: 77 m (253 ft)
- Population (2023): 733
  - Density: 34.8/km^{2} (90.1/sq mi)
- Time zone: UTC+01:00 (CET)
  - Summer (DST): UTC+02:00 (CEST)
- INSEE/Postal code: 89075 /89300
- ^{1} French Land Register data, which excludes lakes, ponds, glaciers > 1 km^{2} (0.386 sq mi or 247 acres) and river estuaries.

Champlay (French pronunciation: [ʃɑ̃plɛ]) is a commune in the Yonne department in Bourgogne-Franche-Comté in north-central France.

== See also ==
- Communes of the Yonne department
