= Fouchères =

Fouchères may refer to the following communes of France:

- Fouchères, Aube, in the Aube department
- Fouchères, Yonne, in the Yonne department
- Fouchères-aux-Bois, in the Meuse department
