= François II d'Allonville d'Oysonville =

François II d'Allonville d'Oysonville (born in 1529, Château d' Oysonville died in 1615) was a lord of Oysonville and Montacher-Villegardin, Knight of the Ordre du roi, deputy of the nobility to the Estates General from 1560 to Orléans, and to the Estates General of 1588–1589 at Blois. He played a role in the Italian wars under Henry II and he was one of the Catholic leaders (supporter of the League) during the Wars of Religion, before rallying to Henri IV.

== Biography ==
Vertron is a stronghold belonging to the Allonville family since the 11th century. Besides the hamlet of Vertron, it is made up of those of Les Entonnoirs, Les Brissets and Les Étangs, in the parish of Montacher. The d'Allonvilles collect 100 pounds on seigniorial rights, lease the woods, ponds and land. They also touch the tithes and the champarts. This land brought them 2,684 pounds every year until the Revolution. He was a Knight of the Ordre du Roy, like some of his ancestors. On 16 September 1570 King Charles IX of France gave a notice to Sieur d'Oysonville that the knights of his order were appointed into their company and informs him that he has sent Sieur de Clervaux the collar of the said order to present to him. Francis II played a fairly important role in the Italian wars, in particular the tenth (1552–1556) and the eleventh (1556–1559), under Henry II (1547–1559) and he is also known as one of the Catholic leaders during the Wars of Religion. He was deputy of the nobility of Étampes to the Estates General of 1560 in Orléans and to the Estates General of 1588–1589 in Blois. He was also a Gentleman of the King's Chamber. He had the honor of receiving Henri IV several times in his family's castle in Oysonville. François II d'Allonville was a governor of the town and duchy of Étampes.

François II d'Allonville and Jeanne de Billy are the uncle and aunt of Benjamin de Brichanteau, Bishop-Duke of Laon (1612–1619) and ecclesiastical peer of France and of Philibert de Brichanteau, Bishop-Duke of Laon (1620–1652 and peer ecclesiastic of France).

== Descendants ==
François II and Jeanne du Monceau had only one daughter, Gabrielle d'Allonville, dame du Monceau, de Saint-Cyr, de Fontainebleau, in part, land which she sold to Henri IV.

François and Jeanne de Billy have the following children

- Geoffroy d'Allonville d'Oysonville (1565–1599). Born at the Château d' Oysonville, he commanded a company of light horses and bore the title of Baron d'Oysonville. He put himself in the service of Emperor Rudolf II, and died in 1599 in a battle in Hungary, against the Ottoman Turks ^{[ref. to be confirmed] [ref. incomplete]} .
- Jacques d'Allonville d'Oysonville (born in 1568 )
- Claude d'Allonville d'Oysonville (1569–1602), born in the castle of Oysonville, was lord of Mauregard, He put himself in the service of Emperor Rudolph II, and died in 1602 in a battle in Hungary, against the Ottoman Turks. Certainly in June 1602 and during the victory of the Holy Empire which allowed it to annex Transylvania .
- Jeanne d'Allonville (1572–1636) indirectly succeeded her aunt, Marguerite de Billy, who died in 1596, as abbess of the abbey of Mont-Sainte-Catherine de Provins
- Claude d'Allonville (1573-?), Sieur de Mauregard on the death of his brother
- Étienne d'Allonville, Lord of Ezeaux, near Étampes .
- Pierre d'Allonville is Lord of Vertron.
- Louise d'Allonville d'Oysonville marries Jean Hurault de l'Hospital (1576–1636).
- Françoise d'Allonville marries Jacques Lenfant.
- Odette d'Allonville, nun at Pont-Sainte-Maxence .
- Anne d'Allonville (1580–1645), abbess of the Cordelières at Mont Sainte-Catherine les Provins, on the death of her sister, Jeanne d'Allonville, in 1636 .
