= Domat =

Domat may refer to:

- Domat/Ems, a municipality of the canton of Graubünden, Switzerland
- Jean Domat
- Domat (olive), a Turkish olive see Olive#Cultivars
- Domatic number
- Domats is a commune of the Yonne département, in France
