= Alcide Delmont =

French lawyer and politician

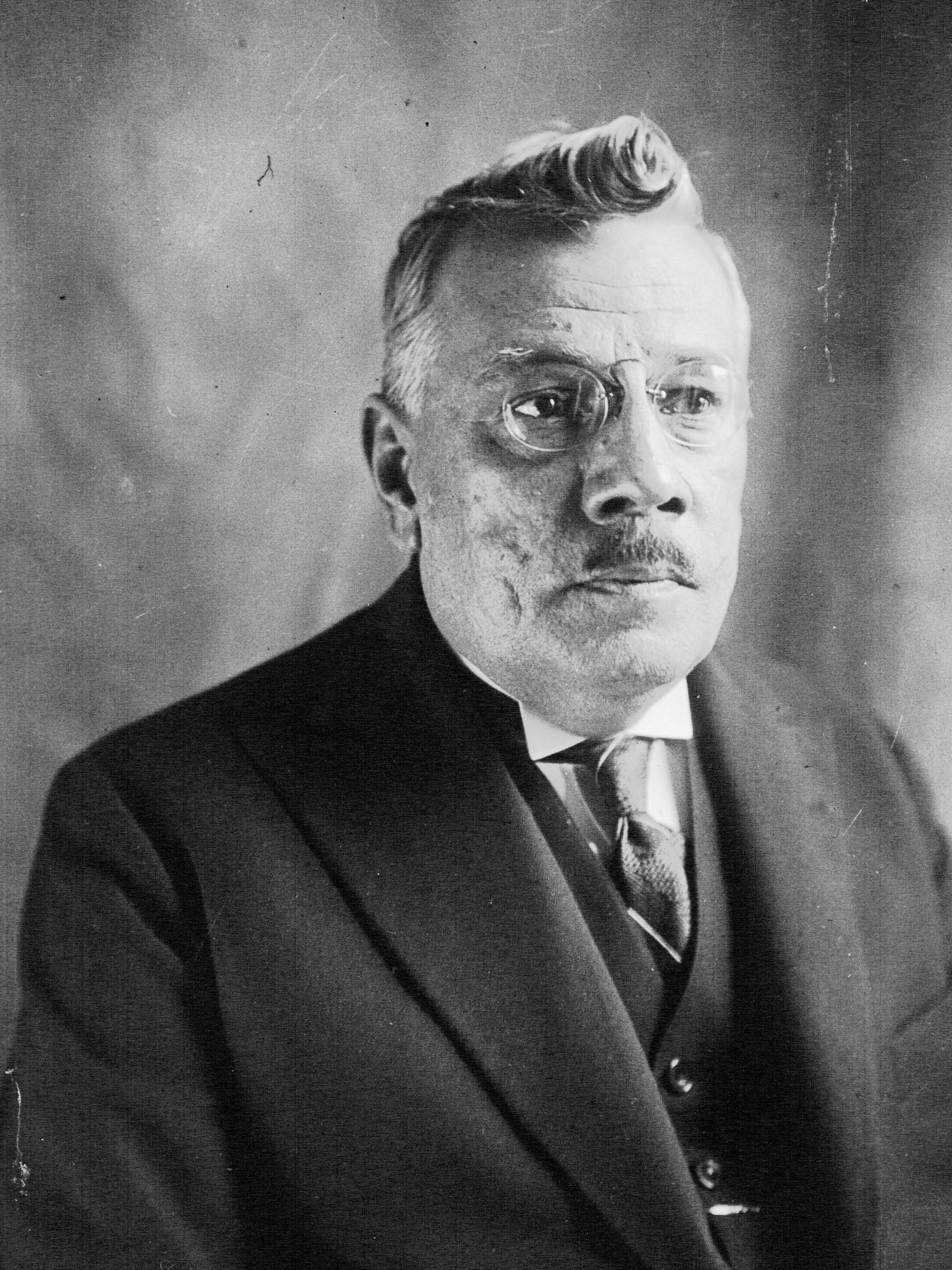
- Delmont in 1933

Deputy of the National Assembly
- In office 1936–1924
- Constituency: Martinique

Personal details
- Born: October 2, 1874 Saint-Pierre, Martinique
- Died: October 14, 1959 (aged 85) Brannay (Yonne)
- Party: PRS 1924-1928; Independents of the Left, 1928-1936

Alcide Delmont (2 October 1874 – 14 October 1959) was a French lawyer and politician from Martinique.

== Biography ==
With a doctorate in law, Alcide Delmont was admitted to the Paris Bar on 11 February 1904 as a lawyer. Secretary of the conference of the training course for lawyers at the Paris Court of Appeal in Pierre Massé's class (1906-1907), he had a dual career in politics and the judiciary for almost 50 years. He was also a member of the central committee of the Human Rights League (France).

From 1924 to 1936 he was a deputy for Martinique as a socialist republican and then as a left-wing independent.

He was Under-Secretary of State for the Colonies from 3 November 1929 to 17 February 1930 and from 2 March to 30 December 1930, in the first and second André Tardieu governments. Alcide Delmont was the second Martiniquan in history after Henri Lémery to be a member of a French cabinet.
