= Vernoy =

Vernoy may refer to:

- Vernoy, Yonne, France
- Vernoy, New Jersey, USA
