= Lixy =

- Commune
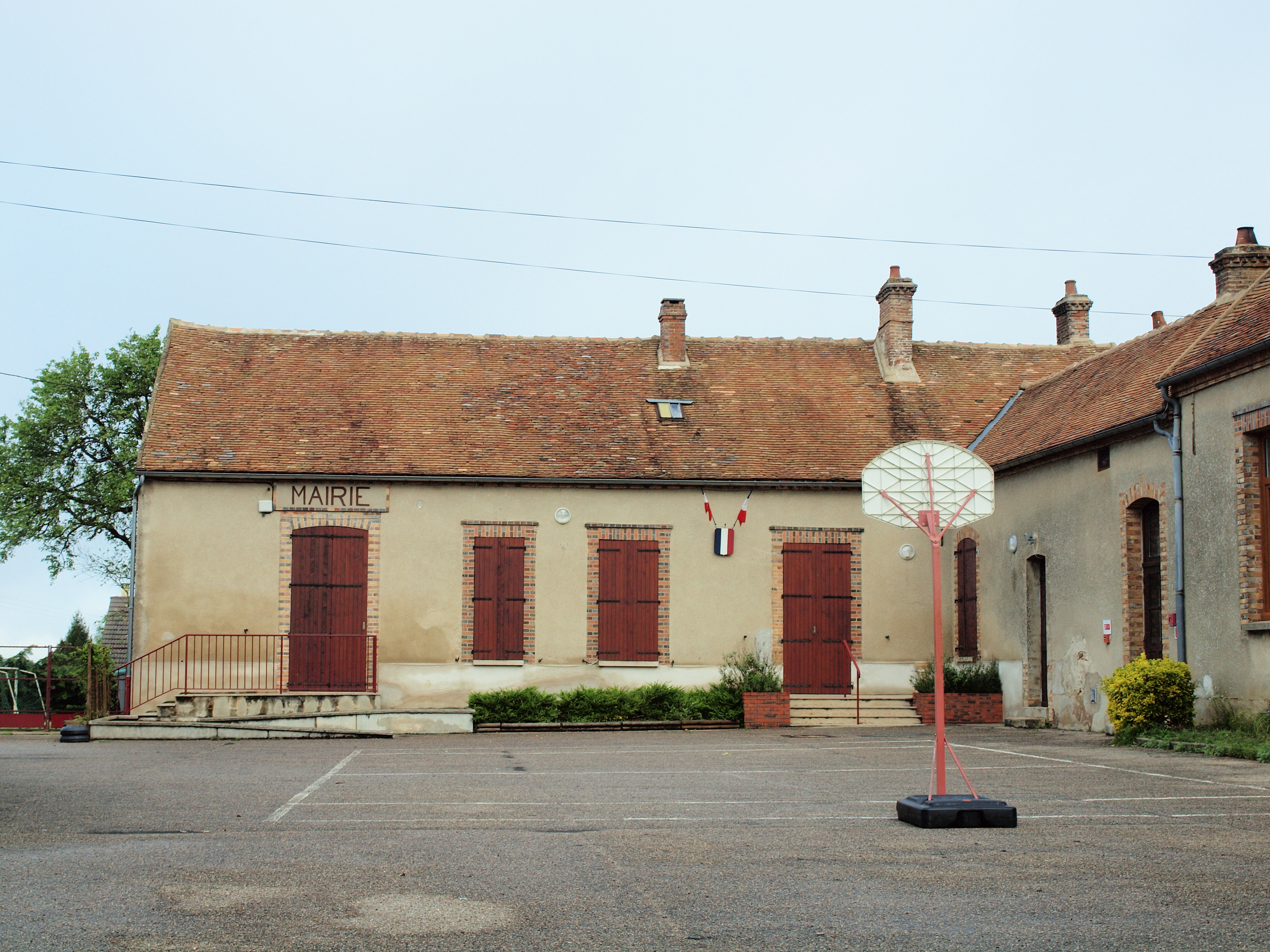
- The town hall in Lixy

- Coat of arms
- Location of Lixy
- Location within France Location within Bourgogne-Franche-Comté
- Coordinates: 48°14′20″N 3°05′52″E
- Country: France
- Region: Bourgogne-Franche-Comté
- Department: Yonne
- Arrondissement: Sens
- Canton: Gâtinais en Bourgogne

Government
  - Mayor (2020–2026): Étienne Séguelas
- Area^{1}: 12.02 km^{2} (4.64 sq mi)
- Highest elevation: 191 m (627 ft)
- Lowest elevation: 127 m (417 ft)
- Population (2023): 480
  - Density: 40/km^{2} (100/sq mi)
- Time zone: UTC+01:00 (CET)
  - Summer (DST): UTC+02:00 (CEST)
- INSEE/Postal code: 89229 /89140
- ^{1} French Land Register data, which excludes lakes, ponds, glaciers > 1 km^{2} (0.386 sq mi or 247 acres) and river estuaries.

Lixy (French pronunciation: [liksi]) is a commune in the Yonne department in Bourgogne-Franche-Comté in north-central France.

== See also ==
- Communes of the Yonne department
