= Villethierry =

- Commune
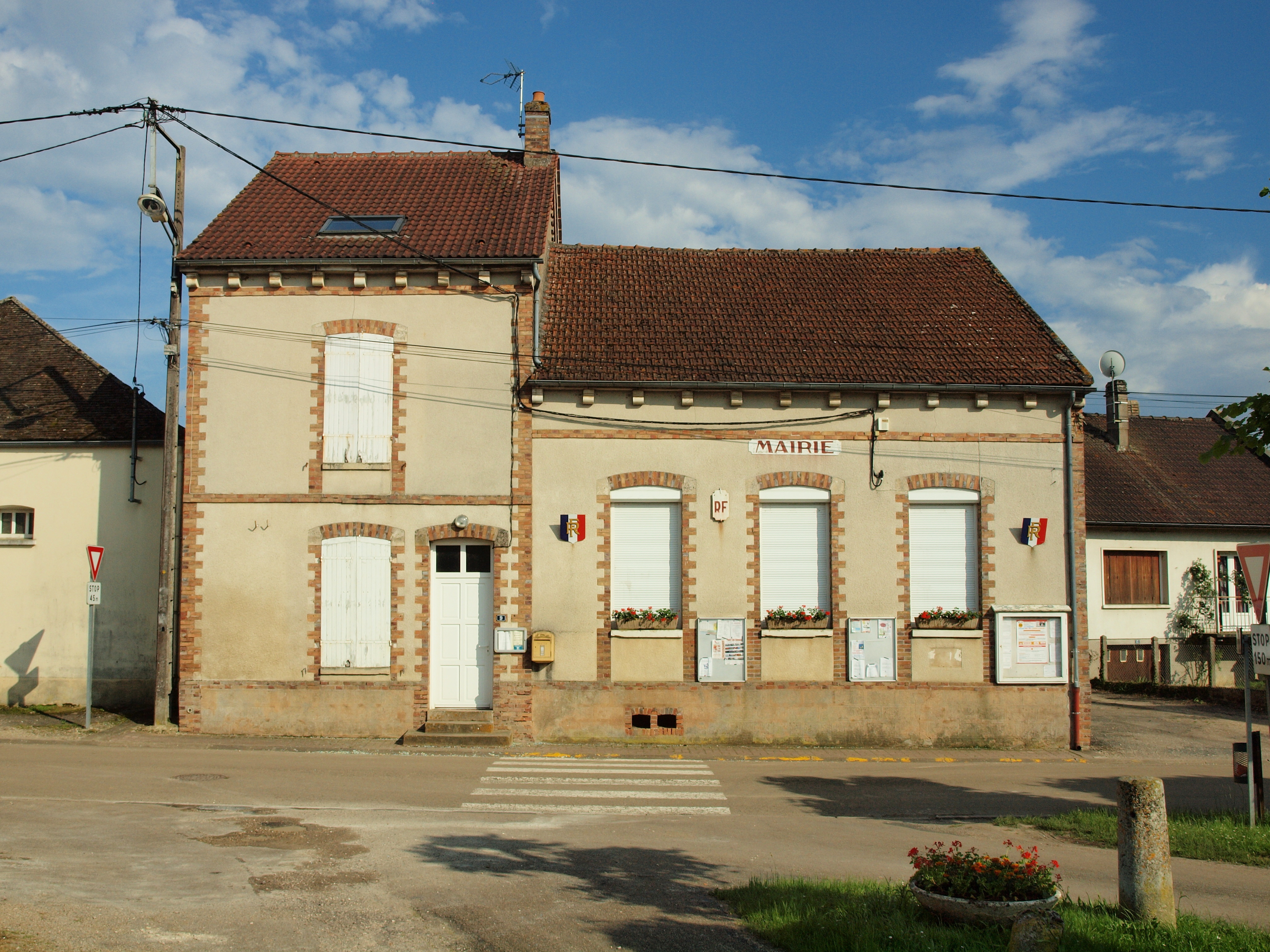
- The town hall in Villethierry
- Location of Villethierry
- Location within France Location within Bourgogne-Franche-Comté
- Coordinates: 48°15′52″N 3°04′28″E
- Country: France
- Region: Bourgogne-Franche-Comté
- Department: Yonne
- Arrondissement: Sens
- Canton: Gâtinais en Bourgogne

Government
  - Mayor (2020–2026): Corinne Pasquier
- Area^{1}: 20.88 km^{2} (8.06 sq mi)
- Highest elevation: 183 m (600 ft)
- Lowest elevation: 108 m (354 ft)
- Population (2023): 789
  - Density: 37.8/km^{2} (97.9/sq mi)
- Time zone: UTC+01:00 (CET)
  - Summer (DST): UTC+02:00 (CEST)
- INSEE/Postal code: 89467 /89140
- ^{1} French Land Register data, which excludes lakes, ponds, glaciers > 1 km^{2} (0.386 sq mi or 247 acres) and river estuaries.

Villethierry (French pronunciation: [viltjɛʁi]) is a commune in the Yonne department in Bourgogne-Franche-Comté in north-central France.

== See also ==
- Communes of the Yonne department
