= Saint-Agnan, Yonne =

Saint-Agnan
- Commune
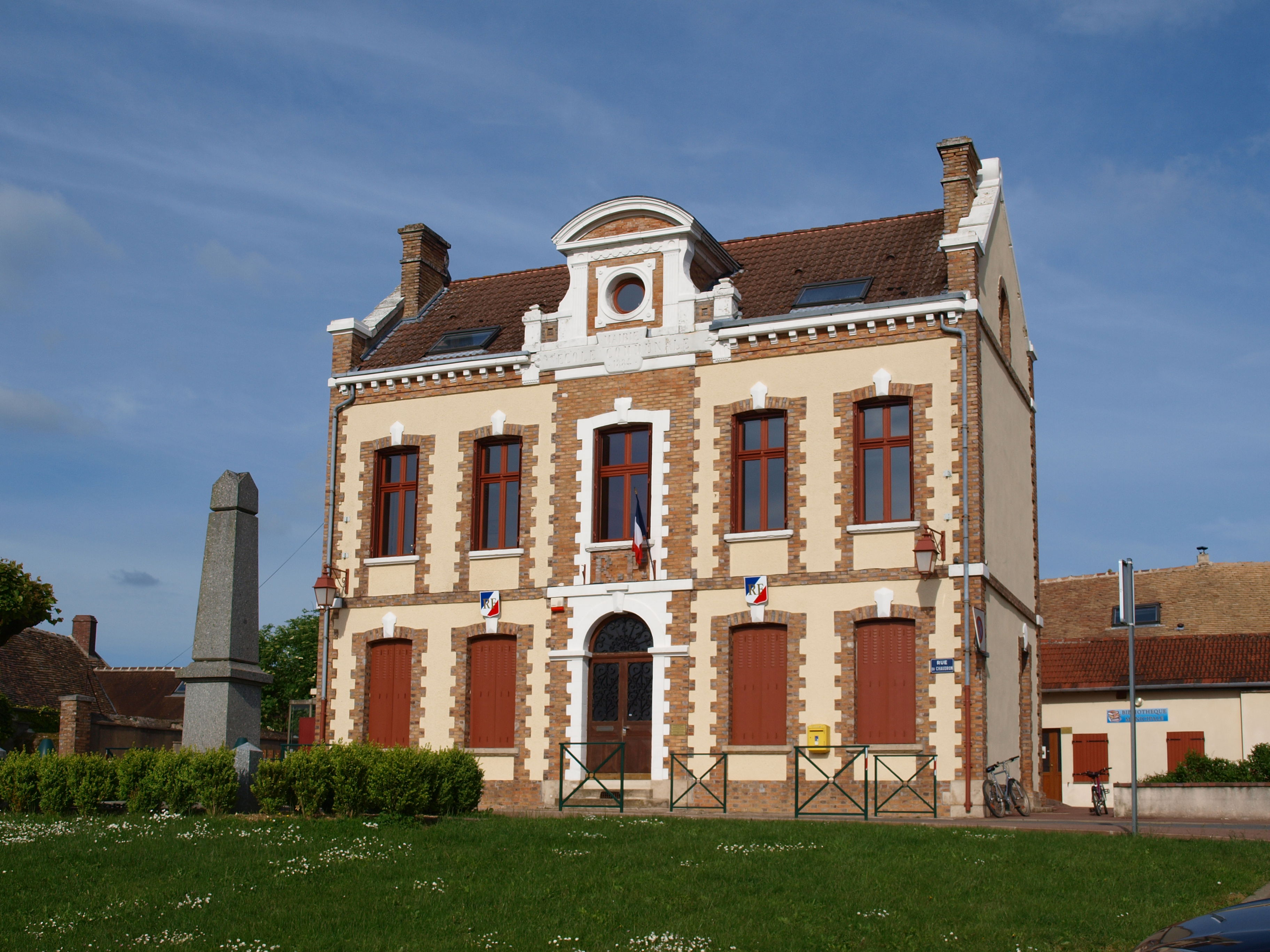
- The town hall in Saint-Agnan

- Coat of arms
- Location of Saint-Agnan
- Location within France Location within Bourgogne-Franche-Comté
- Coordinates: 48°18′23″N 3°03′07″E
- Country: France
- Region: Bourgogne-Franche-Comté
- Department: Yonne
- Arrondissement: Sens
- Canton: Gâtinais en Bourgogne

Government
  - Mayor (2020–2026): Bruno Chemin
- Area^{1}: 13.22 km^{2} (5.10 sq mi)
- Highest elevation: 168 m (551 ft)
- Lowest elevation: 88 m (289 ft)
- Population (2023): 913
  - Density: 69.1/km^{2} (179/sq mi)
- Time zone: UTC+01:00 (CET)
  - Summer (DST): UTC+02:00 (CEST)
- INSEE/Postal code: 89332 /89340
- ^{1} French Land Register data, which excludes lakes, ponds, glaciers > 1 km^{2} (0.386 sq mi or 247 acres) and river estuaries.

Saint-Agnan (French pronunciation: [sɛ̃.t‿aɲɑ̃]) is a commune in the Yonne department in Bourgogne-Franche-Comté in north-central France.

== See also ==
- Communes of the Yonne department
