= Cornant =

- Commune
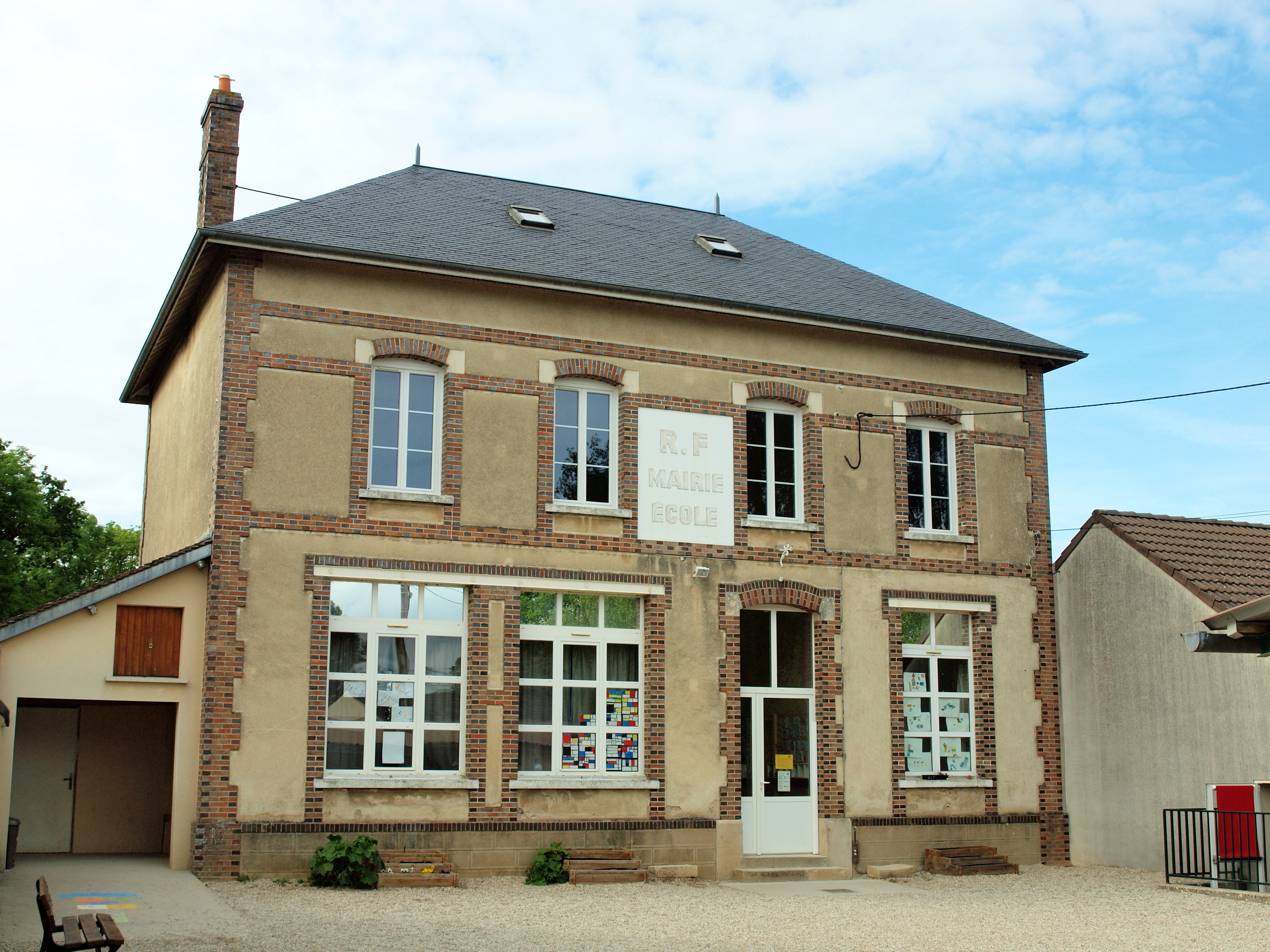
- The town hall and school in Cornant
- Location of Cornant
- Location within France Location within Bourgogne-Franche-Comté
- Coordinates: 48°08′00″N 3°11′11″E
- Country: France
- Region: Bourgogne-Franche-Comté
- Department: Yonne
- Arrondissement: Sens
- Canton: Gâtinais en Bourgogne

Government
  - Mayor (2020–2026): Monique Jarry
- Area^{1}: 5.06 km^{2} (1.95 sq mi)
- Highest elevation: 197 m (646 ft)
- Lowest elevation: 125 m (410 ft)
- Population (2023): 367
  - Density: 72.5/km^{2} (188/sq mi)
- Time zone: UTC+01:00 (CET)
  - Summer (DST): UTC+02:00 (CEST)
- INSEE/Postal code: 89116 /89500
- ^{1} French Land Register data, which excludes lakes, ponds, glaciers > 1 km^{2} (0.386 sq mi or 247 acres) and river estuaries.

Cornant (French pronunciation: [kɔʁnɑ̃]) is a commune in the Yonne department in Bourgogne-Franche-Comté in north-central France.

== See also ==
- Communes of the Yonne department
