= Villeneuve-la-Dondagre =

- Commune
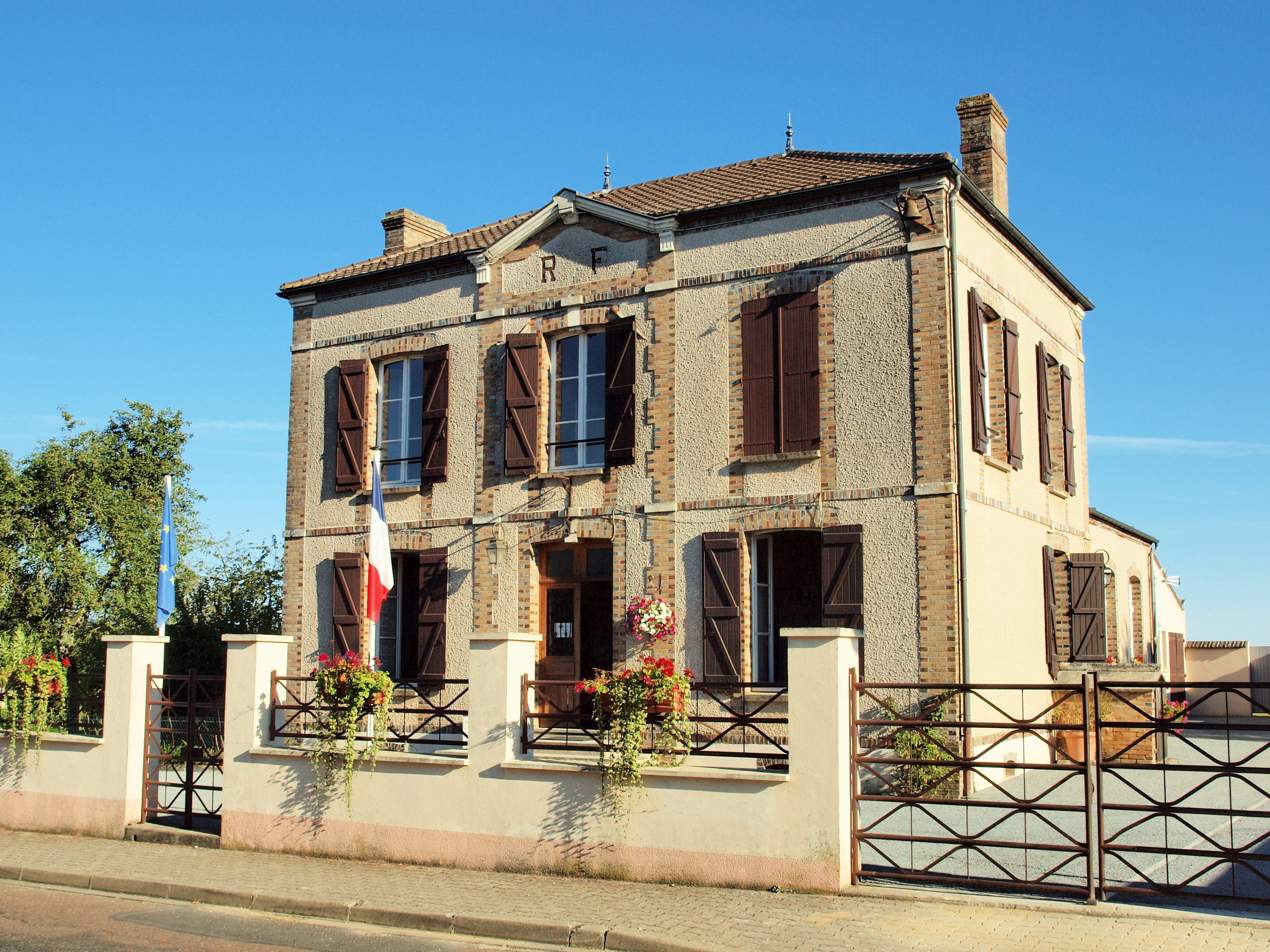
- The town hall in Villeneuve-la-Dondagre
- Location of Villeneuve-la-Dondagre
- Location within France Location within Bourgogne-Franche-Comté
- Coordinates: 48°08′20″N 3°08′12″E
- Country: France
- Region: Bourgogne-Franche-Comté
- Department: Yonne
- Arrondissement: Sens
- Canton: Gâtinais en Bourgogne

Government
  - Mayor (2020–2026): Jean-François Alliot
- Area^{1}: 14.55 km^{2} (5.62 sq mi)
- Highest elevation: 201 m (659 ft)
- Lowest elevation: 161 m (528 ft)
- Population (2023): 334
  - Density: 23.0/km^{2} (59.5/sq mi)
- Time zone: UTC+01:00 (CET)
  - Summer (DST): UTC+02:00 (CEST)
- INSEE/Postal code: 89459 /89150
- ^{1} French Land Register data, which excludes lakes, ponds, glaciers > 1 km^{2} (0.386 sq mi or 247 acres) and river estuaries.

Villeneuve-la-Dondagre (French pronunciation: [vilnœv la dɔ̃daɡʁ]) is a commune in the Yonne department in Bourgogne-Franche-Comté in north-central France.

== See also ==
- Communes of the Yonne department
