= Subligny, Yonne =

Subligny
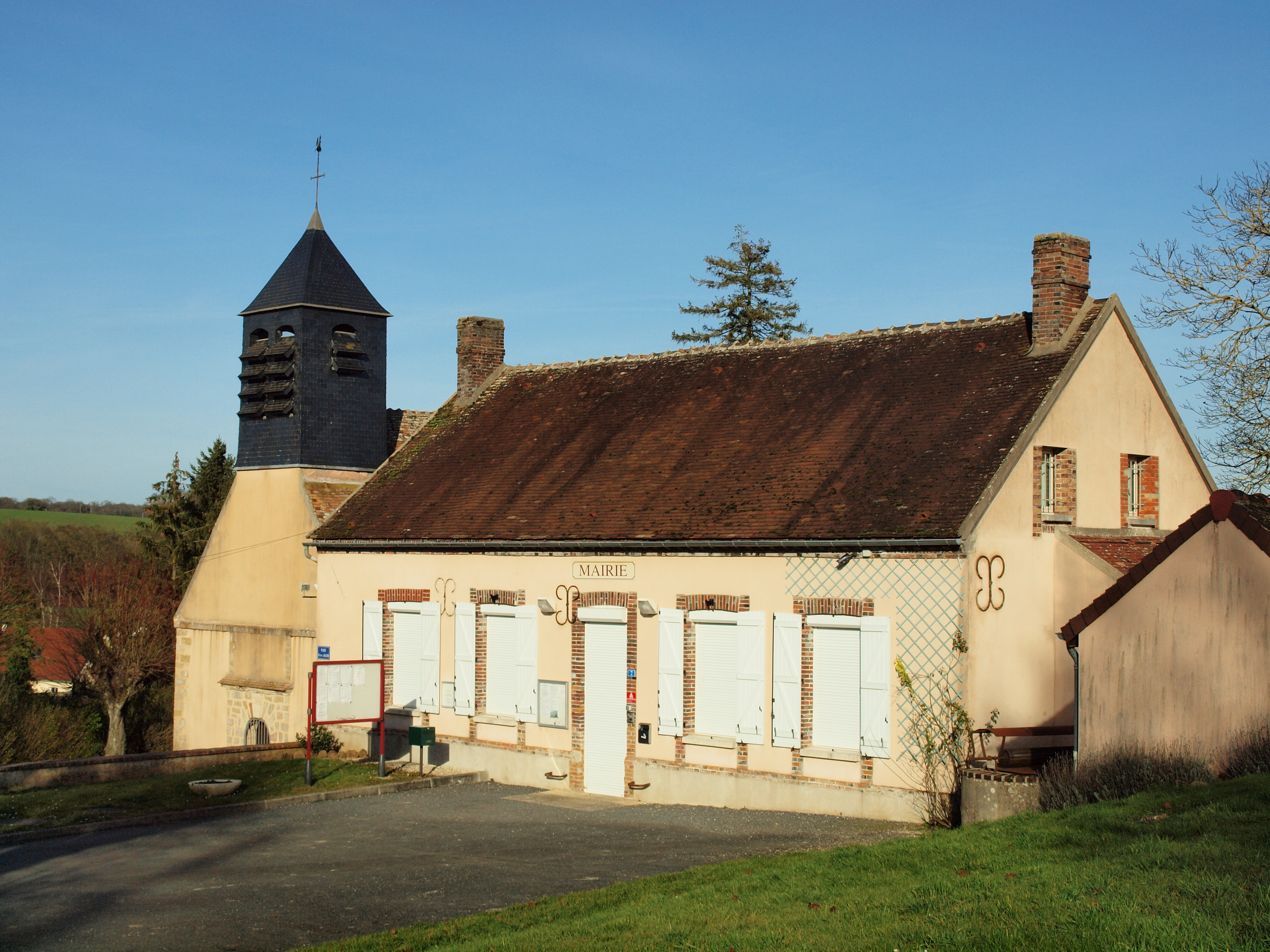
- The town hall in Subligny

- Coat of arms
- Location of Subligny
- Location within France Location within Bourgogne-Franche-Comté
- Coordinates: 48°10′03″N 3°12′15″E
- Country: France
- Region: Bourgogne-Franche-Comté
- Department: Yonne
- Arrondissement: Sens
- Canton: Gâtinais en Bourgogne
- Intercommunality: CC du Gâtinais en Bourgogne

Government
  - Mayor (2020–2026): Gilbert Gremy
- Area^{1}: 7.88 km^{2} (3.04 sq mi)
- Highest elevation: 201 m (659 ft)
- Lowest elevation: 110 m (360 ft)
- Population (2023): 508
  - Density: 64.5/km^{2} (167/sq mi)
- Time zone: UTC+01:00 (CET)
  - Summer (DST): UTC+02:00 (CEST)
- INSEE/Postal code: 89404 /89100
- ^{1} French Land Register data, which excludes lakes, ponds, glaciers > 1 km^{2} (0.386 sq mi or 247 acres) and river estuaries.

Subligny (French pronunciation: [sybliɲi]) is a commune in the Yonne department in Bourgogne-Franche-Comté in north-central France.

== See also ==
- Communes of the Yonne department
