= Dollot =

- Commune
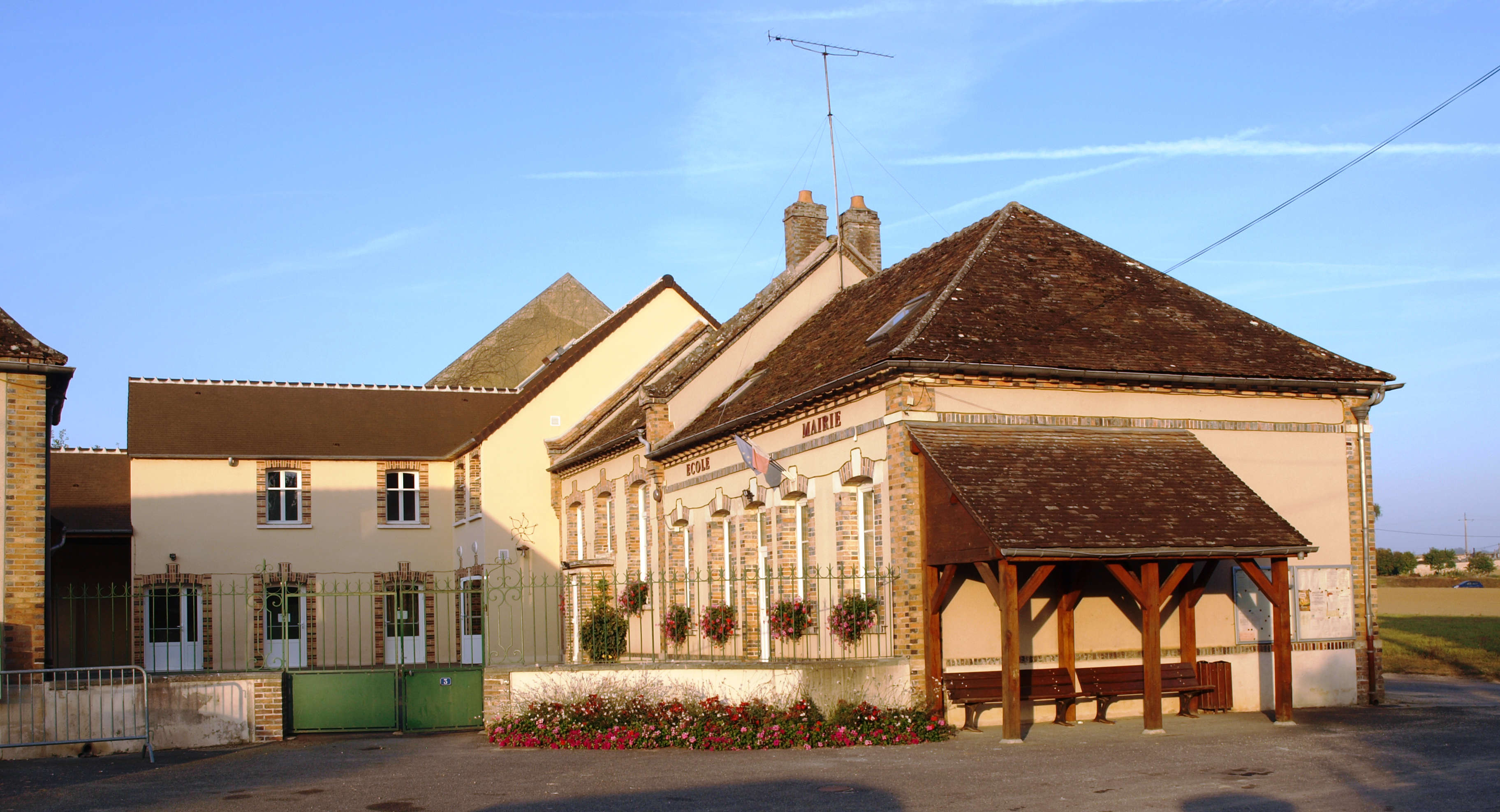
- The town hall and school in Dollot
- Location of Dollot
- Location within France Location within Bourgogne-Franche-Comté
- Coordinates: 48°12′44″N 3°04′24″E
- Country: France
- Region: Bourgogne-Franche-Comté
- Department: Yonne
- Arrondissement: Sens
- Canton: Gâtinais en Bourgogne

Government
  - Mayor (2020–2026): Jean-Jacques Noel
- Area^{1}: 15.28 km^{2} (5.90 sq mi)
- Highest elevation: 169 m (554 ft)
- Lowest elevation: 122 m (400 ft)
- Population (2023): 327
  - Density: 21.4/km^{2} (55.4/sq mi)
- Time zone: UTC+01:00 (CET)
  - Summer (DST): UTC+02:00 (CEST)
- INSEE/Postal code: 89143 /89150
- ^{1} French Land Register data, which excludes lakes, ponds, glaciers > 1 km^{2} (0.386 sq mi or 247 acres) and river estuaries.

Dollot (French pronunciation: [dɔlo]) is a commune in the Yonne department in Bourgogne-Franche-Comté in north-central France.

== See also ==
- Communes of the Yonne department
