= Nailly =

- Commune
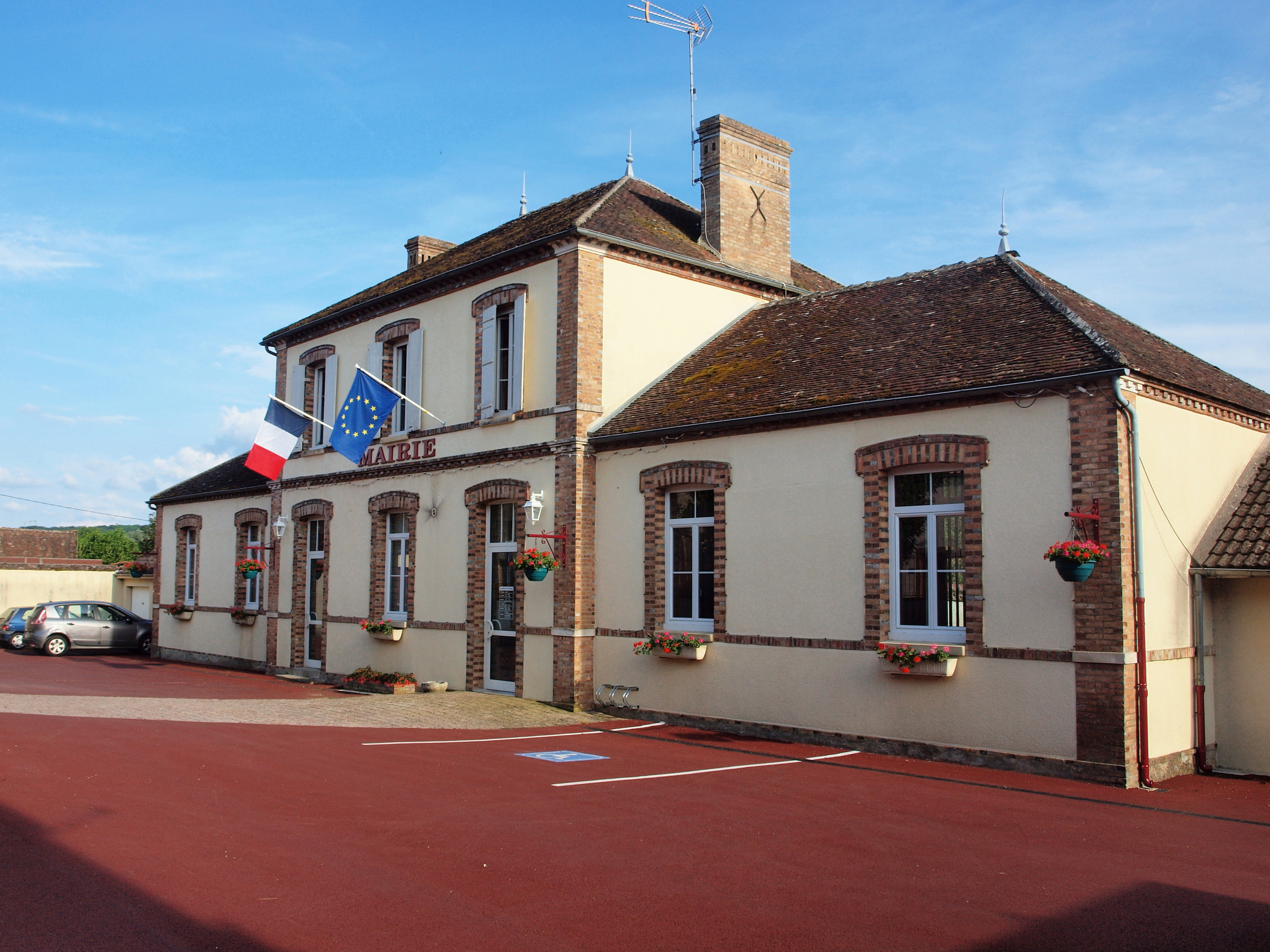
- The town hall in Nailly

- Coat of arms
- Location of Nailly
- Location within France Location within Bourgogne-Franche-Comté
- Coordinates: 48°13′28″N 3°13′26″E
- Country: France
- Region: Bourgogne-Franche-Comté
- Department: Yonne
- Arrondissement: Sens
- Canton: Gâtinais en Bourgogne
- Intercommunality: Gâtinais en Bourgogne

Government
  - Mayor (2020–2026): Florence Bardot
- Area^{1}: 21.61 km^{2} (8.34 sq mi)
- Highest elevation: 191 m (627 ft)
- Lowest elevation: 74 m (243 ft)
- Population (2023): 1,283
  - Density: 59.37/km^{2} (153.8/sq mi)
- Time zone: UTC+01:00 (CET)
  - Summer (DST): UTC+02:00 (CEST)
- INSEE/Postal code: 89274 /89100
- ^{1} French Land Register data, which excludes lakes, ponds, glaciers > 1 km^{2} (0.386 sq mi or 247 acres) and river estuaries.

Nailly (French pronunciation: [naji]) is a commune in the Yonne department in Bourgogne-Franche-Comté in north-central France.

== Population ==
Historical population
| Year | Pop. | ±% p.a. |
|---|---|---|
| 1968 | 527 | — |
| 1975 | 579 | +1.35% |
| 1982 | 761 | +3.98% |
| 1990 | 1,008 | +3.58% |
| 1999 | 1,107 | +1.05% |
| 2007 | 1,179 | +0.79% |
| 2012 | 1,264 | +1.40% |
| 2017 | 1,299 | +0.55% |
| 2023 | 1,283 | −0.21% |
Source: INSEE

== See also ==
- Communes of the Yonne department
