= Jouy, Yonne =

Jouy
- Commune
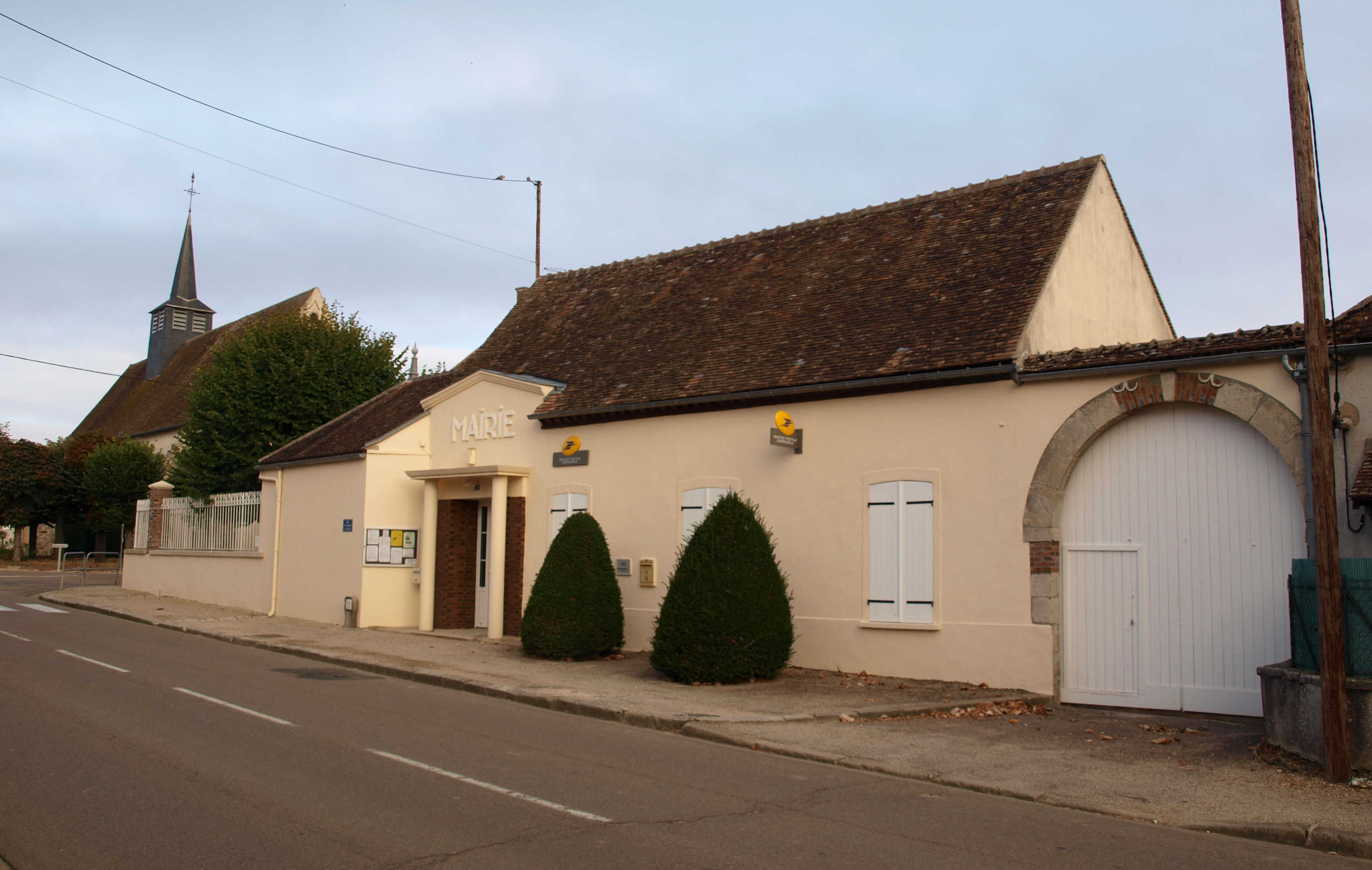
- The town hall and church in Jouy
- Location of Jouy
- Location within France Location within Bourgogne-Franche-Comté
- Coordinates: 48°10′04″N 2°58′30″E
- Country: France
- Region: Bourgogne-Franche-Comté
- Department: Yonne
- Arrondissement: Sens
- Canton: Gâtinais en Bourgogne
- Intercommunality: Gâtinais en Bourgogne

Government
  - Mayor (2020–2026): Nadia Leituga
- Area^{1}: 17.60 km^{2} (6.80 sq mi)
- Elevation: 150 m (490 ft)
- Highest elevation: 151 m (495 ft)
- Lowest elevation: 128 m (420 ft)
- Population (2023): 510
  - Density: 29/km^{2} (75/sq mi)
- Time zone: UTC+01:00 (CET)
  - Summer (DST): UTC+02:00 (CEST)
- INSEE/Postal code: 89209 /89150
- ^{1} French Land Register data, which excludes lakes, ponds, glaciers > 1 km^{2} (0.386 sq mi or 247 acres) and river estuaries.

Jouy (French pronunciation: [ʒwi]) is a commune in the Yonne department in Bourgogne-Franche-Comté in north-central France.

== See also ==
- Communes of the Yonne department
