= Villebougis =

- Commune
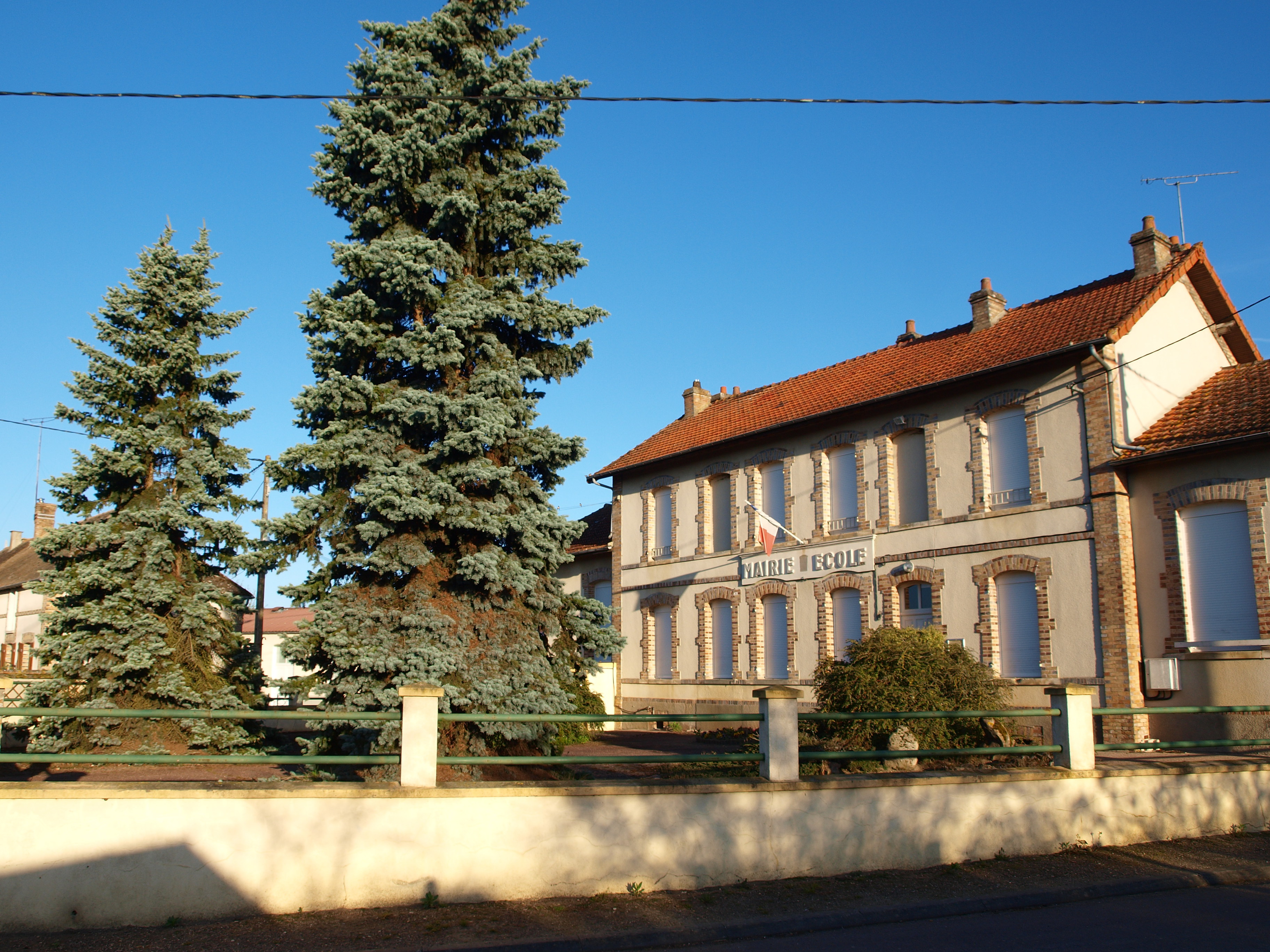
- The town hall in Villebougis
- Location of Villebougis
- Location within France Location within Bourgogne-Franche-Comté
- Coordinates: 48°12′18″N 3°09′38″E
- Country: France
- Region: Bourgogne-Franche-Comté
- Department: Yonne
- Arrondissement: Sens
- Canton: Gâtinais en Bourgogne
- Area^{1}: 11.81 km^{2} (4.56 sq mi)
- Highest elevation: 185 m (607 ft)
- Lowest elevation: 128 m (420 ft)
- Population (2023): 632
  - Density: 53.5/km^{2} (139/sq mi)
- Time zone: UTC+01:00 (CET)
  - Summer (DST): UTC+02:00 (CEST)
- INSEE/Postal code: 89450 /89150
- ^{1} French Land Register data, which excludes lakes, ponds, glaciers > 1 km^{2} (0.386 sq mi or 247 acres) and river estuaries.

Villebougis is a commune in the Yonne department in Bourgogne-Franche-Comté in north-central France.

== See also ==
- Communes of the Yonne department
