= Canton of Gâtinais en Bourgogne =

Coordinates: 48.18°N 3.10°E

The canton of Gâtinais en Bourgogne is an administrative division of the Yonne department, central France. It was created at the French canton reorganisation which came into effect in March 2015. Its seat is in Saint-Valérien.

It consists of the following communes:

1. La Belliole
2. Brannay
3. Chéroy
4. Collemiers
5. Cornant
6. Courtoin
7. Dollot
8. Domats
9. Égriselles-le-Bocage
10. Fouchères
11. Jouy
12. Lixy
13. Montacher-Villegardin
14. Nailly
15. Saint-Agnan
16. Saint-Valérien
17. Savigny-sur-Clairis
18. Subligny
19. Vallery
20. Vernoy
21. Villebougis
22. Villeneuve-la-Dondagre
23. Villeroy
24. Villethierry
