= Collemiers =

- Commune
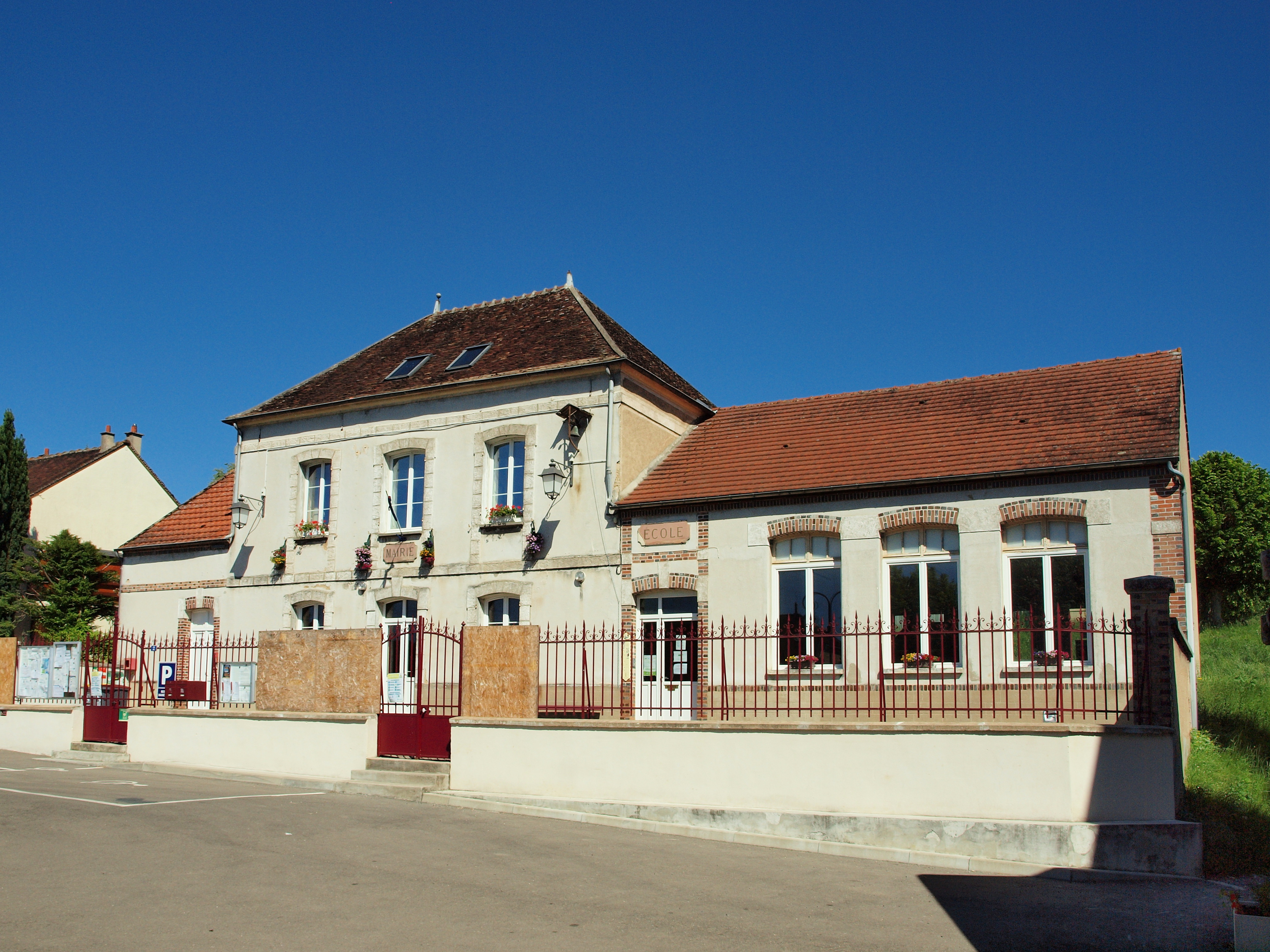
- The town hall in Collemiers
- Location of Collemiers
- Location within France Location within Bourgogne-Franche-Comté
- Coordinates: 48°09′26″N 3°14′03″E
- Country: France
- Region: Bourgogne-Franche-Comté
- Department: Yonne
- Arrondissement: Sens
- Canton: Gâtinais en Bourgogne
- Intercommunality: CA Grand Sénonais

Government
  - Mayor (2020–2026): Simone Mangeon
- Area^{1}: 10.70 km^{2} (4.13 sq mi)
- Highest elevation: 194 m (636 ft)
- Lowest elevation: 93 m (305 ft)
- Population (2023): 663
  - Density: 62.0/km^{2} (160/sq mi)
- Time zone: UTC+01:00 (CET)
  - Summer (DST): UTC+02:00 (CEST)
- INSEE/Postal code: 89113 /89100
- ^{1} French Land Register data, which excludes lakes, ponds, glaciers > 1 km^{2} (0.386 sq mi or 247 acres) and river estuaries.

Collemiers (French pronunciation: [kɔlmje]) is a commune in the Yonne department in Bourgogne-Franche-Comté in north-central France.

== See also ==
- Communes of the Yonne department
