= Oysonville =

- Commune
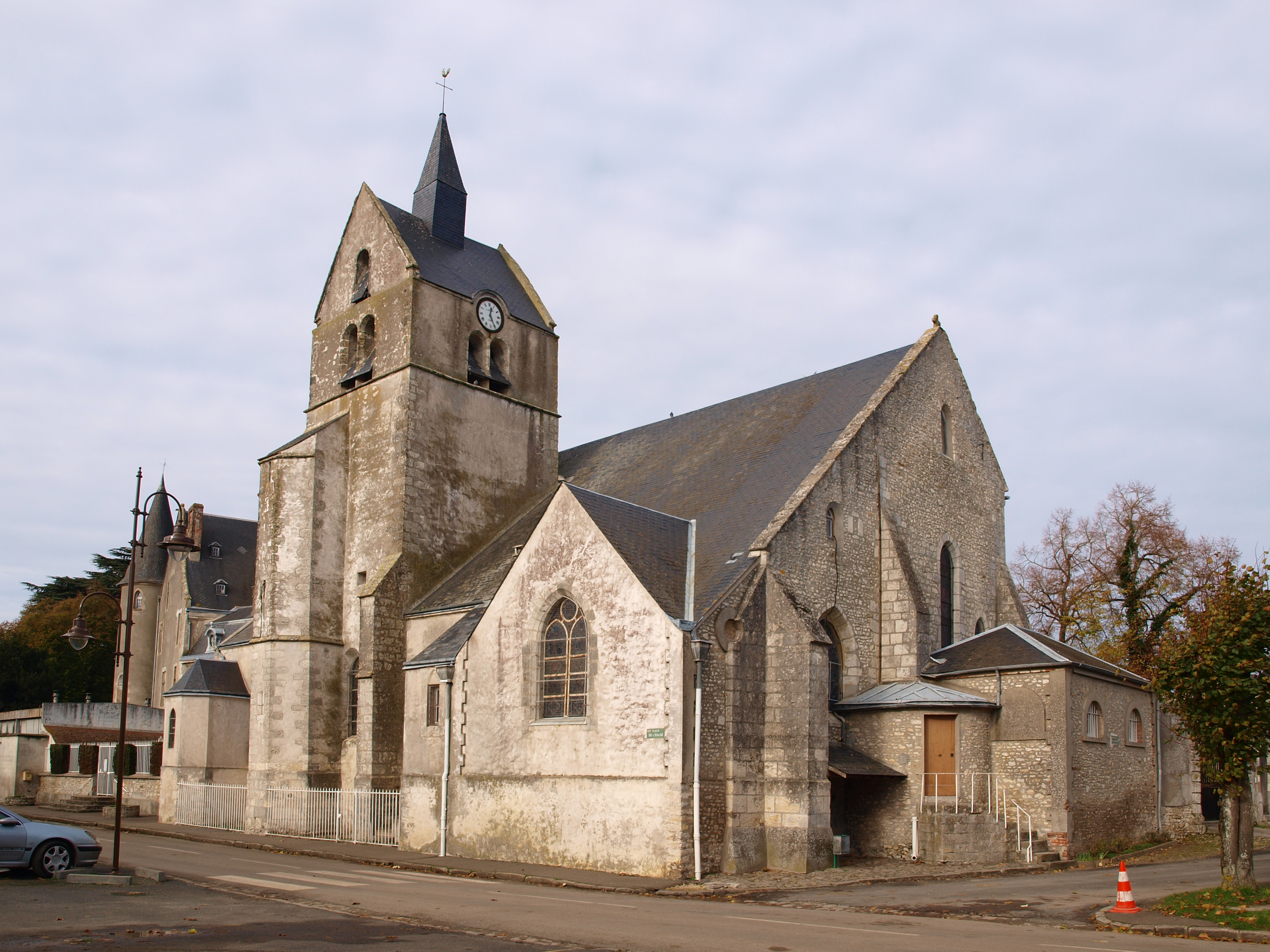
- The church in Oysonville

- Coat of arms
- Location of Oysonville
- Location within France Location within Centre-Val de Loire
- Coordinates: 48°23′38″N 1°57′22″E
- Country: France
- Region: Centre-Val de Loire
- Department: Eure-et-Loir
- Arrondissement: Chartres
- Canton: Auneau

Government
  - Mayor (2020–2026): Florence Héron
- Area^{1}: 9.6 km^{2} (3.7 sq mi)
- Highest elevation: 154 m (505 ft)
- Lowest elevation: 143 m (469 ft)
- Population (2023): 517
  - Density: 54/km^{2} (140/sq mi)
- Time zone: UTC+01:00 (CET)
  - Summer (DST): UTC+02:00 (CEST)
- INSEE/Postal code: 28294 /28700
- ^{1} French Land Register data, which excludes lakes, ponds, glaciers > 1 km^{2} (0.386 sq mi or 247 acres) and river estuaries.

Oysonville (French pronunciation: [wazɔ̃vil]) is a commune in the Eure-et-Loir department in northern France.

== Population ==
Historical population
Year	Pop.	±% p.a.
1968	318	—
1975	325	+0.31%
1982	441	+4.46%
1990	485	+1.20%
1999	471	−0.32%
2007	490	+0.50%
2012	505	+0.60%
2017	525	+0.78%
2023	517	−0.26%
Source: INSEE

== See also ==
- Communes of the Eure-et-Loir department
- François II d'Allonville d'Oysonville
