= Vernoy, Yonne =

Vernoy
- Commune
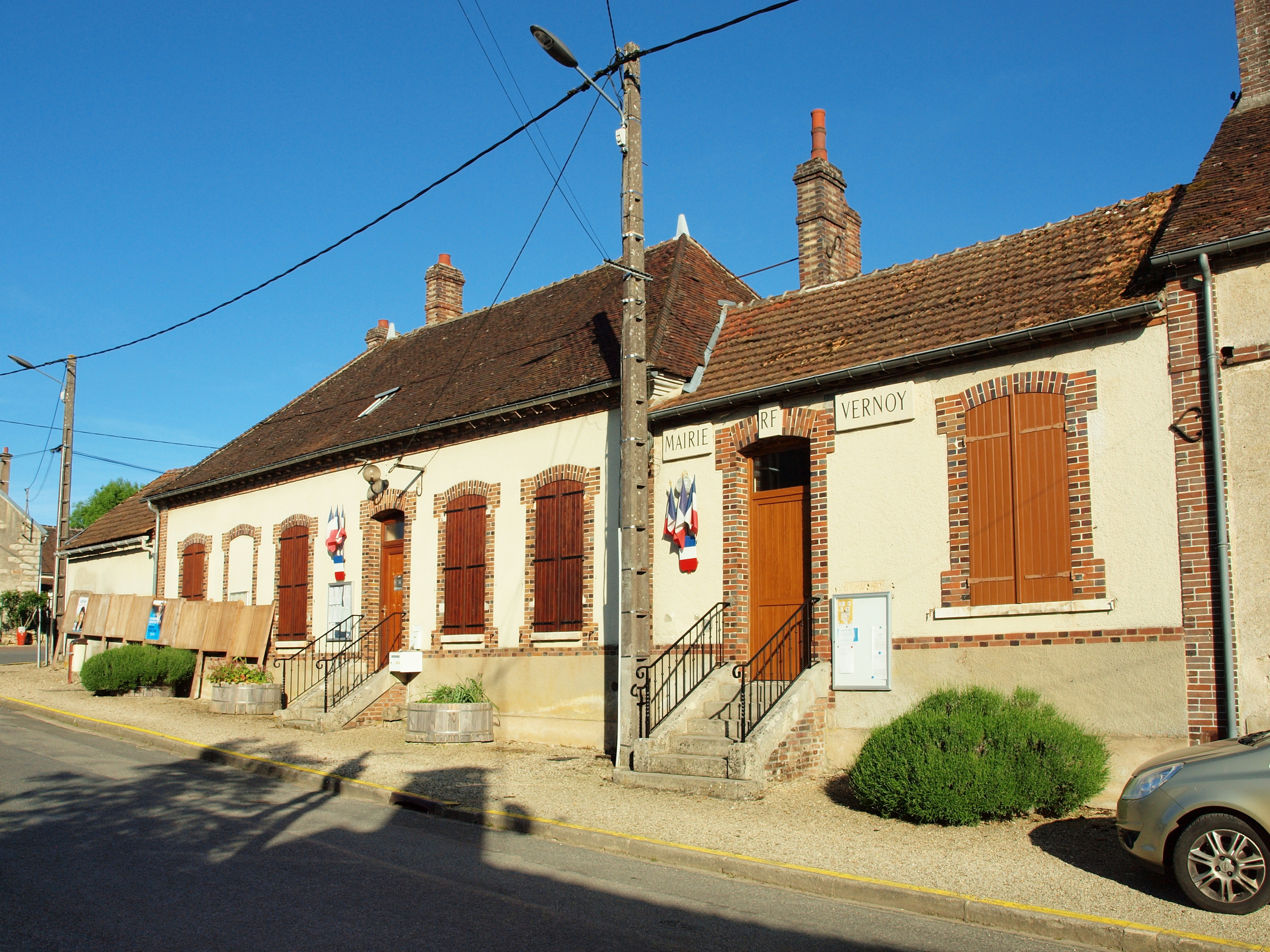
- The town hall in Vernoy

- Coat of arms
- Location of Vernoy
- Location within France Location within Bourgogne-Franche-Comté
- Coordinates: 48°05′46″N 3°07′33″E
- Country: France
- Region: Bourgogne-Franche-Comté
- Department: Yonne
- Arrondissement: Sens
- Canton: Gâtinais en Bourgogne

Government
  - Mayor (2020–2026): Frédéric Bourgeois
- Area^{1}: 14.42 km^{2} (5.57 sq mi)
- Highest elevation: 196 m (643 ft)
- Lowest elevation: 169 m (554 ft)
- Population (2023): 244
  - Density: 16.9/km^{2} (43.8/sq mi)
- Time zone: UTC+01:00 (CET)
  - Summer (DST): UTC+02:00 (CEST)
- INSEE/Postal code: 89442 /89150
- ^{1} French Land Register data, which excludes lakes, ponds, glaciers > 1 km^{2} (0.386 sq mi or 247 acres) and river estuaries.

Vernoy (French pronunciation: [vɛʁnwa]) is a commune in the Yonne department in Bourgogne-Franche-Comté in north-central France.

== See also ==
- Communes of the Yonne department
