= Montacher-Villegardin =

- Commune
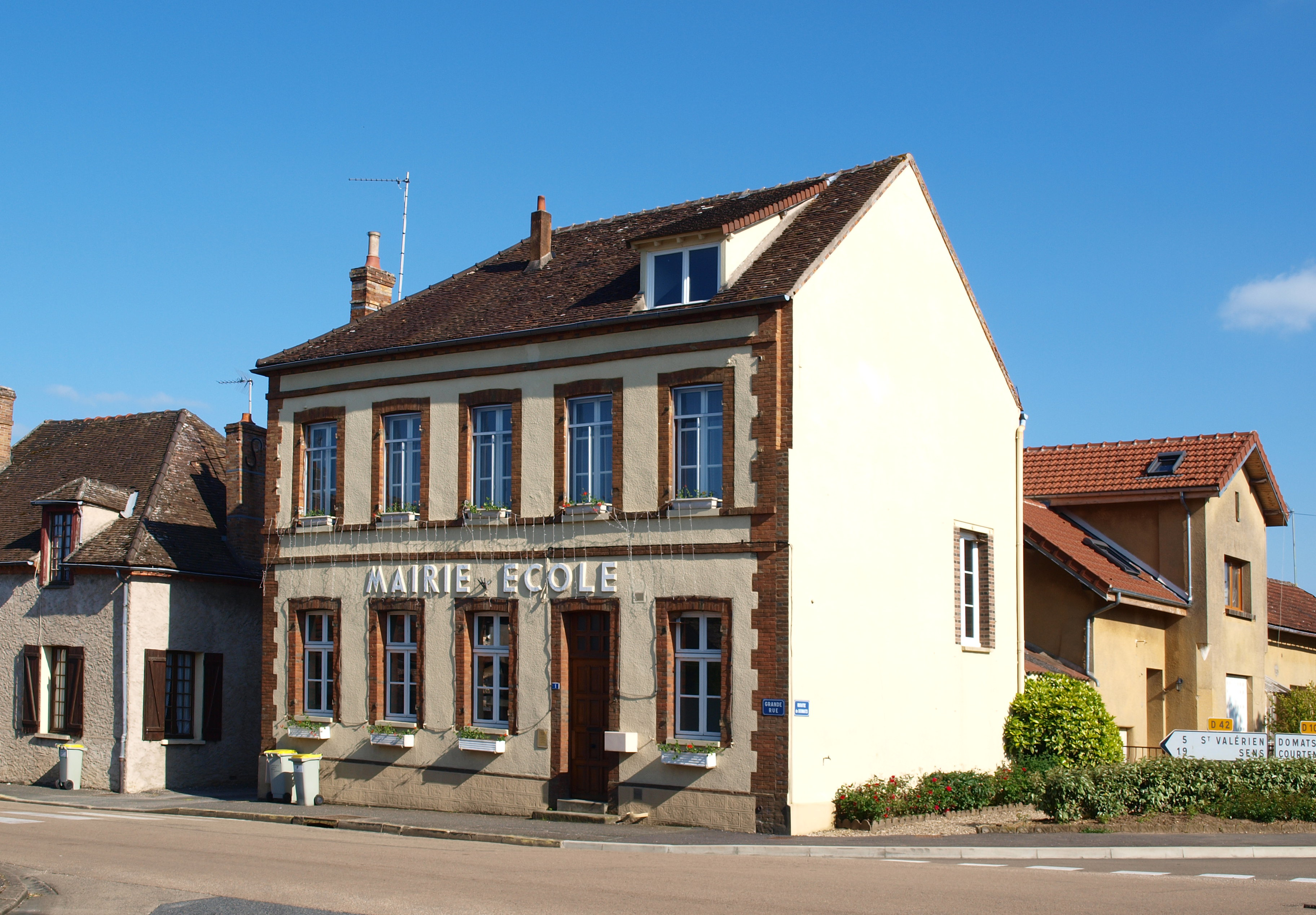
- The town hall in Montacher-Villegardin

- Coat of arms
- Location of Montacher-Villegardin
- Location within France Location within Bourgogne-Franche-Comté
- Coordinates: 48°10′24″N 3°01′48″E
- Country: France
- Region: Bourgogne-Franche-Comté
- Department: Yonne
- Arrondissement: Sens
- Canton: Gâtinais en Bourgogne

Government
  - Mayor (2022–2026): Fred Jean-Charles
- Area^{1}: 29.20 km^{2} (11.27 sq mi)
- Highest elevation: 164 m (538 ft)
- Lowest elevation: 128 m (420 ft)
- Population (2023): 719
  - Density: 24.6/km^{2} (63.8/sq mi)
- Time zone: UTC+01:00 (CET)
  - Summer (DST): UTC+02:00 (CEST)
- INSEE/Postal code: 89264 /89150
- ^{1} French Land Register data, which excludes lakes, ponds, glaciers > 1 km^{2} (0.386 sq mi or 247 acres) and river estuaries.

Montacher-Villegardin (French pronunciation: [mɔ̃taʃe vilɡaʁdɛ̃]) is a commune in the Yonne department in Bourgogne-Franche-Comté in north-central France.

== Geography ==
The commune is traversed by the river Lunain, a tributary of the Loing.

== See also ==
- Communes of the Yonne department
