= Domats =

- Commune
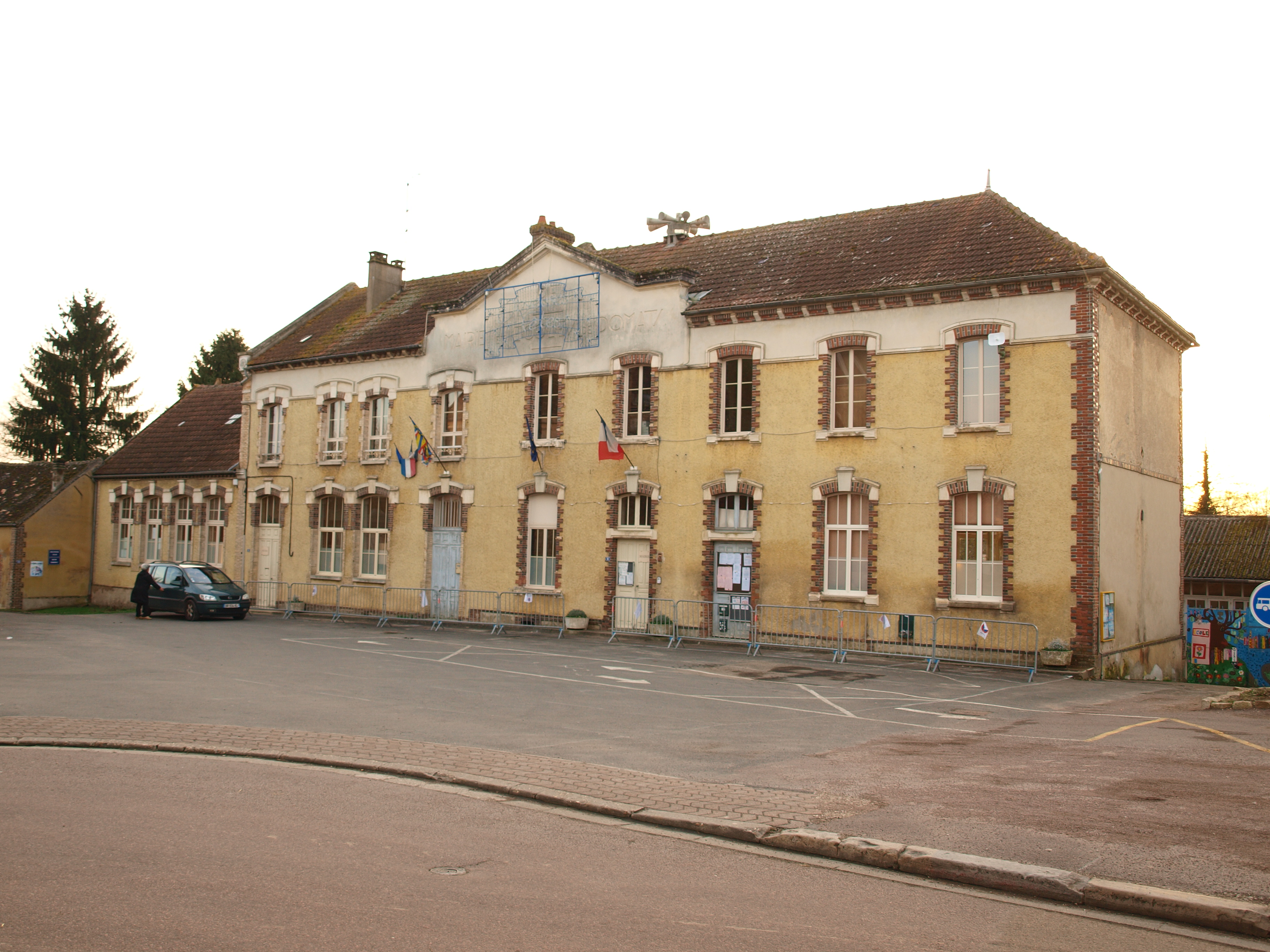
- The town hall in Domats
- Location of Domats
- Location within France Location within Bourgogne-Franche-Comté
- Coordinates: 48°06′53″N 3°04′02″E
- Country: France
- Region: Bourgogne-Franche-Comté
- Department: Yonne
- Arrondissement: Sens
- Canton: Gâtinais en Bourgogne
- Area^{1}: 24.15 km^{2} (9.32 sq mi)
- Highest elevation: 183 m (600 ft)
- Lowest elevation: 139 m (456 ft)
- Population (2023): 779
  - Density: 32.3/km^{2} (83.5/sq mi)
- Time zone: UTC+01:00 (CET)
  - Summer (DST): UTC+02:00 (CEST)
- INSEE/Postal code: 89144 /89150
- ^{1} French Land Register data, which excludes lakes, ponds, glaciers > 1 km^{2} (0.386 sq mi or 247 acres) and river estuaries.

Domats is a commune in the Yonne department in Bourgogne-Franche-Comté in north-central France.

== See also ==
- Communes of the Yonne department
