= Fouchères, Yonne =

Fouchères
- Commune
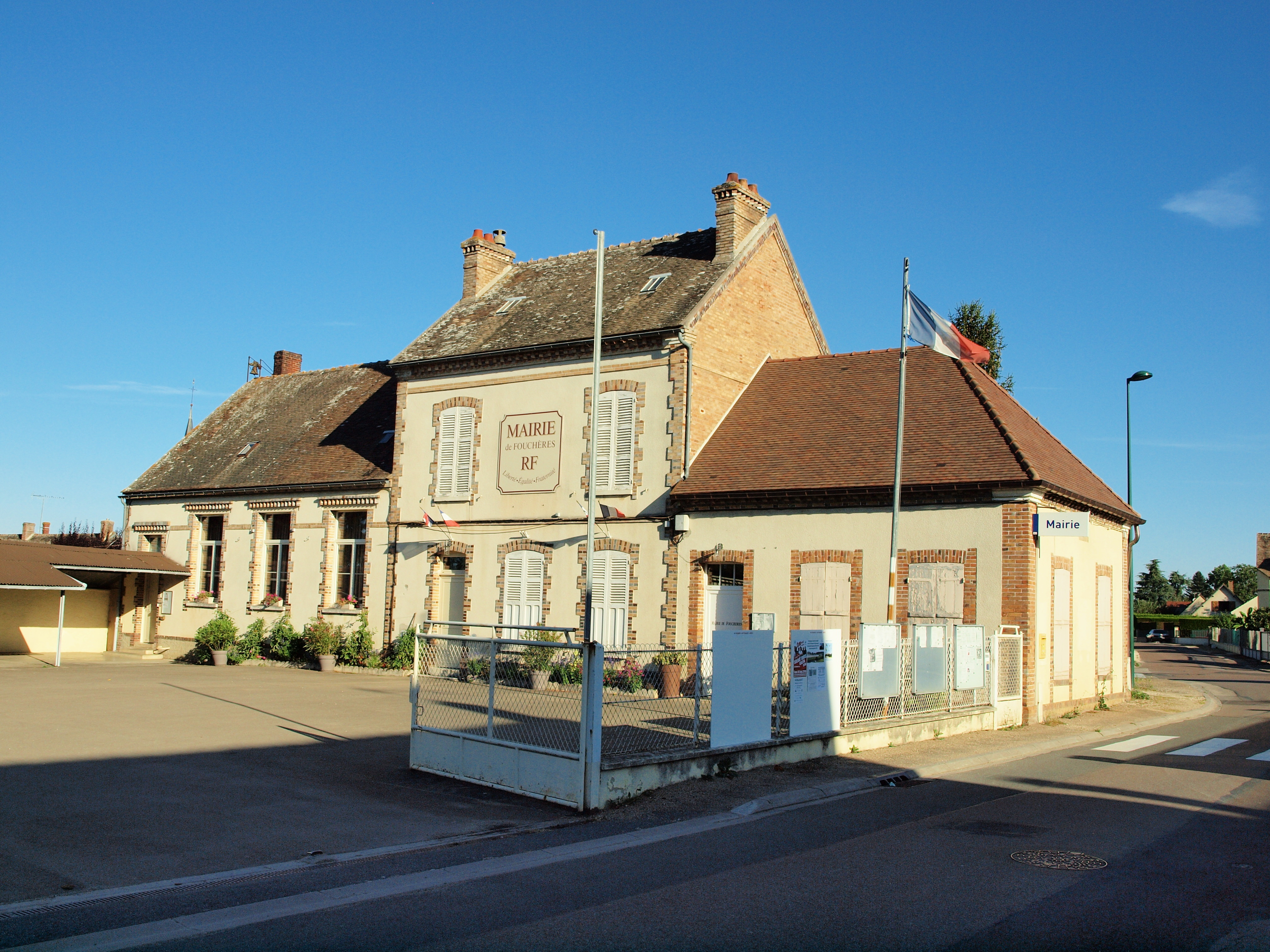
- The town hall in Fouchères

- Coat of arms
- Location of Fouchères
- Location within France Location within Bourgogne-Franche-Comté
- Coordinates: 48°10′08″N 3°08′25″E
- Country: France
- Region: Bourgogne-Franche-Comté
- Department: Yonne
- Arrondissement: Sens
- Canton: Gâtinais en Bourgogne
- Area^{1}: 14.72 km^{2} (5.68 sq mi)
- Highest elevation: 201 m (659 ft)
- Lowest elevation: 158 m (518 ft)
- Population (2023): 442
  - Density: 30.0/km^{2} (77.8/sq mi)
- Time zone: UTC+01:00 (CET)
  - Summer (DST): UTC+02:00 (CEST)
- INSEE/Postal code: 89180 /89150
- ^{1} French Land Register data, which excludes lakes, ponds, glaciers > 1 km^{2} (0.386 sq mi or 247 acres) and river estuaries.

Fouchères is a commune in the Yonne department in Bourgogne-Franche-Comté in north-central France.

== See also ==
- Communes of the Yonne department
