= Fouchères, Aube =

Commune in Grand Est, France

Fouchères
- Commune
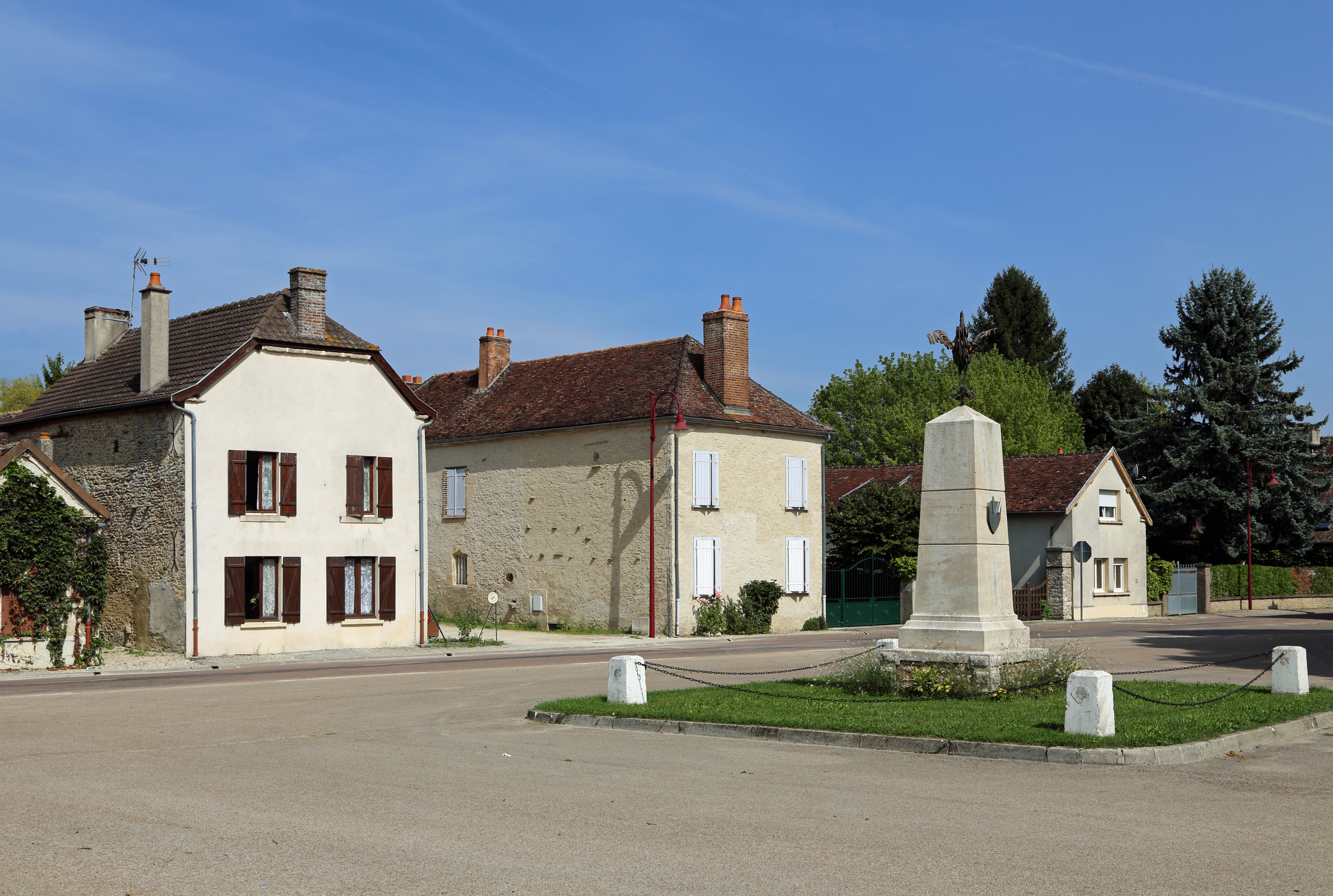
- The church square in Fouchères

- Coat of arms
- Location of Fouchères
- Location within France Location within Grand Est
- Coordinates: 48°08′59″N 4°15′56″E
- Country: France
- Region: Grand Est
- Department: Aube
- Arrondissement: Troyes
- Canton: Bar-sur-Seine
- Intercommunality: CC du Barséquanais en Champagne

Government
  - Mayor (2021–2026): Fatma Yilmaz
- Area^{1}: 8.58 km^{2} (3.31 sq mi)
- Elevation: 138 m (453 ft)
- Highest elevation: 192 m (630 ft)
- Lowest elevation: 130 m (430 ft)
- Population (2023): 503
  - Density: 58.6/km^{2} (152/sq mi)
- Time zone: UTC+01:00 (CET)
  - Summer (DST): UTC+02:00 (CEST)
- INSEE/Postal code: 10158 /10260
- ^{1} French Land Register data, which excludes lakes, ponds, glaciers > 1 km^{2} (0.386 sq mi or 247 acres) and river estuaries.

Fouchères (French pronunciation: [fuʃɛʁ]) is a rural commune in the Aube department in north-central France. Located on the river Seine upstream of Troyes, it is best known for its 18th-century Château de Vaux, also known as the Château de Vaux-en-Champagne, by architect Germain Boffrand.

== Population ==
Historical population
Year	Pop.	±% p.a.
1968	339	—
1975	321	−0.78%
1982	394	+2.97%
1990	422	+0.86%
1999	450	+0.72%
2007	476	+0.70%
2012	542	+2.63%
2017	531	−0.41%
2023	503	−0.90%
Source: INSEE

== Gallery ==
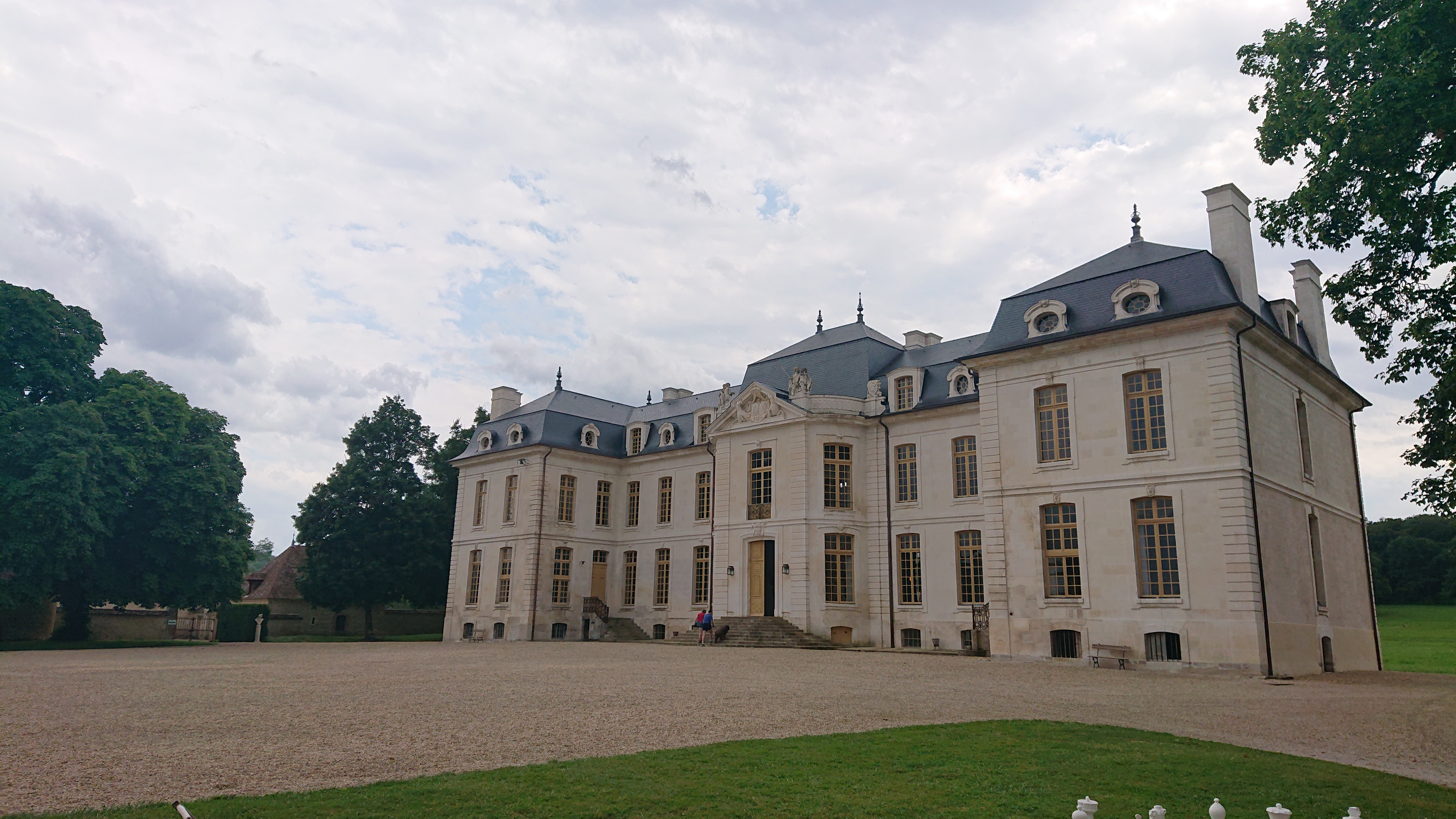
Château de Vaux

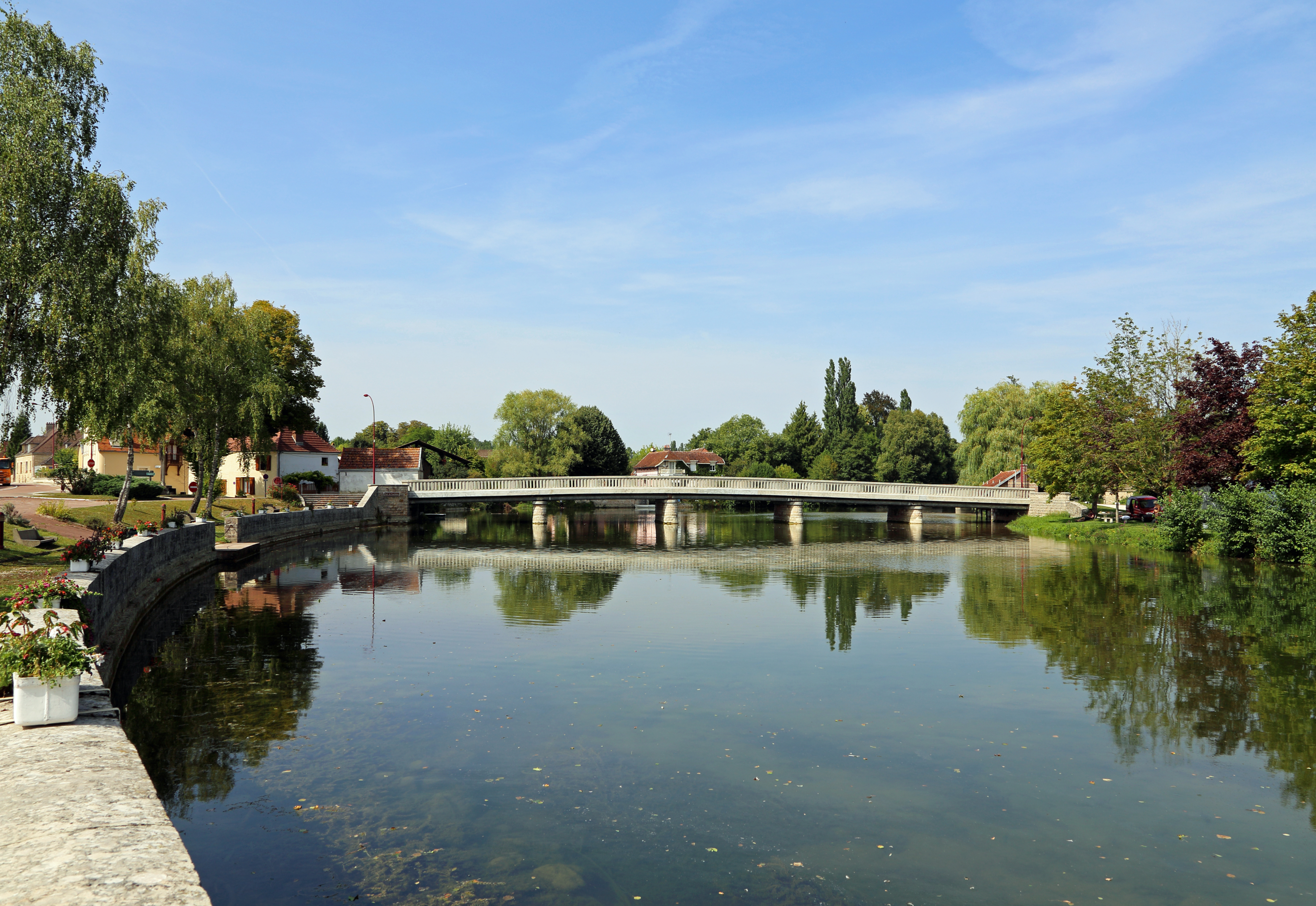
The Seine and the bridge of Fouchères

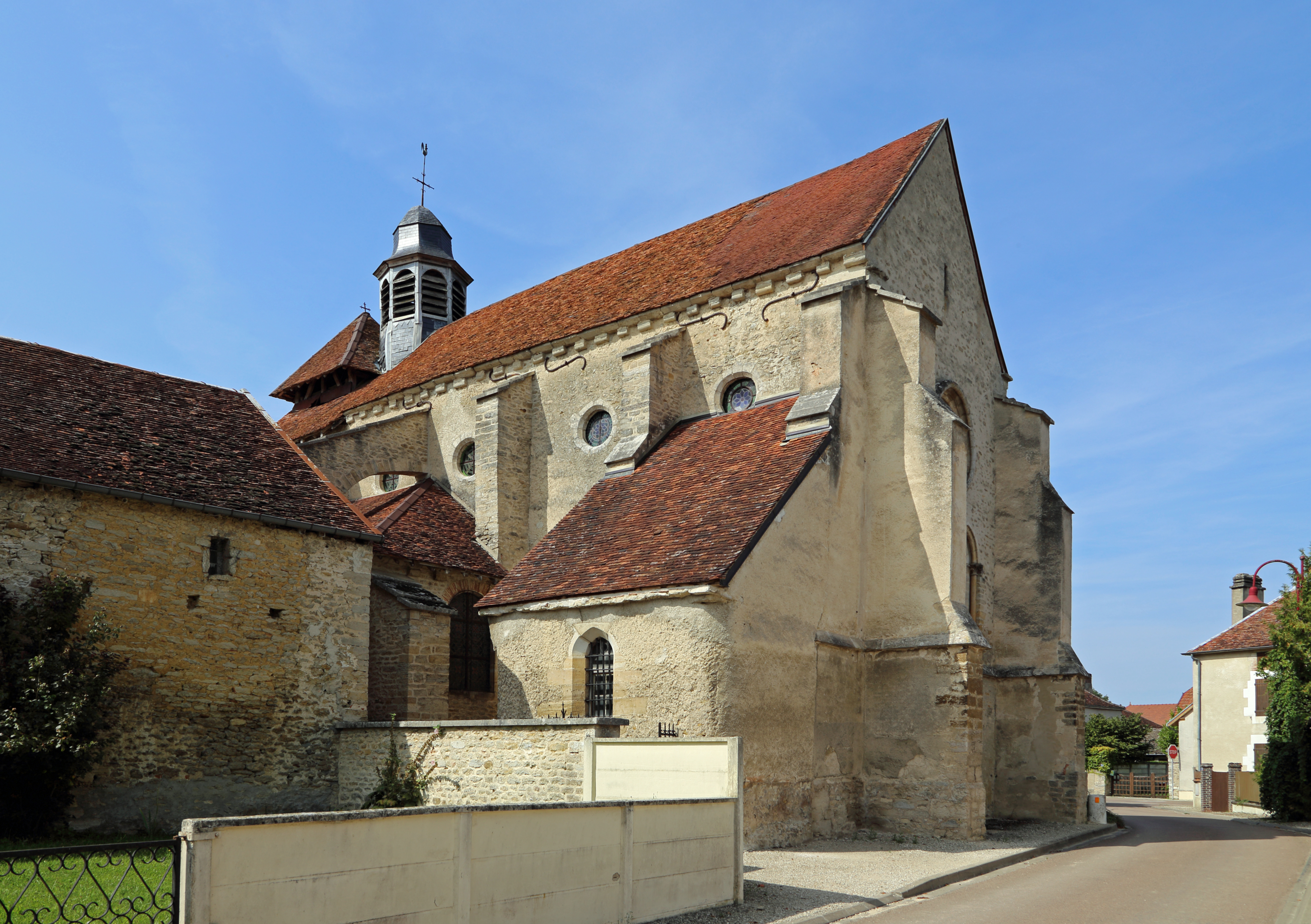
Nativity of the Blessed Virgin Mary Church

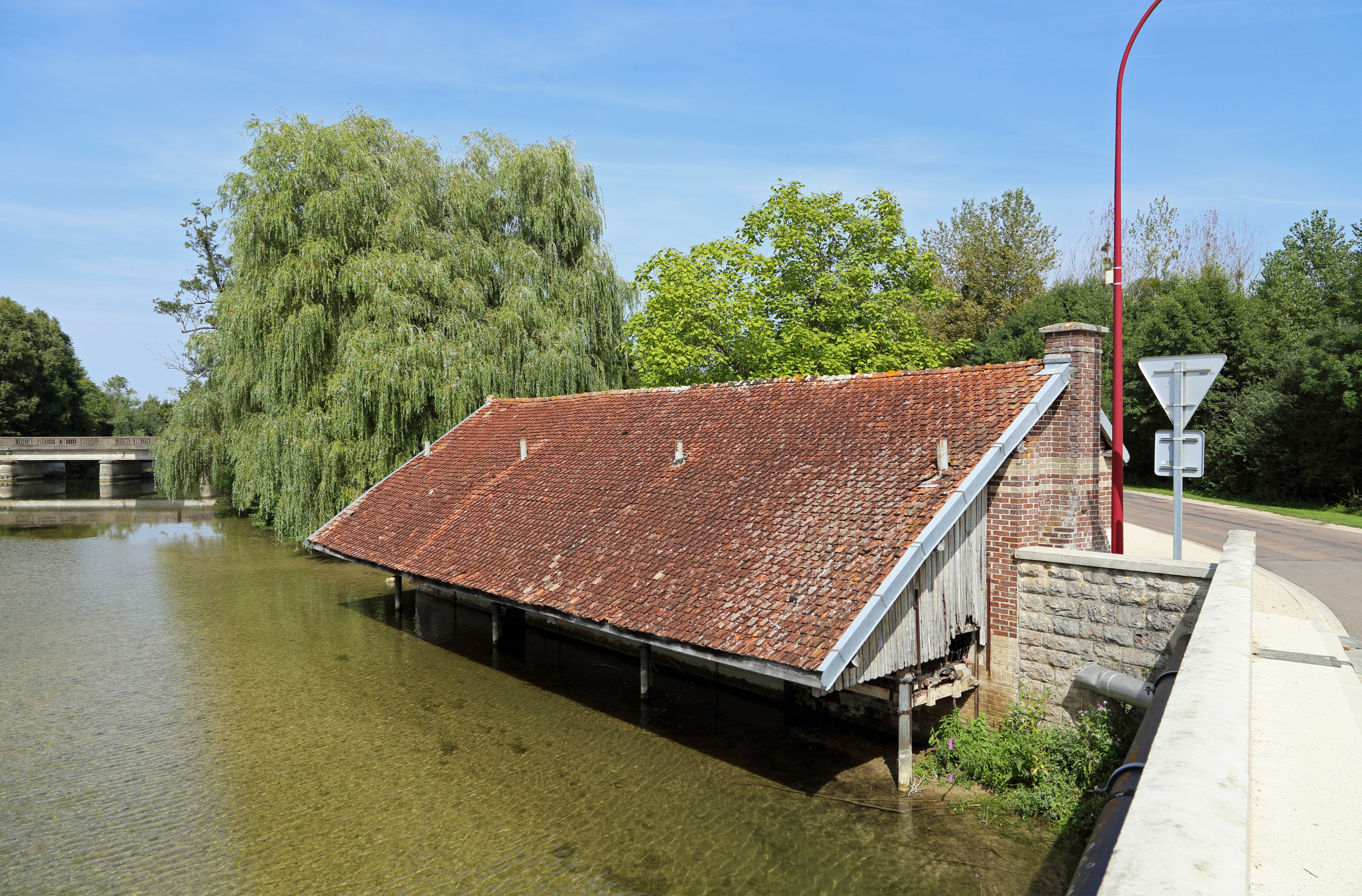
The wash house (lavoir)

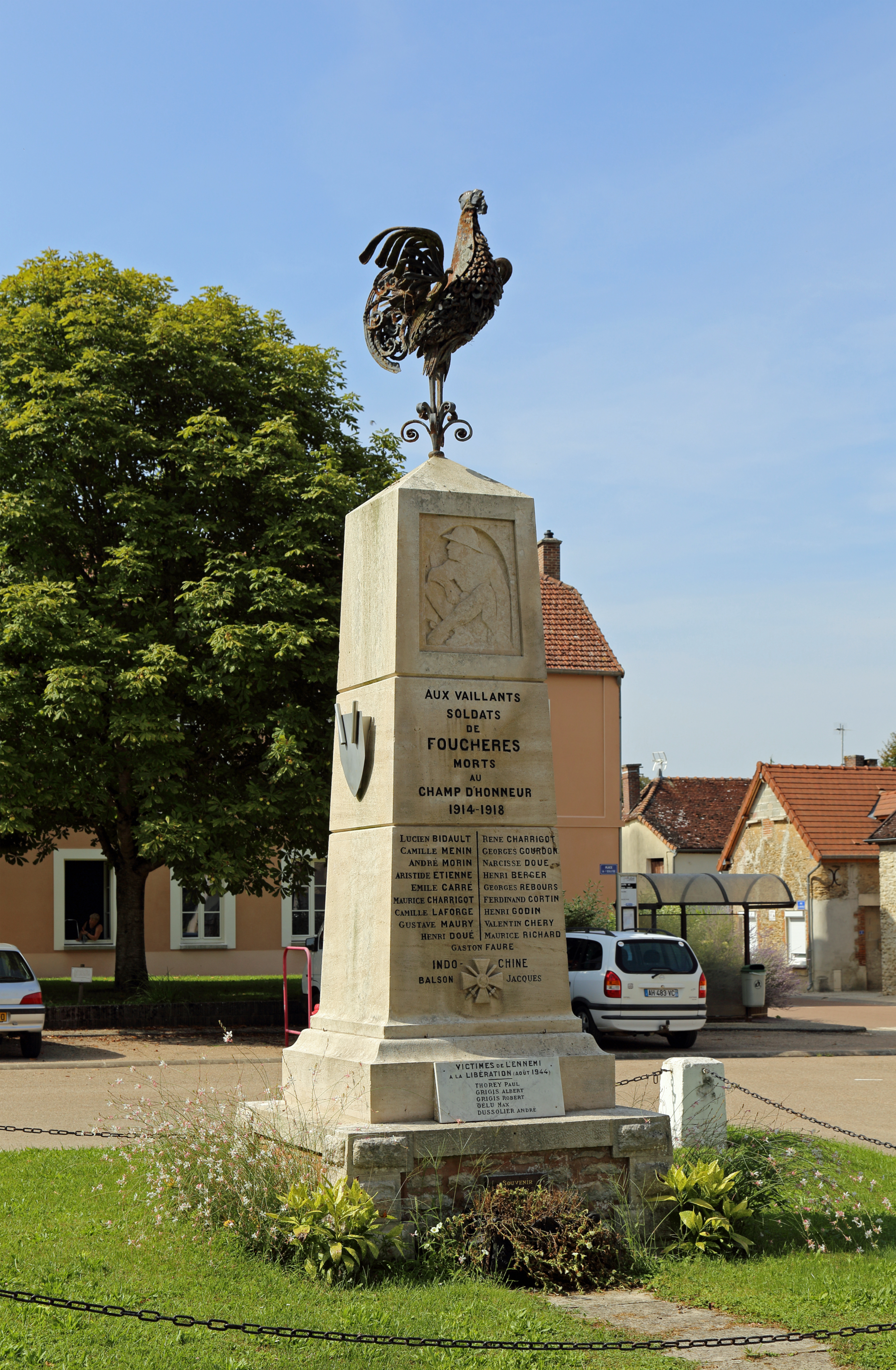
War memorial

== See also ==
- Communes of the Aube department
- List of medieval bridges in France
