= Brannay =

- Commune
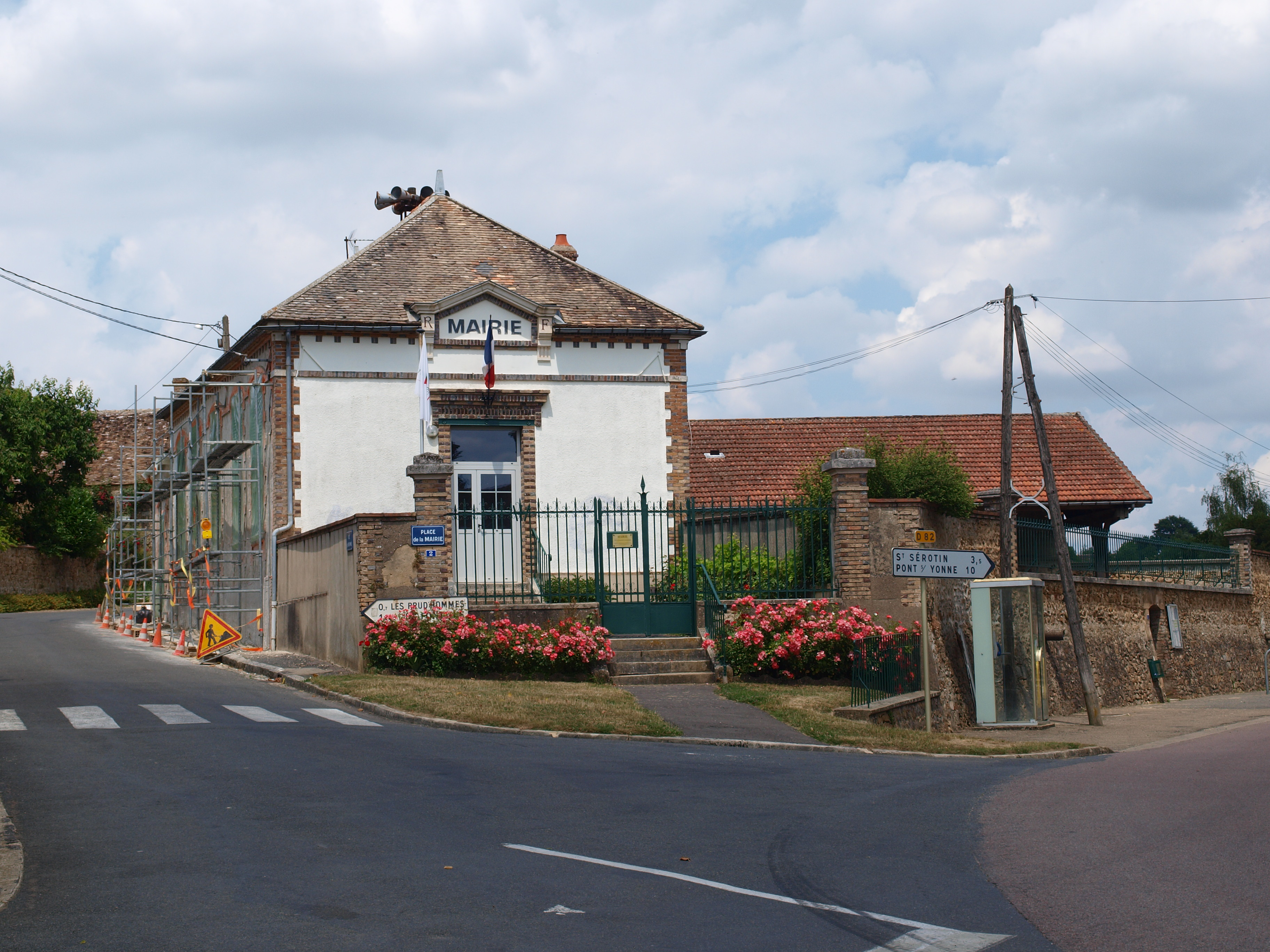
- The town hall in Brannay

- Coat of arms
- Location of Brannay
- Location within France Location within Bourgogne-Franche-Comté
- Coordinates: 48°13′52″N 3°07′06″E
- Country: France
- Region: Bourgogne-Franche-Comté
- Department: Yonne
- Arrondissement: Sens
- Canton: Gâtinais en Bourgogne

Government
  - Mayor (2020–2026): David Roussel
- Area^{1}: 10.81 km^{2} (4.17 sq mi)
- Highest elevation: 191 m (627 ft)
- Lowest elevation: 139 m (456 ft)
- Population (2023): 773
  - Density: 71.5/km^{2} (185/sq mi)
- Time zone: UTC+01:00 (CET)
  - Summer (DST): UTC+02:00 (CEST)
- INSEE/Postal code: 89054 /89150
- ^{1} French Land Register data, which excludes lakes, ponds, glaciers > 1 km^{2} (0.386 sq mi or 247 acres) and river estuaries.

Brannay (French pronunciation: [bʁanɛ]) is a commune in the Yonne department in the region of Bourgogne-Franche-Comté in north-central France.

== See also ==
- Communes of the Yonne department
