= Morvan (disambiguation) =

Morvan is a mountainous massif in central-east France.

Morvan may also be:

== Places ==
- Miniac-Morvan
- Baguer-Morvan
- Herbularium du Morvan
- Alligny-en-Morvan
- Ouroux-en-Morvan
- Montigny-en-Morvan
- Villiers-en-Morvan
- Champeau-en-Morvan
- Dompierre-en-Morvan
- Chissey-en-Morvan
- Moux-en-Morvan
- Brazey-en-Morvan
- Roussillon-en-Morvan
- Cussy-en-Morvan
- Saint-Hilaire-en-Morvan
- La Celle-en-Morvan
- Saint-André-en-Morvan

== People ==
=== Given name ===
- Morvan Lebesque (1911–1970), a Breton nationalist activist and French journalist
- Morvan Marchal (1900–1963), an architect and a militant Breton nationalist

=== Surname ===
- Jean-David Morvan, French comics author
- Augustin Marie Morvan (1819 - 1897), a French physician, politician, and writer
- Fab Morvan, a French singer-songwriter, dancer and model
- Françoise Morvan a French writer who specialises in Breton history and culture
- Joseph Morvan (1924–1999), a French professional road bicycle racer
- Frères Morvan, a group of traditional singers formed in 1958
- Jean-Baptiste Morvan de Bellegarde (1648–1734), a French Jesuit
- Yan Morvan (1954–2024), French photographer, journalist

== See also ==
- Morvan's syndrome
- 88795 Morvan
