= Gien-sur-Cure =

- Commune
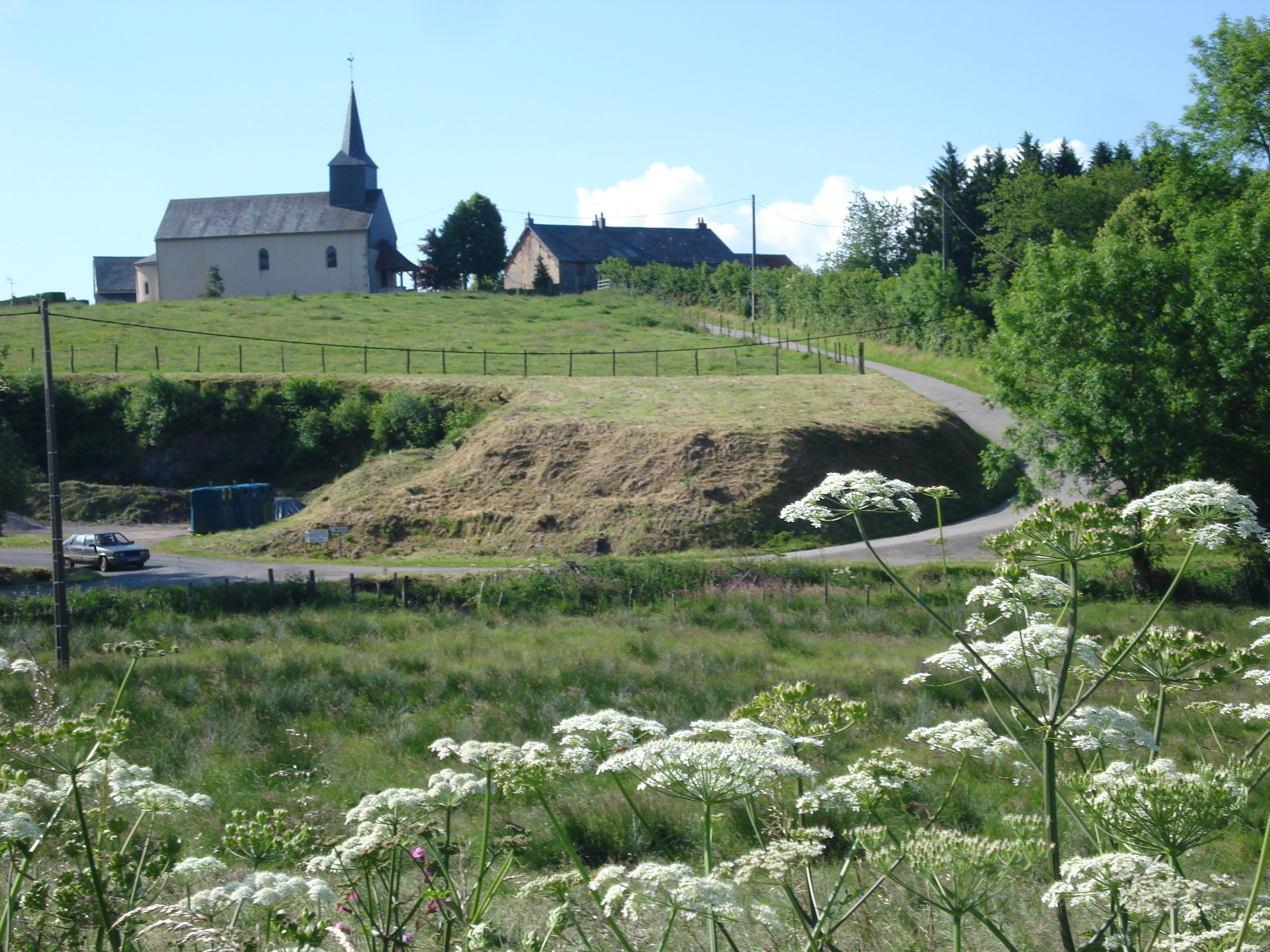
- A general view of Gien-sur-Cure
- Location of Gien-sur-Cure
- Location within France Location within Bourgogne-Franche-Comté
- Coordinates: 47°08′16″N 4°06′01″E
- Country: France
- Region: Bourgogne-Franche-Comté
- Department: Nièvre
- Arrondissement: Château-Chinon (Ville)
- Canton: Château-Chinon

Government
  - Mayor (2020–2026): Laurent Cottin
- Area^{1}: 11.04 km^{2} (4.26 sq mi)
- Highest elevation: 695 m (2,280 ft)
- Lowest elevation: 584 m (1,916 ft)
- Population (2023): 90
  - Density: 8.2/km^{2} (21/sq mi)
- Time zone: UTC+01:00 (CET)
  - Summer (DST): UTC+02:00 (CEST)
- INSEE/Postal code: 58125 /58230
- ^{1} French Land Register data, which excludes lakes, ponds, glaciers > 1 km^{2} (0.386 sq mi or 247 acres) and river estuaries.

Gien-sur-Cure (French pronunciation: [ʒjɛ̃ syʁ kyʁ], lit. 'Gien-on-Cure') is a commune in the Nièvre department in the Bourgogne-Franche-Comté region in central-east France. As of 2023, the population of the commune was 90. Part of Morvan Regional Natural Park, Gien-sur-Cure is located on the departmental border with both Saône-et-Loire—at Anost and Cussy-en-Morvan—and Côte-d'Or—at the Ménessaire exclave.

== See also ==
- Communes of the Nièvre department
- Morvan Regional Natural Park
