= Bard-le-Régulier =

- Commune
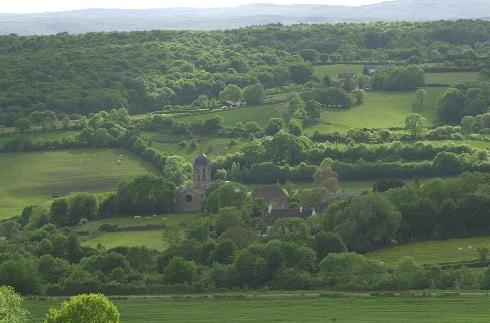
- A general view of Bard-le-Régulier
- Location of Bard-le-Régulier
- Location within France Location within Bourgogne-Franche-Comté
- Coordinates: 47°08′47″N 4°19′01″E
- Country: France
- Region: Bourgogne-Franche-Comté
- Department: Côte-d'Or
- Arrondissement: Beaune
- Canton: Arnay-le-Duc
- Intercommunality: Pays Arnay Liernais

Government
  - Mayor (2020–2026): Patrick Genotte
- Area^{1}: 9.1 km^{2} (3.5 sq mi)
- Elevation: 450 m (1,480 ft)
- Highest elevation: 550 m (1,800 ft)
- Lowest elevation: 394 m (1,293 ft)
- Population (2023): 73
  - Density: 8.0/km^{2} (21/sq mi)
- Time zone: UTC+01:00 (CET)
  - Summer (DST): UTC+02:00 (CEST)
- INSEE/Postal code: 21046 /21430
- ^{1} French Land Register data, which excludes lakes, ponds, glaciers > 1 km^{2} (0.386 sq mi or 247 acres) and river estuaries.

Bard-le-Régulier (French pronunciation: [baʁ lə ʁeɡylje]) is a commune in the Côte-d'Or department in the Bourgogne-Franche-Comté region of eastern France.

== Geography ==
Bard-le-Régulier is located in the Massif of Morvan in a natural regional park at the foot of Mount Bard some 60 km south-west of Dijon, 25 km north of Autun, and 12 km west of Arnay-le-Duc. Access to the commune is by the D15 road from Brazey-en-Morvan in the north which passes through the heart of the commune and the village before continuing south to join the D11 south of Manlay. The D15E goes north-east from the village to Vianges. The D115 goes south-west from the village to join the D233 south-west of the commune after changing to the D247 at the departmental border. A railway line passes through the commune from north to south but there is no station in the commune with the nearest station some 2 km south-east of the commune. The commune is quite heavily forested but with large areas of farmland.

The Trévoux rises from a small lake in the north of the commune and flows south through the village continuing south to eventually join the Arroux north-west of Igornay.

== History ==
Bard-le-Régulier appears as Bard on the 1750 Cassini Map and does not appear on the 1790 version.

== Administration ==
List of Successive Mayors

From	To	Name
2001	2020	Raymond Morel
2020	2026	Patrick Genotte

== Demography ==
The inhabitants of the commune are known as Barriens or Barriennes in French.

Historical population

Year	Pop.	±% p.a.
1793	301	—
1821	254	−0.60%
1846	281	+0.40%
1872	299	+0.24%
1901	260	−0.48%
1926	188	−1.29%
1946	210	+0.55%
1962	140	−2.50%
1968	142	+0.24%

Year	Pop.	±% p.a.
1975	120	−2.38%
1982	105	−1.89%
1990	90	−1.91%
1999	75	−2.01%
2007	66	−1.59%
2012	72	+1.76%
2017	72	+0.00%
2023	73	+0.23%

Source: EHESS and INSEE

== Culture and heritage ==
=== Civil heritage ===
The commune has a number of sites that are registered as historical monuments:

- A Farmhouse on the D115 (19th century)
- A Farmhouse on the D115 (19th century)
- Houses and Farms (16th-19th century)

=== Religious heritage ===
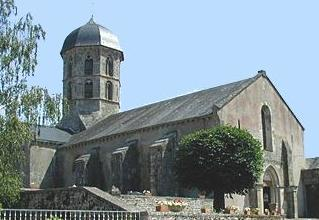
The Church of Saint John the Evangelist

- The Church of Saint John the Evangelist (11th century) is registered as an historical monument. The Church is surmounted by an octagonal bell tower which was built in the 11th to the 14th centuries. It depended on the priory of the Canons Regular of Saint Augustine. The Church contains several items that are registered as historical objects:
  - An Altar (12th century)
  - An Altar Table (12th century)
  - A Statue: Saint Sebastian (16th century)
  - A Statue: Saint John the Evangelist drinking the poisoned cup (15th century)
  - A Sculpture: Jean Brazey reclining (14th century)
  - The Upper and Lower Stalls (14th century)

Church Picture Gallery

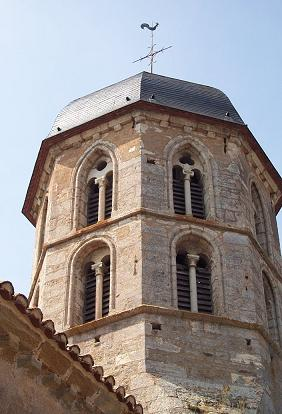
The Bell Tower

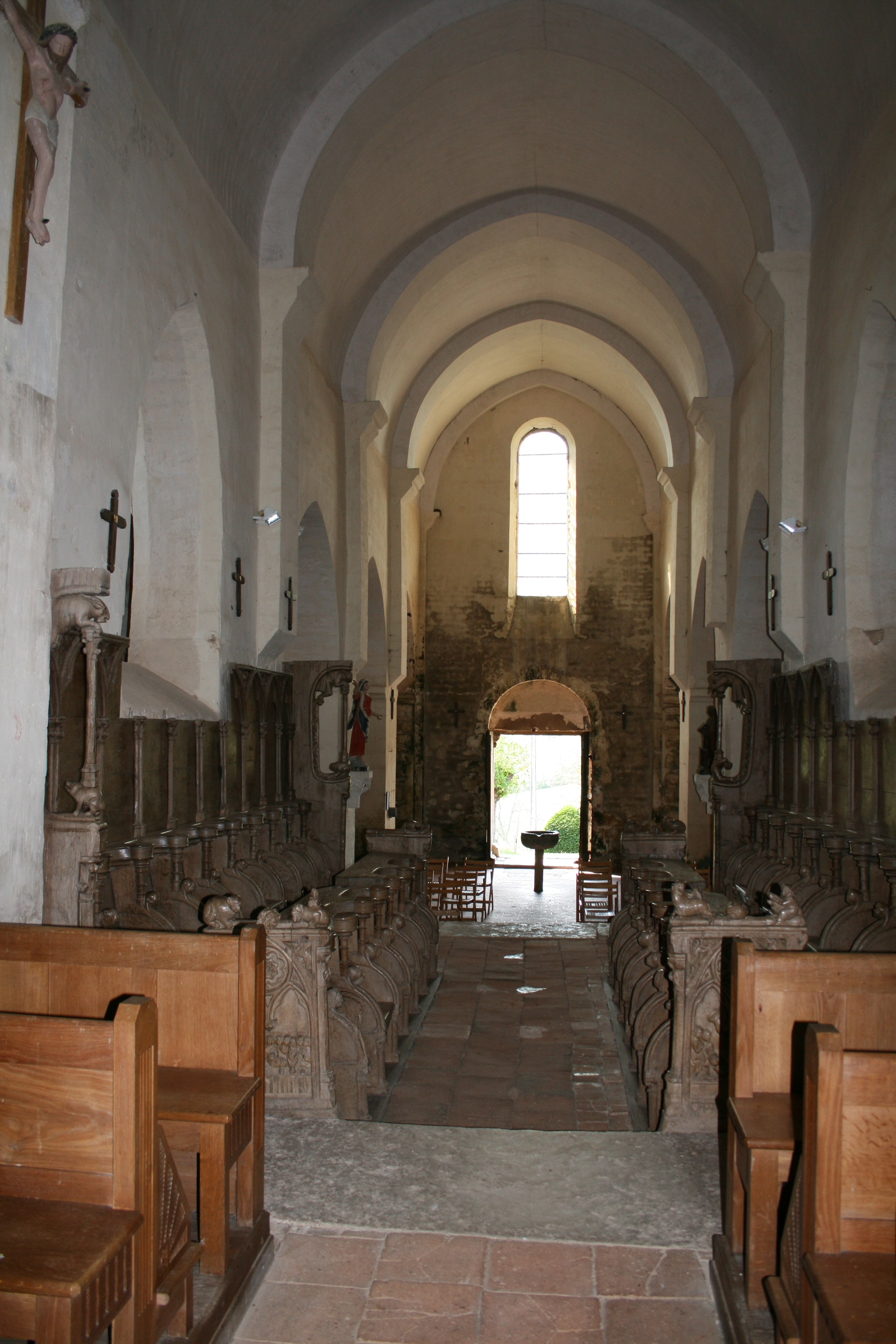
The nave

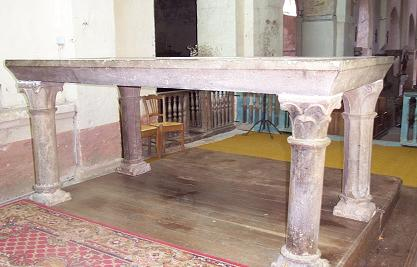
The Altar Table (12th century)

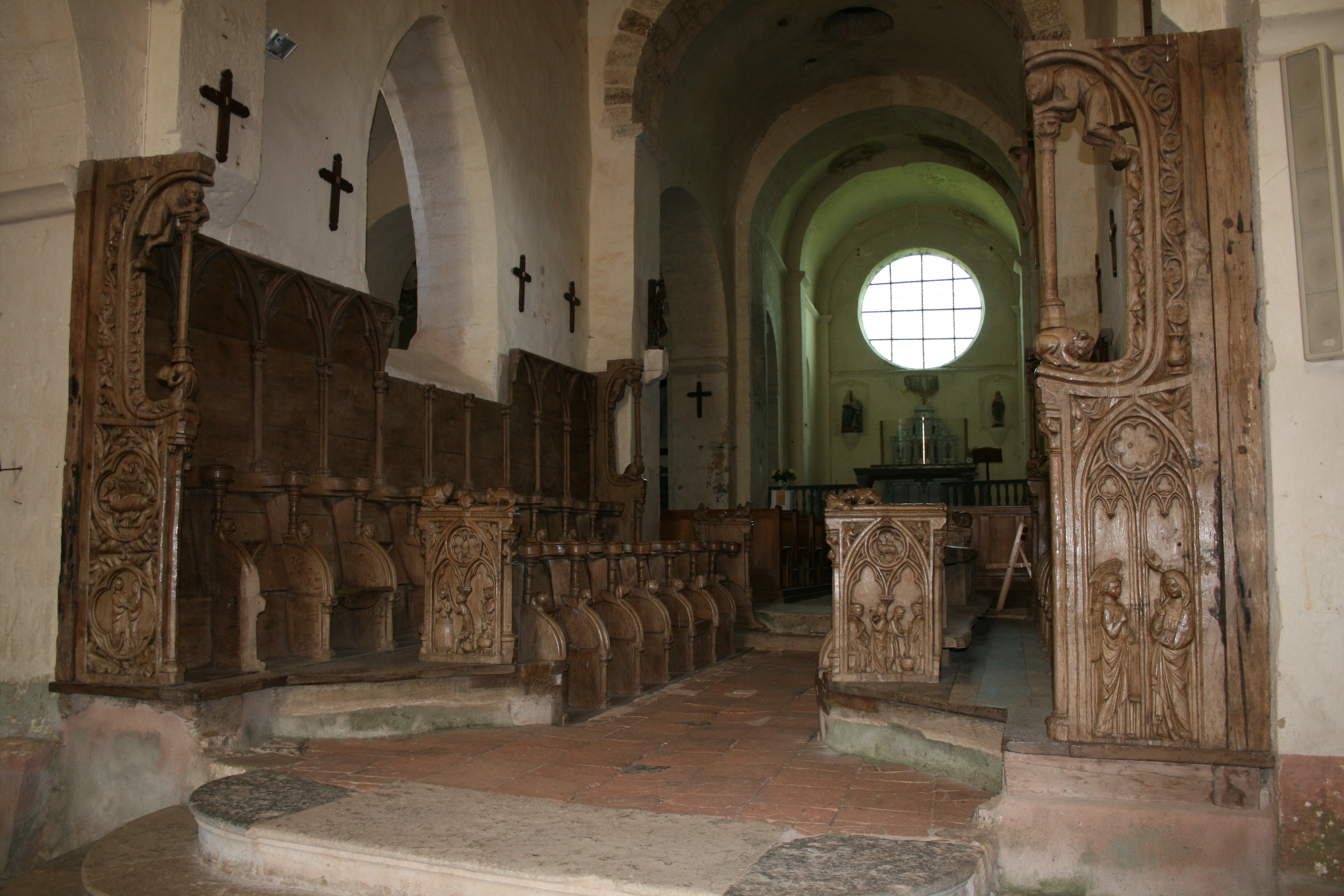
The Stalls (14th century)

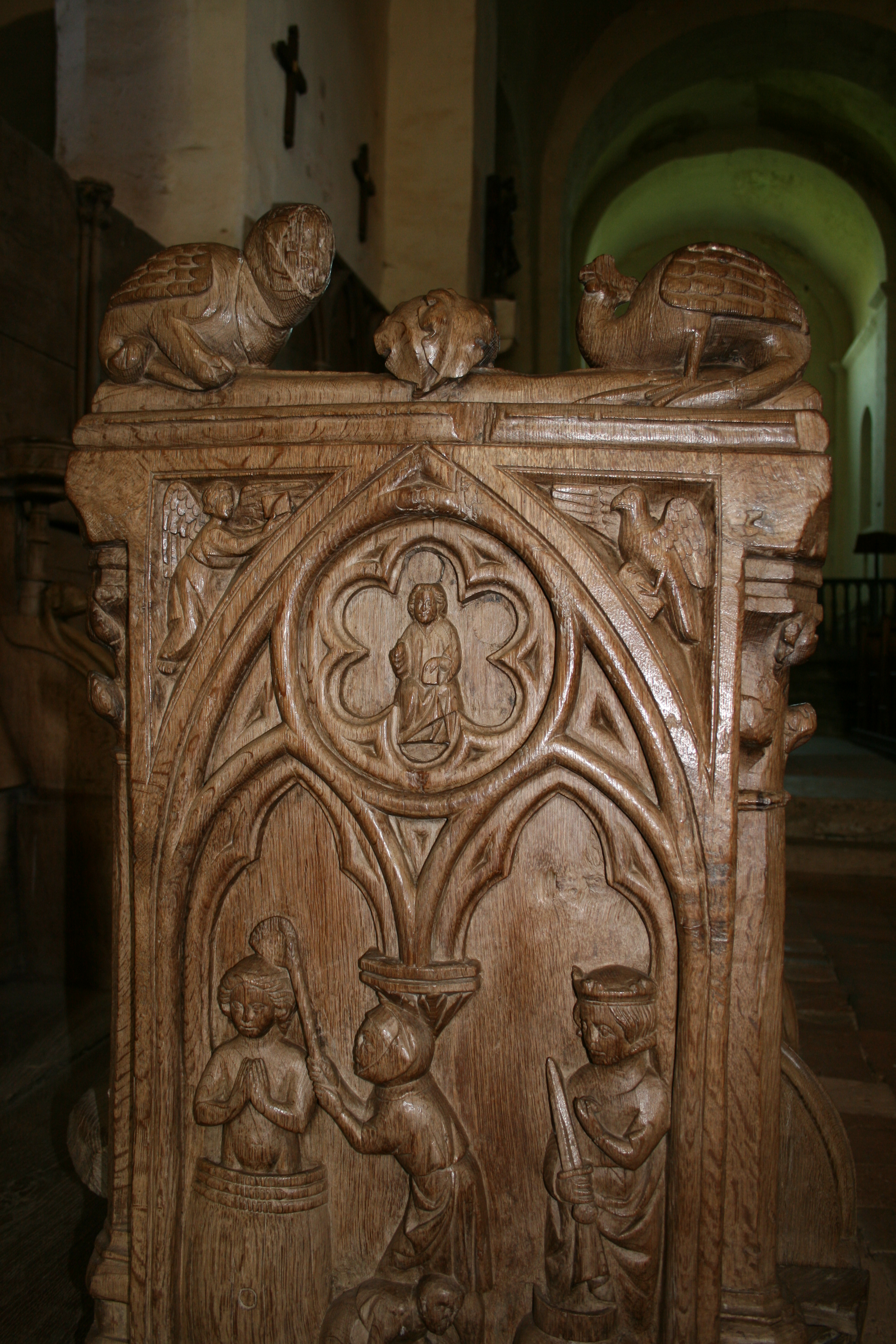
A detail on the Stalls

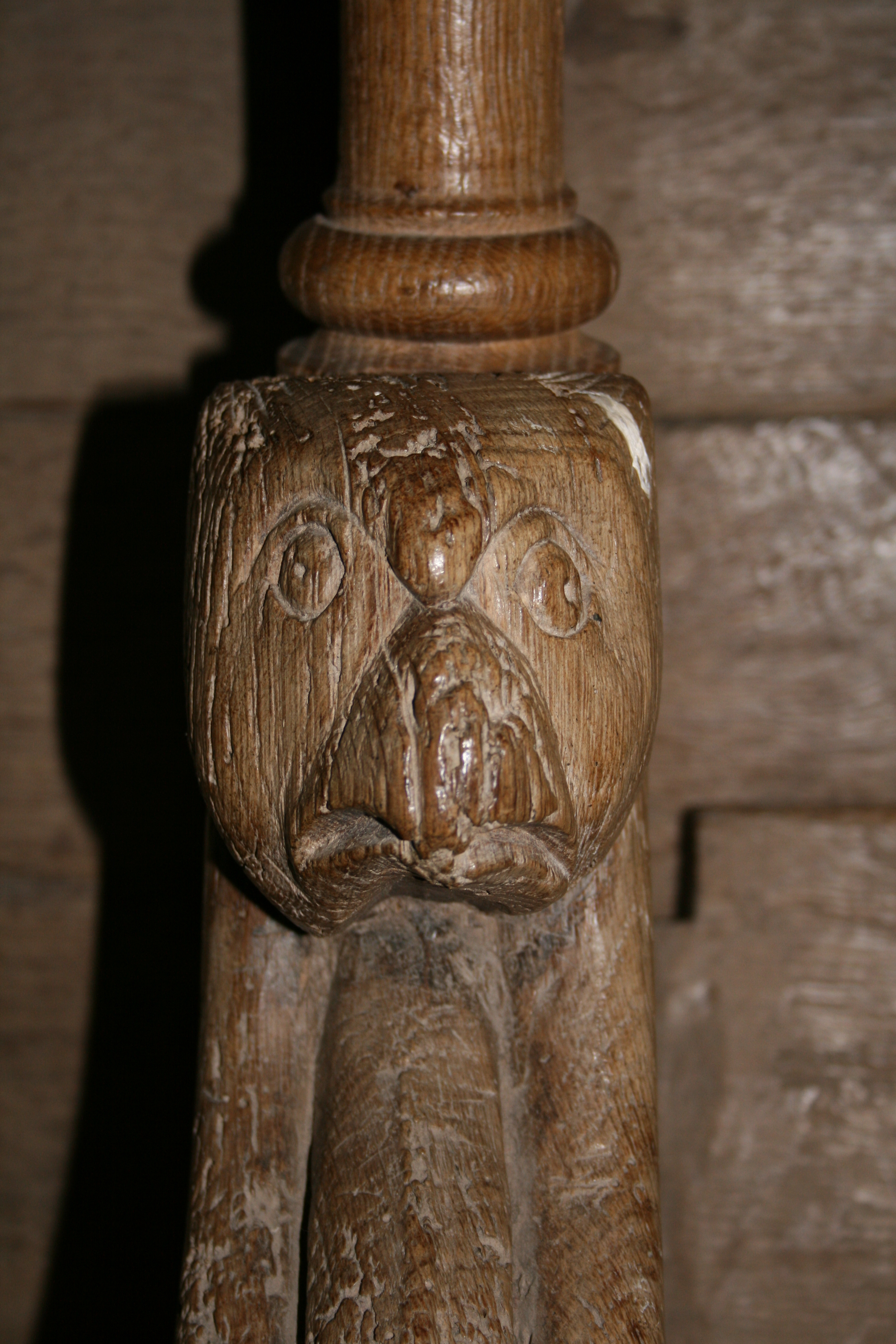
A detail on the Stalls

== See also ==
- Communes of the Côte-d'Or department
- Parc naturel régional du Morvan
