= Brazey =

Brazey may refer to two communes in the Côte-d'Or department in eastern France:

- Brazey-en-Morvan
- Brazey-en-Plaine
