= Champeaux =

Champeaux may refer to:

== People ==
- William of Champeaux, a French philosopher and theologian
- Robert de Champeaux, Abbot of Tavistock (1285-1325)
- de Champeaux family of Molland, Devon (13th century)

== Places in France ==
- Champeaux, Ille-et-Vilaine, Brittany
- Champeaux, Manche, Normandy
- Champeaux, Seine-et-Marne, Île-de-France
- Champeaux-et-la-Chapelle-Pommier, in the Dordogne département
- Champeaux-sur-Sarthe, in the Orne département
- Champeau-en-Morvan, in the Côte-d'Or département
