= Saint-Martin-de-la-Mer =

- Commune
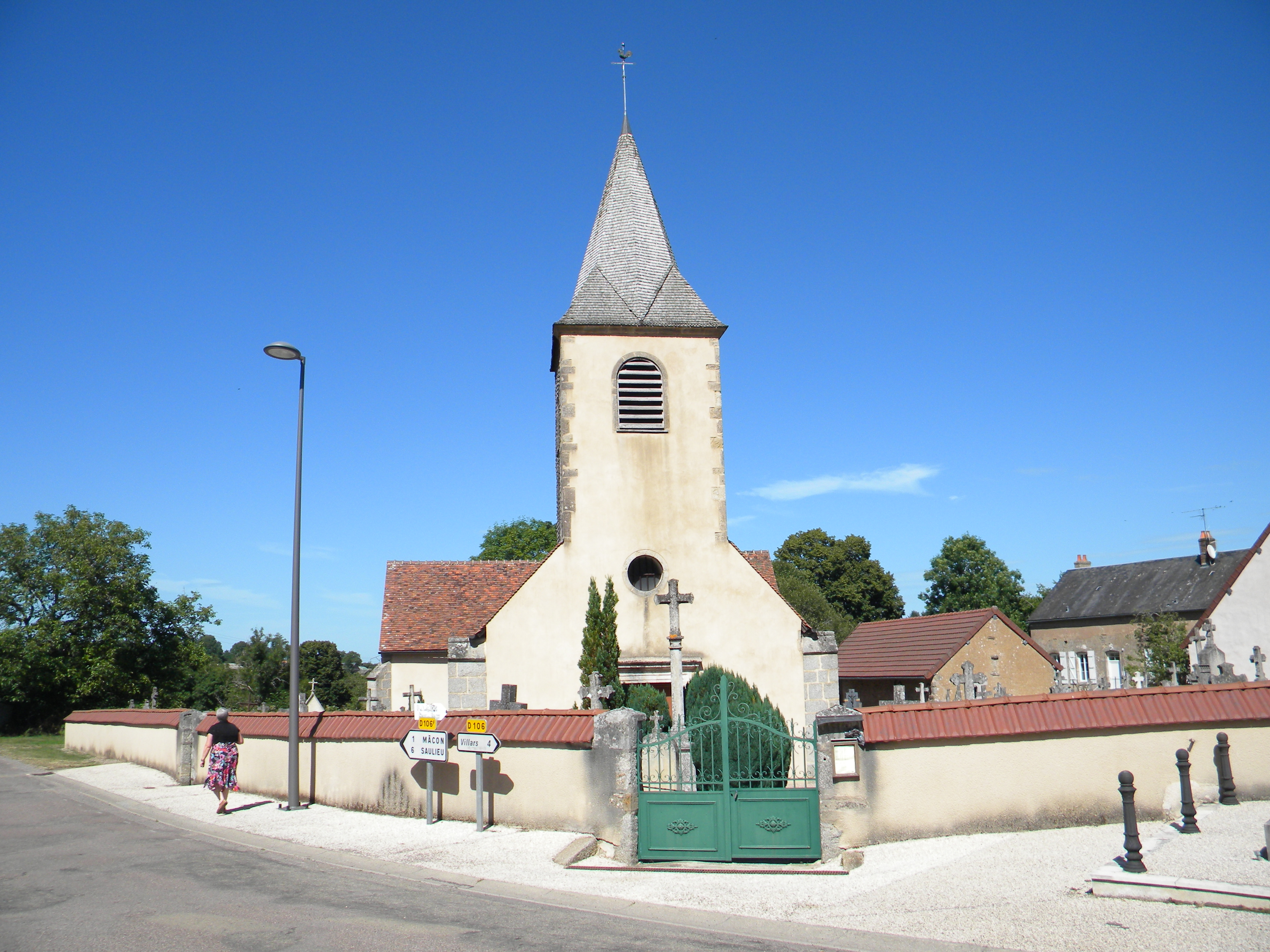
- The church in Saint-Martin-de-la-Mer
- Location of Saint-Martin-de-la-Mer
- Location within France Location within Bourgogne-Franche-Comté
- Coordinates: 47°14′13″N 4°14′05″E
- Country: France
- Region: Bourgogne-Franche-Comté
- Department: Côte-d'Or
- Arrondissement: Beaune
- Canton: Arnay-le-Duc

Government
  - Mayor (2020–2026): Denis Néault
- Area^{1}: 23.22 km^{2} (8.97 sq mi)
- Elevation: 530 m (1,740 ft)
- Highest elevation: 596 m (1,955 ft)
- Lowest elevation: 440 m (1,440 ft)
- Population (2023): 267
  - Density: 11.5/km^{2} (29.8/sq mi)
- Time zone: UTC+01:00 (CET)
  - Summer (DST): UTC+02:00 (CEST)
- INSEE/Postal code: 21560 /21210
- ^{1} French Land Register data, which excludes lakes, ponds, glaciers > 1 km^{2} (0.386 sq mi or 247 acres) and river estuaries.

Saint-Martin-de-la-Mer (French pronunciation: [sɛ̃ maʁtɛ̃ də la mɛʁ]) is a commune in the Côte-d'Or department in eastern France.

== Geography ==
Saint-Martin-de-la-Mer is located in the eastern part of the Morvan Regional National Park. It shares the Lac de Chamboux with the commune of Alligny-en-Morvan.

== Typonomy ==
The name of the locality is historically attested as Parrochia Sancti Martini de Mari (Parish of Saint-Martin-de-la-Mer) (1290); Sanctus Martinus de la Mer (1291) ; Saint Martin de la Mer (1400); Sainct Martin (1574) ; Sainct Martin de la Meit (1597); Sainct Martin de Conforgien (1599); Sainct Martin de la Mare (1624); Martin-de-la-Mer (Revolutionary period).

== Population ==
Historical population
| Year | Pop. | ±% p.a. |
|---|---|---|
| 1968 | 357 | — |
| 1975 | 296 | −2.64% |
| 1982 | 294 | −0.10% |
| 1990 | 288 | −0.26% |
| 1999 | 286 | −0.08% |
| 2007 | 279 | −0.31% |
| 2012 | 306 | +1.86% |
| 2017 | 296 | −0.66% |
| 2023 | 267 | −1.70% |
Source: INSEE

== See also ==
- Communes of the Côte-d'Or department
- Parc naturel régional du Morvan
