= Morvan Regional Natural Park =

Protected area in France

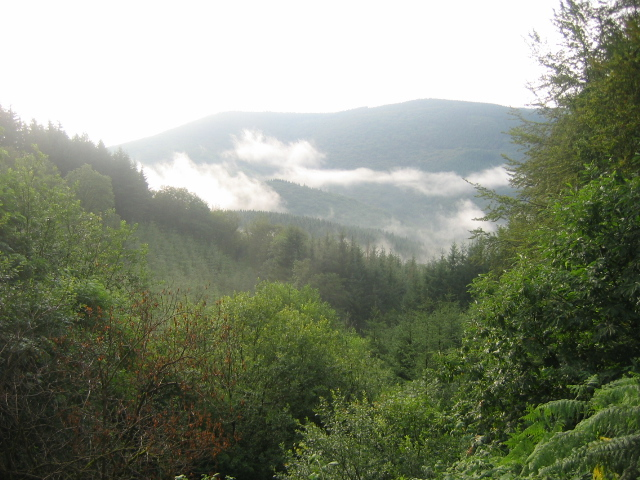

- Location within Bourgogne
- Location: Bourgogne-Franche-Comté, Nièvre; Côte-d'Or; Saône-et-Loire; Yonne, France
- Coordinates: 47.162°N 4.05°E
- Established: 1970
- Governing body: Fédération des parcs naturels régionaux de France
- Website: http://www.parcdumorvan.org/

Morvan Regional Natural Park (French: Parc naturel régional du Morvan, pronounced [paʁk natyʁɛl ʁeʒjɔnal dy mɔʁvɑ̃]) is a protected area of woodlands, lakes and traditional farmland in the Bourgogne-Franche-Comté region of central France. It covers a total area of 285,000 hectares (700,000 acres) and extends through four different departments with the majority being in Nièvre. The area was officially designated as a regional natural park in 1970.

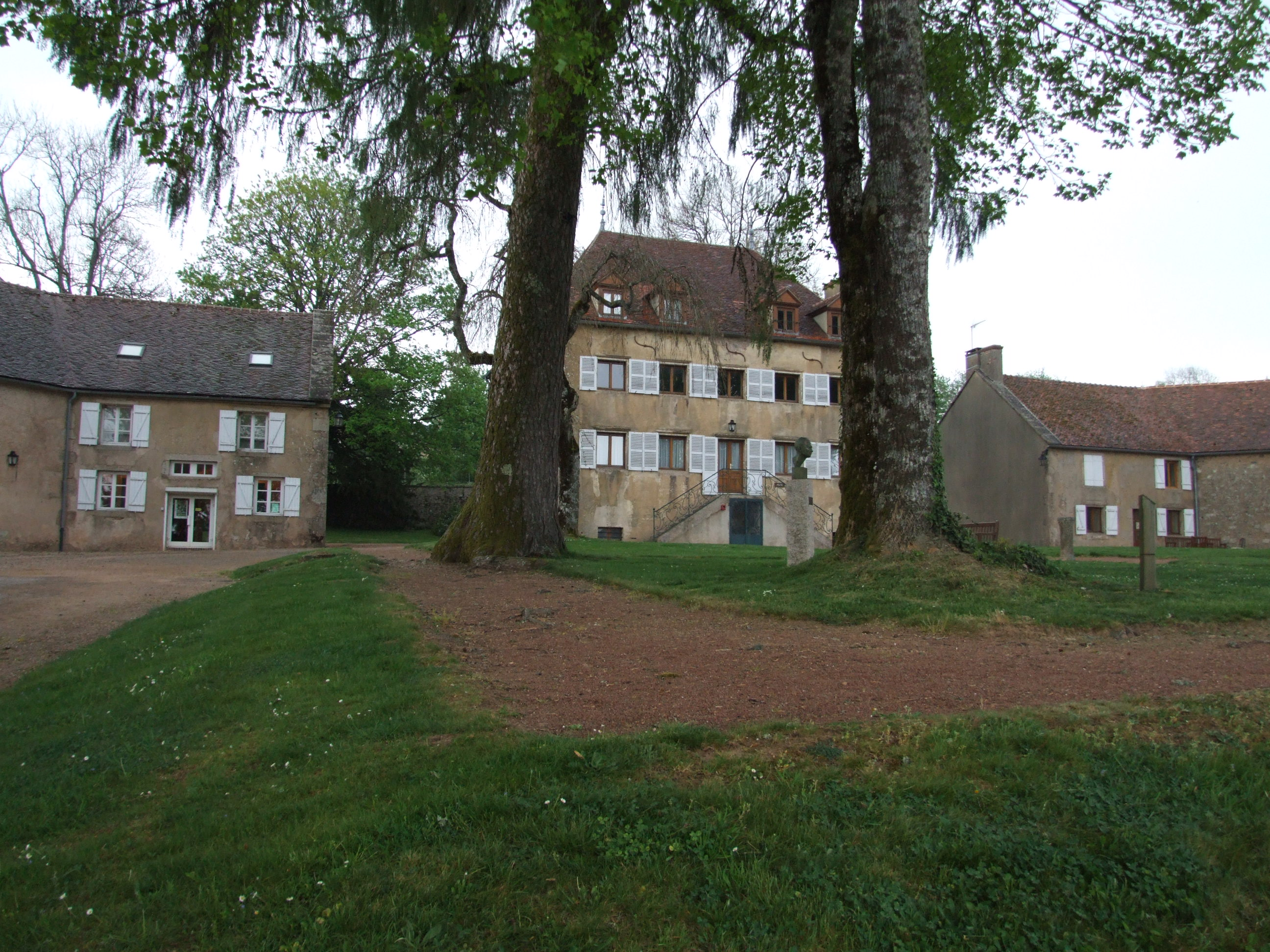
The visitors center is dubbed Espace St-Brisson

The maison du parc (main visitors center) is located in the small commune of Saint-Brisson. It maintains one of the park's six natural history museums (Écomusée de Morvan).

== Dark sky reserve ==
In 2025, DarkSky International designated Morvan Regional Natural Park as an International Dark Sky Reserve. Morvan Regional Natural Park, along with Millevaches Regional Natural Park, has some of the darkest night skies in continental France.

== Member communes ==
The park includes 117 communes as well as five associated partner communes.

- Aisy-sous-Thil • Alligny-en-Morvan • Anost • Antully • Arleuf • Arnay-le-Duc • Asquins • Autun • Avallon
- Bard-le-Régulier • Bazoches • Beauvilliers • Blanot • Blismes • Brassy • Brazey-en-Morvan • Bussières
- Cervon • Chalaux • Champeau-en-Morvan • Chastellux-sur-Cure • Château-Chinon (Campagne) • Château-Chinon (Ville) • Châtillon-en-Bazois • Châtin • Chaumard • Chissey-en-Morvan • Corancy • Cussy-en-Morvan
- Domecy-sur-Cure • Dommartin • Dompierre-en-Morvan • Dun-les-Places • Dun-sur-Grandry
- Étang-sur-Arroux
- Fâchin • Foissy-lès-Vézelay • Fontenay-près-Vézelay
- Gâcogne • Gien-sur-Cure • Glux-en-Glenne • Gouloux
- Island
- Juillenay
- La Celle-en-Morvan • La Comelle • La Grande-Verrière • La Motte-Ternant • La Petite-Verrière • La Roche-en-Brenil • Lacour-d'Arcenay • Larochemillay • Lavault-de-Frétoy • Liernais • Lormes • Lucenay-l'Évêque • Luzy
- Magny • Marigny-l'Église • Ménessaire • Mhère • Millay • Molphey • Montigny-en-Morvan • Montigny-Saint-Barthélemy • Montlay-en-Auxois • Montreuillon • Montsauche-les-Settons • Moulins-Engilbert • Moux-en-Morvan
- Onlay • Ouroux-en-Morvan
- Pierre-Perthuis • Planchez • Poil • Pontaubert • Pouques-Lormes • Précy-sous-Thil • Préporché
- Quarré-les-Tombes
- Roussillon-en-Morvan • Rouvray
- Saint-Agnan • Saint-Andeux • Saint-André-en-Morvan • Saint-Brisson • Saint-Didier • Saint-Didier-sur-Arroux • Saint-Germain-de-Modéon • Saint-Germain-des-Champs • Saint-Hilaire-en-Morvan • Saint-Honoré-les-Bains • Saint-Léger-de-Fougeret • Saint-Léger-sous-Beuvray • Saint-Léger-Vauban • Saint-Martin-de-la-Mer • Saint-Martin-du-Puy • Saint-Père • Saint-Péreuse • Saint-Prix-lès-Arnay • Sainte-Magnance • Saulieu • Savilly • Sermages • Sincey-lès-Rouvray • Sommant
- Tharoiseau • Thil-sur-Arroux • Thoisy-la-Berchère
- Uchon
- Vauclaix • Vézelay • Vianges • Vic-sous-Thil • Villapourçon • Villargoix • Villiers-en-Morvan

=== Partner communes ===
- Arnay-le-Duc • Autun • Corbigny • Châtillon-en-Bazois • Saint-Brancher

== See also ==
- Herbularium du Morvan
- List of regional natural parks of France

== Sources ==
"Parc naturel régional du Morvan" (in French). Fédération des Parcs naturels régionaux de France.
