= Thoisy =

Thoisy may refer to:

== People ==
- Geoffroy de Thoisy, Burgundian naval commander involved in Philip the Good’s Crusade endeavors in the 1440s.
- Noël Patrocles de Thoisy (died 1671), early governor general of the French Antilles

== Places ==
- Thoisy-la-Berchère, commune in the Côte-d'Or department in eastern France
- Thoisy-le-Désert commune in the Côte-d'Or department in eastern France
