= Villargoix =

- Commune
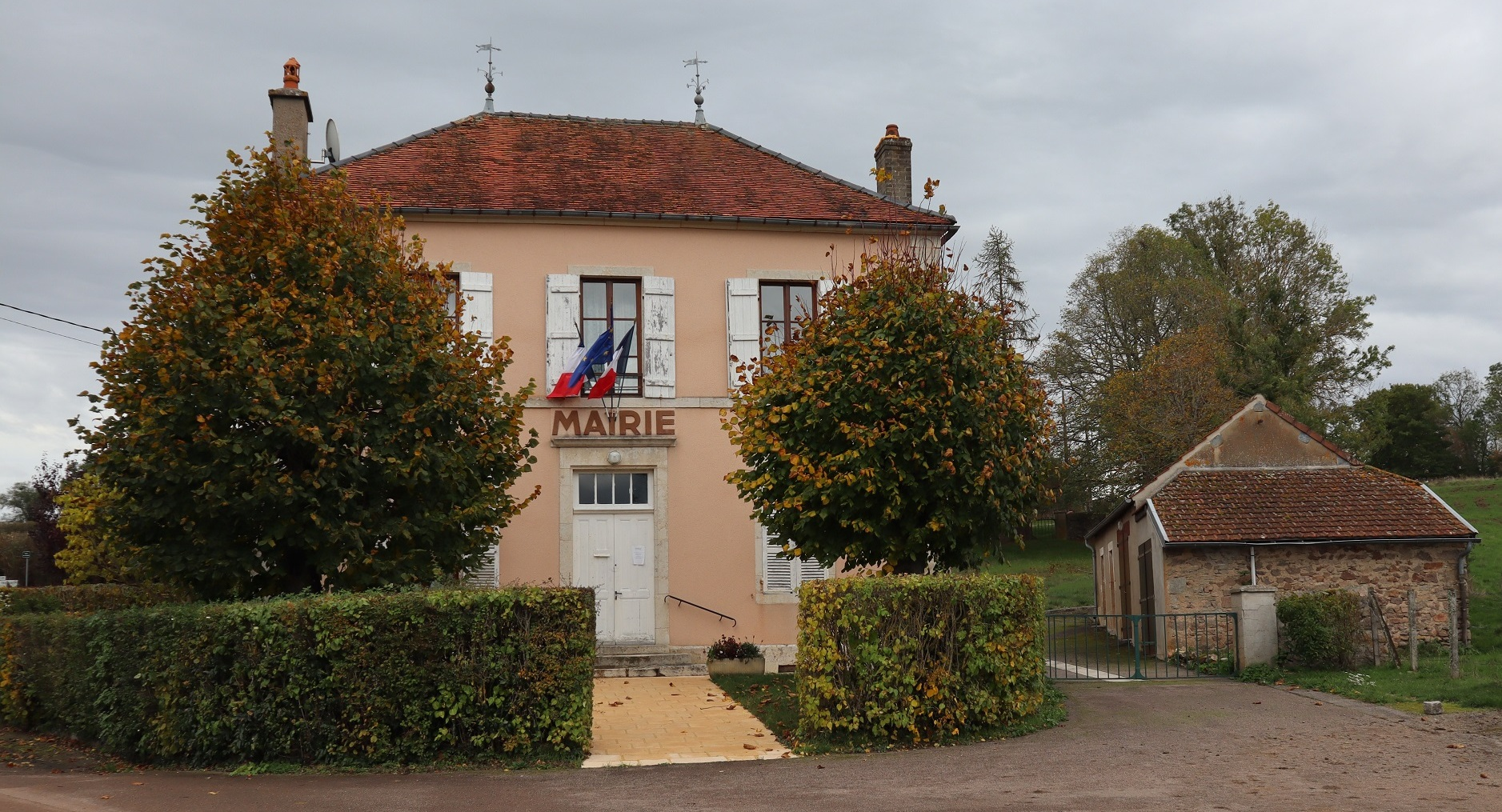
- Town hall
- Location of Villargoix
- Location within France Location within Bourgogne-Franche-Comté
- Coordinates: 47°17′38″N 4°17′36″E
- Country: France
- Region: Bourgogne-Franche-Comté
- Department: Côte-d'Or
- Arrondissement: Montbard
- Canton: Semur-en-Auxois
- Intercommunality: CC Saulieu-Morvan

Government
  - Mayor (2020–2026): Bernard Tursin
- Area^{1}: 17.45 km^{2} (6.74 sq mi)
- Elevation: 403 m (1,322 ft)
- Highest elevation: 486 m (1,594 ft)
- Lowest elevation: 351 m (1,152 ft)
- Population (2023): 147
  - Density: 8.42/km^{2} (21.8/sq mi)
- Time zone: UTC+01:00 (CET)
  - Summer (DST): UTC+02:00 (CEST)
- INSEE/Postal code: 21687 /21210
- ^{1} French Land Register data, which excludes lakes, ponds, glaciers > 1 km^{2} (0.386 sq mi or 247 acres) and river estuaries.

Villargoix (French pronunciation: [vilaʁɡwa]) is a commune in the Côte-d'Or department in eastern France.

== Population ==
Historical population
Year	Pop.	±% p.a.
1968	226	—
1975	187	−2.67%
1982	171	−1.27%
1990	177	+0.43%
1999	173	−0.25%
2007	171	−0.15%
2012	156	−1.82%
2017	143	−1.73%
2023	147	+0.46%
Source: INSEE

== See also ==
- Communes of the Côte-d'Or department
- Parc naturel régional du Morvan
