= Précy-sous-Thil =

- Commune
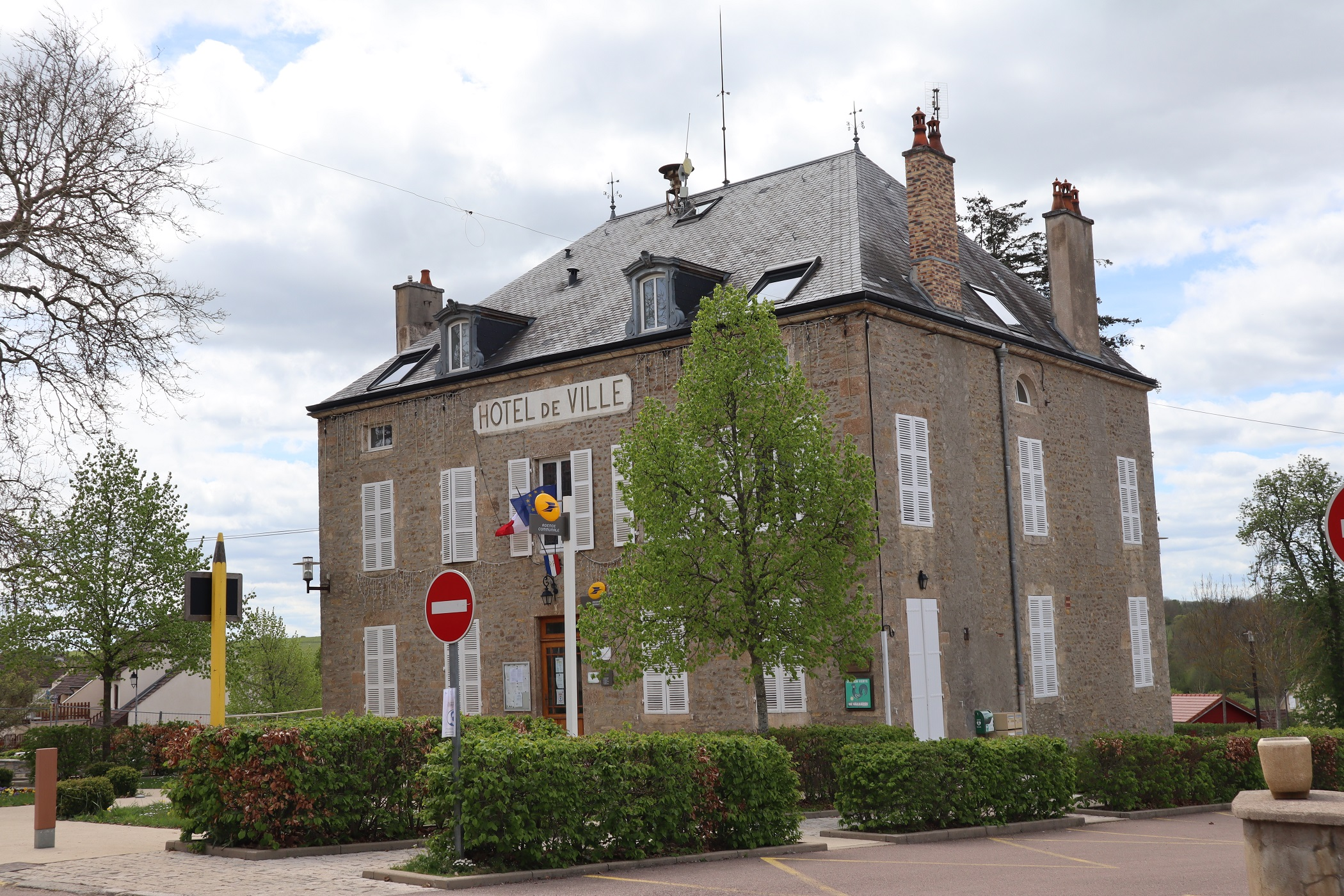
- Town hall

- Coat of arms
- Location of Précy-sous-Thil
- Location within France Location within Bourgogne-Franche-Comté
- Coordinates: 47°23′14″N 4°18′47″E
- Country: France
- Region: Bourgogne-Franche-Comté
- Department: Côte-d'Or
- Arrondissement: Montbard
- Canton: Semur-en-Auxois

Government
  - Mayor (2020–2026): Martine Eap-Dupin
- Area^{1}: 8.63 km^{2} (3.33 sq mi)
- Elevation: 322 m (1,056 ft)
- Highest elevation: 372 m (1,220 ft)
- Lowest elevation: 312 m (1,024 ft)
- Population (2023): 719
  - Density: 83.3/km^{2} (216/sq mi)
- Time zone: UTC+01:00 (CET)
  - Summer (DST): UTC+02:00 (CEST)
- INSEE/Postal code: 21505 /21390
- ^{1} French Land Register data, which excludes lakes, ponds, glaciers > 1 km^{2} (0.386 sq mi or 247 acres) and river estuaries.

Précy-sous-Thil (French pronunciation: [pʁesi su til], literally Précy under Thil) is a commune in the Côte-d'Or department in eastern France.

== Population ==
Historical population
Year	Pop.	±% p.a.
1968	583	—
1975	535	−1.22%
1982	592	+1.46%
1990	603	+0.23%
1999	708	+1.80%
2007	758	+0.86%
2012	775	+0.44%
2017	714	−1.63%
2023	719	+0.12%
Source: INSEE

== See also ==
- Communes of the Côte-d'Or department
- Parc naturel régional du Morvan
