= Savilly =

- Commune
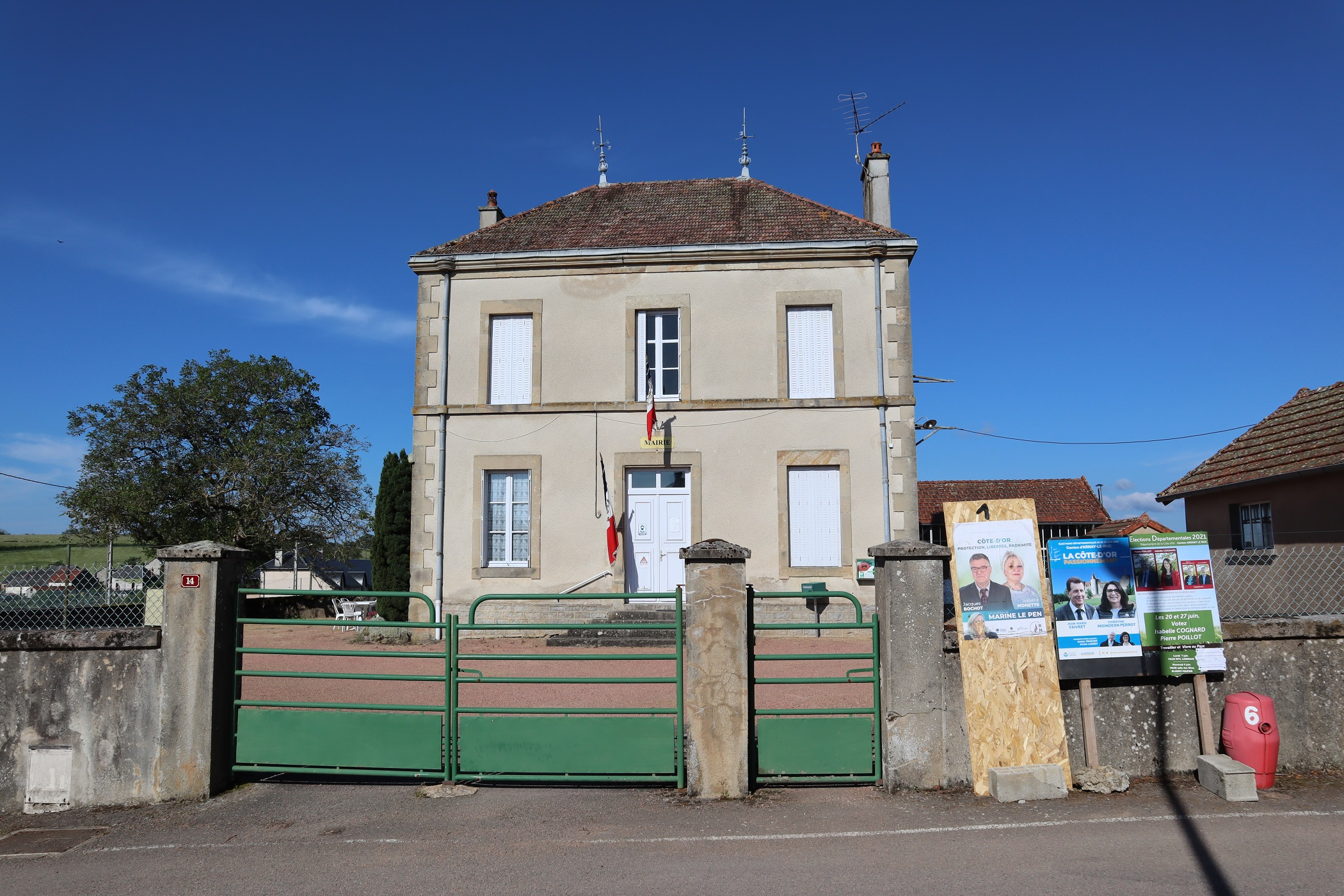
- Town hall
- Location of Savilly
- Location within France Location within Bourgogne-Franche-Comté
- Coordinates: 47°07′37″N 4°16′51″E
- Country: France
- Region: Bourgogne-Franche-Comté
- Department: Côte-d'Or
- Arrondissement: Beaune
- Canton: Arnay-le-Duc

Government
  - Mayor (2020–2026): Gilbert Flacelière
- Area^{1}: 8.31 km^{2} (3.21 sq mi)
- Elevation: 525 m (1,722 ft)
- Highest elevation: 551 m (1,808 ft)
- Lowest elevation: 400 m (1,300 ft)
- Population (2023): 79
  - Density: 9.5/km^{2} (25/sq mi)
- Time zone: UTC+01:00 (CET)
  - Summer (DST): UTC+02:00 (CEST)
- INSEE/Postal code: 21593 /21430
- ^{1} French Land Register data, which excludes lakes, ponds, glaciers > 1 km^{2} (0.386 sq mi or 247 acres) and river estuaries.

Savilly is a commune in the Côte-d'Or department in eastern France.

== Population ==
Historical population
Year	Pop.	±% p.a.
1968	118	—
1975	110	−1.00%
1982	88	−3.14%
1990	69	−2.99%
1999	68	−0.16%
2007	76	+1.40%
2012	77	+0.26%
2017	80	+0.77%
2023	79	−0.21%
Source: INSEE

== See also ==
- Communes of the Côte-d'Or department
- Parc naturel régional du Morvan
