= Cussy-en-Morvan =

- Commune
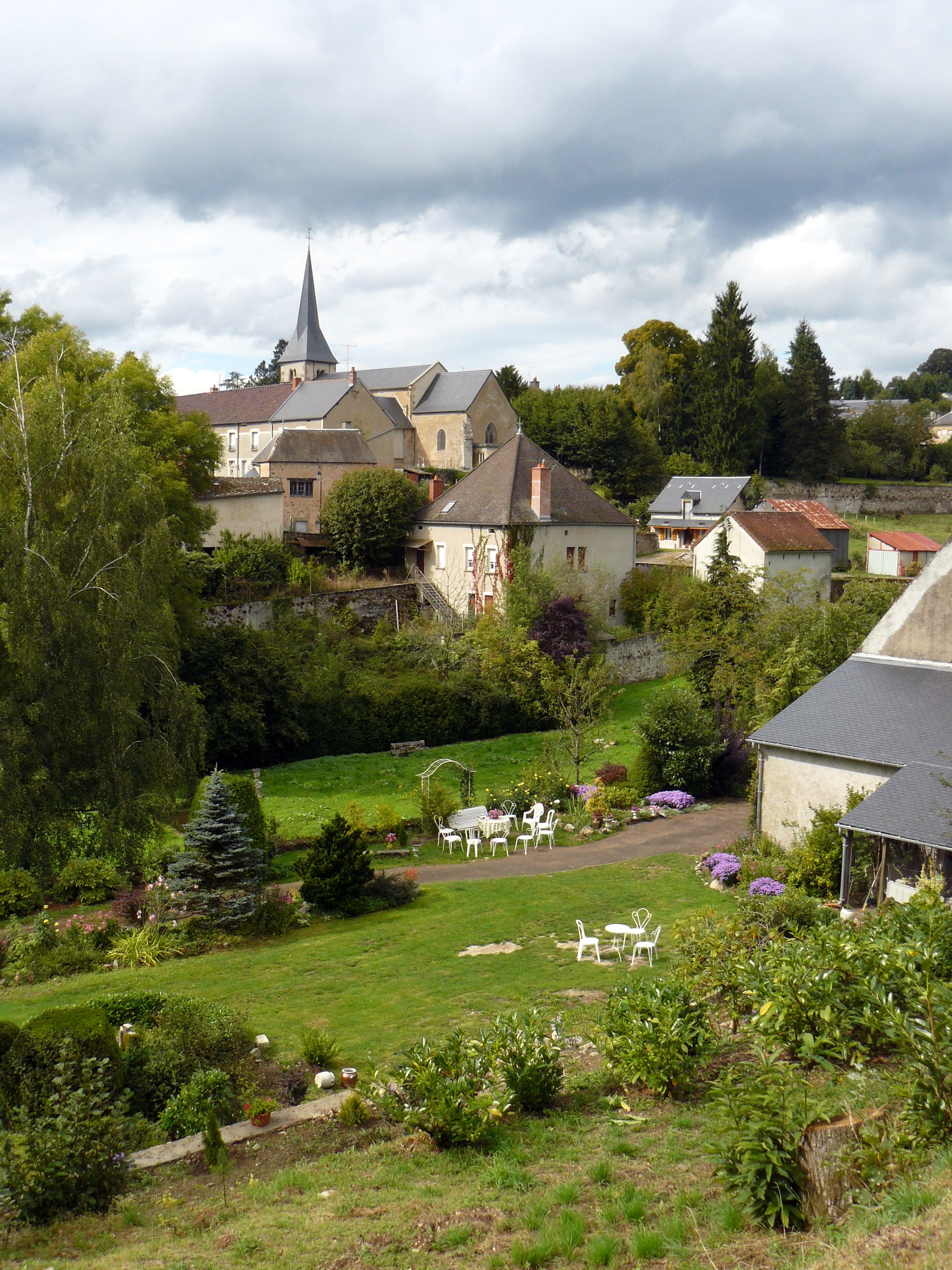
- A view of the church and village surroundings in Cussy-en-Morvan
- Location of Cussy-en-Morvan
- Location within France Location within Bourgogne-Franche-Comté
- Coordinates: 47°05′25″N 4°09′51″E
- Country: France
- Region: Bourgogne-Franche-Comté
- Department: Saône-et-Loire
- Arrondissement: Autun
- Canton: Autun-1
- Intercommunality: CC du Grand Autunois Morvan

Government
  - Mayor (2020–2026): Norbert Estienne
- Area^{1}: 34.77 km^{2} (13.42 sq mi)
- Elevation: 485 m (1,591 ft)
- Highest elevation: 720 m (2,360 ft)
- Lowest elevation: 365 m (1,198 ft)
- Population (2023): 346
  - Density: 9.95/km^{2} (25.8/sq mi)
- Time zone: UTC+01:00 (CET)
  - Summer (DST): UTC+02:00 (CEST)
- INSEE/Postal code: 71165 /71550
- Website: www.cussy-en-morvan.fr
- ^{1} French Land Register data, which excludes lakes, ponds, glaciers > 1 km^{2} (0.386 sq mi or 247 acres) and river estuaries.

Cussy-en-Morvan (French pronunciation: [kysi ɑ̃ mɔʁvɑ̃]; lit. 'Cussy-in-Morvan'), commonly referred to simply as Cussy, is a rural commune in the Saône-et-Loire department in the Bourgogne-Franche-Comté region in central-east France.

It is located some 20 km (12 mi) northwest of Autun, in the heart of Morvan Regional Natural Park. As of 2023, the population of the commune was 346. It covers an area of 34.77 km^{2} (13.42 sq mi).

It is situated on the departmental border with both Nièvre and Côte-d'Or at Gien-sur-Cure and the Ménessaire exclave, respectively.

== History ==
Georges Leyton (code name Socrate), "one of the most popular leaders of the Resistance of the Morvan" in World War II, was buried in the local cemetery in Cussy-en-Morvan on 12 August 1944, after being shot by German occupying forces near the nearby village of La Celle-en-Morvan.

== See also ==
- Communes of the Saône-et-Loire department
- Morvan Regional Natural Park
