= Saint-Didier, Côte-d'Or =

Saint-Didier
- Commune
- Location of Saint-Didier
- Location within France Location within Bourgogne-Franche-Comté
- Coordinates: 47°19′50″N 4°11′01″E
- Country: France
- Region: Bourgogne-Franche-Comté
- Department: Côte-d'Or
- Arrondissement: Montbard
- Canton: Semur-en-Auxois
- Intercommunality: CC Saulieu-Morvan

Government
  - Mayor (2020–2026): Didier Dupuis
- Area^{1}: 21.14 km^{2} (8.16 sq mi)
- Elevation: 506 m (1,660 ft)
- Highest elevation: 617 m (2,024 ft)
- Lowest elevation: 420 m (1,380 ft)
- Population (2023): 196
  - Density: 9.27/km^{2} (24.0/sq mi)
- Time zone: UTC+01:00 (CET)
  - Summer (DST): UTC+02:00 (CEST)
- INSEE/Postal code: 21546 /21210
- ^{1} French Land Register data, which excludes lakes, ponds, glaciers > 1 km^{2} (0.386 sq mi or 247 acres) and river estuaries.

Saint-Didier (French pronunciation: [sɛ̃ didje]) is a commune in the Côte-d'Or department in eastern France.

== Population ==
Historical population
| Year | Pop. | ±% p.a. |
|---|---|---|
| 1968 | 257 | — |
| 1975 | 204 | −3.25% |
| 1982 | 205 | +0.07% |
| 1990 | 174 | −2.03% |
| 1999 | 194 | +1.22% |
| 2007 | 206 | +0.75% |
| 2012 | 215 | +0.86% |
| 2017 | 207 | −0.76% |
| 2023 | 196 | −0.91% |
Source: INSEE

== See also ==
- Communes of the Côte-d'Or department
- Parc naturel régional du Morvan
