= Saint-Brisson =

- Commune
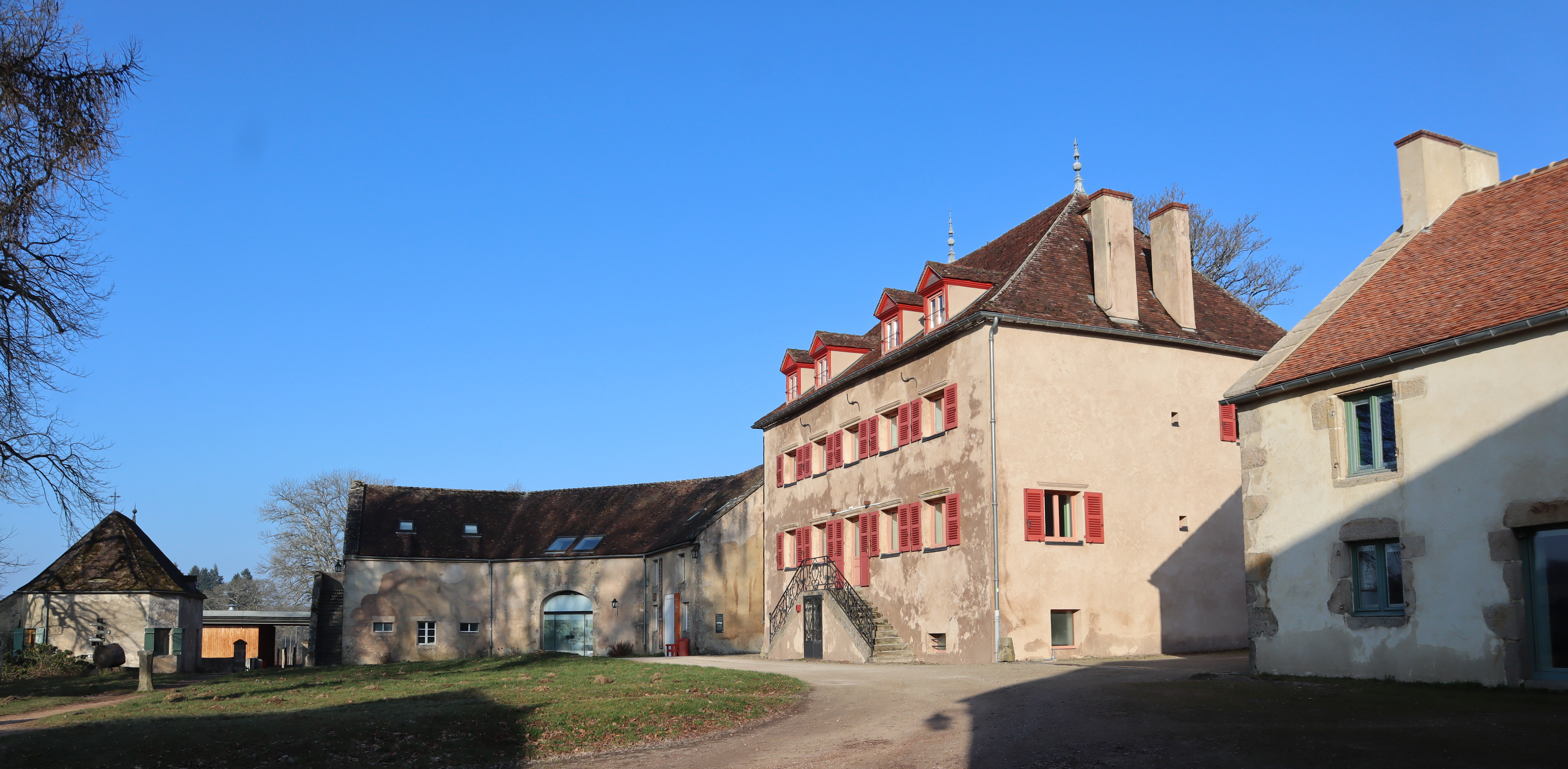
- The Maison du Parc naturel régional du Morvan, with the Musée de la Résistance en Morvan to the left
- Location of Saint-Brisson
- Location within France Location within Bourgogne-Franche-Comté
- Coordinates: 47°16′19″N 4°05′30″E
- Country: France
- Region: Bourgogne-Franche-Comté
- Department: Nièvre
- Arrondissement: Château-Chinon (Ville)
- Canton: Château-Chinon
- Intercommunality: CC Morvan Sommets et Grands Lacs

Government
  - Mayor (2020–2026): Michel Gobillon
- Area^{1}: 29.82 km^{2} (11.51 sq mi)
- Highest elevation: 698 m (2,290 ft)
- Lowest elevation: 453 m (1,486 ft)
- Population (2023): 252
  - Density: 8.45/km^{2} (21.9/sq mi)
- Demonym: Beursonniers
- Time zone: UTC+01:00 (CET)
  - Summer (DST): UTC+02:00 (CEST)
- INSEE/Postal code: 58235 /58230
- ^{1} French Land Register data, which excludes lakes, ponds, glaciers > 1 km^{2} (0.386 sq mi or 247 acres) and river estuaries.

Saint-Brisson (French pronunciation: [sɛ̃ bʁisɔ̃]) is a rural commune in the Nièvre department in central France. It is within Morvan Regional Natural Park, on the departmental border with Côte-d'Or.

== History ==
On 26 June 1983, Saint-Brisson was visited by President François Mitterrand, who was present for the official opening of the Musée de la Résistance en Morvan.

== Points of interest ==
- Maison du Parc naturel régional du Morvan
- Musée de la Résistance en Morvan
- Herbularium du Morvan

== See also ==
- Communes of the Nièvre department
- Morvan Regional Natural Park
