= Saint-Prix-lès-Arnay =

- Commune
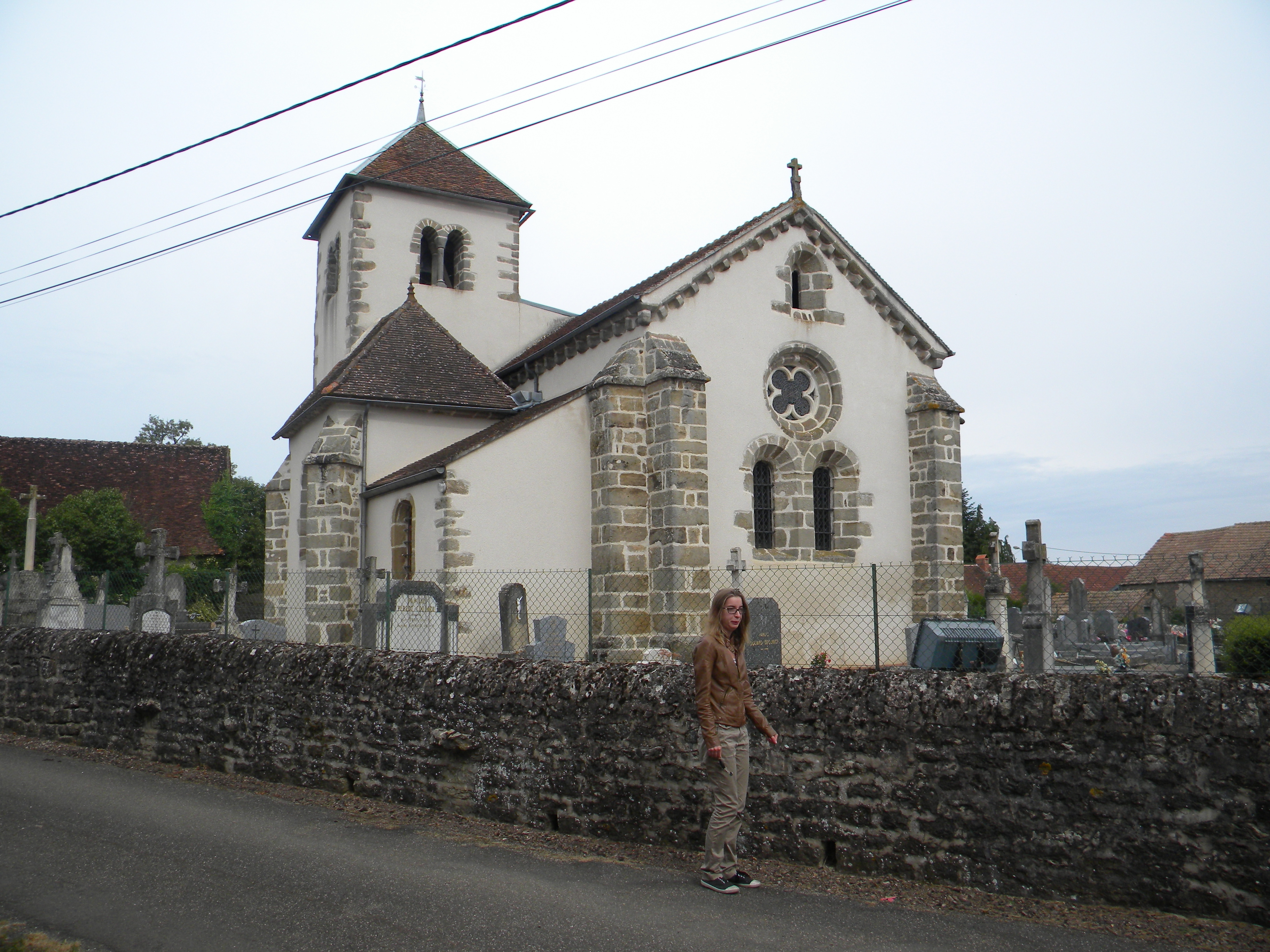
- The church in Saint-Prix-lès-Arnay

- Coat of arms
- Location of Saint-Prix-lès-Arnay
- Location within France Location within Bourgogne-Franche-Comté
- Coordinates: 47°07′00″N 4°29′50″E
- Country: France
- Region: Bourgogne-Franche-Comté
- Department: Côte-d'Or
- Arrondissement: Beaune
- Canton: Arnay-le-Duc

Government
  - Mayor (2020–2026): Pascal Lhernault
- Area^{1}: 11.29 km^{2} (4.36 sq mi)
- Elevation: 400 m (1,300 ft)
- Highest elevation: 433 m (1,421 ft)
- Lowest elevation: 348 m (1,142 ft)
- Population (2023): 203
  - Density: 18.0/km^{2} (46.6/sq mi)
- Time zone: UTC+01:00 (CET)
  - Summer (DST): UTC+02:00 (CEST)
- INSEE/Postal code: 21567 /21230
- ^{1} French Land Register data, which excludes lakes, ponds, glaciers > 1 km^{2} (0.386 sq mi or 247 acres) and river estuaries.

Saint-Prix-lès-Arnay (French pronunciation: [sɛ̃ pʁi lɛ.z‿aʁnɛ], literally Saint-Prix near Arnay) is a commune in the Côte-d'Or department in eastern France.

== Population ==
Historical population
Year	Pop.	±% p.a.
1968	262	—
1975	260	−0.11%
1982	260	+0.00%
1990	236	−1.20%
1999	242	+0.28%
2007	246	+0.21%
2012	246	+0.00%
2017	227	−1.59%
2023	203	−1.85%
Source: INSEE

== See also ==
- Communes of the Côte-d'Or department
- Parc naturel régional du Morvan
