= Blanot, Côte-d'Or =

Blanot
- Commune
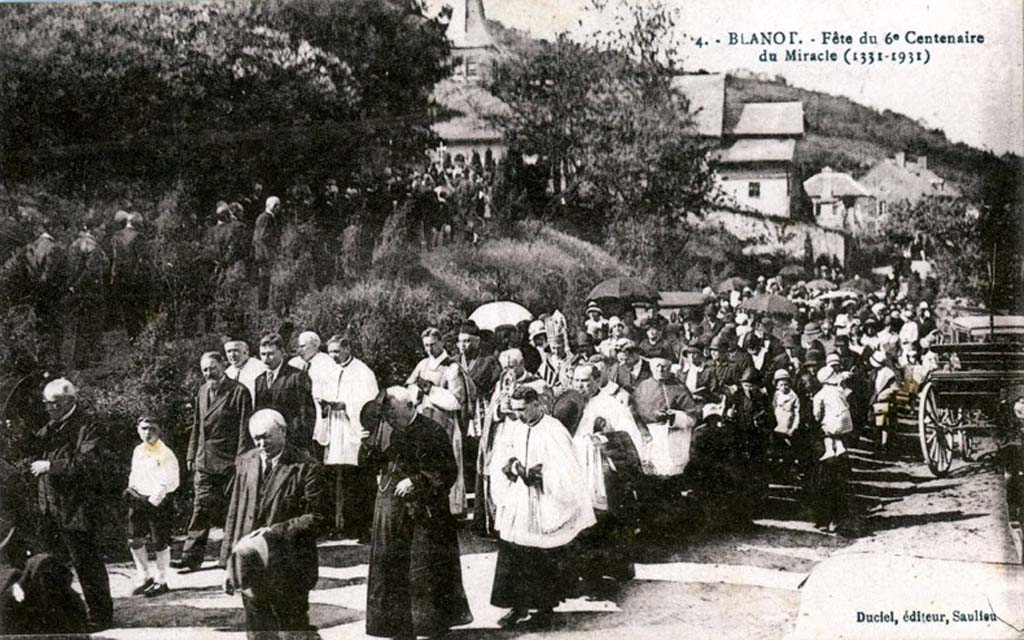
- A procession in Blanot in 1931
- Location of Blanot
- Location within France Location within Bourgogne-Franche-Comté
- Coordinates: 47°10′23″N 4°14′12″E
- Country: France
- Region: Bourgogne-Franche-Comté
- Department: Côte-d'Or
- Arrondissement: Beaune
- Canton: Arnay-le-Duc

Government
  - Mayor (2020–2026): Patrice Dormenil
- Area^{1}: 18.26 km^{2} (7.05 sq mi)
- Highest elevation: 581 m (1,906 ft)
- Lowest elevation: 384 m (1,260 ft)
- Population (2023): 120
  - Density: 6.6/km^{2} (17/sq mi)
- Time zone: UTC+01:00 (CET)
  - Summer (DST): UTC+02:00 (CEST)
- INSEE/Postal code: 21083 /21430
- ^{1} French Land Register data, which excludes lakes, ponds, glaciers > 1 km^{2} (0.386 sq mi or 247 acres) and river estuaries.

Blanot (French pronunciation: [blano]) is a commune in the Côte-d'Or department in eastern France.

== Population ==
Historical population
Year	Pop.	±% p.a.
1968	184	—
1975	158	−2.15%
1982	154	−0.37%
1990	155	+0.08%
1999	148	−0.51%
2007	132	−1.42%
2012	128	−0.61%
2017	127	−0.16%
2023	120	−0.94%
Source: INSEE

== See also ==
- Communes of the Côte-d'Or department
- Parc naturel régional du Morvan
