= La Motte-Ternant =

- Commune
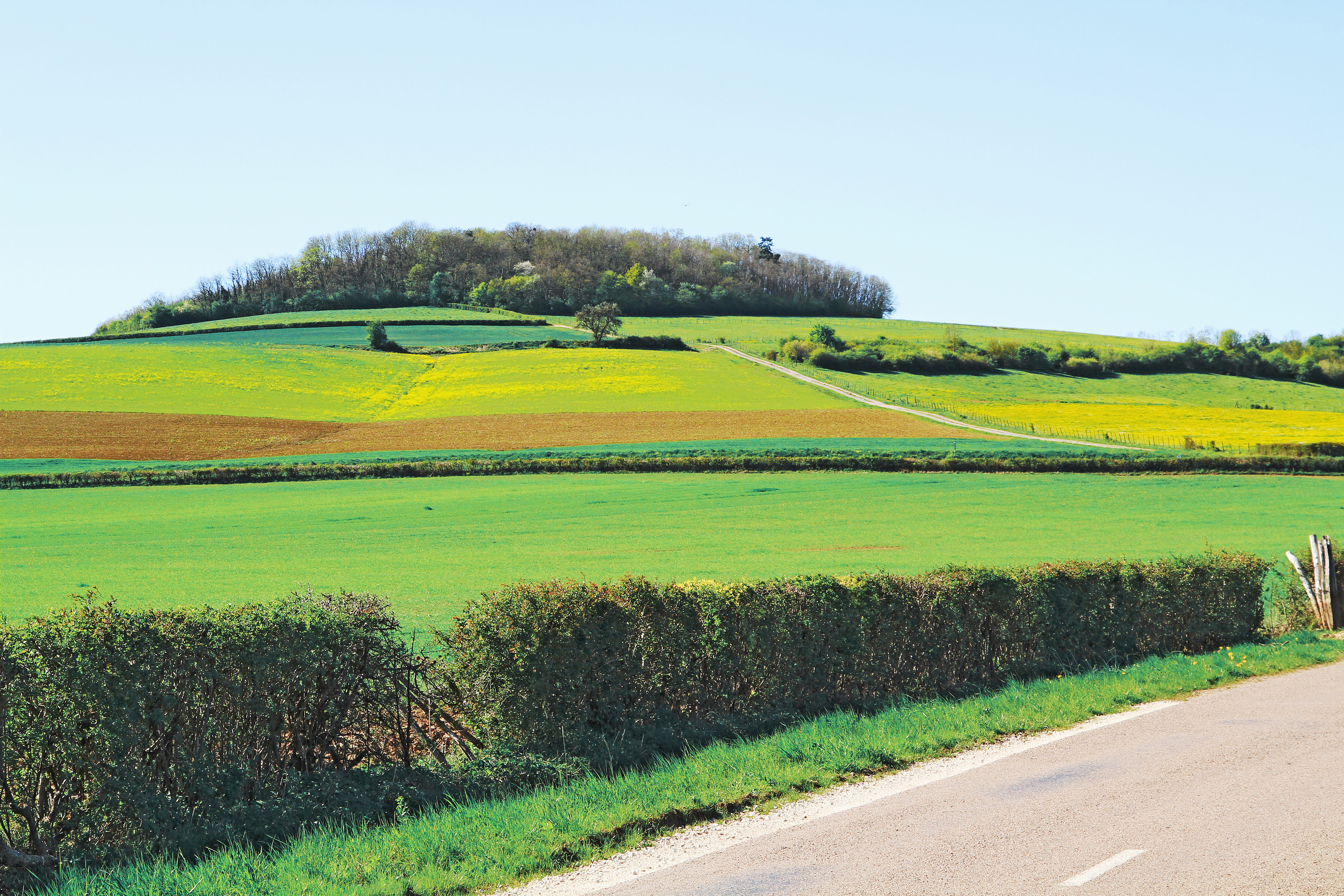
- The Mont-Rond
- Location of La Motte-Ternant
- Location within France Location within Bourgogne-Franche-Comté
- Coordinates: 47°19′30″N 4°20′00″E
- Country: France
- Region: Bourgogne-Franche-Comté
- Department: Côte-d'Or
- Arrondissement: Montbard
- Canton: Semur-en-Auxois
- Intercommunality: CC Saulieu-Morvan

Government
  - Mayor (2020–2026): Jean-Louis Petit
- Area^{1}: 21.32 km^{2} (8.23 sq mi)
- Elevation: 350 m (1,150 ft)
- Highest elevation: 476 m (1,562 ft)
- Lowest elevation: 333 m (1,093 ft)
- Population (2023): 148
  - Density: 6.94/km^{2} (18.0/sq mi)
- Time zone: UTC+01:00 (CET)
  - Summer (DST): UTC+02:00 (CEST)
- INSEE/Postal code: 21445 /21210
- ^{1} French Land Register data, which excludes lakes, ponds, glaciers > 1 km^{2} (0.386 sq mi or 247 acres) and river estuaries.

La Motte-Ternant (French pronunciation: [la mɔt tɛʁnɑ̃]) is a commune in the Côte-d'Or department in eastern France.

== Population ==
Historical population
Year	Pop.	±% p.a.
1968	215	—
1975	213	−0.13%
1982	191	−1.55%
1990	185	−0.40%
1999	163	−1.40%
2007	168	+0.38%
2012	170	+0.24%
2017	148	−2.73%
2023	148	+0.00%
Source: INSEE

== See also ==
- Communes of the Côte-d'Or department
- Parc naturel régional du Morvan
