= Montigny-Saint-Barthélemy =

- Commune
- Location of Montigny-Saint-Barthélemy
- Location within France Location within Bourgogne-Franche-Comté
- Coordinates: 47°25′30″N 4°16′14″E
- Country: France
- Region: Bourgogne-Franche-Comté
- Department: Côte-d'Or
- Arrondissement: Montbard
- Canton: Semur-en-Auxois

Government
  - Mayor (2020–2026): Françoise Voisenet
- Area^{1}: 6.2 km^{2} (2.4 sq mi)
- Highest elevation: 380 m (1,250 ft)
- Lowest elevation: 299 m (981 ft)
- Population (2023): 81
  - Density: 13/km^{2} (34/sq mi)
- Time zone: UTC+01:00 (CET)
  - Summer (DST): UTC+02:00 (CEST)
- INSEE/Postal code: 21430 /21390
- ^{1} French Land Register data, which excludes lakes, ponds, glaciers > 1 km^{2} (0.386 sq mi or 247 acres) and river estuaries.

Montigny-Saint-Barthélemy (French pronunciation: [mɔ̃tiɲi sɛ̃ baʁtelemi]) is a commune in the Côte-d'Or department in eastern France.

== Population ==
Historical population
Year	Pop.	±% p.a.
1968	66	—
1975	52	−3.35%
1982	63	+2.78%
1990	77	+2.54%
1999	71	−0.90%
2007	75	+0.69%
2012	84	+2.29%
2017	86	+0.47%
2023	81	−0.99%
Source: INSEE

== See also ==
- Communes of the Côte-d'Or department
- Parc naturel régional du Morvan
