= La Roche-en-Brenil =

- Commune
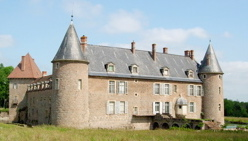
- The chateau in La Roche-en-Brenil

- Coat of arms
- Location of La Roche-en-Brenil
- Location within France Location within Bourgogne-Franche-Comté
- Coordinates: 47°23′18″N 4°10′44″E
- Country: France
- Region: Bourgogne-Franche-Comté
- Department: Côte-d'Or
- Arrondissement: Montbard
- Canton: Semur-en-Auxois
- Intercommunality: CC Saulieu-Morvan

Government
  - Mayor (2020–2026): Joël Soilly
- Area^{1}: 50.85 km^{2} (19.63 sq mi)
- Highest elevation: 573 m (1,880 ft)
- Lowest elevation: 273 m (896 ft)
- Population (2023): 911
  - Density: 17.9/km^{2} (46.4/sq mi)
- Time zone: UTC+01:00 (CET)
  - Summer (DST): UTC+02:00 (CEST)
- INSEE/Postal code: 21525 /21530
- ^{1} French Land Register data, which excludes lakes, ponds, glaciers > 1 km^{2} (0.386 sq mi or 247 acres) and river estuaries.

La Roche-en-Brenil (French pronunciation: [la ʁɔʃ ɑ̃ bʁənil]) is a commune in the Côte-d'Or department in eastern France.

== Population ==
Historical population
Year	Pop.	±% p.a.
1968	1,143	—
1975	1,082	−0.78%
1982	1,066	−0.21%
1990	890	−2.23%
1999	891	+0.01%
2007	926	+0.48%
2012	901	−0.55%
2017	869	−0.72%
2023	911	+0.79%
Source: INSEE

== See also ==
- Communes of the Côte-d'Or department
- Parc naturel régional du Morvan
