= Rouvray, Côte-d'Or =

Rouvray
- Commune
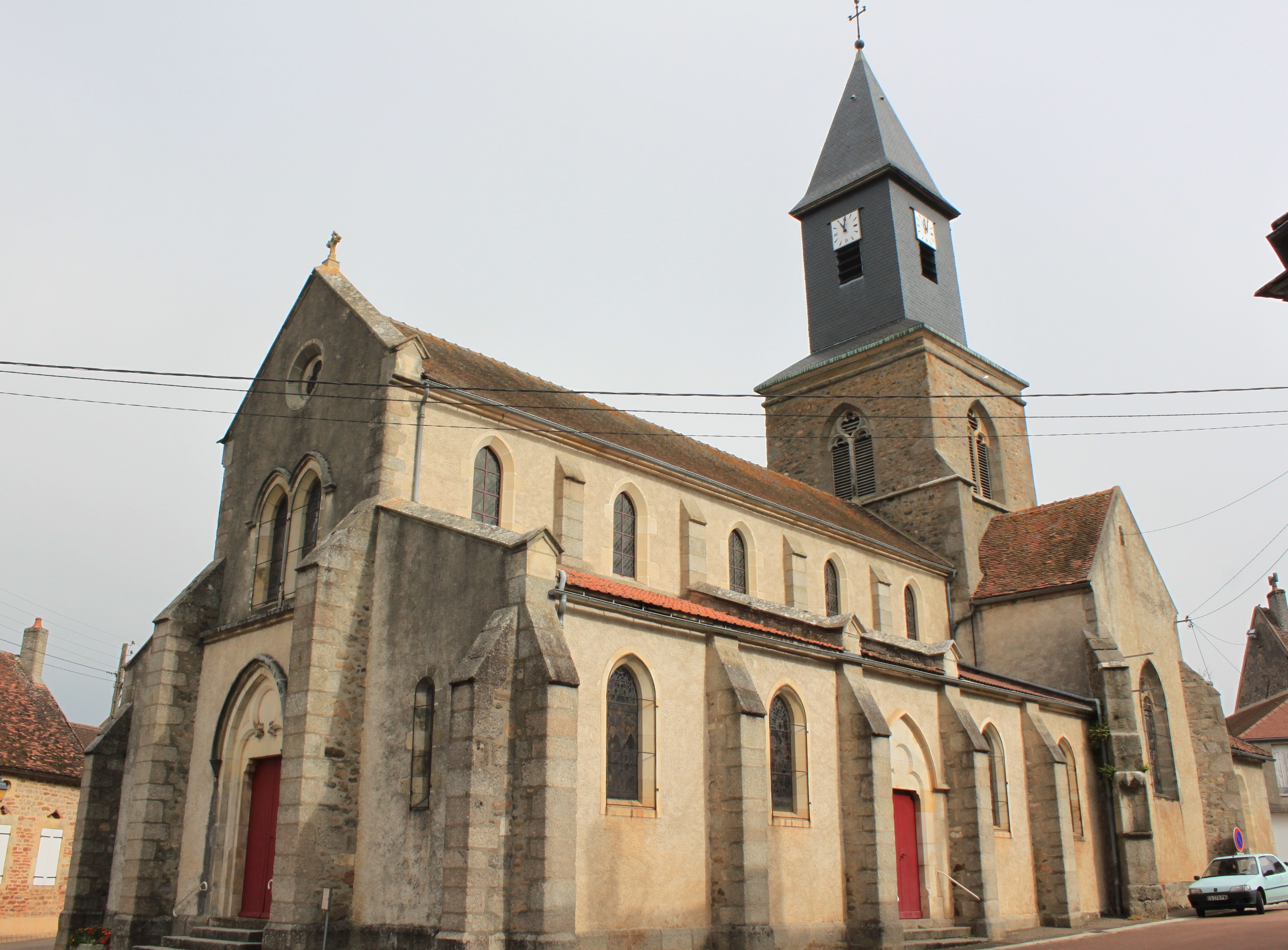
- The church in Rouvray

- Coat of arms
- Location of Rouvray
- Location within France Location within Bourgogne-Franche-Comté
- Coordinates: 47°25′31″N 4°06′16″E
- Country: France
- Region: Bourgogne-Franche-Comté
- Department: Côte-d'Or
- Arrondissement: Montbard
- Canton: Semur-en-Auxois
- Intercommunality: CC Saulieu-Morvan

Government
  - Mayor (2020–2026): Annie Marchandise
- Area^{1}: 9.48 km^{2} (3.66 sq mi)
- Highest elevation: 401 m (1,316 ft)
- Lowest elevation: 308 m (1,010 ft)
- Population (2023): 505
  - Density: 53.3/km^{2} (138/sq mi)
- Time zone: UTC+01:00 (CET)
  - Summer (DST): UTC+02:00 (CEST)
- INSEE/Postal code: 21531 /21530
- ^{1} French Land Register data, which excludes lakes, ponds, glaciers > 1 km^{2} (0.386 sq mi or 247 acres) and river estuaries.

Rouvray (French pronunciation: [ʁuvʁɛ]) is a commune in Côte-d'Or, a department in eastern France.

== Population ==
Historical population
Year	Pop.	±% p.a.
1968	576	—
1975	445	−3.62%
1982	555	+3.21%
1990	601	+1.00%
1999	580	−0.39%
2007	636	+1.16%
2012	586	−1.62%
2017	492	−3.44%
2023	505	+0.44%
Source: INSEE

== Environment ==
Rouvray lies within the Morvan Regional Natural Park.

== See also ==
- Communes of the Côte-d'Or department
- Parc naturel régional du Morvan
