= Molphey =

- Commune
- Location of Molphey
- Location within France Location within Bourgogne-Franche-Comté
- Coordinates: 47°20′42″N 4°12′41″E
- Country: France
- Region: Bourgogne-Franche-Comté
- Department: Côte-d'Or
- Arrondissement: Montbard
- Canton: Semur-en-Auxois
- Intercommunality: CC Saulieu-Morvan

Government
  - Mayor (2020–2026): Didier Pasquet
- Area^{1}: 7.58 km^{2} (2.93 sq mi)
- Elevation: 483 m (1,585 ft)
- Highest elevation: 529 m (1,736 ft)
- Lowest elevation: 395 m (1,296 ft)
- Population (2023): 132
  - Density: 17.4/km^{2} (45.1/sq mi)
- Time zone: UTC+01:00 (CET)
  - Summer (DST): UTC+02:00 (CEST)
- INSEE/Postal code: 21422 /21210
- ^{1} French Land Register data, which excludes lakes, ponds, glaciers > 1 km^{2} (0.386 sq mi or 247 acres) and river estuaries.

Molphey (French pronunciation: [mɔlfɛ]) is a commune in the Côte-d'Or department in eastern France.

== Population ==
Historical population
| Year | Pop. | ±% p.a. |
|---|---|---|
| 1968 | 132 | — |
| 1975 | 144 | +1.25% |
| 1982 | 124 | −2.11% |
| 1990 | 136 | +1.16% |
| 1999 | 139 | +0.24% |
| 2007 | 128 | −1.03% |
| 2012 | 148 | +2.95% |
| 2017 | 130 | −2.56% |
| 2023 | 132 | +0.25% |
Source: INSEE

== See also ==
- Communes of the Côte-d'Or department
- Parc naturel régional du Morvan
