= Anost =

- Commune
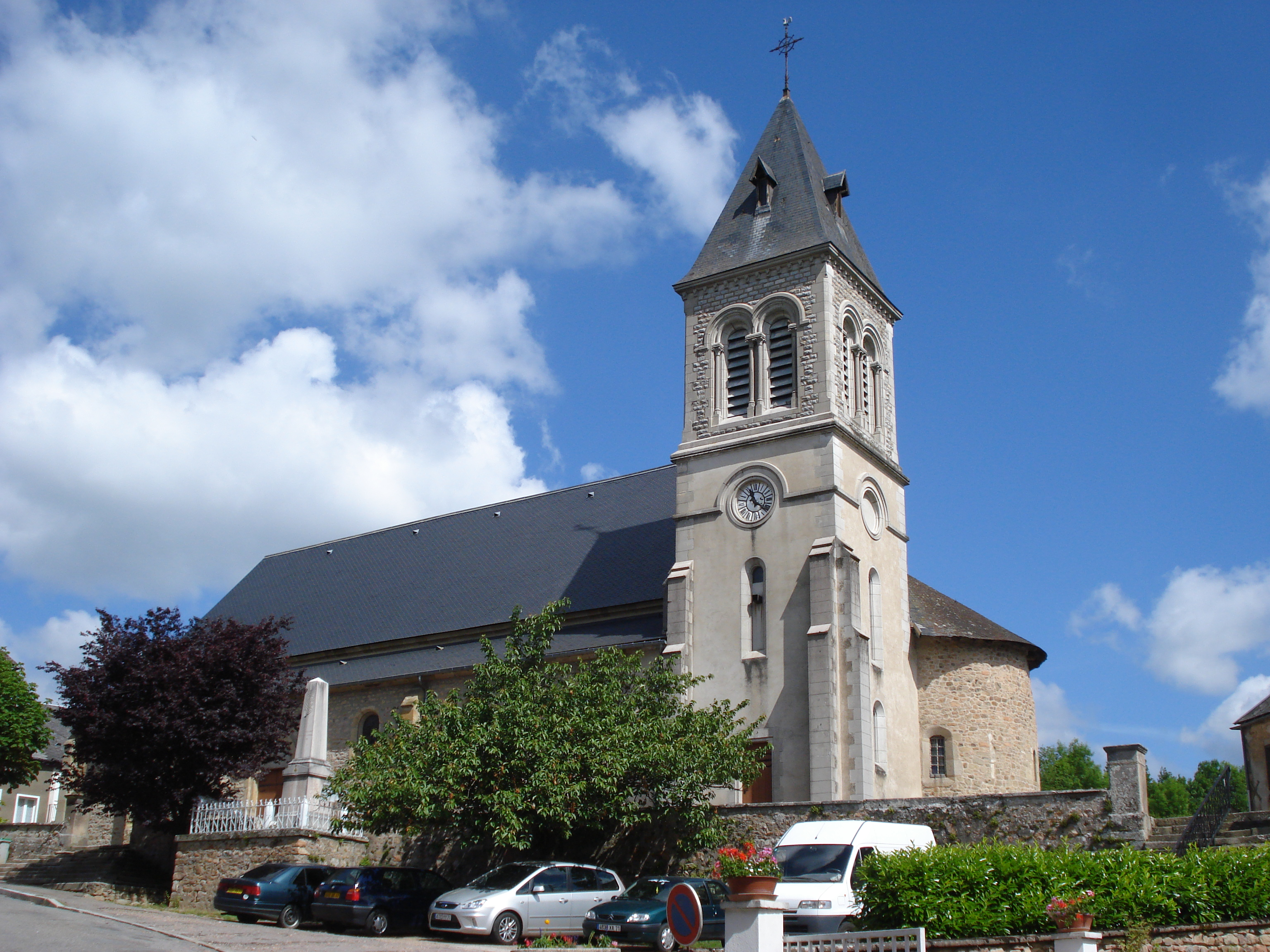
- Église Saint-Germain
- Location of Anost
- Location within France Location within Bourgogne-Franche-Comté
- Coordinates: 47°04′41″N 4°06′01″E
- Country: France
- Region: Bourgogne-Franche-Comté
- Department: Saône-et-Loire
- Arrondissement: Autun
- Canton: Autun-1
- Intercommunality: CC du Grand Autunois Morvan

Government
  - Mayor (2020–2026): Louis Basdevant
- Area^{1}: 51.91 km^{2} (20.04 sq mi)
- Elevation: 410 m (1,350 ft)
- Highest elevation: 785 m (2,575 ft)
- Lowest elevation: 357 m (1,171 ft)
- Population (2023): 695
  - Density: 13.4/km^{2} (34.7/sq mi)
- Demonym: Anostiens
- Time zone: UTC+01:00 (CET)
  - Summer (DST): UTC+02:00 (CEST)
- INSEE/Postal code: 71009 /71550
- Website: www.anost.fr
- ^{1} French Land Register data, which excludes lakes, ponds, glaciers > 1 km^{2} (0.386 sq mi or 247 acres) and river estuaries.

Anost (French pronunciation: [ano]) is a rural commune in the Saône-et-Loire department in the Bourgogne-Franche-Comté region in central-east France. It is located on the departmental border with Nièvre, northeast of the Haut-Folin summit and southwest of Ménessaire, a Côte-d'Or exclave.

== Geography ==
The commune lies in the northwestern part of Saône-et-Loire, northwest of the subprefecture Autun. It is part of the Morvan natural area, as well as Morvan Regional Natural Park.

== History ==
167 inhabitants of Anost were killed fighting in World War I.

Amid the Liberation of France in World War II in 1944, Anost was repeatedly attacked by the German occupying forces in retaliation for being a French Resistance Maquis hideout; several inhabitants were killed.

== Demographics ==
Historical population
| Year | Pop. | ±% p.a. |
|---|---|---|
| 1968 | 1,058 | — |
| 1975 | 867 | −2.80% |
| 1982 | 847 | −0.33% |
| 1990 | 746 | −1.57% |
| 1999 | 679 | −1.04% |
| 2007 | 678 | −0.02% |
| 2012 | 699 | +0.61% |
| 2017 | 730 | +0.87% |
| 2023 | 695 | −0.82% |
Source: INSEE

== See also ==
- Communes of the Saône-et-Loire department
- Morvan Regional Natural Park
