= Dompierre-en-Morvan =

- Commune
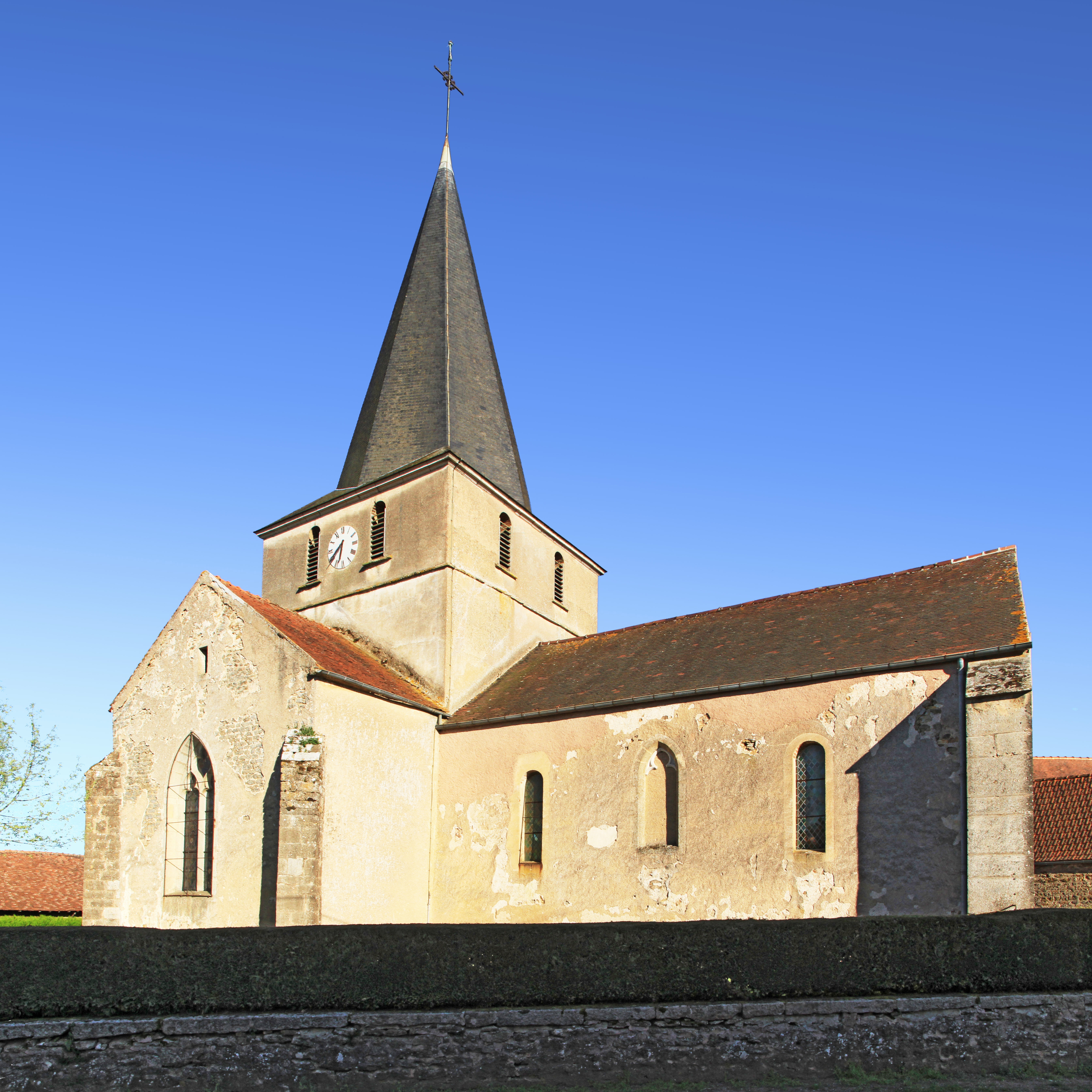
- The church in Dompierre-en-Morvan
- Location of Dompierre-en-Morvan
- Location within France Location within Bourgogne-Franche-Comté
- Coordinates: 47°23′43″N 4°14′04″E
- Country: France
- Region: Bourgogne-Franche-Comté
- Department: Côte-d'Or
- Arrondissement: Montbard
- Canton: Semur-en-Auxois

Government
  - Mayor (2020–2026): Michel Gaillardin
- Area^{1}: 15.01 km^{2} (5.80 sq mi)
- Elevation: 380 m (1,250 ft)
- Highest elevation: 438 m (1,437 ft)
- Lowest elevation: 323 m (1,060 ft)
- Population (2023): 201
  - Density: 13.4/km^{2} (34.7/sq mi)
- Time zone: UTC+01:00 (CET)
  - Summer (DST): UTC+02:00 (CEST)
- INSEE/Postal code: 21232 /21390
- ^{1} French Land Register data, which excludes lakes, ponds, glaciers > 1 km^{2} (0.386 sq mi or 247 acres) and river estuaries.

Dompierre-en-Morvan (French pronunciation: [dɔ̃pjɛʁ ɑ̃ mɔʁvɑ̃], lit. 'Dompierre in Morvan') is a commune in the Côte-d'Or department in eastern France.

== Population ==
Historical population
Year	Pop.	±% p.a.
1968	218	—
1975	204	−0.94%
1982	161	−3.33%
1990	163	+0.15%
1999	200	+2.30%
2007	213	+0.79%
2012	220	+0.65%
2017	211	−0.83%
2023	201	−0.81%
Source: INSEE

== See also ==
- Communes of the Côte-d'Or department
- Parc naturel régional du Morvan
