= Thoisy-la-Berchère =

- Commune
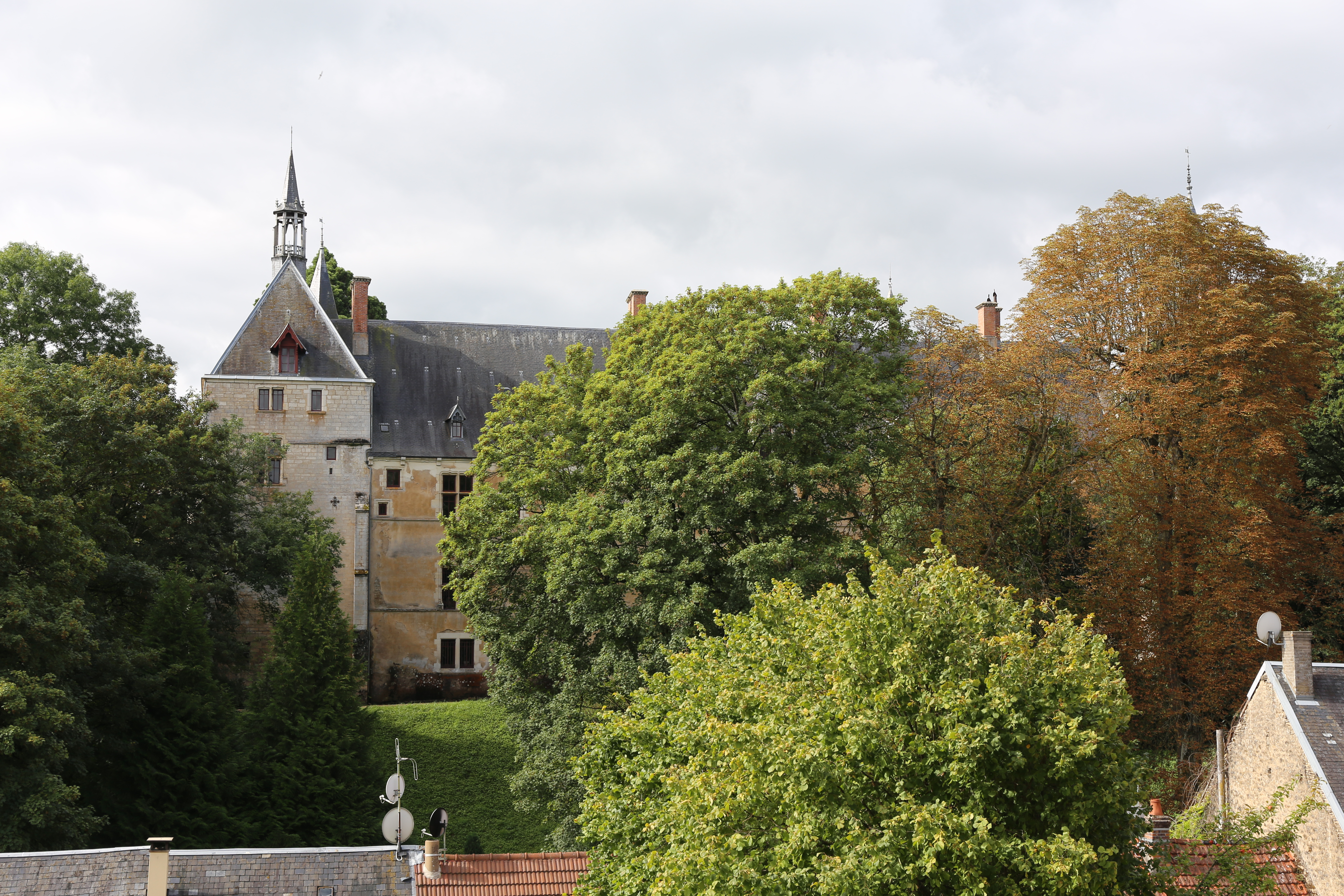
- Chateau

- Coat of arms
- Location of Thoisy-la-Berchère
- Location within France Location within Bourgogne-Franche-Comté
- Coordinates: 47°15′45″N 4°20′50″E
- Country: France
- Region: Bourgogne-Franche-Comté
- Department: Côte-d'Or
- Arrondissement: Montbard
- Canton: Semur-en-Auxois
- Intercommunality: CC Saulieu-Morvan

Government
  - Mayor (2020–2026): Jean-Marie Sivry
- Area^{1}: 34.74 km^{2} (13.41 sq mi)
- Elevation: 413 m (1,355 ft)
- Highest elevation: 512 m (1,680 ft)
- Lowest elevation: 355 m (1,165 ft)
- Population (2023): 302
  - Density: 8.69/km^{2} (22.5/sq mi)
- Time zone: UTC+01:00 (CET)
  - Summer (DST): UTC+02:00 (CEST)
- INSEE/Postal code: 21629 /21210
- ^{1} French Land Register data, which excludes lakes, ponds, glaciers > 1 km^{2} (0.386 sq mi or 247 acres) and river estuaries.

Thoisy-la-Berchère (French pronunciation: [twazi la bɛʁʃɛʁ]) is a commune in the Côte-d'Or department in eastern France.

== Population ==
Historical population
Year	Pop.	±% p.a.
1968	434	—
1975	365	−2.44%
1982	283	−3.57%
1990	253	−1.39%
1999	261	+0.35%
2007	296	+1.59%
2012	316	+1.32%
2017	309	−0.45%
2023	302	−0.38%
Source: INSEE

== See also ==
- Communes of the Côte-d'Or department
- Parc naturel régional du Morvan
