= Villiers-en-Morvan =

- Commune
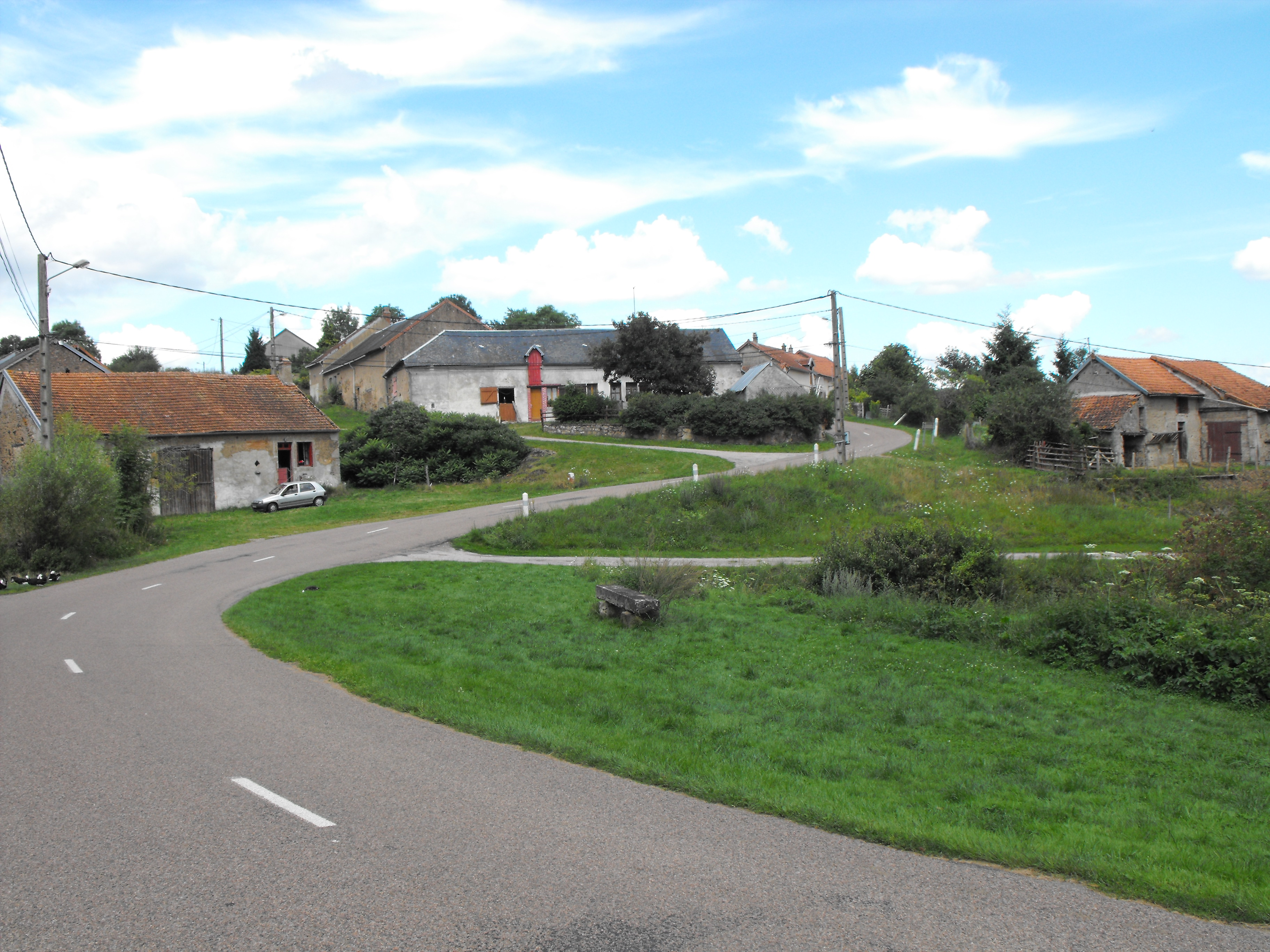
- A general view of Villiers-en-Morvan
- Location of Villiers-en-Morvan
- Location within France Location within Bourgogne-Franche-Comté
- Coordinates: 47°08′48″N 4°15′22″E
- Country: France
- Region: Bourgogne-Franche-Comté
- Department: Côte-d'Or
- Arrondissement: Beaune
- Canton: Arnay-le-Duc

Government
  - Mayor (2025–2026): Marie-Christine Hery
- Area^{1}: 6.7 km^{2} (2.6 sq mi)
- Elevation: 450 m (1,480 ft)
- Highest elevation: 527 m (1,729 ft)
- Lowest elevation: 377 m (1,237 ft)
- Population (2023): 43
  - Density: 6.4/km^{2} (17/sq mi)
- Time zone: UTC+01:00 (CET)
  - Summer (DST): UTC+02:00 (CEST)
- INSEE/Postal code: 21703 /21430
- ^{1} French Land Register data, which excludes lakes, ponds, glaciers > 1 km^{2} (0.386 sq mi or 247 acres) and river estuaries.

Villiers-en-Morvan (French pronunciation: [vilje ɑ̃ mɔʁvɑ̃]; lit. 'Villiers-in-Morvan') is a commune in the Côte-d'Or department in eastern France.

== Population ==
Historical population
Year	Pop.	±% p.a.
1968	80	—
1975	59	−4.26%
1982	51	−2.06%
1990	36	−4.26%
1999	48	+3.25%
2007	42	−1.66%
2012	44	+0.93%
2017	47	+1.33%
2023	43	−1.47%
Source: INSEE

== See also ==
- Communes of the Côte-d'Or department
- Parc naturel régional du Morvan
