= Vianges =

- Commune
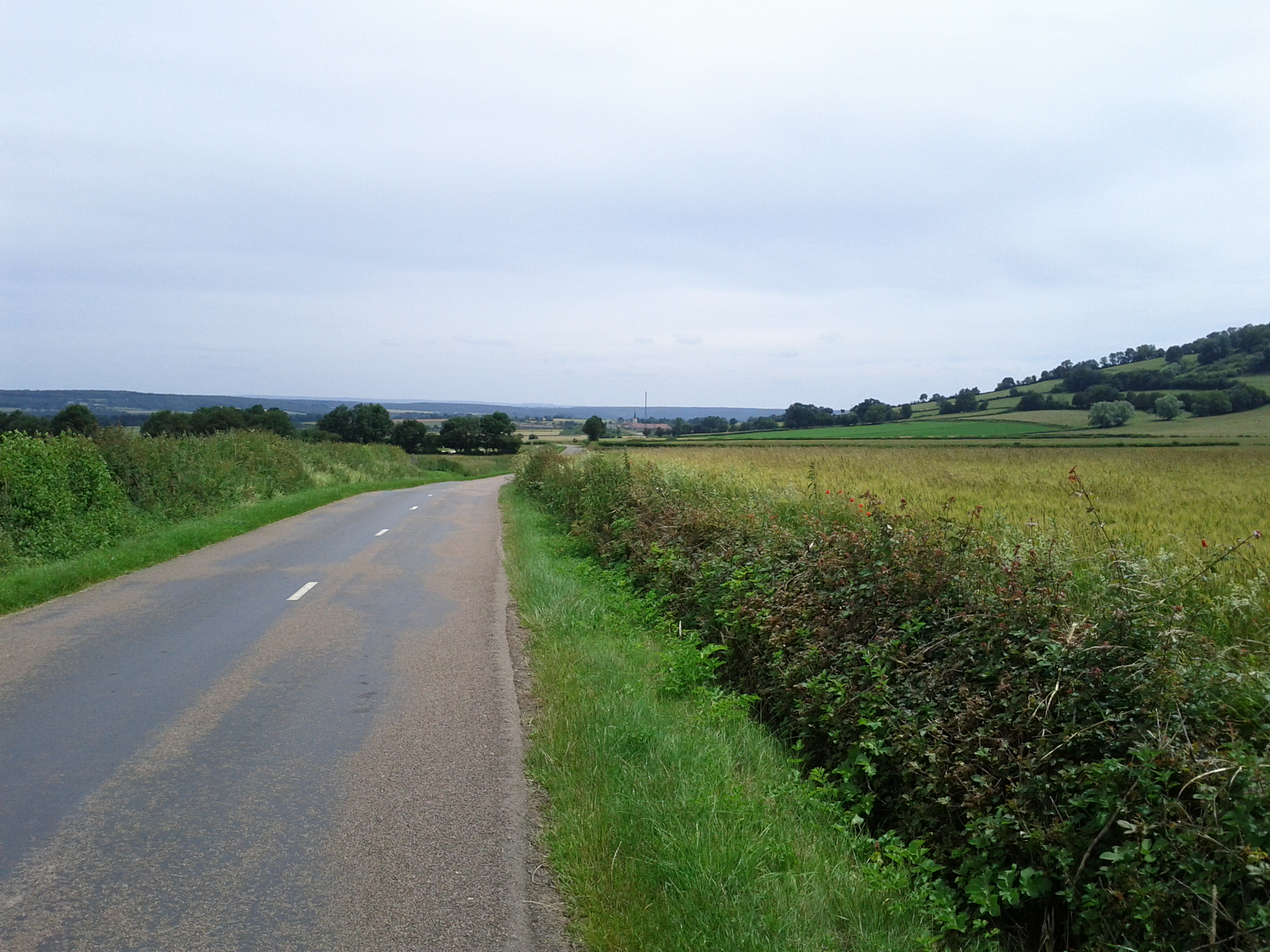
- The road and landscape in Vianges
- Location of Vianges
- Location within France Location within Bourgogne-Franche-Comté
- Coordinates: 47°09′42″N 4°19′32″E
- Country: France
- Region: Bourgogne-Franche-Comté
- Department: Côte-d'Or
- Arrondissement: Beaune
- Canton: Arnay-le-Duc

Government
  - Mayor (2020–2026): Pierre Poillot
- Area^{1}: 8.81 km^{2} (3.40 sq mi)
- Elevation: 430 m (1,410 ft)
- Highest elevation: 492 m (1,614 ft)
- Lowest elevation: 351 m (1,152 ft)
- Population (2023): 35
  - Density: 4.0/km^{2} (10/sq mi)
- Time zone: UTC+01:00 (CET)
  - Summer (DST): UTC+02:00 (CEST)
- INSEE/Postal code: 21675 /21430
- ^{1} French Land Register data, which excludes lakes, ponds, glaciers > 1 km^{2} (0.386 sq mi or 247 acres) and river estuaries.

Vianges (French pronunciation: [vjɑ̃ʒ]) is a commune in the Côte-d'Or department in eastern France.

== Population ==
Historical population
Year	Pop.	±% p.a.
1968	105	—
1975	81	−3.64%
1982	65	−3.09%
1990	50	−3.23%
1999	61	+2.23%
2007	79	+3.28%
2012	59	−5.67%
2017	40	−7.48%
2023	35	−2.20%
Source: INSEE

== See also ==
- Communes of the Côte-d'Or department
- Parc naturel régional du Morvan
