= Alligny-en-Morvan =

- Commune
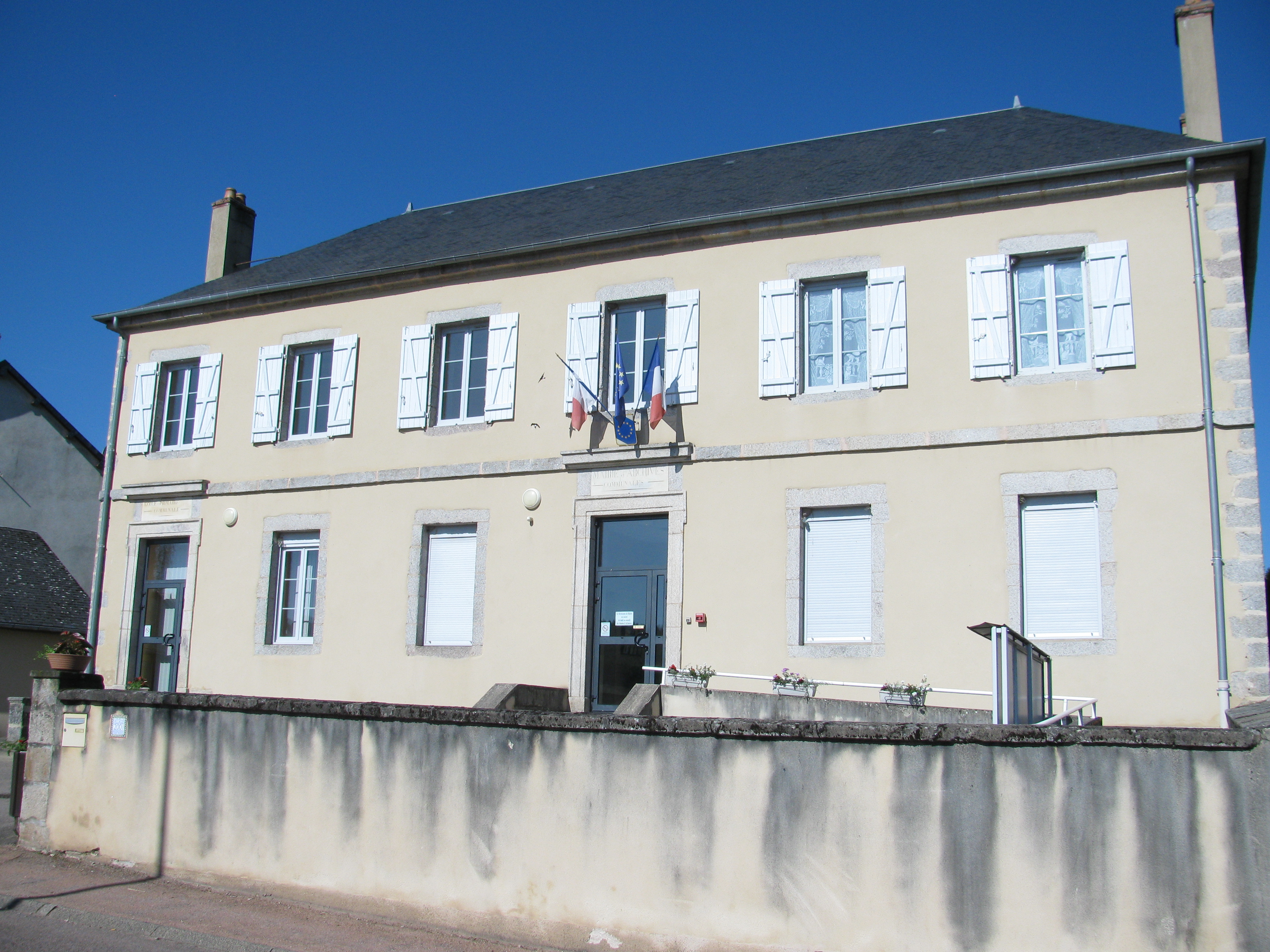
- The town hall in Alligny-en-Morvan
- Location of Alligny-en-Morvan
- Location within France Location within Bourgogne-Franche-Comté
- Coordinates: 47°12′03″N 4°10′41″E
- Country: France
- Region: Bourgogne-Franche-Comté
- Department: Nièvre
- Arrondissement: Château-Chinon
- Canton: Château-Chinon
- Intercommunality: CC Morvan Sommets et Grands Lacs

Government
  - Mayor (2020–2026): Marie-Christine Grosche
- Area^{1}: 48.85 km^{2} (18.86 sq mi)
- Highest elevation: 703 m (2,306 ft)
- Lowest elevation: 410 m (1,350 ft)
- Population (2023): 594
  - Density: 12.2/km^{2} (31.5/sq mi)
- Demonym: Allignycois
- Time zone: UTC+01:00 (CET)
  - Summer (DST): UTC+02:00 (CEST)
- INSEE/Postal code: 58003 /58230
- ^{1} French Land Register data, which excludes lakes, ponds, glaciers > 1 km^{2} (0.386 sq mi or 247 acres) and river estuaries.

Alligny-en-Morvan (French pronunciation: [aliɲi ɑ̃ mɔʁvɑ̃]; lit. 'Alligny-in-Morvan'), commonly referred to simply as Alligny (Burgundian: Ailnié), is a rural commune in the Nièvre department in the Bourgogne-Franche-Comté region in central-east France.

Located in the east of the department, it borders Côte-d'Or to the northeast. It is part of Morvan Regional Natural Park.

== Population ==
Historical population
Year	Pop.	±% p.a.
1968	809	—
1975	734	−1.38%
1982	709	−0.49%
1990	679	−0.54%
1999	656	−0.38%
2007	645	−0.21%
2012	659	+0.43%
2017	613	−1.44%
2023	594	−0.52%
Source: INSEE

== See also ==
- Communes of the Nièvre department
- Morvan Regional Natural Park
