= Herbularium du Morvan =

Botanical garden with arboretum in Burgundy, France

Coordinates: 47.2753°N 4.0990°E

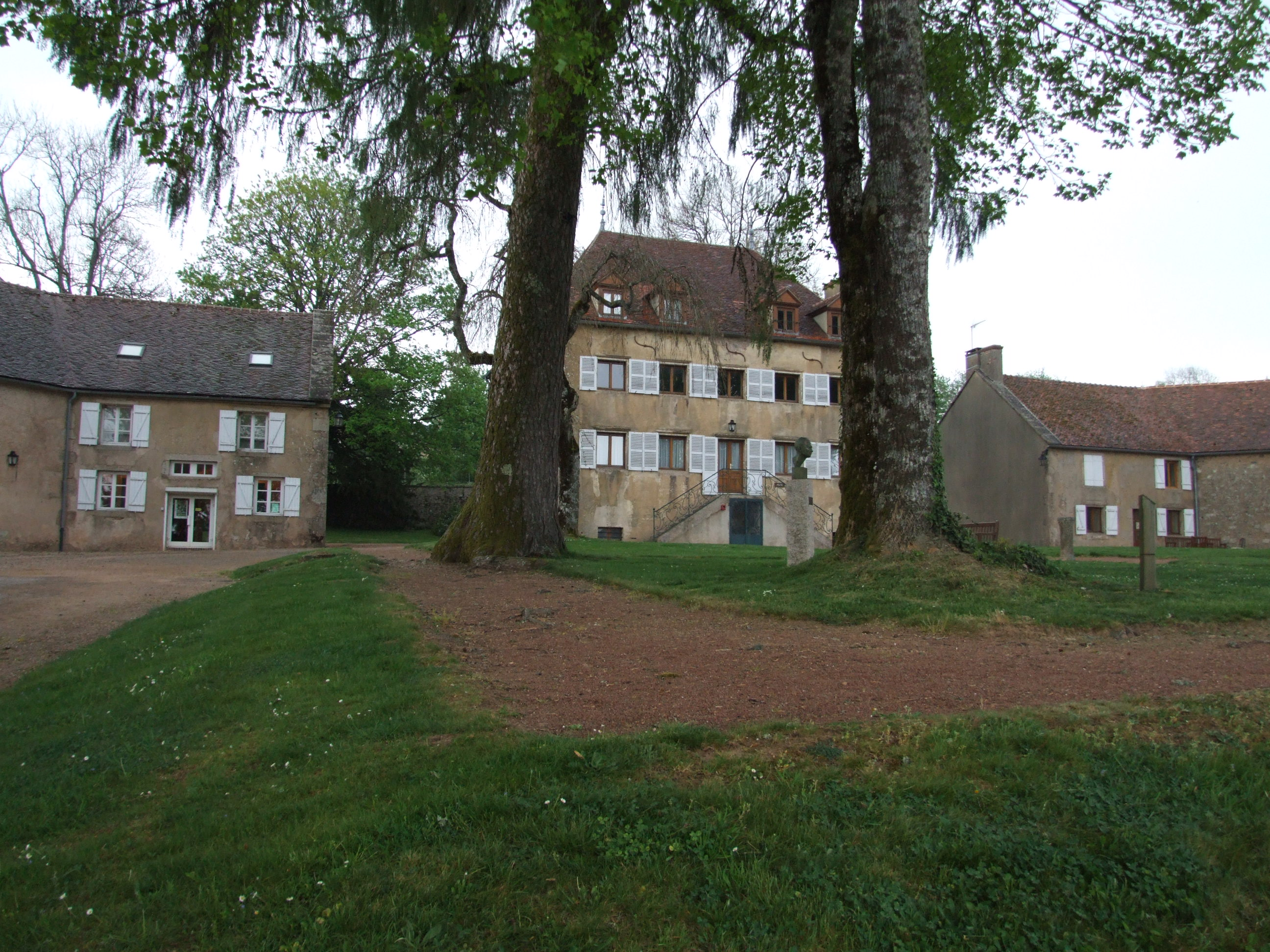
Saint-Brisson, Nievre, Burgundy

The Herbularium du Morvan (500 m^{2}), more formally known as the Herbularium du parc naturel régional du Morvan, is a botanical garden with arboretum located at the Maison du Parc in the Parc naturel régional du Morvan, Saint-Brisson, Nièvre, Burgundy, France. It is open year-round; admission is free.

The garden was established in 1987, inspired by medieval medicinal herb gardens but with a broader view encompassing plants native to the Morvan. It contains about 170 labeled species within 32 boxwood-edged beds (15 m^{2} each) as follows:

- characteristic plants of the Morvan (ten beds)
- climatic influences of the Morvan, with rare species (three beds)
- botanical miscellany (three beds)
- medicinal plants from the Morvan (six beds)
- cultivated food plants (three beds)
- local traditions (four beds)
- common plants and folk medicine (three beds)

Its arboretum contains a number of labeled specimens as well as a pond.

== See also ==
- List of botanical gardens in France
