= Champeau-en-Morvan =

- Commune
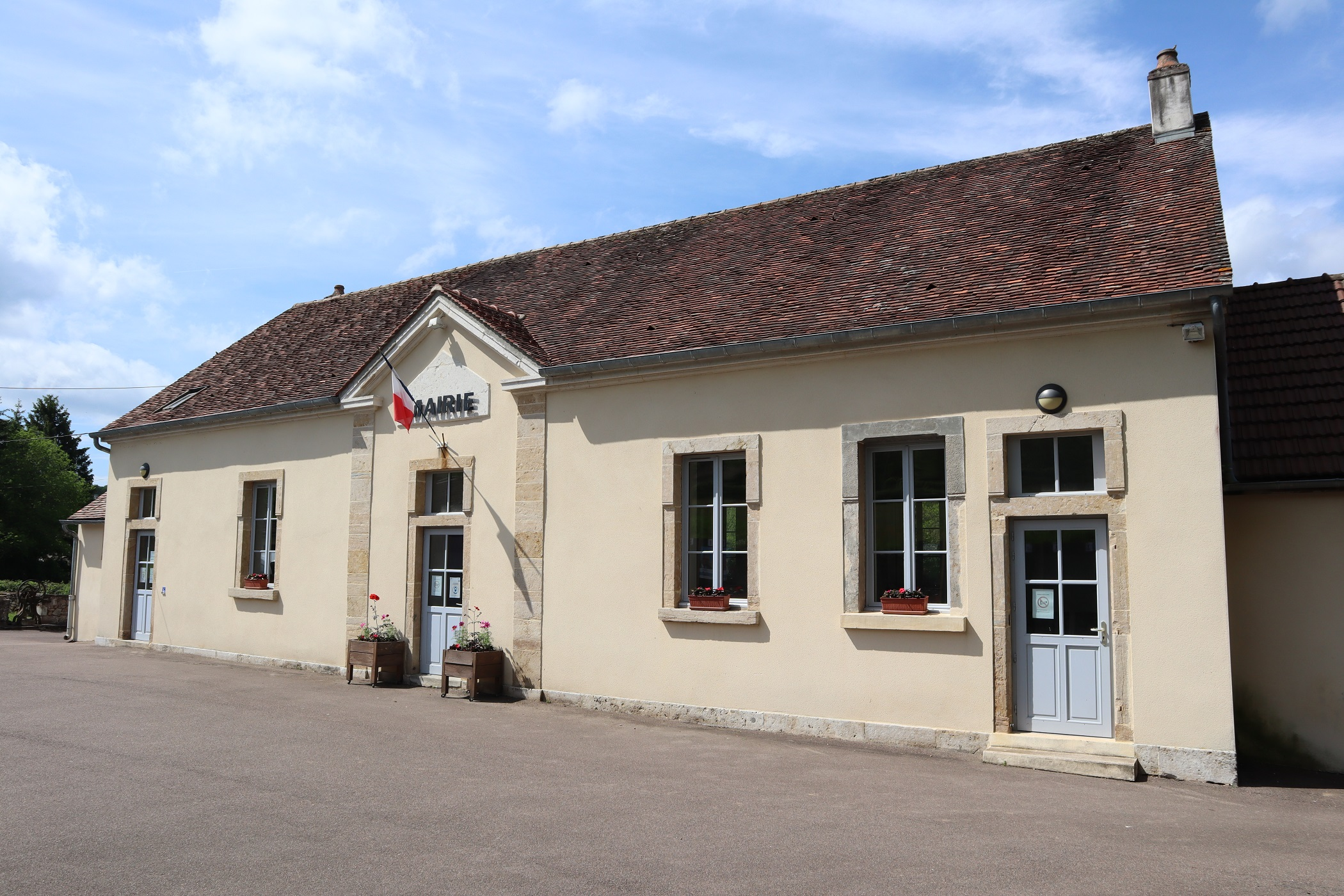
- Town hall
- Location of Champeau-en-Morvan
- Location within France Location within Bourgogne-Franche-Comté
- Coordinates: 47°16′38″N 4°08′42″E
- Country: France
- Region: Bourgogne-Franche-Comté
- Department: Côte-d'Or
- Arrondissement: Montbard
- Canton: Semur-en-Auxois
- Intercommunality: CC Saulieu-Morvan

Government
  - Mayor (2020–2026): Maryse Bollengier
- Area^{1}: 33.95 km^{2} (13.11 sq mi)
- Elevation: 600 m (2,000 ft)
- Highest elevation: 683 m (2,241 ft)
- Lowest elevation: 494 m (1,621 ft)
- Population (2023): 223
  - Density: 6.57/km^{2} (17.0/sq mi)
- Time zone: UTC+01:00 (CET)
  - Summer (DST): UTC+02:00 (CEST)
- INSEE/Postal code: 21139 /21210
- ^{1} French Land Register data, which excludes lakes, ponds, glaciers > 1 km^{2} (0.386 sq mi or 247 acres) and river estuaries.

Champeau-en-Morvan (French pronunciation: [ʃɑ̃po ɑ̃ mɔʁvɑ̃], lit. 'Champeau in Morvan', before 1992: Champeau) is a commune in the Côte-d'Or department in eastern France.

== Population ==
Historical population
Year	Pop.	±% p.a.
1968	318	—
1975	305	−0.59%
1982	276	−1.42%
1990	280	+0.18%
1999	237	−1.84%
2007	251	+0.72%
2012	246	−0.40%
2017	228	−1.51%
2023	223	−0.37%
Source: INSEE

== See also ==
- Communes of the Côte-d'Or department
- Parc naturel régional du Morvan
