= Ménessaire =

- Commune
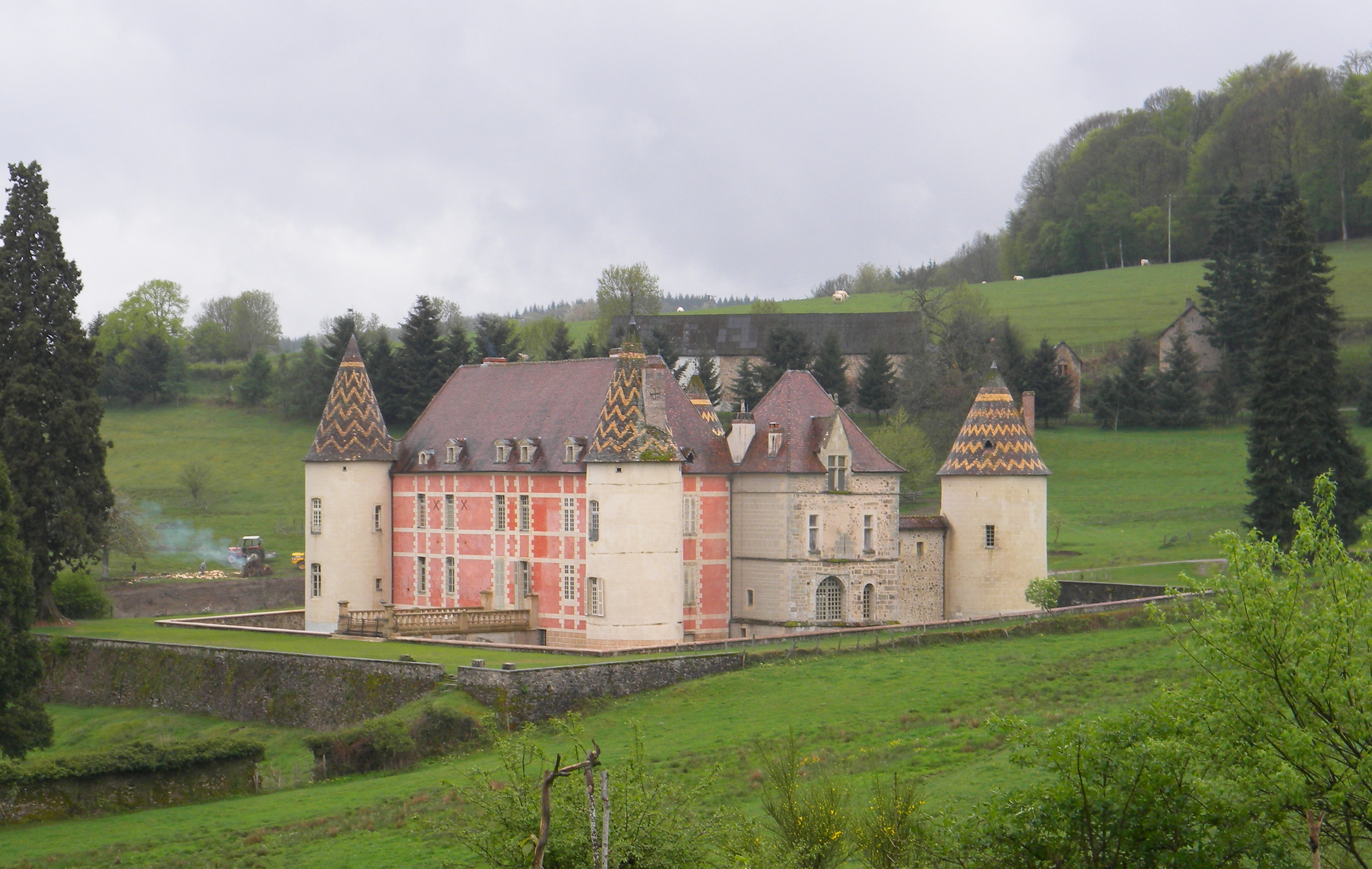
- The Château de Ménessaire, a monument historique
- Location of Ménessaire
- Location within France Location within Bourgogne-Franche-Comté
- Coordinates: 47°08′09″N 4°08′55″E
- Country: France
- Region: Bourgogne-Franche-Comté
- Department: Côte-d'Or
- Arrondissement: Beaune
- Canton: Arnay-le-Duc
- Intercommunality: CC du Pays d'Arnay Liernais

Government
  - Mayor (2020–2026): Nadine Rateau
- Area^{1}: 14.91 km^{2} (5.76 sq mi)
- Elevation: 550 m (1,800 ft)
- Highest elevation: 721 m (2,365 ft)
- Lowest elevation: 393 m (1,289 ft)
- Population (2023): 75
  - Density: 5.0/km^{2} (13/sq mi)
- Time zone: UTC+01:00 (CET)
  - Summer (DST): UTC+02:00 (CEST)
- INSEE/Postal code: 21403 /21430
- ^{1} French Land Register data, which excludes lakes, ponds, glaciers > 1 km^{2} (0.386 sq mi or 247 acres) and river estuaries.

Ménessaire (French pronunciation: [men(ə)sɛʁ]; Burgundian: Meunsiâre) is a rural commune in the Côte-d'Or department in the Bourgogne-Franche-Comté region in central-east France.

A Côte-d'Or exclave on the border between the Nièvre and Saône-et-Loire departments, Ménessaire is part of Morvan Regional Natural Park. It comprises the Mont de Gien, the highest point in Côte-d'Or, at 721 metres.

== History ==
On 25 May 1944 at the end of World War II, amid the Liberation of France, Ménessaire was one of the communes in the Morvan attacked by the German occupying forces because several of its inhabitants supported the French Resistance. The Duc family had sheltered a number of Maquisards, an act for which their farm was burnt down by the Germans, after the Maquisards had fled.

== Demographics ==
Historical population
Year	Pop.	±% p.a.
1968	131	—
1975	136	+0.54%
1982	119	−1.89%
1990	96	−2.65%
1999	88	−0.96%
2007	70	−2.82%
2012	78	+2.19%
2017	86	+1.97%
2023	75	−2.26%
Source: INSEE

== See also ==
- Communes of the Côte-d'Or department
- Morvan Regional Natural Park
