= Brazey-en-Morvan =

- Commune
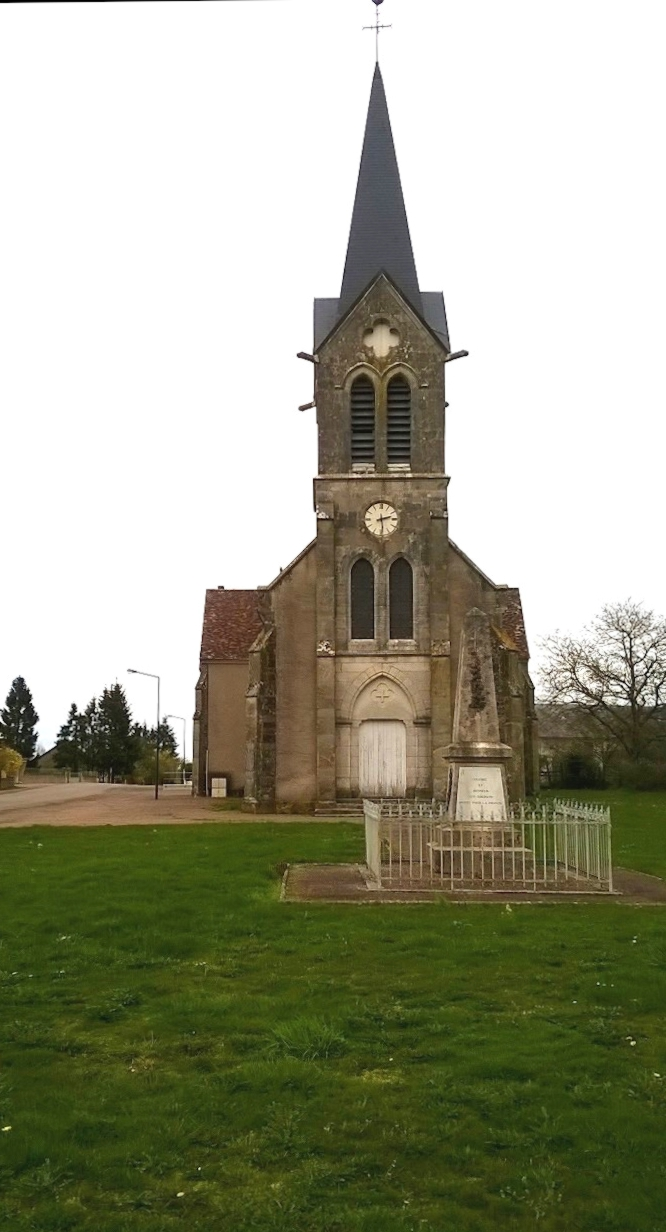
- The church in Brazey-en-Morvan

- Coat of arms
- Location of Brazey-en-Morvan
- Location within France Location within Bourgogne-Franche-Comté
- Coordinates: 47°10′26″N 4°17′25″E
- Country: France
- Region: Bourgogne-Franche-Comté
- Department: Côte-d'Or
- Arrondissement: Beaune
- Canton: Arnay-le-Duc

Government
  - Mayor (2020–2026): René Margerie
- Area^{1}: 17.22 km^{2} (6.65 sq mi)
- Elevation: 502 m (1,647 ft)
- Highest elevation: 537 m (1,762 ft)
- Lowest elevation: 415 m (1,362 ft)
- Population (2023): 155
  - Density: 9.00/km^{2} (23.3/sq mi)
- Time zone: UTC+01:00 (CET)
  - Summer (DST): UTC+02:00 (CEST)
- INSEE/Postal code: 21102 /21430
- ^{1} French Land Register data, which excludes lakes, ponds, glaciers > 1 km^{2} (0.386 sq mi or 247 acres) and river estuaries.

Brazey-en-Morvan (French pronunciation: [bʁazɛ ɑ̃ mɔʁvɑ̃], lit. 'Brazey in Morvan') is a commune in the Côte-d'Or department in eastern France.

== Population ==
Historical population
| Year | Pop. | ±% p.a. |
|---|---|---|
| 1968 | 225 | — |
| 1975 | 204 | −1.39% |
| 1982 | 162 | −3.24% |
| 1990 | 158 | −0.31% |
| 1999 | 156 | −0.14% |
| 2007 | 167 | +0.86% |
| 2012 | 141 | −3.33% |
| 2017 | 139 | −0.29% |
| 2023 | 155 | +1.83% |
Source: INSEE

== See also ==
- Communes of the Côte-d'Or department
- Parc naturel régional du Morvan
