= Canal de Bourgogne =

Canal in France

Coordinates: 47°16′04″N 4°32′36″E

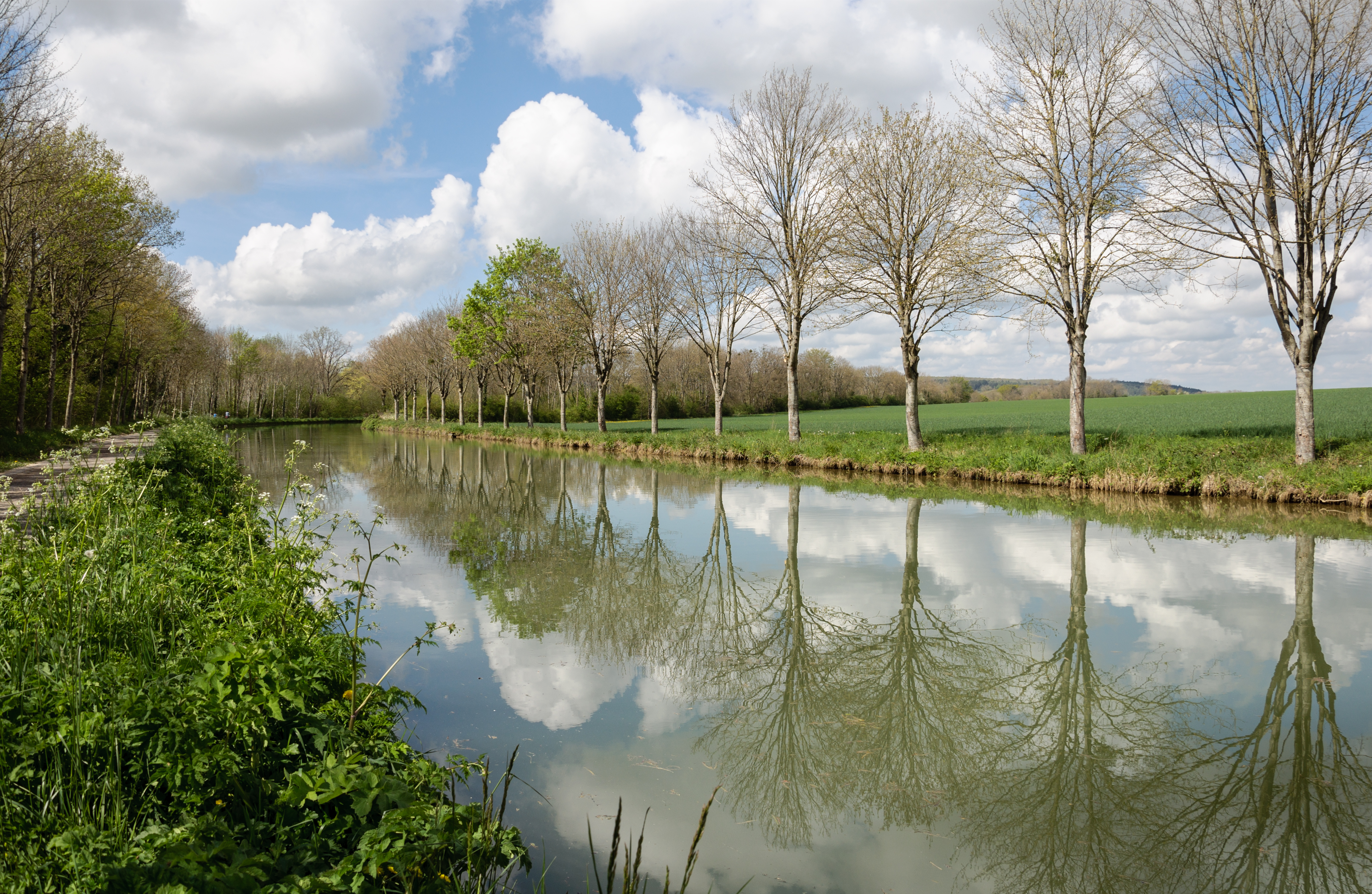
- The Canal de Bourgogne in Chassignelles
- Interactive map of Canal de Bourgogne

Specifications
- Length: 242 km (150 mi)
- Lock length: 40 m
- Lock width: 5.2 m
- Locks: 189 (originally 191)
- Status: Open

History
- Construction began: 1775
- Date completed: 1832

Geography
- Start point: Yonne junction in Migennes
- End point: Saône junction in Saint-Jean-de-Losne
- Connects to: Yonne, Saône

The Canal de Bourgogne (French pronunciation: [kanal də buʁɡɔɲ]; English: Canal of Burgundy or Burgundy Canal) is a canal in the Burgundy historical region in east-central France. It connects the Yonne at Migennes with the Saône at Saint-Jean-de-Losne. Construction began in 1775 and was completed in 1832. The canal completes the link between the English Channel and the Mediterranean Sea, via the rivers Seine and the Yonne to the Saône and Rhône.

The canal is 242 km (150 mi) long, with 189 locks. There were originally 191 lock basins, but the double staircase locks at Migennes (114-115Y) and Germigny (106-107Y) had the uppermost set of gates removed and the lower chamber raised to form single locks, but they are twice as deep as a standard lock (5.13 m and 5.14 m instead of the usual 2.5 to 3 m).

The canal passes through the departments of Yonne and Côte-d'Or. Its summit level is at Pouilly-en-Auxois, 378 m above sea level, when the canal passes through a tunnel 3.3 km long. The lowest point is at the junction with the Yonne at 79 m (259 ft) above sea level.

== Description ==
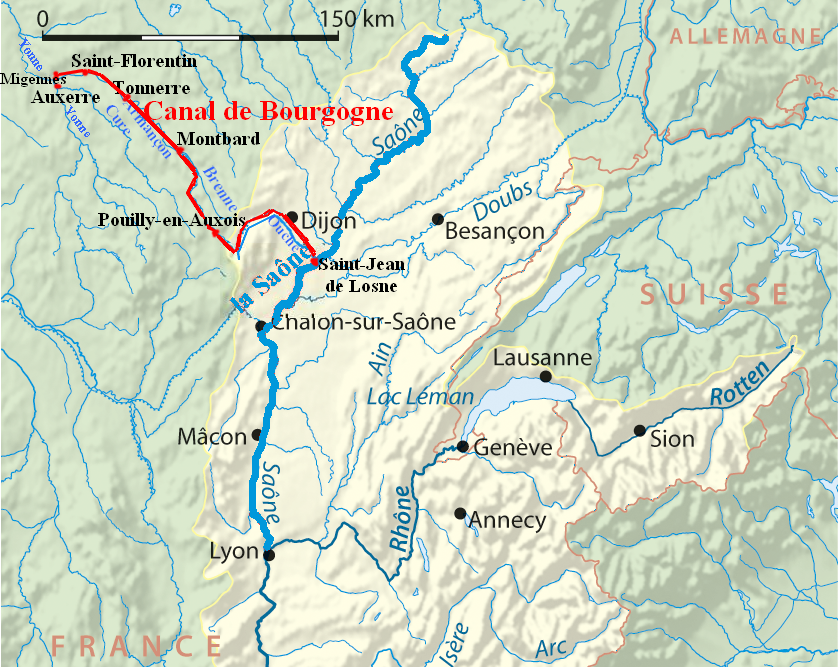
Current route of the canal

North entrance of the canal tunnel at Pouilly-en-Auxois

The canal begins at Migennes where the former double staircase lock gives access from the Yonne to a large basin. For the next 100 km the canal follows the valley of the Armançon river. This is a centuries-old route towards the south-east, which is why the canal is closely followed by road and railway. The first lock after leaving Migennes, Cheny (113Y), is one of the few electric locks to be found on the canal. After 9 km the canal arrives in Brienon-sur-Armançon with its recently built grain silos which permit the loading of barges and trains. The canal then heads off towards Saint-Florentin with its aqueduct over the Armance river and the impressive church overlooking the lower town.

After the former double lock at Germigny (107-106Y) and Egrevin lock (105Y) the canal runs alongside the D905 (formerly N5) road. This pound suffered exceptional damage with almost all of the trees being blown down during the great storm of 26 December 1999. The canal continues through Flogny-la-Chapelle, somewhat surprisingly leaves Burgundy for a short stretch (1.5 km) as it passes through Charrey in the Aube department (Champagne-Ardenne region) and heads to the town of Tonnerre, famous for the Fosse Dionne spring and the birthplace of the Chevalier d'Eon.

Leaving Tonnerre the canal closely follows the Armançon and meanders due to hills situated between Tonnerre and Ancy-le-Franc. The canal passes through the village of Commissey before arriving in Tanlay with its impressive Renaissance château. At Lézinnes boats meet a series of six electrified locks, taking them past a cement works and more grain silos at Pacy-sur-Armançon and on to Ancy-le-Franc. Here the tourist can visit the famous 16th-century château set in its vast grounds.

Leaving Ravières there is an extremely difficult pound which suffers from intense growth of aquatic weeds and which can cause fouling of the propeller. Immediately after is situated the small village of Cry-sur-Armançon, site of the Acrobatix Adventure Park.

After passing through Aisy the canal enters the Côte-d'Or department. It then runs through Buffon past the great ironwork forge built by the Comte de Buffon in the 18th century. It is then merely a short trip until arrival in the town of Montbard. Nearby is the Abbey of Fontenay. The canal is now running through the wide, flat plain of the river Brenne. Eight locks and 13 km after Montbard the canal arrives in Venarey-les-Laumes situated close to the village of Alise-Sainte-Reine thought to be the site of the Battle of Alesia.

At this point the geography changes dramatically. The railway carries on straight towards Dijon, climbing the steep Burgundy escarpment which it crosses by means of a 4.1 km (2.5 mi) long tunnel at Blaisy-Bas. The canal on the other hand has to divert southwards passing through 40 locks in the space of 14 km (8.7 mi). It then reaches more friendly ground before the final approach to the summit at Pouilly-en-Auxois. Here there is a large, fully equipped port close to the centre of town.

The canal then runs through a tree-lined cutting before entering the 3-kilometre long tunnel. Boats must be fitted with a fixed or hand-held spotlight to pass through, following a fatal accident a number of years ago inside the tunnel itself. Emerging near the village of Créancey the canal begins to drop, passing close to the A6 autoroute, past the villages of Vandenesse and Châteauneuf before meeting the river Ouche at Pont-d'Ouche where there are moorings for boats wishing to lay up for the winter. Nearby is the small town of Bligny-sur-Ouche where there is a butterfly museum and a narrow-gauge railway built on the trackbed of a line leading from the mining town of Epinac to loading staithes on the canal. The canal now changes direction from SE to NNE running through the valley of the river Ouche as it makes its way towards Dijon, the capital of the Burgundy region. On arrival in Plombières-lès-Dijon the canal turns SE passing close to Lac Kir, a man-made lake used for leisure activities, named after Canon Félix Kir, a former mayor of Dijon and after whom is named the white wine and crème de cassis drink known as Kir.

On leaving the port of Dijon and running past the SNCF depot at Perrigny and the airport at Longvic the canal enters the wide and relatively flat valley of the Saône. In the final 30 kilometres the canal is totally straight apart from a slight turn near Thorey-en-Plaine and the main activity of the area is now farming. Shortly after passing by Brazey-en-Plaine the canal reaches its end at Saint-Jean-de-Losne, the largest inland pleasure port in France, where it joins the river Saône.

== History ==
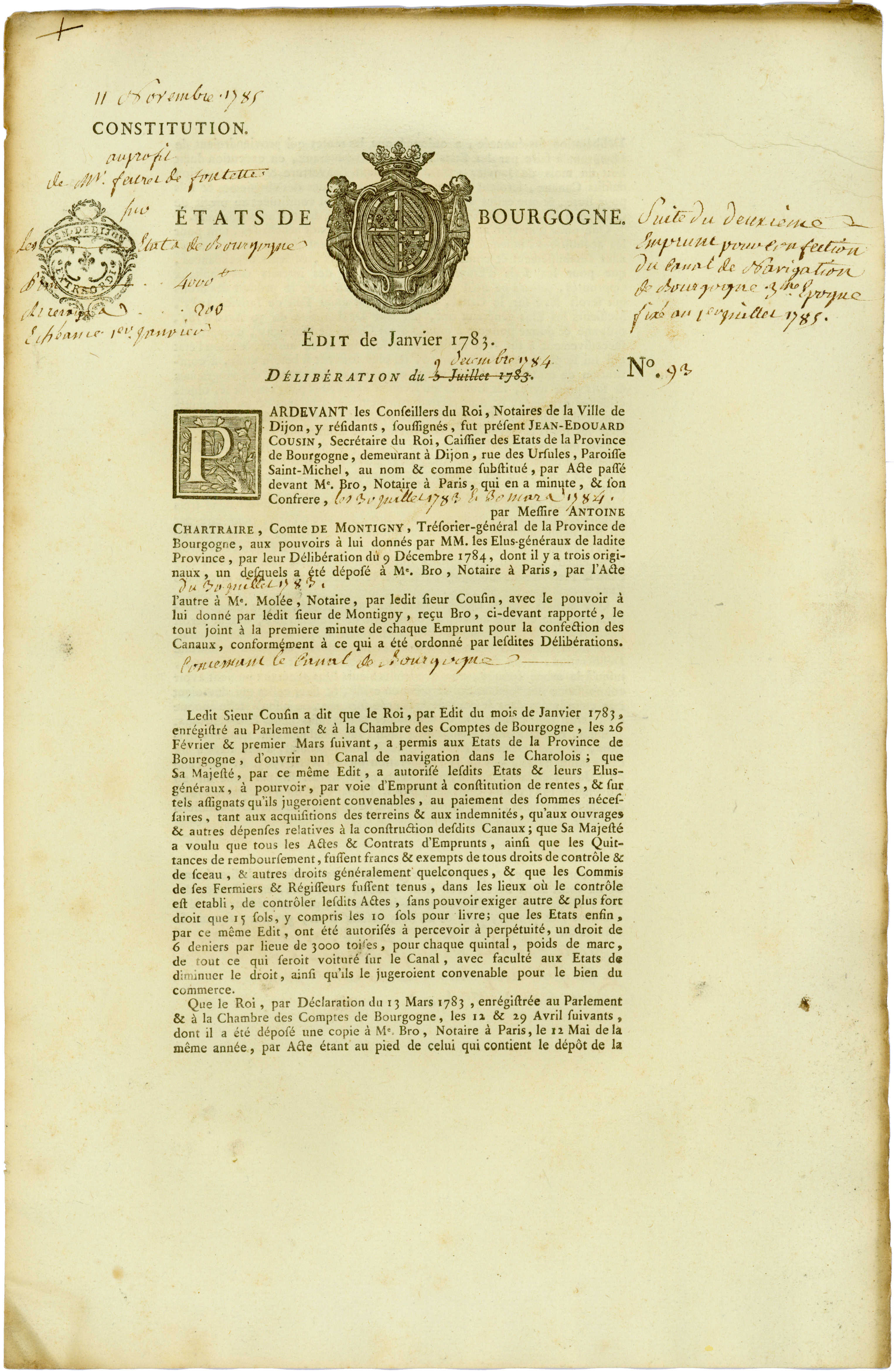
Contrat of a 5 % Bond for 4,000 Livres of the Burgundy for funding the Canal de Bourogone, issued 11. November 1785

Construction of the canal was already under consideration as early as 1605, during the reign of Henry IV. Difficulties were foreseen in crossing the Morvan Massif, however. In addition to the route finally selected, studies were made for various other routes, all of them passing further to the north. In the end, however, it was decided that the canal should follow the valleys of the rivers Armançon and Ouche. Louis XV signed an edict for the canal's construction on 7 September 1773. In 1774 it was stipulated that the crown would pay for the section running to the Yonne while the other half, towards the Saône, would be funded by the Estates of Burgundy. In 1775 the total cost was estimated at 7.18 Million French pounds.

Work began in 1777 on the Laroche-Tonnerre section. In 1781 work started from the other end, between Dijon and the Saône. During the early years of the French Revolution, between 1790 and 1795, progress on the construction slowed and then stopped. Work resumed only in 1808 after a Napoleonic degree announced the sale to private companies of four major existing canals in order to finance further canal construction.

1808 saw the opening of the section between Laroche and Dijon, thereby providing access to the Saône and so, indirectly, to the Rhône valley. At this time the challenge of how the canal should cross the drainage divide between the Saône and the Yonne valleys was still being argued, but in 1812 the adopted solution involved a tunnel and the creation of reservoirs to feed water into the higher pounds of the canal. The tunnel was built between 1826 and 1832, and in 1832 the entire canal was opened for navigation, although work on the important feeder reservoirs was not completed till 1840.

Between 1879 and 1882 work was completed, where necessary, to increase lock sizes to conform to the Freycinet standard, after which it became possible to move barges of up to 250 tonnes displacement, and up to 38.50 metres long on the canal.

The Canal de Bourgogne was, when built, an engineering triumph. Commercial usage never quite reached the levels that its promoters had envisaged, however. Traffic grew between 1832 and 1850, by when 43.5 million tonnes were being carried annually, but thereafter growth tailed off and volumes were disappointing. There were various reasons for this:

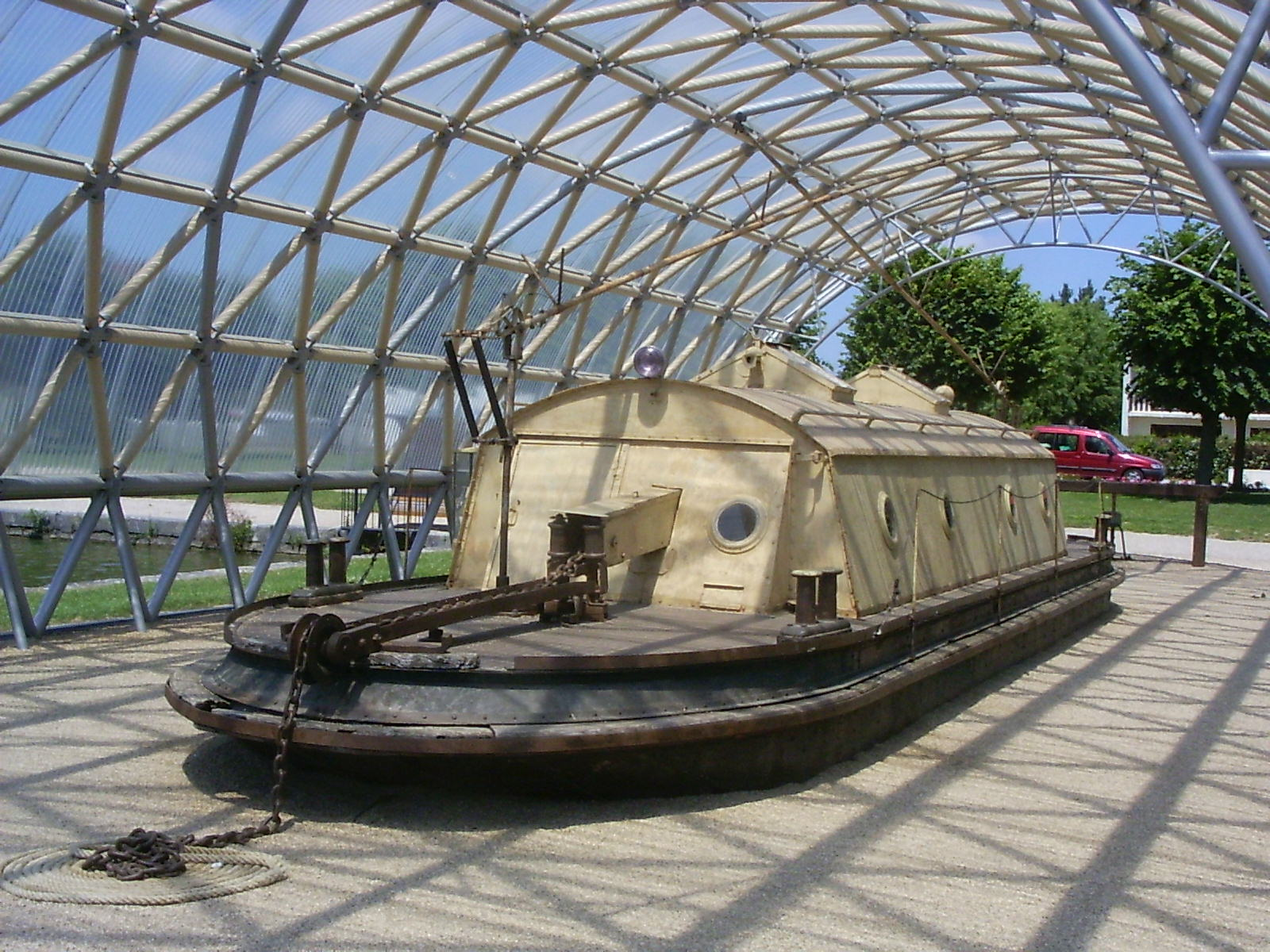
Tunnel electric tugboat, Pouilly-en-Auxois

- Even after work had been completed on enlarging the locks, in 1882, the canal's size remained a constraint on volumes, notably at Pouilly-en-Auxois, where the tunnel's one-way only traffic lengthened journey times and reduced flexibility for canal users (the tugboat that towed the convoys of péniches can still be seen at Pouilly-en-Auxois.)
- Competition from railways had not been foreseen when the canal was built, and was still a future threat when it was completed in 1832. However, between 1847 and 1852, the Paris–Marseille railway, its strategic and economic importance highlighted by its designation as an "impériale" communications artery, made it possible to transport goods much more rapidly and in very much larger volumes than could be achieved using the canal.

The canal was experimentally taken over by the Région Bourgogne in 2010, but after two years returned to VNF’s management. It carries very little traffic, and the region baulked at the rehabilitation expenditure to be committed.

== Users ==
Commercial barge traffic is restricted to the two extremities; between St Jean de Losne and Dijon in the south and from Migennes to Brienon in the north. Otherwise traffic is restricted to three types of user: privately owned boats (now the most important user group), hire craft, in decline due to the closure of several hire bases in recent years, and hotel barges, mainly centered on the Ouche valley in the south, although three hotel barges remain operating on the northern section.

== En route ==
- PK 0 Laroche-Migennes
- PK 19 Saint-Florentin
- PK 45 Tonnerre
- PK 74 Ancy-le-Franc
- PK 102 Montbard
- PK 115 Venarey-les-Laumes
- PK 155 Pouilly-en-Auxois
- PK 213 Dijon
- PK 242 Saint-Jean-de-Losne

== See also ==
- List of canals in France
