= Mélisey =

Mélisey may refer to:

- Mélisey, Haute-Saône, a commune in France
- Mélisey, Yonne, a commune in France
