= Colan =

Colan may refer to:

== Places ==
- Colan, Cornwall, a village and civil parish in Cornwall, United Kingdom
- A beach in the Piura Region of Peru

== People ==
- Gene Colan
- Joanne Colan
- Ioana Petcu-Colan
- Nicolae Colan
- Colan, a character in G.K. Chesterton's poem The Ballad of the White Horse

== See also ==
- Collan
