= Argentenay =

- Commune
- Location of Argentenay
- Location within France Location within Bourgogne-Franche-Comté
- Coordinates: 47°48′56″N 4°06′47″E
- Country: France
- Region: Bourgogne-Franche-Comté
- Department: Yonne
- Arrondissement: Avallon
- Canton: Tonnerrois
- Intercommunality: CC Tonnerrois Bourgogne

Government
  - Mayor (2020–2026): Catherine Corbet-Tronel
- Area^{1}: 5.07 km^{2} (1.96 sq mi)
- Highest elevation: 273 m (896 ft)
- Lowest elevation: 154 m (505 ft)
- Population (2023): 82
  - Density: 16/km^{2} (42/sq mi)
- Time zone: UTC+01:00 (CET)
  - Summer (DST): UTC+02:00 (CEST)
- INSEE/Postal code: 89016 /89160
- ^{1} French Land Register data, which excludes lakes, ponds, glaciers > 1 km^{2} (0.386 sq mi or 247 acres) and river estuaries.

Argentenay (French pronunciation: [aʁʒɑ̃tnɛ]) is a commune in the Yonne department in Bourgogne-Franche-Comté in north-central France.

== See also ==
- Communes of the Yonne department
