= Tissey =

- Commune
- Location of Tissey
- Location within France Location within Bourgogne-Franche-Comté
- Coordinates: 47°51′09″N 3°54′13″E
- Country: France
- Region: Bourgogne-Franche-Comté
- Department: Yonne
- Arrondissement: Avallon
- Canton: Tonnerrois

Government
  - Mayor (2020–2026): Thomas Levoy
- Area^{1}: 5.97 km^{2} (2.31 sq mi)
- Highest elevation: 278 m (912 ft)
- Lowest elevation: 167 m (548 ft)
- Population (2023): 108
  - Density: 18.1/km^{2} (46.9/sq mi)
- Time zone: UTC+01:00 (CET)
  - Summer (DST): UTC+02:00 (CEST)
- INSEE/Postal code: 89417 /89700
- ^{1} French Land Register data, which excludes lakes, ponds, glaciers > 1 km^{2} (0.386 sq mi or 247 acres) and river estuaries.

Tissey (French pronunciation: [tisɛ]) is a commune in the Yonne department in Bourgogne-Franche-Comté in north-central France.

== See also ==
- Communes of the Yonne department
