= Bernouil =

- Commune
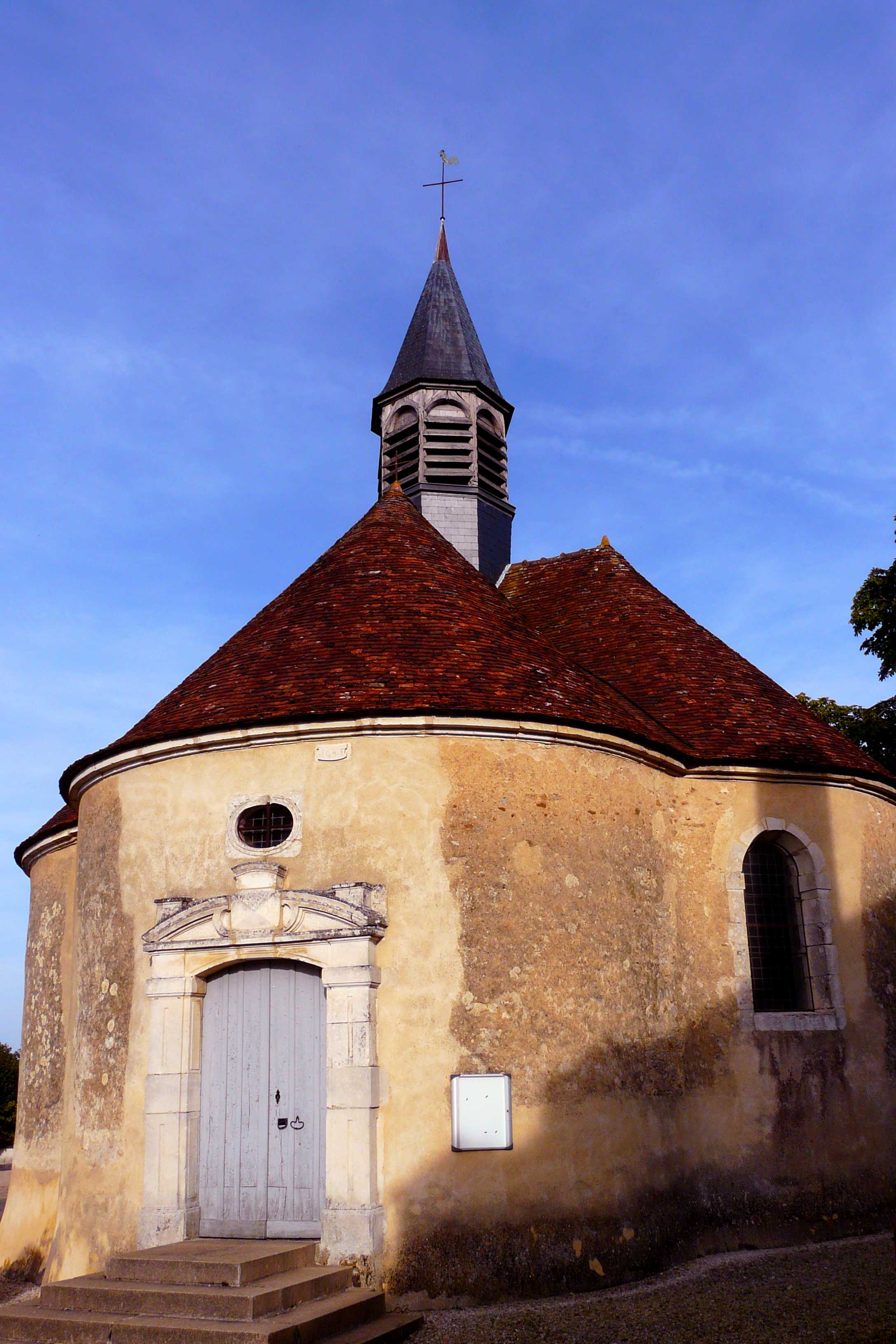
- The church in Bernouil
- Location of Bernouil
- Location within France Location within Bourgogne-Franche-Comté
- Coordinates: 47°54′02″N 3°53′45″E
- Country: France
- Region: Bourgogne-Franche-Comté
- Department: Yonne
- Arrondissement: Avallon
- Canton: Tonnerrois

Government
  - Mayor (2020–2026): Dominique Fournillon
- Area^{1}: 4.55 km^{2} (1.76 sq mi)
- Highest elevation: 259 m (850 ft)
- Lowest elevation: 119 m (390 ft)
- Population (2023): 109
  - Density: 24.0/km^{2} (62.0/sq mi)
- Time zone: UTC+01:00 (CET)
  - Summer (DST): UTC+02:00 (CEST)
- INSEE/Postal code: 89038 /89360
- ^{1} French Land Register data, which excludes lakes, ponds, glaciers > 1 km^{2} (0.386 sq mi or 247 acres) and river estuaries.

Bernouil (French pronunciation: [bɛʁnuj]) is a commune in the Yonne department in Bourgogne-Franche-Comté in north-central France.

== See also ==
- Communes of the Yonne department
