= Rugny =

- Commune
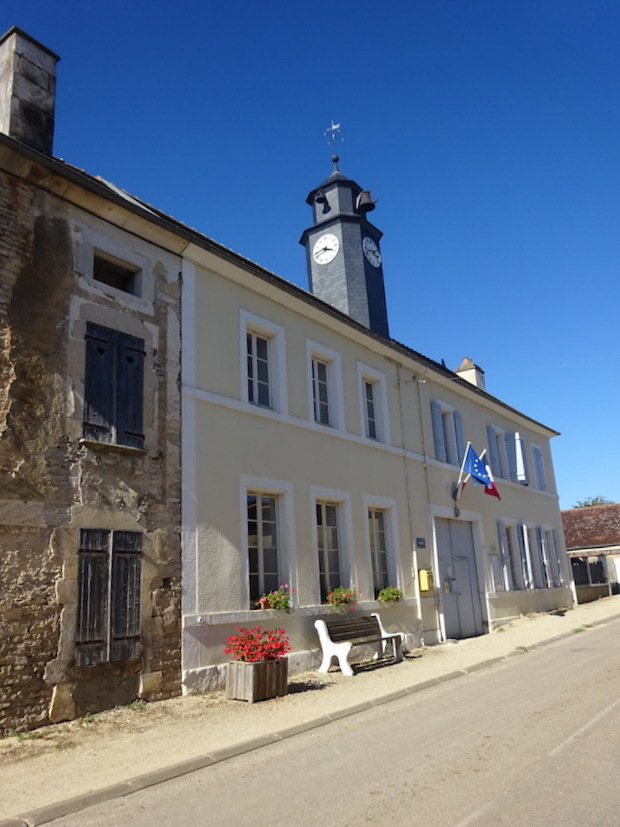
- The town hall in Rugny
- Location of Rugny
- Location within France Location within Bourgogne-Franche-Comté
- Coordinates: 47°53′54″N 4°08′51″E
- Country: France
- Region: Bourgogne-Franche-Comté
- Department: Yonne
- Arrondissement: Avallon
- Canton: Tonnerrois

Government
  - Mayor (2020–2026): Jacky Neveux
- Area^{1}: 13.89 km^{2} (5.36 sq mi)
- Highest elevation: 353 m (1,158 ft)
- Lowest elevation: 185 m (607 ft)
- Population (2023): 78
  - Density: 5.6/km^{2} (15/sq mi)
- Time zone: UTC+01:00 (CET)
  - Summer (DST): UTC+02:00 (CEST)
- INSEE/Postal code: 89329 /89430
- ^{1} French Land Register data, which excludes lakes, ponds, glaciers > 1 km^{2} (0.386 sq mi or 247 acres) and river estuaries.

Rugny (French pronunciation: [ʁyɲi]) is a commune in the Yonne department in Bourgogne-Franche-Comté in north-central France.

== See also ==
- Communes of the Yonne department
