= Molosmes =

- Commune
- Coat of arms
- Location of Molosmes
- Location within France Location within Bourgogne-Franche-Comté
- Coordinates: 47°53′15″N 4°02′40″E
- Country: France
- Region: Bourgogne-Franche-Comté
- Department: Yonne
- Arrondissement: Avallon
- Canton: Tonnerrois

Government
  - Mayor (2020–2026): Dominique Bussy
- Area^{1}: 24.51 km^{2} (9.46 sq mi)
- Highest elevation: 328 m (1,076 ft)
- Lowest elevation: 150 m (490 ft)
- Population (2023): 155
  - Density: 6.32/km^{2} (16.4/sq mi)
- Time zone: UTC+01:00 (CET)
  - Summer (DST): UTC+02:00 (CEST)
- INSEE/Postal code: 89262 /89700
- ^{1} French Land Register data, which excludes lakes, ponds, glaciers > 1 km^{2} (0.386 sq mi or 247 acres) and river estuaries.

Molosmes (French pronunciation: [mɔlom]) is a commune in the Yonne department in Bourgogne-Franche-Comté in north-central France.

== See also ==
- Communes of the Yonne department
