= Vézannes =

- Commune
- Location of Vézannes
- Location within France Location within Bourgogne-Franche-Comté
- Coordinates: 47°52′38″N 3°52′32″E
- Country: France
- Region: Bourgogne-Franche-Comté
- Department: Yonne
- Arrondissement: Avallon
- Canton: Tonnerrois

Government
  - Mayor (2020–2026): Régis Lhomme
- Area^{1}: 9.01 km^{2} (3.48 sq mi)
- Highest elevation: 277 m (909 ft)
- Lowest elevation: 155 m (509 ft)
- Population (2023): 52
  - Density: 5.8/km^{2} (15/sq mi)
- Time zone: UTC+01:00 (CET)
  - Summer (DST): UTC+02:00 (CEST)
- INSEE/Postal code: 89445 /89700
- ^{1} French Land Register data, which excludes lakes, ponds, glaciers > 1 km^{2} (0.386 sq mi or 247 acres) and river estuaries.

Vézannes (French pronunciation: [vezan]) is a commune in the Yonne department in Bourgogne-Franche-Comté in north-central France.

== See also ==
- Communes of the Yonne department
