= Perrigny-sur-Armançon =

- Commune
- Location of Perrigny-sur-Armançon
- Location within France Location within Bourgogne-Franche-Comté
- Coordinates: 47°41′25″N 4°14′14″E
- Country: France
- Region: Bourgogne-Franche-Comté
- Department: Yonne
- Arrondissement: Avallon
- Canton: Tonnerrois

Government
  - Mayor (2020–2026): Anne-Marie Dal Degan
- Area^{1}: 14.04 km^{2} (5.42 sq mi)
- Highest elevation: 306 m (1,004 ft)
- Lowest elevation: 187 m (614 ft)
- Population (2023): 123
  - Density: 8.76/km^{2} (22.7/sq mi)
- Time zone: UTC+01:00 (CET)
  - Summer (DST): UTC+02:00 (CEST)
- INSEE/Postal code: 89296 /89390
- ^{1} French Land Register data, which excludes lakes, ponds, glaciers > 1 km^{2} (0.386 sq mi or 247 acres) and river estuaries.

Perrigny-sur-Armançon (French pronunciation: [pɛʁiɲi syʁ aʁmɑ̃sɔ̃], literally Perrigny on Armançon) is a commune in the Yonne department in Bourgogne-Franche-Comté in north-central France.

== See also ==
- Communes of the Yonne department
