= Viviers, Yonne =

Viviers
- Commune
- Coat of arms
- Location of Viviers
- Location within France Location within Bourgogne-Franche-Comté
- Coordinates: 47°48′14″N 3°55′19″E
- Country: France
- Region: Bourgogne-Franche-Comté
- Department: Yonne
- Arrondissement: Avallon
- Canton: Tonnerrois
- Intercommunality: Le Tonnerrois en Bourgogne

Government
  - Mayor (2023–2026): Christian Picq
- Area^{1}: 9.18 km^{2} (3.54 sq mi)
- Highest elevation: 336 m (1,102 ft)
- Lowest elevation: 190 m (620 ft)
- Population (2023): 106
  - Density: 11.5/km^{2} (29.9/sq mi)
- Time zone: UTC+01:00 (CET)
  - Summer (DST): UTC+02:00 (CEST)
- INSEE/Postal code: 89482 /89700
- ^{1} French Land Register data, which excludes lakes, ponds, glaciers > 1 km^{2} (0.386 sq mi or 247 acres) and river estuaries.

Viviers (French pronunciation: [vivje]) is a commune in the Yonne department in Bourgogne-Franche-Comté in north-central France.

== See also ==
- Communes of the Yonne department
