= Dannemoine =

- Commune
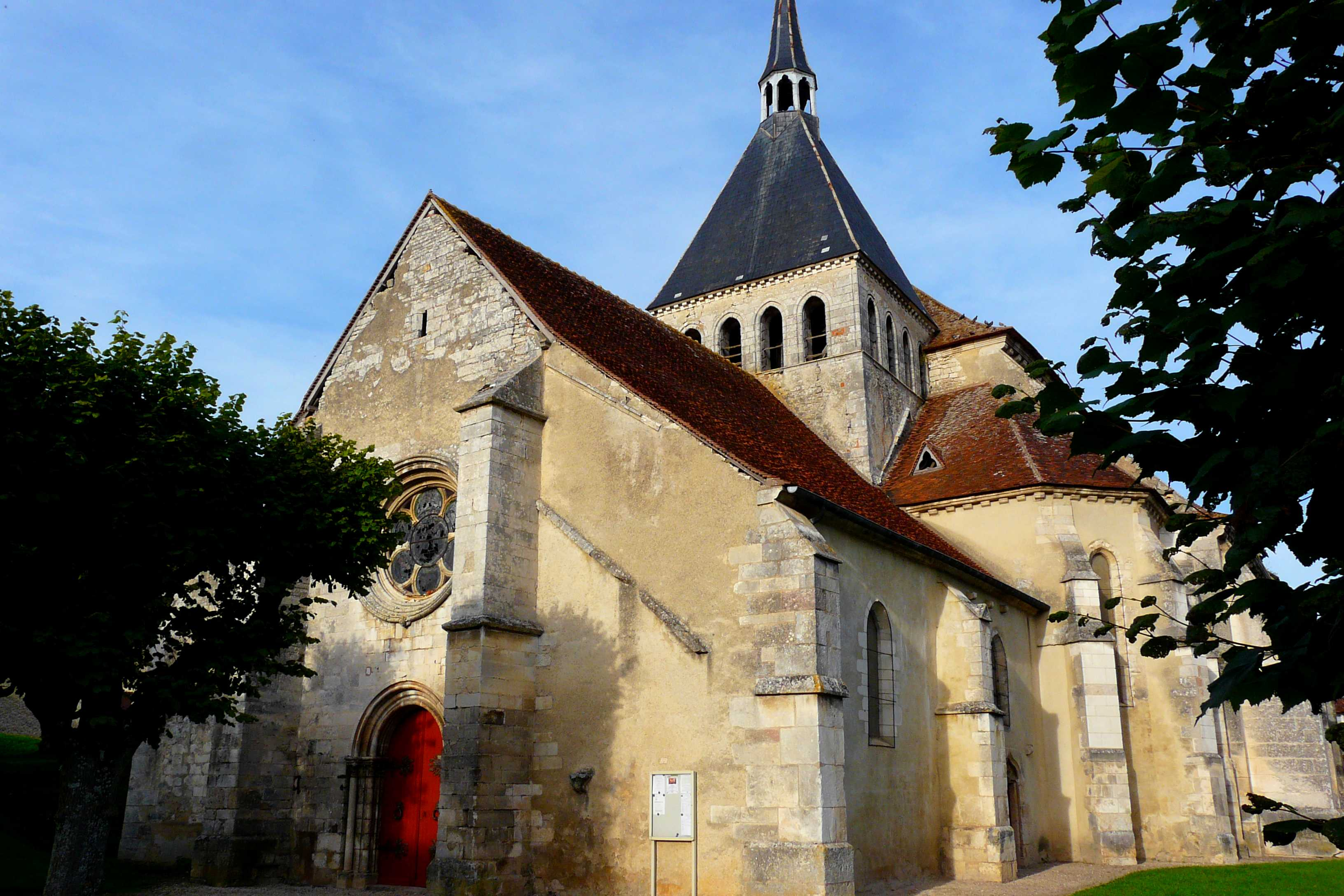
- The church in Dannemoine

- Coat of arms
- Location of Dannemoine
- Location within France Location within Bourgogne-Franche-Comté
- Coordinates: 47°53′47″N 3°57′22″E
- Country: France
- Region: Bourgogne-Franche-Comté
- Department: Yonne
- Arrondissement: Avallon
- Canton: Tonnerrois

Government
  - Mayor (2020–2026): Dominique Mentrel
- Area^{1}: 10.28 km^{2} (3.97 sq mi)
- Highest elevation: 309 m (1,014 ft)
- Lowest elevation: 128 m (420 ft)
- Population (2023): 452
  - Density: 44.0/km^{2} (114/sq mi)
- Time zone: UTC+01:00 (CET)
  - Summer (DST): UTC+02:00 (CEST)
- INSEE/Postal code: 89137 /89700
- ^{1} French Land Register data, which excludes lakes, ponds, glaciers > 1 km^{2} (0.386 sq mi or 247 acres) and river estuaries.

Dannemoine (French pronunciation: [danmwan]) is a commune in the Yonne department in Bourgogne-Franche-Comté in north-central France.

== See also ==
- Communes of the Yonne department
