= Cheney, Yonne =

Cheney
- Commune
- Location of Cheney
- Location within France Location within Bourgogne-Franche-Comté
- Coordinates: 47°54′30″N 3°56′54″E
- Country: France
- Region: Bourgogne-Franche-Comté
- Department: Yonne
- Arrondissement: Avallon
- Canton: Tonnerrois

Government
  - Mayor (2020–2026): Marc Calonne
- Area^{1}: 5.95 km^{2} (2.30 sq mi)
- Highest elevation: 237 m (778 ft)
- Lowest elevation: 126 m (413 ft)
- Population (2023): 235
  - Density: 39.5/km^{2} (102/sq mi)
- Time zone: UTC+01:00 (CET)
  - Summer (DST): UTC+02:00 (CEST)
- INSEE/Postal code: 89098 /89700
- ^{1} French Land Register data, which excludes lakes, ponds, glaciers > 1 km^{2} (0.386 sq mi or 247 acres) and river estuaries.

Cheney (French pronunciation: [ʃənɛ]) is a commune in the Yonne department in Bourgogne-Franche-Comté in north-central France.

== See also ==
- Communes of the Yonne department
