= Junay =

- Commune
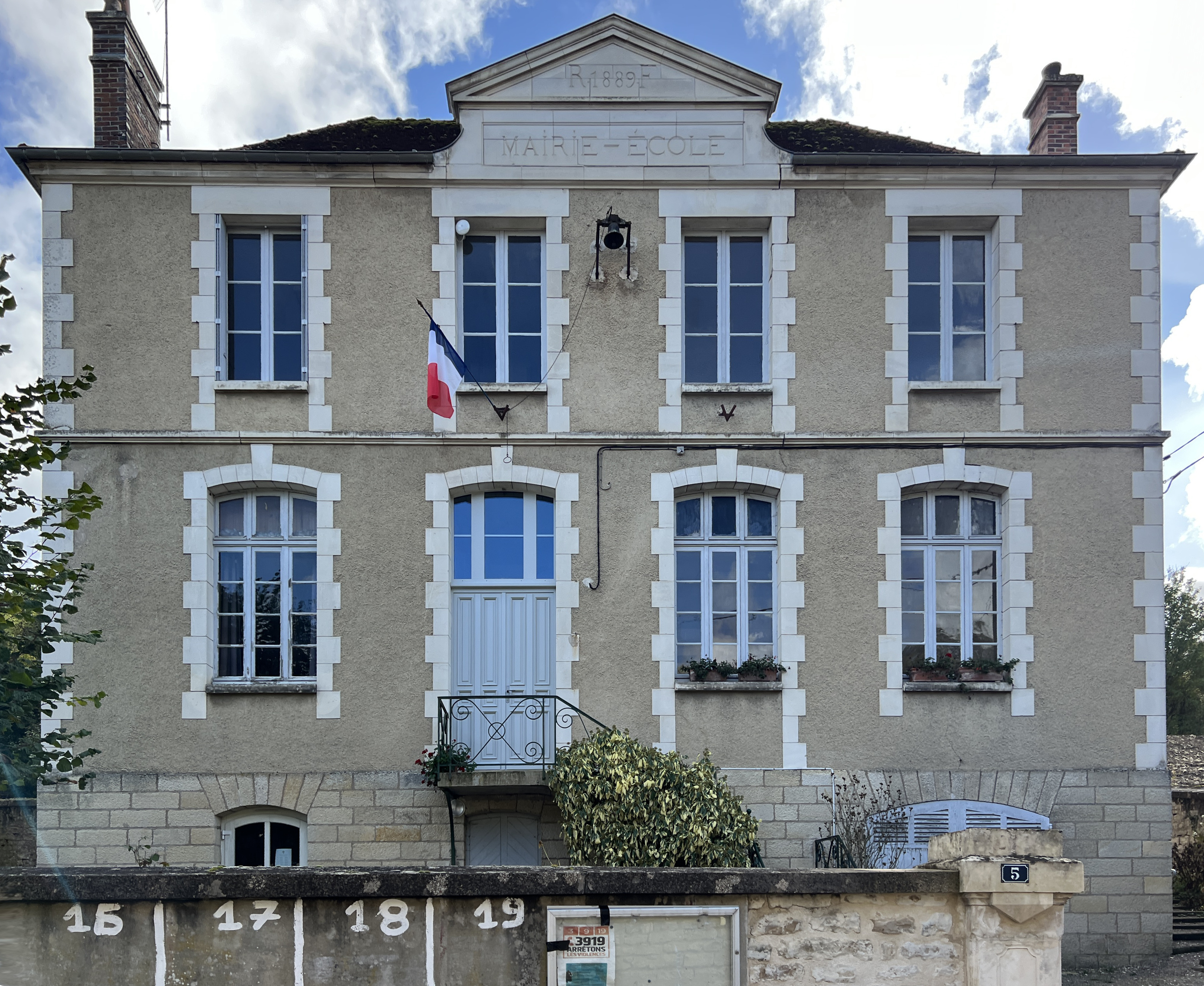
- Junay Town hall
- Location of Junay
- Location within France Location within Bourgogne-Franche-Comté
- Coordinates: 47°52′44″N 3°56′57″E
- Country: France
- Region: Bourgogne-Franche-Comté
- Department: Yonne
- Arrondissement: Avallon
- Canton: Tonnerrois
- Area^{1}: 3.63 km^{2} (1.40 sq mi)
- Highest elevation: 278 m (912 ft)
- Lowest elevation: 127 m (417 ft)
- Population (2023): 61
  - Density: 17/km^{2} (44/sq mi)
- Time zone: UTC+01:00 (CET)
  - Summer (DST): UTC+02:00 (CEST)
- INSEE/Postal code: 89211 /89700
- ^{1} French Land Register data, which excludes lakes, ponds, glaciers > 1 km^{2} (0.386 sq mi or 247 acres) and river estuaries.

Junay (French pronunciation: [ʒynɛ]) is a commune in the Yonne department in Bourgogne-Franche-Comté in north-central France.

== See also ==
- Communes of the Yonne department
