= Roffey, Yonne =

Roffey
- Commune
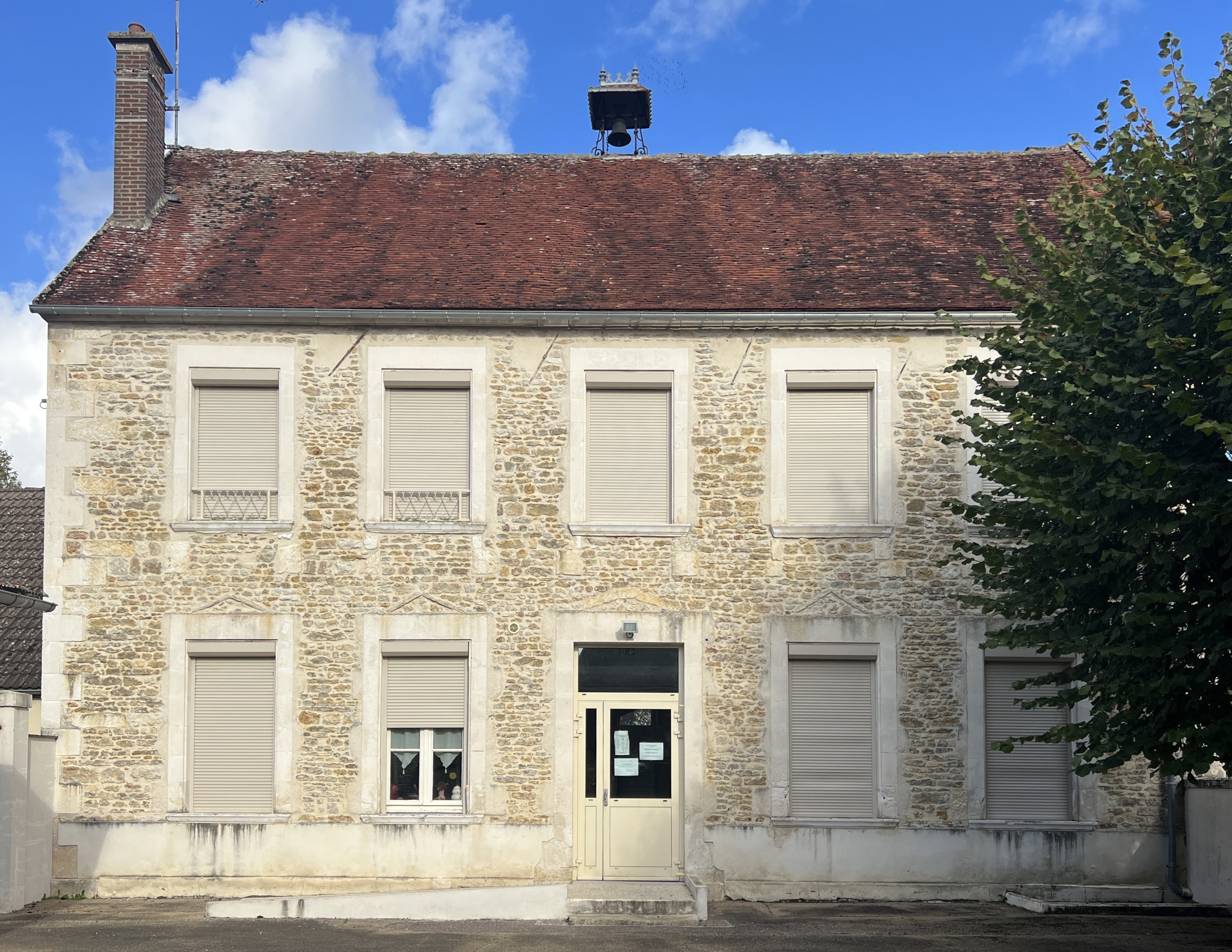
- Roffey Town hall
- Location of Roffey
- Location within France Location within Bourgogne-Franche-Comté
- Coordinates: 47°55′06″N 3°55′18″E
- Country: France
- Region: Bourgogne-Franche-Comté
- Department: Yonne
- Arrondissement: Avallon
- Canton: Tonnerrois

Government
  - Mayor (2020–2026): Rémi Gautheron
- Area^{1}: 8.55 km^{2} (3.30 sq mi)
- Highest elevation: 246 m (807 ft)
- Lowest elevation: 120 m (390 ft)
- Population (2023): 148
  - Density: 17.3/km^{2} (44.8/sq mi)
- Time zone: UTC+01:00 (CET)
  - Summer (DST): UTC+02:00 (CEST)
- INSEE/Postal code: 89323 /89700
- ^{1} French Land Register data, which excludes lakes, ponds, glaciers > 1 km^{2} (0.386 sq mi or 247 acres) and river estuaries.

Roffey (French pronunciation: [ʁɔfɛ]) is a commune in the Yonne department in Bourgogne-Franche-Comté in north-central France.

== See also ==
- Communes of the Yonne department
