= Fulvy =

- Commune
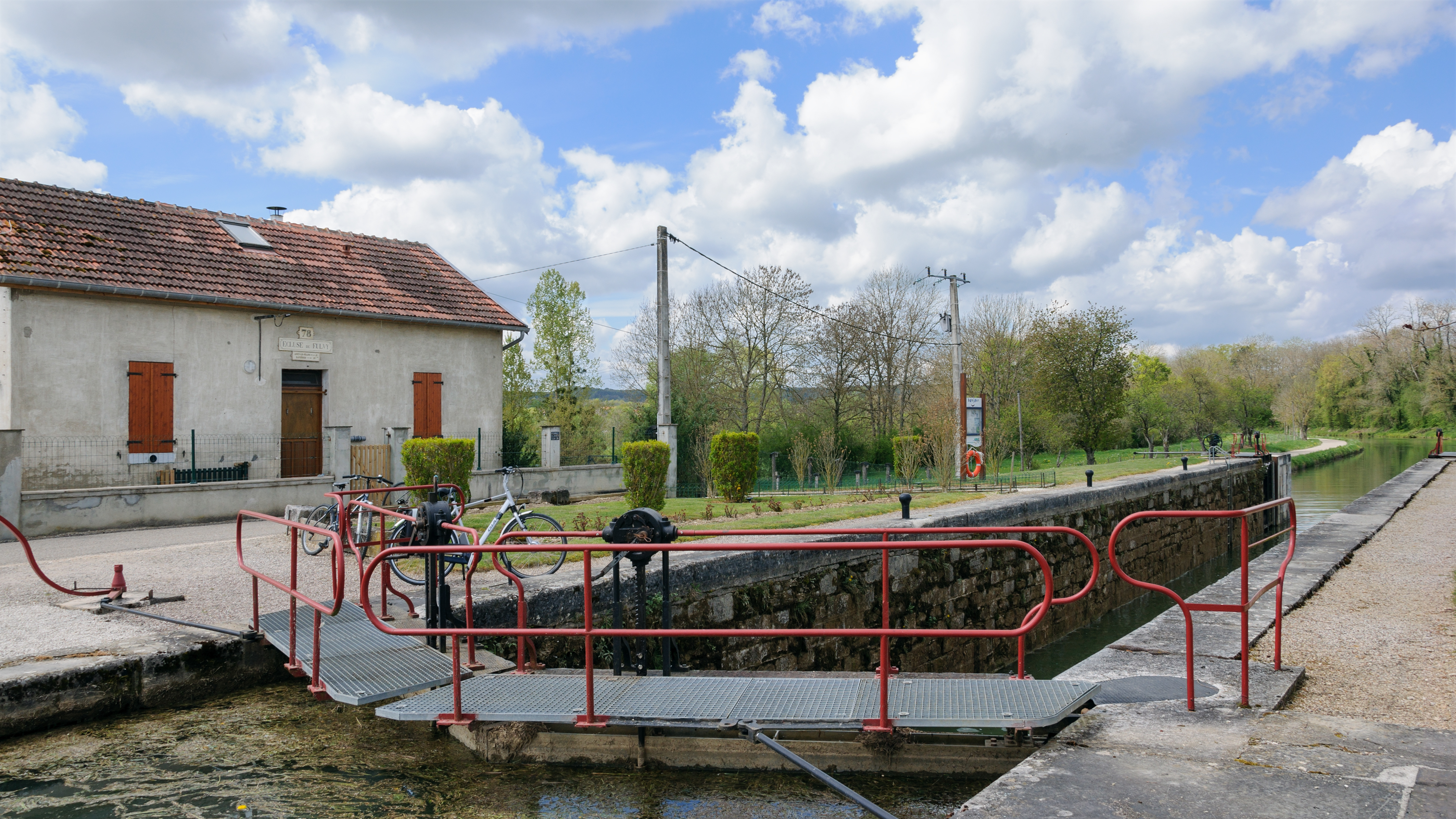
- Lock 78 on the Bourgogne canal in Fulvy
- Location of Fulvy
- Location within France Location within Bourgogne-Franche-Comté
- Coordinates: 47°44′31″N 4°10′19″E
- Country: France
- Region: Bourgogne-Franche-Comté
- Department: Yonne
- Arrondissement: Avallon
- Canton: Tonnerrois

Government
  - Mayor (2020–2026): Robert Herbert
- Area^{1}: 3.81 km^{2} (1.47 sq mi)
- Highest elevation: 291 m (955 ft)
- Lowest elevation: 174 m (571 ft)
- Population (2023): 128
  - Density: 33.6/km^{2} (87.0/sq mi)
- Time zone: UTC+01:00 (CET)
  - Summer (DST): UTC+02:00 (CEST)
- INSEE/Postal code: 89184 /89160
- ^{1} French Land Register data, which excludes lakes, ponds, glaciers > 1 km^{2} (0.386 sq mi or 247 acres) and river estuaries.

Fulvy (French pronunciation: [fylvi]) is a commune in the Yonne department in Bourgogne-Franche-Comté in north-central France.

== See also ==
- Communes of the Yonne department
