= Villon, Yonne =

Villon
- Commune
- Location of Villon
- Location within France Location within Bourgogne-Franche-Comté
- Coordinates: 47°54′38″N 4°11′24″E
- Country: France
- Region: Bourgogne-Franche-Comté
- Department: Yonne
- Arrondissement: Avallon
- Canton: Tonnerrois

Government
  - Mayor (2021–2026): Nadine Champagne Manteau
- Area^{1}: 9.42 km^{2} (3.64 sq mi)
- Highest elevation: 352 m (1,155 ft)
- Lowest elevation: 190 m (620 ft)
- Population (2023): 112
  - Density: 11.9/km^{2} (30.8/sq mi)
- Time zone: UTC+01:00 (CET)
  - Summer (DST): UTC+02:00 (CEST)
- INSEE/Postal code: 89475 /89740
- ^{1} French Land Register data, which excludes lakes, ponds, glaciers > 1 km^{2} (0.386 sq mi or 247 acres) and river estuaries.

Villon is a commune in the Yonne department in Bourgogne-Franche-Comté in north-central France.

== See also ==
- Communes of the Yonne department
