= Quincerot, Yonne =

Quincerot
- Commune
- Coat of arms
- Location of Quincerot
- Location within France Location within Bourgogne-Franche-Comté
- Coordinates: 47°56′33″N 4°09′50″E
- Country: France
- Region: Bourgogne-Franche-Comté
- Department: Yonne
- Arrondissement: Avallon
- Canton: Tonnerrois

Government
  - Mayor (2020–2026): Serge Bethouart
- Area^{1}: 9.91 km^{2} (3.83 sq mi)
- Highest elevation: 347 m (1,138 ft)
- Lowest elevation: 221 m (725 ft)
- Population (2023): 46
  - Density: 4.6/km^{2} (12/sq mi)
- Time zone: UTC+01:00 (CET)
  - Summer (DST): UTC+02:00 (CEST)
- INSEE/Postal code: 89320 /89740
- ^{1} French Land Register data, which excludes lakes, ponds, glaciers > 1 km^{2} (0.386 sq mi or 247 acres) and river estuaries.

Quincerot (French pronunciation: [kɛ̃sʁo]) is a commune in the Yonne department in Bourgogne-Franche-Comté in north-central France.

== See also ==
- Communes of the Yonne department
