= Ancy-le-Libre =

- Commune
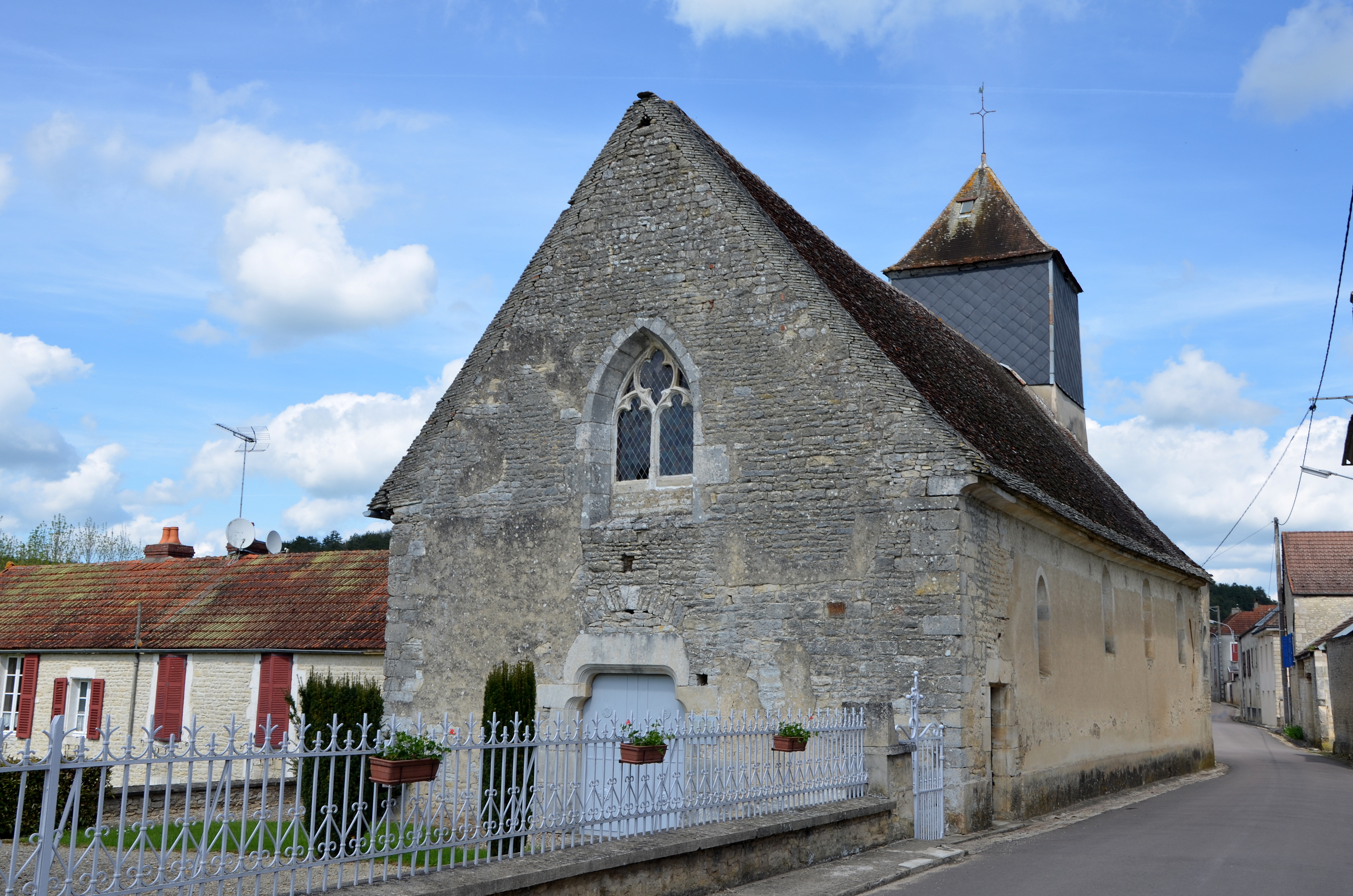
- The church in Ancy-le-Libre
- Location of Ancy-le-Libre
- Location within France Location within Bourgogne-Franche-Comté
- Coordinates: 47°48′12″N 4°07′26″E
- Country: France
- Region: Bourgogne-Franche-Comté
- Department: Yonne
- Arrondissement: Avallon
- Canton: Tonnerrois
- Intercommunality: Le Tonnerrois en Bourgogne

Government
  - Mayor (2020–2026): Véronique Burgevin
- Area^{1}: 21.65 km^{2} (8.36 sq mi)
- Highest elevation: 288 m (945 ft)
- Lowest elevation: 155 m (509 ft)
- Population (2023): 137
  - Density: 6.33/km^{2} (16.4/sq mi)
- Time zone: UTC+01:00 (CET)
  - Summer (DST): UTC+02:00 (CEST)
- INSEE/Postal code: 89006 /89160
- ^{1} French Land Register data, which excludes lakes, ponds, glaciers > 1 km^{2} (0.386 sq mi or 247 acres) and river estuaries.

Ancy-le-Libre (French pronunciation: [ɑ̃si lə libʁ]) is a commune in the Yonne department in Bourgogne-Franche-Comté in north-central France.

== See also ==
- Communes of the Yonne department
