= Dyé =

- Commune
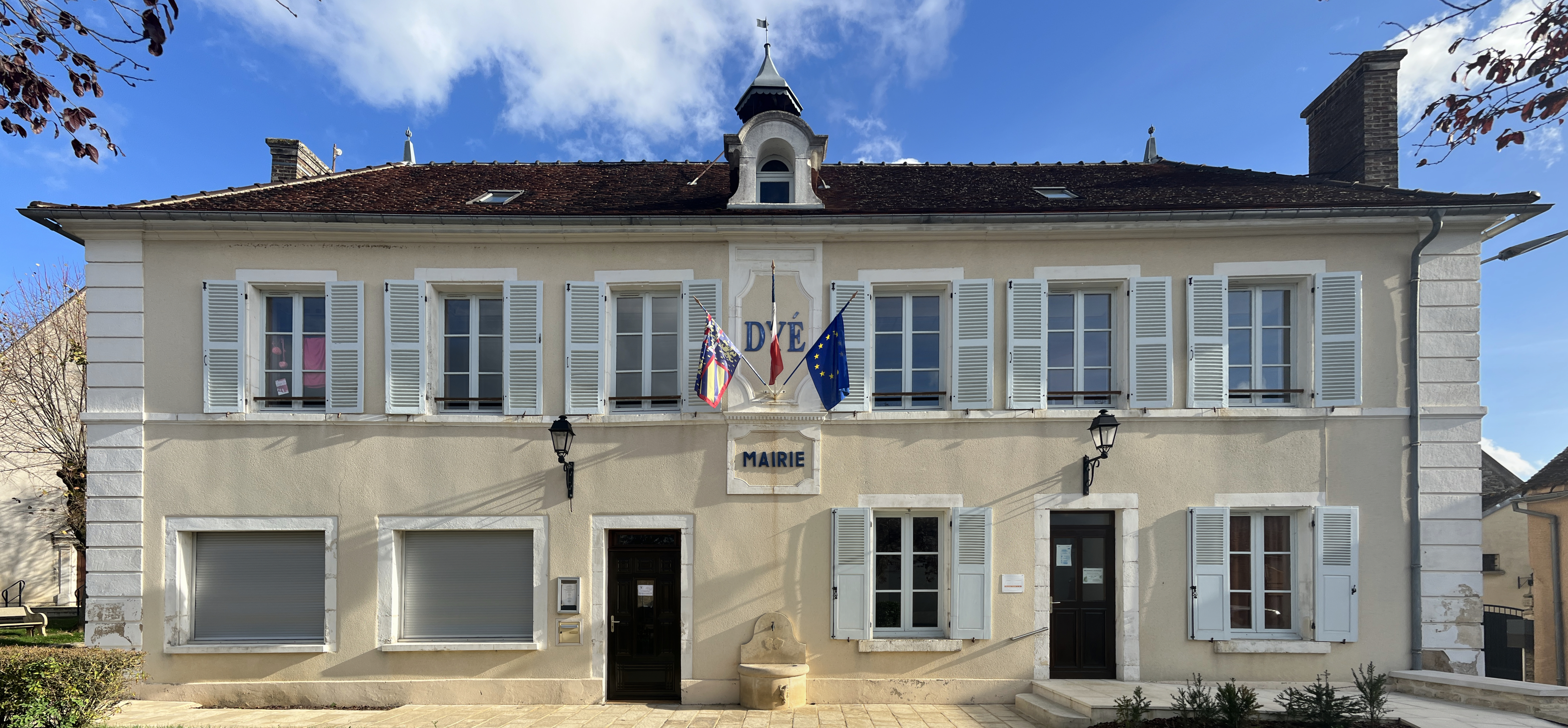
- Dyé Town hall

- Coat of arms
- Location of Dyé
- Location within France Location within Bourgogne-Franche-Comté
- Coordinates: 47°54′00″N 3°52′14″E
- Country: France
- Region: Bourgogne-Franche-Comté
- Department: Yonne
- Arrondissement: Avallon
- Canton: Tonnerrois

Government
  - Mayor (2020–2026): Olivier Durand
- Area^{1}: 17.00 km^{2} (6.56 sq mi)
- Highest elevation: 251 m (823 ft)
- Lowest elevation: 135 m (443 ft)
- Population (2023): 186
  - Density: 10.9/km^{2} (28.3/sq mi)
- Time zone: UTC+01:00 (CET)
  - Summer (DST): UTC+02:00 (CEST)
- INSEE/Postal code: 89149 /89360
- ^{1} French Land Register data, which excludes lakes, ponds, glaciers > 1 km^{2} (0.386 sq mi or 247 acres) and river estuaries.

Dyé (French pronunciation: [dje]) is a commune in the Yonne department in Bourgogne-Franche-Comté in north-central France. As of 2023, the population of the commune was 186.

== See also ==
- Communes of the Yonne department
