= Arthonnay =

- Commune
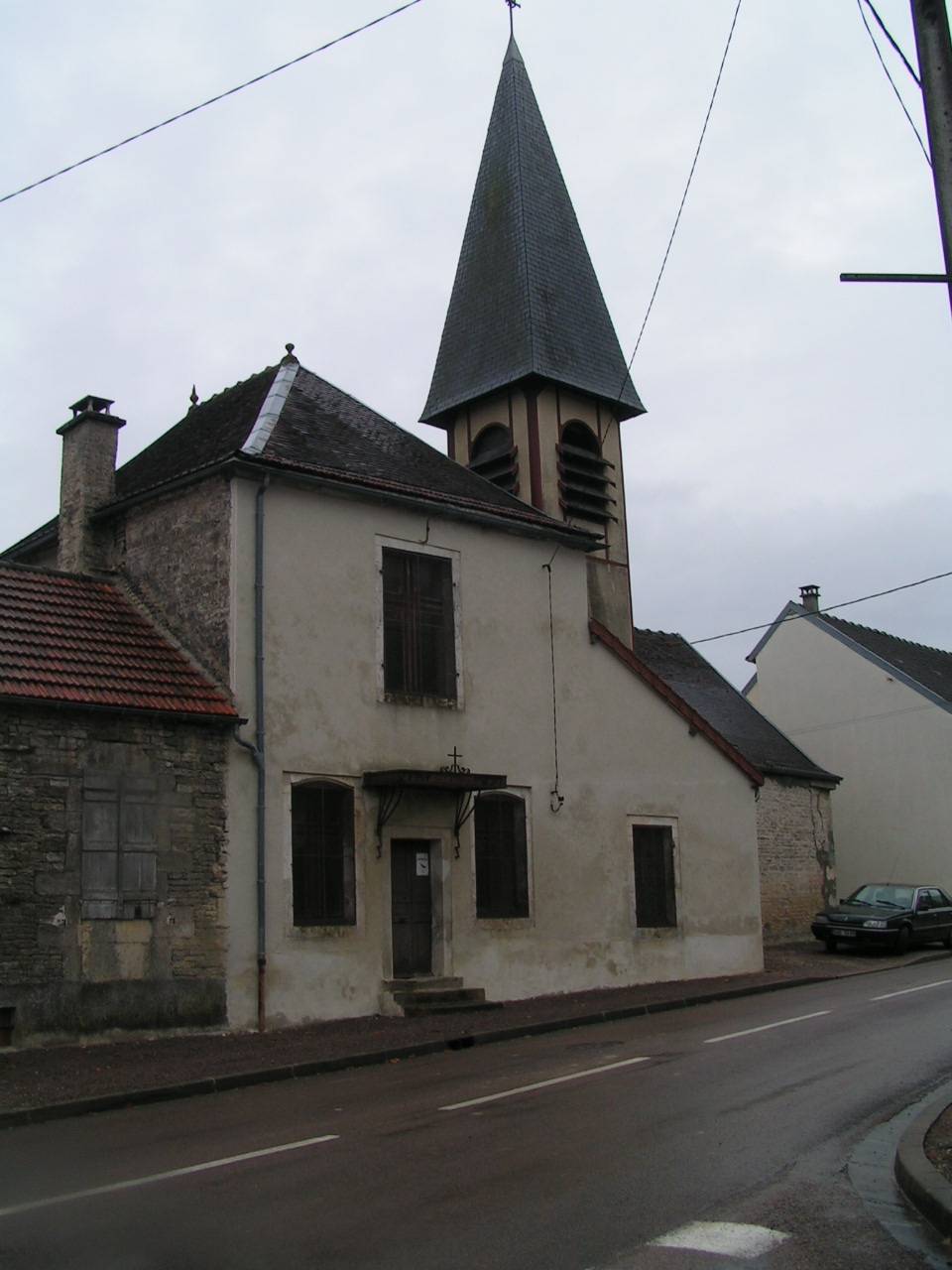
- The chapel in Arthonnay
- Location of Arthonnay
- Location within France Location within Bourgogne-Franche-Comté
- Coordinates: 47°55′59″N 4°13′50″E
- Country: France
- Region: Bourgogne-Franche-Comté
- Department: Yonne
- Arrondissement: Avallon
- Canton: Tonnerrois
- Intercommunality: CC Tonnerrois Bourgogne

Government
  - Mayor (2020–2026): Josiane Rousseau
- Area^{1}: 25.50 km^{2} (9.85 sq mi)
- Highest elevation: 353 m (1,158 ft)
- Lowest elevation: 229 m (751 ft)
- Population (2023): 150
  - Density: 5.9/km^{2} (15/sq mi)
- Time zone: UTC+01:00 (CET)
  - Summer (DST): UTC+02:00 (CEST)
- INSEE/Postal code: 89019 /89740
- ^{1} French Land Register data, which excludes lakes, ponds, glaciers > 1 km^{2} (0.386 sq mi or 247 acres) and river estuaries.

Arthonnay (French pronunciation: [aʁtɔnɛ]) is a commune in the Yonne department in Bourgogne-Franche-Comté in north-central France.

== See also ==
- Communes of the Yonne department
