= Gland, Yonne =

Gland
- Commune
- Location of Gland
- Location within France Location within Bourgogne-Franche-Comté
- Coordinates: 47°49′21″N 4°13′04″E
- Country: France
- Region: Bourgogne-Franche-Comté
- Department: Yonne
- Arrondissement: Avallon
- Canton: Tonnerrois

Government
  - Mayor (2020–2026): Sandrine Neyens
- Area^{1}: 16.67 km^{2} (6.44 sq mi)
- Highest elevation: 312 m (1,024 ft)
- Lowest elevation: 212 m (696 ft)
- Population (2023): 36
  - Density: 2.2/km^{2} (5.6/sq mi)
- Time zone: UTC+01:00 (CET)
  - Summer (DST): UTC+02:00 (CEST)
- INSEE/Postal code: 89191 /89740
- ^{1} French Land Register data, which excludes lakes, ponds, glaciers > 1 km^{2} (0.386 sq mi or 247 acres) and river estuaries.

Gland (French pronunciation: [ɡlɑ̃]) is a commune in the Yonne department in Bourgogne-Franche-Comté in north-central France.

== See also ==
- Communes of the Yonne department
