= Pimelles =

- Commune
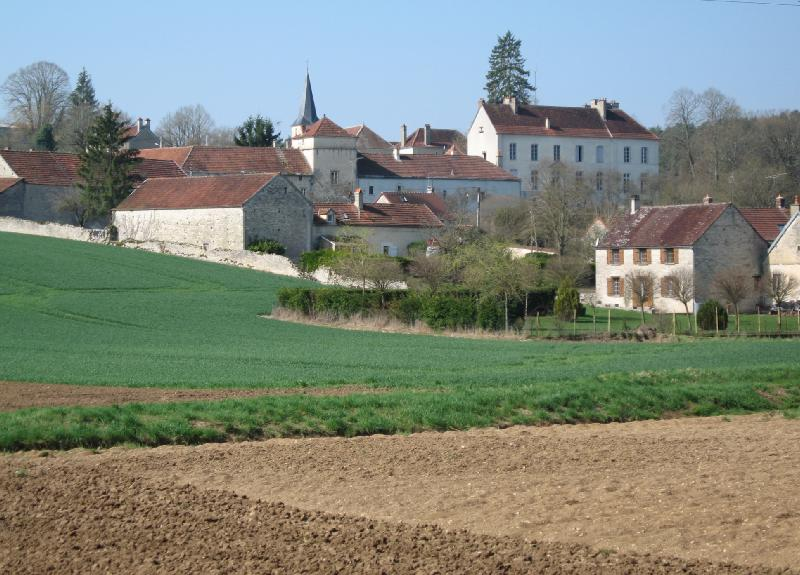
- Location of Pimelles
- Location within France Location within Bourgogne-Franche-Comté
- Coordinates: 47°50′20″N 4°10′41″E
- Country: France
- Region: Bourgogne-Franche-Comté
- Department: Yonne
- Arrondissement: Avallon
- Canton: Tonnerrois

Government
  - Mayor (2020–2026): Adrien Retif
- Area^{1}: 9.91 km^{2} (3.83 sq mi)
- Elevation: 265 m (869 ft)
- Highest elevation: 277 m (909 ft)
- Lowest elevation: 183 m (600 ft)
- Population (2023): 61
  - Density: 6.2/km^{2} (16/sq mi)
- Time zone: UTC+01:00 (CET)
  - Summer (DST): UTC+02:00 (CEST)
- INSEE/Postal code: 89299 /89740
- ^{1} French Land Register data, which excludes lakes, ponds, glaciers > 1 km^{2} (0.386 sq mi or 247 acres) and river estuaries.

Pimelles (French pronunciation: [pimɛl]) is a small village nestled in the rolling hills of the department of Yonne in Bourgogne-Franche-Comté, north-central France. Part of the canton of Tonnerrois, it covers 10 km^{2}. As of 2023, the population of the commune was 61. Its present mayor is Adrien Retif.

== History ==
The history of Pimelles dates to at least 1035, when Raynaud, the Count of Tonnerre, gave "Pimella" to the nearby Abbey of Saint Michael. The Knights Templar Commandry of Saint Mark at Nuits-sous-Ravières established a sub-commandry in Pimelles during the 14th century. A Renaissance-era bridge can be found in the center of town.

Until the French Revolution, Pimelles was the estate of the Viart family. The former Viart manor house, which was constructed around 1788, now serves as the town hall. Count Louis-Alexandre-Charles Viart de Pimelles rebuilt the village church, Our Lady of the Assumption, in 1781, shortly before the Revolution. The church contains a notable portrait of Pope Alexander III. The registered population of Pimelles at this time was 50 households focusing primarily on wood-felling, farming, and wine-growing.

The Viart family fled France during the Revolution. They were unable to reclaim the estate after the Restoration. American troops from the 80th (the Blue Ridge) Division were garrisoned in Pimelles during World War I, and traces of their graffiti can still be found on the walls of some of the houses. Of note, General "Black Jack" Pershing, the commander of the American Expeditionary Force, inspected and reviewed the entire division near Pimelles on March 26, 1919.

During World War II, La Grange-Aux-Moines, a dependency of Pimelles, served as one of the headquarters of an element of the Yonne Resistance Movement. Its members were betrayed, and shot by German occupation forces.

Modern-day Pimelles maintains its traditional agricultural character, producing wheat and rapeseed. Nearby sites include the Renaissance chateaus of Tanlay and Ancy-le-Franc and the unique pentagon-shaped château de Maulnes.

== See also ==
- Communes of the Yonne department
