= Sennevoy-le-Bas =

- Commune
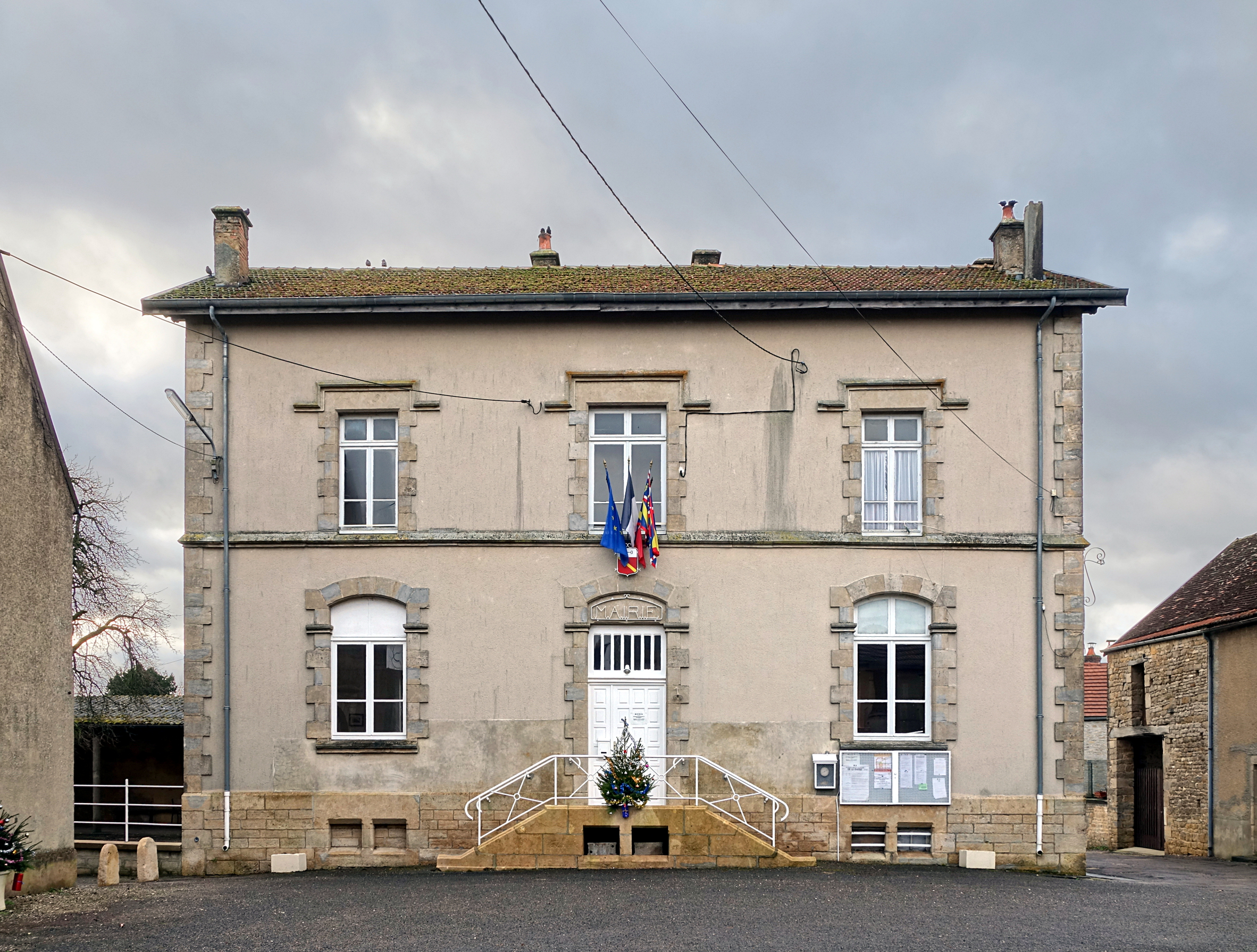
- The town hall in Sennevoy-le-Bas

- Coat of arms
- Location of Sennevoy-le-Bas
- Location within France Location within Bourgogne-Franche-Comté
- Coordinates: 47°48′25″N 4°17′30″E
- Country: France
- Region: Bourgogne-Franche-Comté
- Department: Yonne
- Arrondissement: Avallon
- Canton: Tonnerrois

Government
  - Mayor (2020–2026): Dominique Varailles
- Area^{1}: 8.69 km^{2} (3.36 sq mi)
- Highest elevation: 263 m (863 ft)
- Lowest elevation: 223 m (732 ft)
- Population (2023): 75
  - Density: 8.6/km^{2} (22/sq mi)
- Time zone: UTC+01:00 (CET)
  - Summer (DST): UTC+02:00 (CEST)
- INSEE/Postal code: 89385 /89160
- ^{1} French Land Register data, which excludes lakes, ponds, glaciers > 1 km^{2} (0.386 sq mi or 247 acres) and river estuaries.

Sennevoy-le-Bas (French pronunciation: [sɛnvwa lə ba]) is a commune in the Yonne department in Bourgogne-Franche-Comté in north-central France.

== See also ==
- Communes of the Yonne department
