= Sennevoy-le-Haut =

- Commune
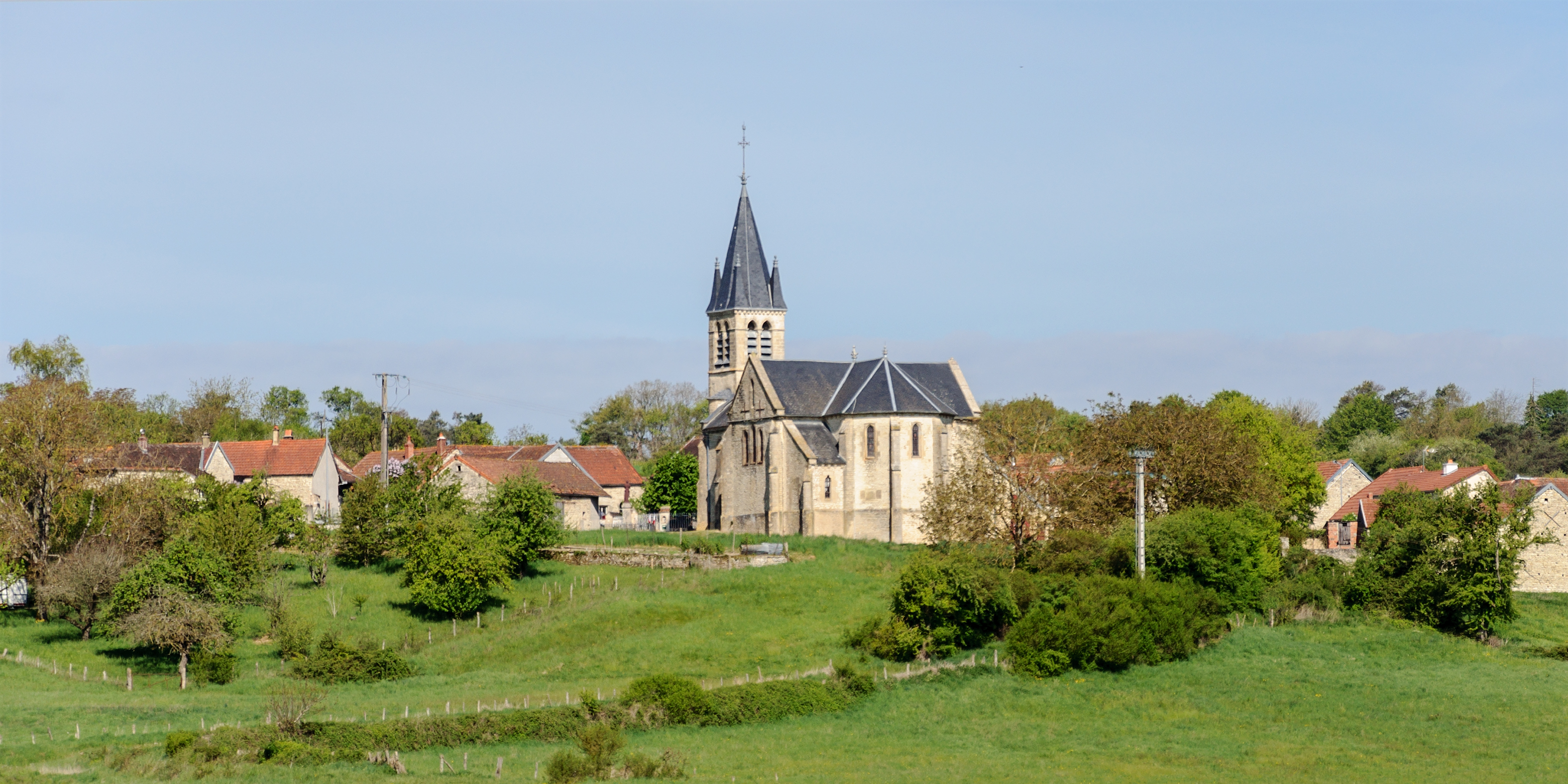
- A general view of Sennevoy-le-Haut
- Location of Sennevoy-le-Haut
- Location within France Location within Bourgogne-Franche-Comté
- Coordinates: 47°48′29″N 4°16′53″E
- Country: France
- Region: Bourgogne-Franche-Comté
- Department: Yonne
- Arrondissement: Avallon
- Canton: Tonnerrois

Government
  - Mayor (2020–2026): Jean-Louis Maronnat
- Area^{1}: 8.84 km^{2} (3.41 sq mi)
- Highest elevation: 320 m (1,050 ft)
- Lowest elevation: 238 m (781 ft)
- Population (2023): 121
  - Density: 13.7/km^{2} (35.5/sq mi)
- Time zone: UTC+01:00 (CET)
  - Summer (DST): UTC+02:00 (CEST)
- INSEE/Postal code: 89386 /89160
- ^{1} French Land Register data, which excludes lakes, ponds, glaciers > 1 km^{2} (0.386 sq mi or 247 acres) and river estuaries.

Sennevoy-le-Haut (French pronunciation: [sɛnvwa lə o]) is a commune in the Yonne department in Bourgogne-Franche-Comté in north-central France.

== See also ==
- Communes of the Yonne department
