= Gigny, Yonne =

Gigny
- Commune
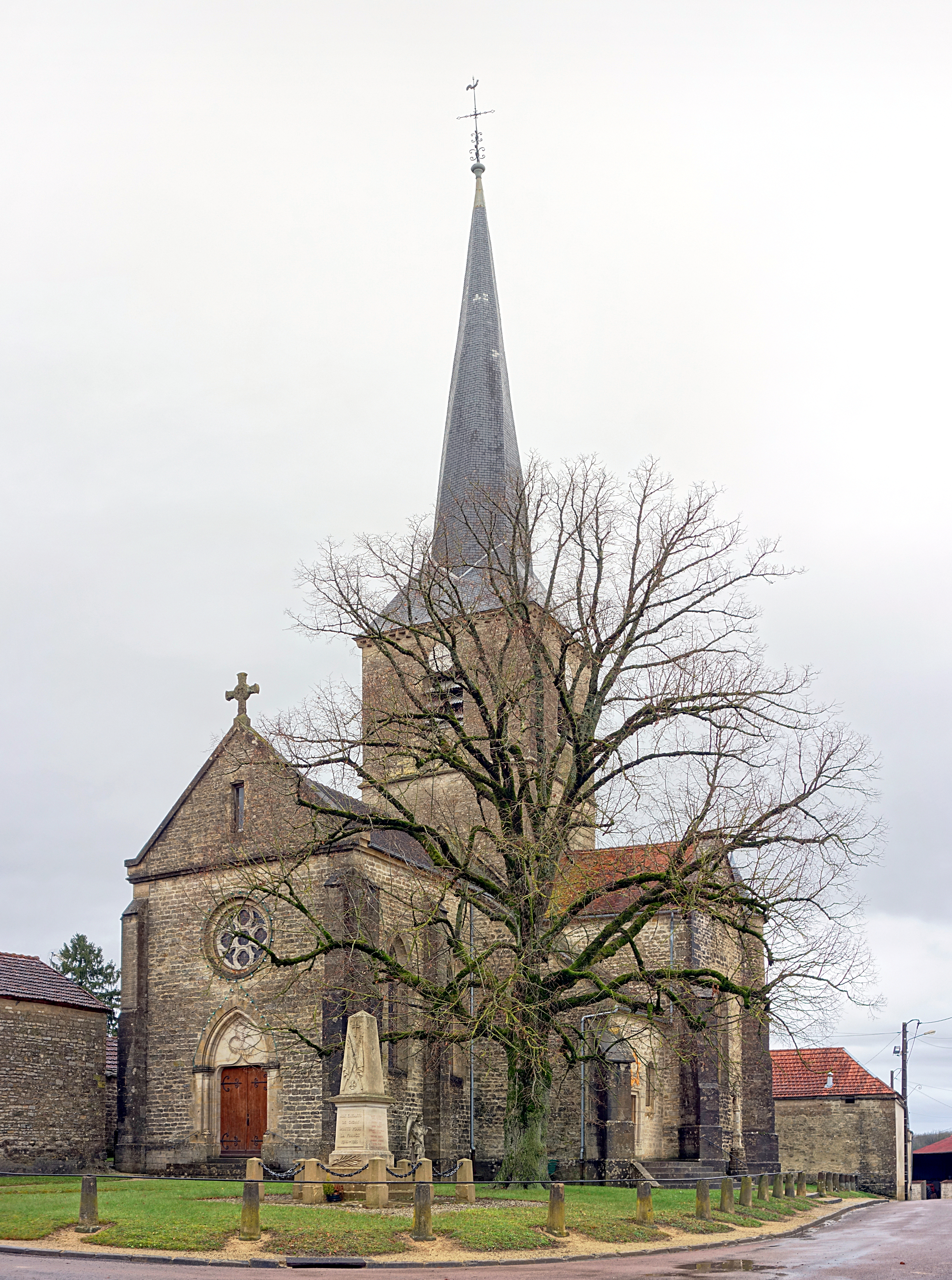
- The church in Gigny
- Location of Gigny
- Location within France Location within Bourgogne-Franche-Comté
- Coordinates: 47°49′01″N 4°17′45″E
- Country: France
- Region: Bourgogne-Franche-Comté
- Department: Yonne
- Arrondissement: Avallon
- Canton: Tonnerrois

Government
  - Mayor (2024–2026): Michel Tobiet
- Area^{1}: 10.77 km^{2} (4.16 sq mi)
- Highest elevation: 305 m (1,001 ft)
- Lowest elevation: 207 m (679 ft)
- Population (2023): 83
  - Density: 7.7/km^{2} (20/sq mi)
- Time zone: UTC+01:00 (CET)
  - Summer (DST): UTC+02:00 (CEST)
- INSEE/Postal code: 89187 /89160
- ^{1} French Land Register data, which excludes lakes, ponds, glaciers > 1 km^{2} (0.386 sq mi or 247 acres) and river estuaries.

Gigny (French pronunciation: [ʒiɲi]) is a commune in the Yonne department in Bourgogne-Franche-Comté in north-central France.

== See also ==
- Communes of the Yonne department
