= Sambourg =

- Commune
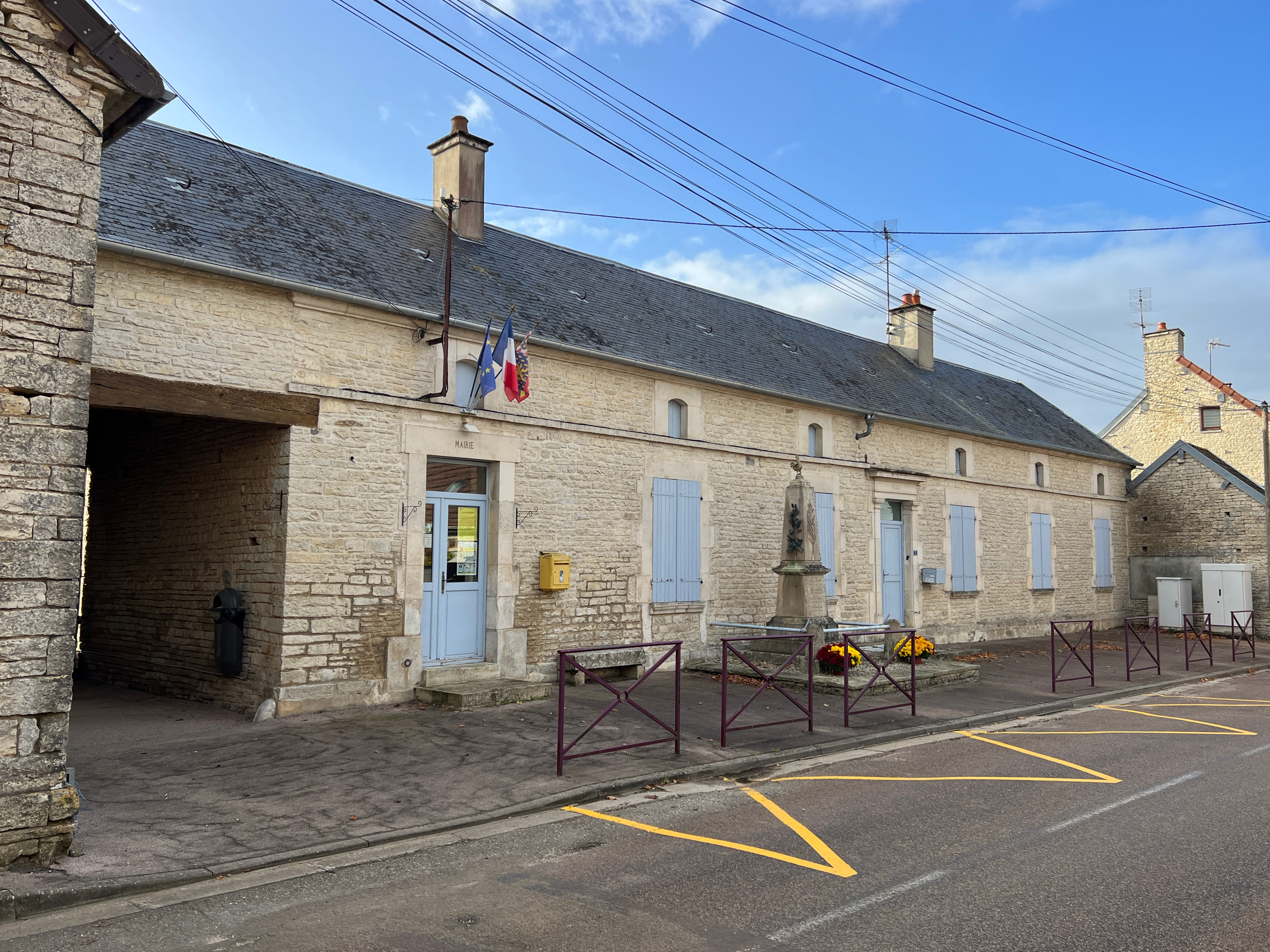
- Sambourg Town hall
- Location of Sambourg
- Location within France Location within Bourgogne-Franche-Comté
- Coordinates: 47°46′07″N 4°01′23″E
- Country: France
- Region: Bourgogne-Franche-Comté
- Department: Yonne
- Arrondissement: Avallon
- Canton: Tonnerrois

Government
  - Mayor (2020–2026): Stéphane Paris
- Area^{1}: 12.44 km^{2} (4.80 sq mi)
- Highest elevation: 265 m (869 ft)
- Lowest elevation: 188 m (617 ft)
- Population (2023): 63
  - Density: 5.1/km^{2} (13/sq mi)
- Time zone: UTC+01:00 (CET)
  - Summer (DST): UTC+02:00 (CEST)
- INSEE/Postal code: 89374 /89160
- ^{1} French Land Register data, which excludes lakes, ponds, glaciers > 1 km^{2} (0.386 sq mi or 247 acres) and river estuaries.

Sambourg (French pronunciation: [sɑ̃buʁ]) is a commune in the Yonne department in Bourgogne-Franche-Comté in north-central France.

== See also ==
- Communes of the Yonne department
