= Trichey =

- Commune
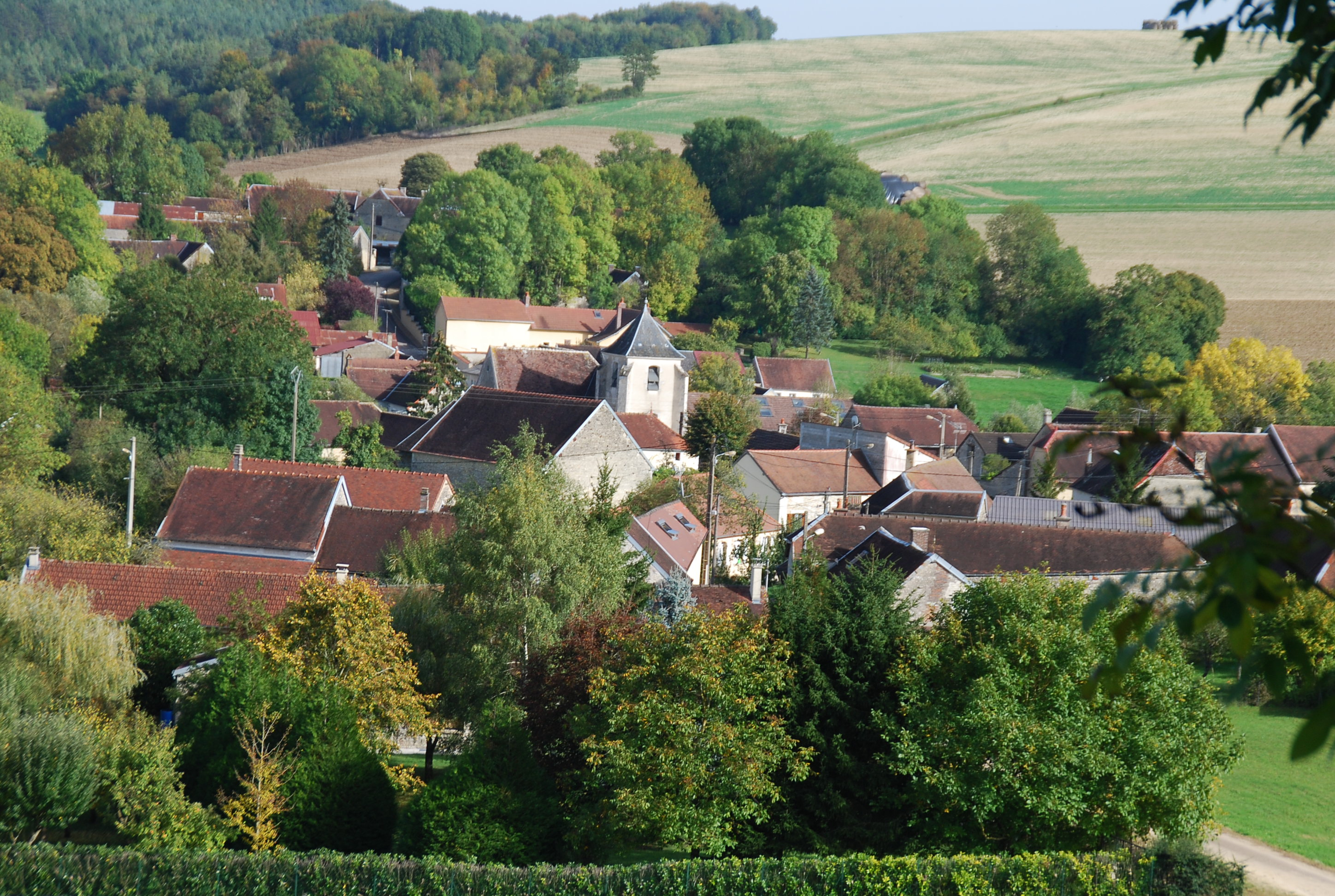
- A general view of Trichey
- Location of Trichey
- Location within France Location within Bourgogne-Franche-Comté
- Coordinates: 47°55′52″N 4°08′29″E
- Country: France
- Region: Bourgogne-Franche-Comté
- Department: Yonne
- Arrondissement: Avallon
- Canton: Tonnerrois

Government
  - Mayor (2020–2026): Delphine Griffon
- Area^{1}: 6.61 km^{2} (2.55 sq mi)
- Highest elevation: 343 m (1,125 ft)
- Lowest elevation: 225 m (738 ft)
- Population (2023): 42
  - Density: 6.4/km^{2} (16/sq mi)
- Time zone: UTC+01:00 (CET)
  - Summer (DST): UTC+02:00 (CEST)
- INSEE/Postal code: 89422 /89430
- ^{1} French Land Register data, which excludes lakes, ponds, glaciers > 1 km^{2} (0.386 sq mi or 247 acres) and river estuaries.

Trichey (French pronunciation: [tʁiʃɛ]) is a commune in the Yonne department in Bourgogne-Franche-Comté in north-central France.

== See also ==
- Communes of the Yonne department
