= Saint-Martin-sur-Armançon =

- Commune
- Location of Saint-Martin-sur-Armançon
- Location within France Location within Bourgogne-Franche-Comté
- Coordinates: 47°52′24″N 4°04′13″E
- Country: France
- Region: Bourgogne-Franche-Comté
- Department: Yonne
- Arrondissement: Avallon
- Canton: Tonnerrois

Government
  - Mayor (2020–2026): Benjamin Lemaire
- Area^{1}: 14.11 km^{2} (5.45 sq mi)
- Highest elevation: 277 m (909 ft)
- Lowest elevation: 139 m (456 ft)
- Population (2023): 138
  - Density: 9.78/km^{2} (25.3/sq mi)
- Time zone: UTC+01:00 (CET)
  - Summer (DST): UTC+02:00 (CEST)
- INSEE/Postal code: 89355 /89700
- ^{1} French Land Register data, which excludes lakes, ponds, glaciers > 1 km^{2} (0.386 sq mi or 247 acres) and river estuaries.

Saint-Martin-sur-Armançon (French pronunciation: [sɛ̃ maʁtɛ̃ syʁ aʁmɑ̃sɔ̃], literally Saint-Martin on Armançon) is a commune in the Yonne department in Bourgogne-Franche-Comté in north-central France.

== See also ==
- Communes of the Yonne department
