= Thorey =

- Commune
- Coat of arms
- Location of Thorey
- Location within France Location within Bourgogne-Franche-Comté
- Coordinates: 47°54′15″N 4°07′23″E
- Country: France
- Region: Bourgogne-Franche-Comté
- Department: Yonne
- Arrondissement: Avallon
- Canton: Tonnerrois

Government
  - Mayor (2020–2026): Régis Nicolle
- Area^{1}: 6.93 km^{2} (2.68 sq mi)
- Elevation: 308 m (1,010 ft)
- Highest elevation: 336 m (1,102 ft)
- Lowest elevation: 182 m (597 ft)
- Population (2023): 44
  - Density: 6.3/km^{2} (16/sq mi)
- Time zone: UTC+01:00 (CET)
  - Summer (DST): UTC+02:00 (CEST)
- INSEE/Postal code: 89413 /89430
- ^{1} French Land Register data, which excludes lakes, ponds, glaciers > 1 km^{2} (0.386 sq mi or 247 acres) and river estuaries.

Thorey (French pronunciation: [tɔʁɛ]) is a commune in the Yonne department in Bourgogne-Franche-Comté in north-central France.

== See also ==
- Communes of the Yonne department
