= Argenteuil-sur-Armançon =

- Commune
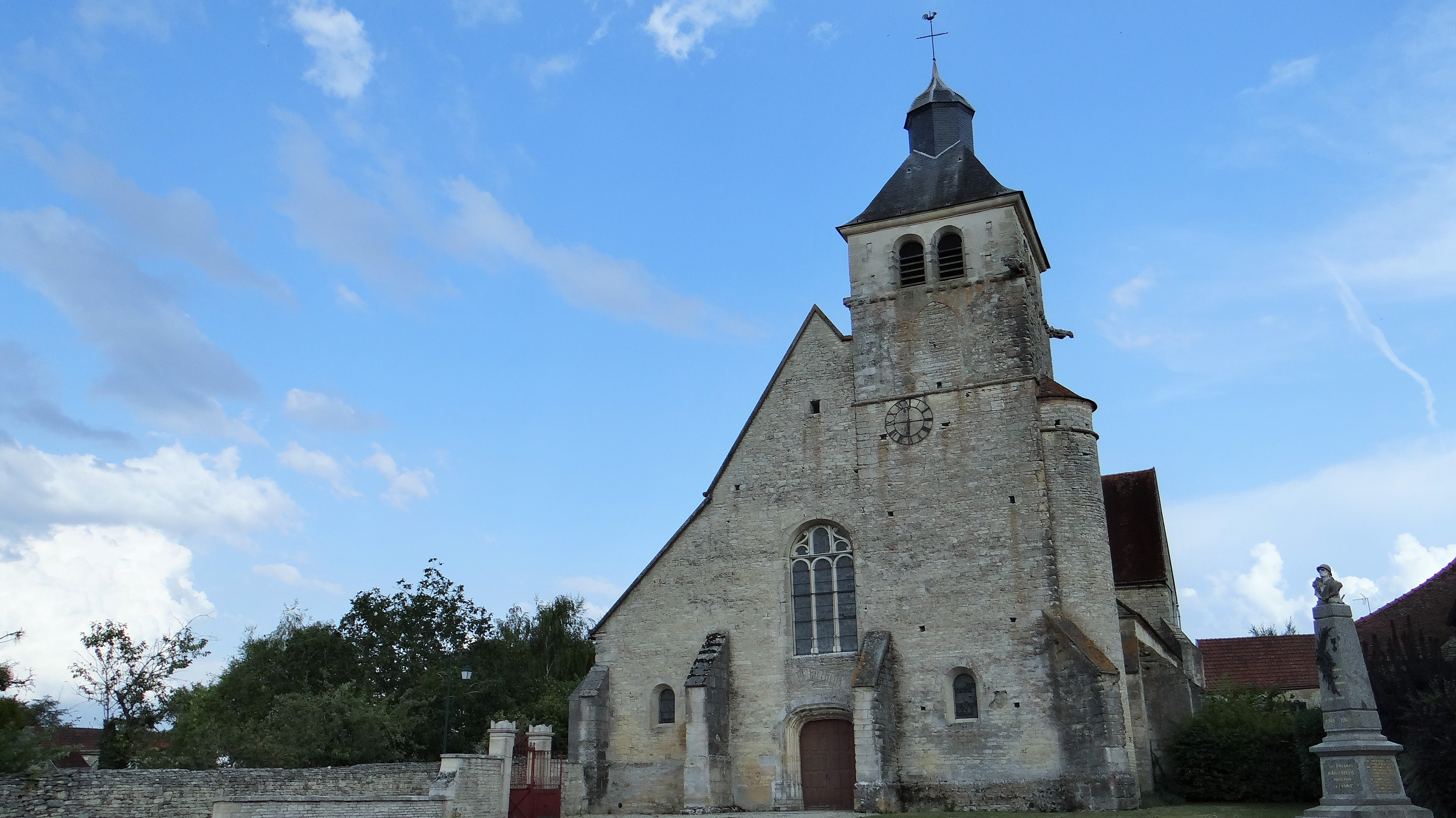
- The church in Argenteuil-sur-Armançon
- Location of Argenteuil-sur-Armançon
- Location within France Location within Bourgogne-Franche-Comté
- Coordinates: 47°45′04″N 4°06′30″E
- Country: France
- Region: Bourgogne-Franche-Comté
- Department: Yonne
- Arrondissement: Avallon
- Canton: Tonnerrois
- Intercommunality: CC Tonnerrois Bourgogne

Government
  - Mayor (2020–2026): Patrice Munier
- Area^{1}: 30.51 km^{2} (11.78 sq mi)
- Highest elevation: 289 m (948 ft)
- Lowest elevation: 165 m (541 ft)
- Population (2023): 219
  - Density: 7.18/km^{2} (18.6/sq mi)
- Time zone: UTC+01:00 (CET)
  - Summer (DST): UTC+02:00 (CEST)
- INSEE/Postal code: 89017 /89160
- ^{1} French Land Register data, which excludes lakes, ponds, glaciers > 1 km^{2} (0.386 sq mi or 247 acres) and river estuaries.

Argenteuil-sur-Armançon (French pronunciation: [aʁʒɑ̃tœj syʁ aʁmɑ̃sɔ̃], literally Argenteuil on Armançon) is a commune in the Yonne department in Bourgogne-Franche-Comté in north-central France.

== See also ==
- Communes of the Yonne department
