= Canton of Tonnerrois =

Coordinates: 47.86°N 3.97°E

The canton of Tonnerrois is an administrative division of the Yonne department, central France. It was created at the French canton reorganisation which came into effect in March 2015. Its seat is in Tonnerre.

It consists of the following communes:

1. Aisy-sur-Armançon
2. Ancy-le-Franc
3. Ancy-le-Libre
4. Argentenay
5. Argenteuil-sur-Armançon
6. Arthonnay
7. Baon
8. Bernouil
9. Chassignelles
10. Cheney
11. Collan
12. Cruzy-le-Châtel
13. Cry
14. Dannemoine
15. Dyé
16. Épineuil
17. Flogny-la-Chapelle
18. Fulvy
19. Gigny
20. Gland
21. Jully
22. Junay
23. Lézinnes
24. Mélisey
25. Molosmes
26. Nuits
27. Pacy-sur-Armançon
28. Perrigny-sur-Armançon
29. Pimelles
30. Quincerot
31. Ravières
32. Roffey
33. Rugny
34. Saint-Martin-sur-Armançon
35. Sambourg
36. Sennevoy-le-Bas
37. Sennevoy-le-Haut
38. Serrigny
39. Stigny
40. Tanlay
41. Thorey
42. Tissey
43. Tonnerre
44. Trichey
45. Tronchoy
46. Vézannes
47. Vézinnes
48. Villiers-les-Hauts
49. Villon
50. Vireaux
51. Viviers
52. Yrouerre
