= Tronchoy =

- Commune
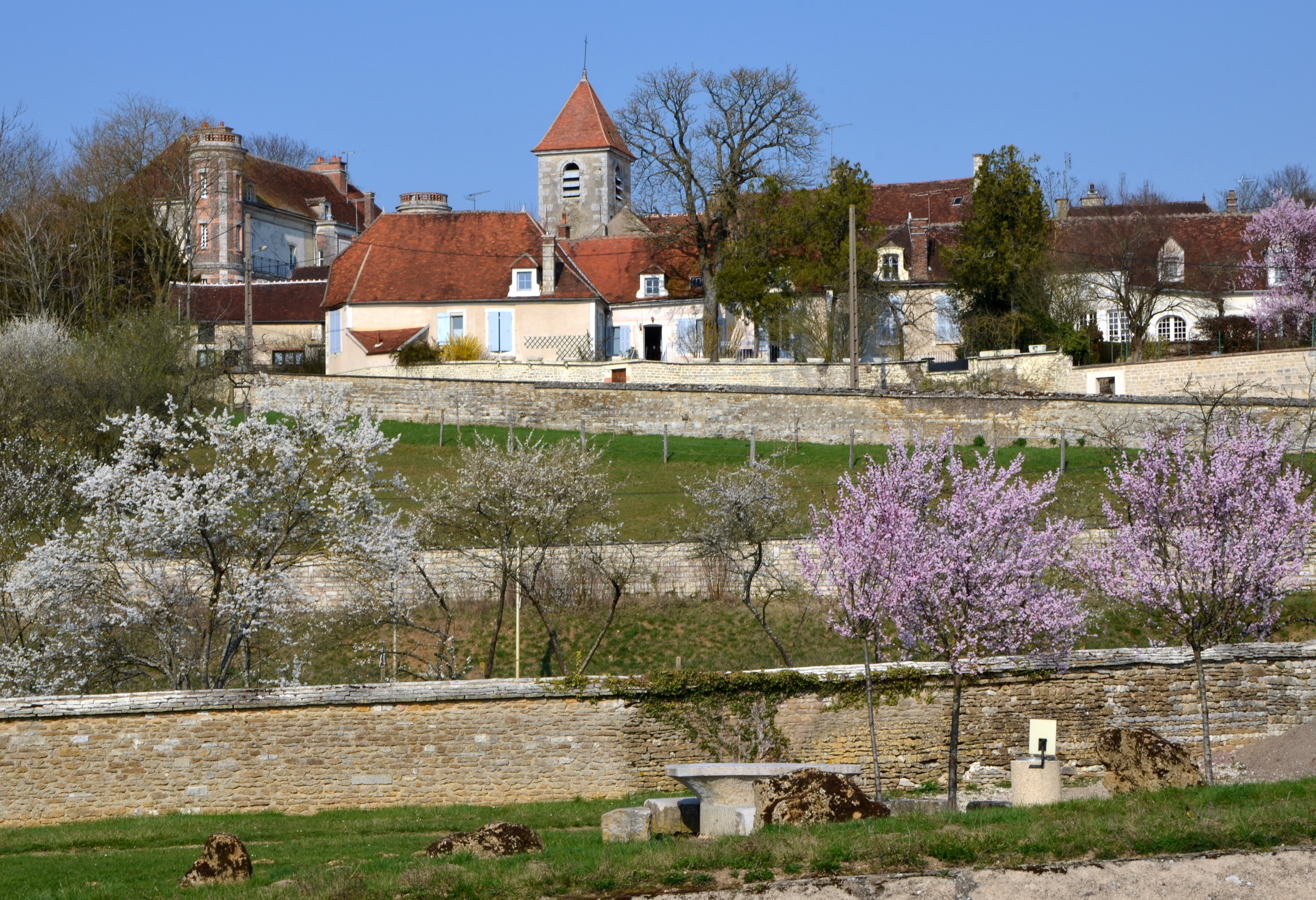
- The church and surroundings in Tronchoy
- Location of Tronchoy
- Location within France Location within Bourgogne-Franche-Comté
- Coordinates: 47°54′54″N 3°56′31″E
- Country: France
- Region: Bourgogne-Franche-Comté
- Department: Yonne
- Arrondissement: Avallon
- Canton: Tonnerrois

Government
  - Mayor (2020–2026): Jacques Tribut
- Area^{1}: 6.59 km^{2} (2.54 sq mi)
- Highest elevation: 228 m (748 ft)
- Lowest elevation: 123 m (404 ft)
- Population (2023): 119
  - Density: 18.1/km^{2} (46.8/sq mi)
- Time zone: UTC+01:00 (CET)
  - Summer (DST): UTC+02:00 (CEST)
- INSEE/Postal code: 89423 /89700
- ^{1} French Land Register data, which excludes lakes, ponds, glaciers > 1 km^{2} (0.386 sq mi or 247 acres) and river estuaries.

Tronchoy (French pronunciation: [tʁɔ̃ʃwa]) is a commune in the Yonne department in Bourgogne-Franche-Comté in north-central France.

== See also ==
- Communes of the Yonne department
