= Serrigny =

- Commune
- Coat of arms
- Location of Serrigny
- Location within France Location within Bourgogne-Franche-Comté
- Coordinates: 47°50′10″N 3°54′53″E
- Country: France
- Region: Bourgogne-Franche-Comté
- Department: Yonne
- Arrondissement: Avallon
- Canton: Tonnerrois
- Area^{1}: 7.50 km^{2} (2.90 sq mi)
- Highest elevation: 326 m (1,070 ft)
- Lowest elevation: 195 m (640 ft)
- Population (2023): 112
  - Density: 14.9/km^{2} (38.7/sq mi)
- Time zone: UTC+01:00 (CET)
  - Summer (DST): UTC+02:00 (CEST)
- INSEE/Postal code: 89393 /89700
- ^{1} French Land Register data, which excludes lakes, ponds, glaciers > 1 km^{2} (0.386 sq mi or 247 acres) and river estuaries.

Serrigny (French pronunciation: [seʁiɲi]) is a commune in the Yonne department in Bourgogne-Franche-Comté in north-central France.

== See also ==
- Communes of the Yonne department
