= Vézinnes =

- Commune
- Location of Vézinnes
- Location within France Location within Bourgogne-Franche-Comté
- Coordinates: 47°53′36″N 3°56′39″E
- Country: France
- Region: Bourgogne-Franche-Comté
- Department: Yonne
- Arrondissement: Avallon
- Canton: Tonnerrois

Government
  - Mayor (2024–2026): Philippe Pacault
- Area^{1}: 6.30 km^{2} (2.43 sq mi)
- Highest elevation: 274 m (899 ft)
- Lowest elevation: 126 m (413 ft)
- Population (2023): 158
  - Density: 25.1/km^{2} (65.0/sq mi)
- Time zone: UTC+01:00 (CET)
  - Summer (DST): UTC+02:00 (CEST)
- INSEE/Postal code: 89447 /89700
- ^{1} French Land Register data, which excludes lakes, ponds, glaciers > 1 km^{2} (0.386 sq mi or 247 acres) and river estuaries.

Vézinnes (French pronunciation: [vezin]) is a commune in the Yonne department in Bourgogne-Franche-Comté in north-central France.

== See also ==
- Communes of the Yonne department
