= Yrouerre =

- Commune
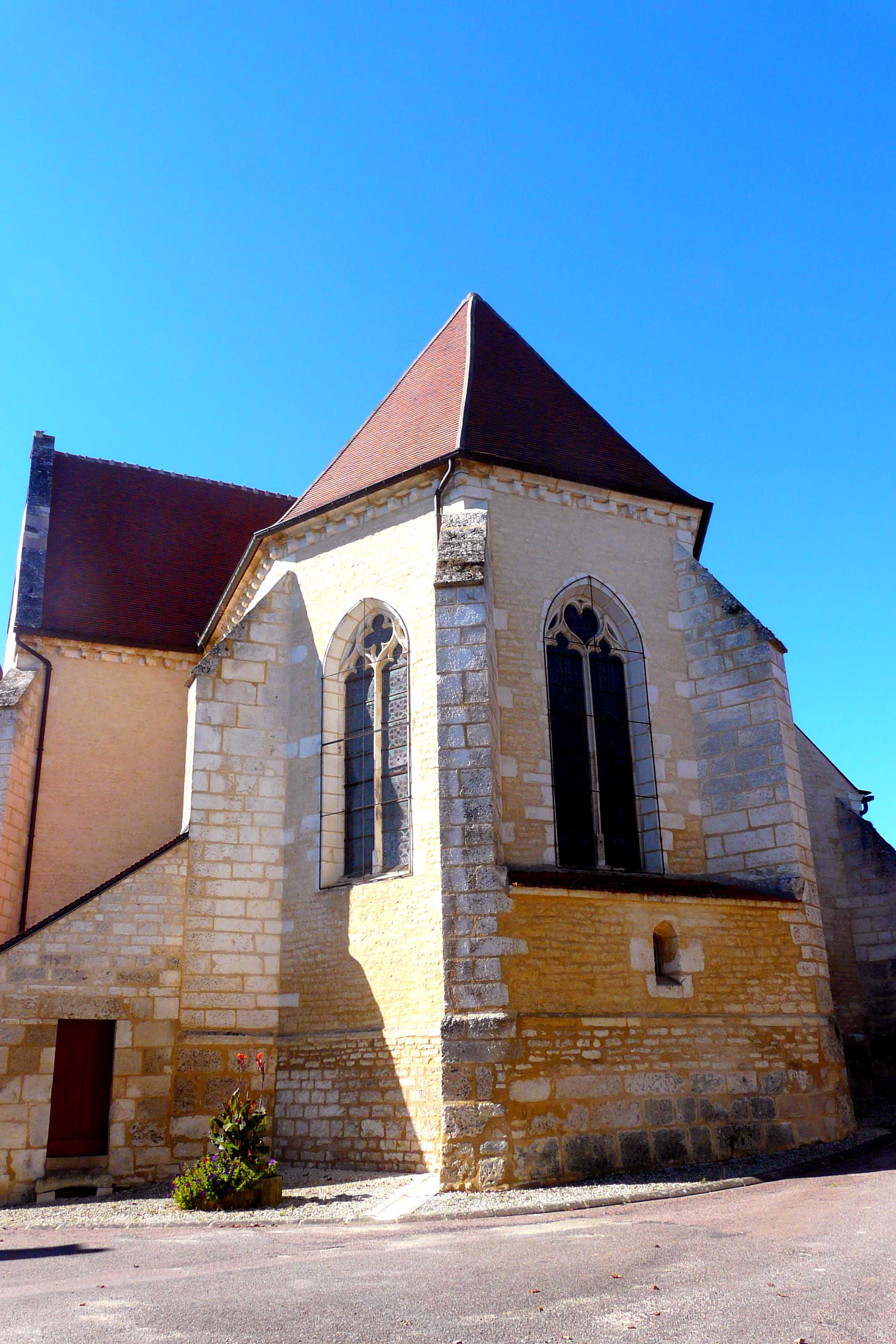
- The church in Yrouerre

- Coat of arms
- Location of Yrouerre
- Location within France Location within Bourgogne-Franche-Comté
- Coordinates: 47°47′41″N 3°56′56″E
- Country: France
- Region: Bourgogne-Franche-Comté
- Department: Yonne
- Arrondissement: Avallon
- Canton: Tonnerrois
- Intercommunality: Le Tonnerrois en Bourgogne

Government
  - Mayor (2020–2026): Maurice Pianon
- Area^{1}: 14.28 km^{2} (5.51 sq mi)
- Highest elevation: 331 m (1,086 ft)
- Lowest elevation: 205 m (673 ft)
- Population (2023): 144
  - Density: 10.1/km^{2} (26.1/sq mi)
- Time zone: UTC+01:00 (CET)
  - Summer (DST): UTC+02:00 (CEST)
- INSEE/Postal code: 89486 /89700
- ^{1} French Land Register data, which excludes lakes, ponds, glaciers > 1 km^{2} (0.386 sq mi or 247 acres) and river estuaries.

Yrouerre (French pronunciation: [iʁwɛʁ]) is a commune in the Yonne department in Bourgogne-Franche-Comté in north-central France.

== Population ==
Historical population
Year	Pop.	±% p.a.
1968	161	—
1975	152	−0.82%
1982	136	−1.58%
1990	161	+2.13%
1999	197	+2.27%
2007	203	+0.38%
2012	182	−2.16%
2017	159	−2.67%
2023	144	−1.64%
Source: INSEE

== See also ==
- Communes of the Yonne department
