= Baon =

- Commune
- Location of Baon
- Location within France Location within Bourgogne-Franche-Comté
- Coordinates: 47°51′35″N 4°08′01″E
- Country: France
- Region: Bourgogne-Franche-Comté
- Department: Yonne
- Arrondissement: Avallon
- Canton: Tonnerrois
- Area^{1}: 8.57 km^{2} (3.31 sq mi)
- Highest elevation: 280 m (920 ft)
- Lowest elevation: 162 m (531 ft)
- Population (2023): 58
  - Density: 6.8/km^{2} (18/sq mi)
- Time zone: UTC+01:00 (CET)
  - Summer (DST): UTC+02:00 (CEST)
- INSEE/Postal code: 89028 /89430
- ^{1} French Land Register data, which excludes lakes, ponds, glaciers > 1 km^{2} (0.386 sq mi or 247 acres) and river estuaries.

Baon is a commune in the Yonne department in Bourgogne-Franche-Comté in north-central France.

== See also ==
- Communes of the Yonne department
