= Chassignelles =

- Commune
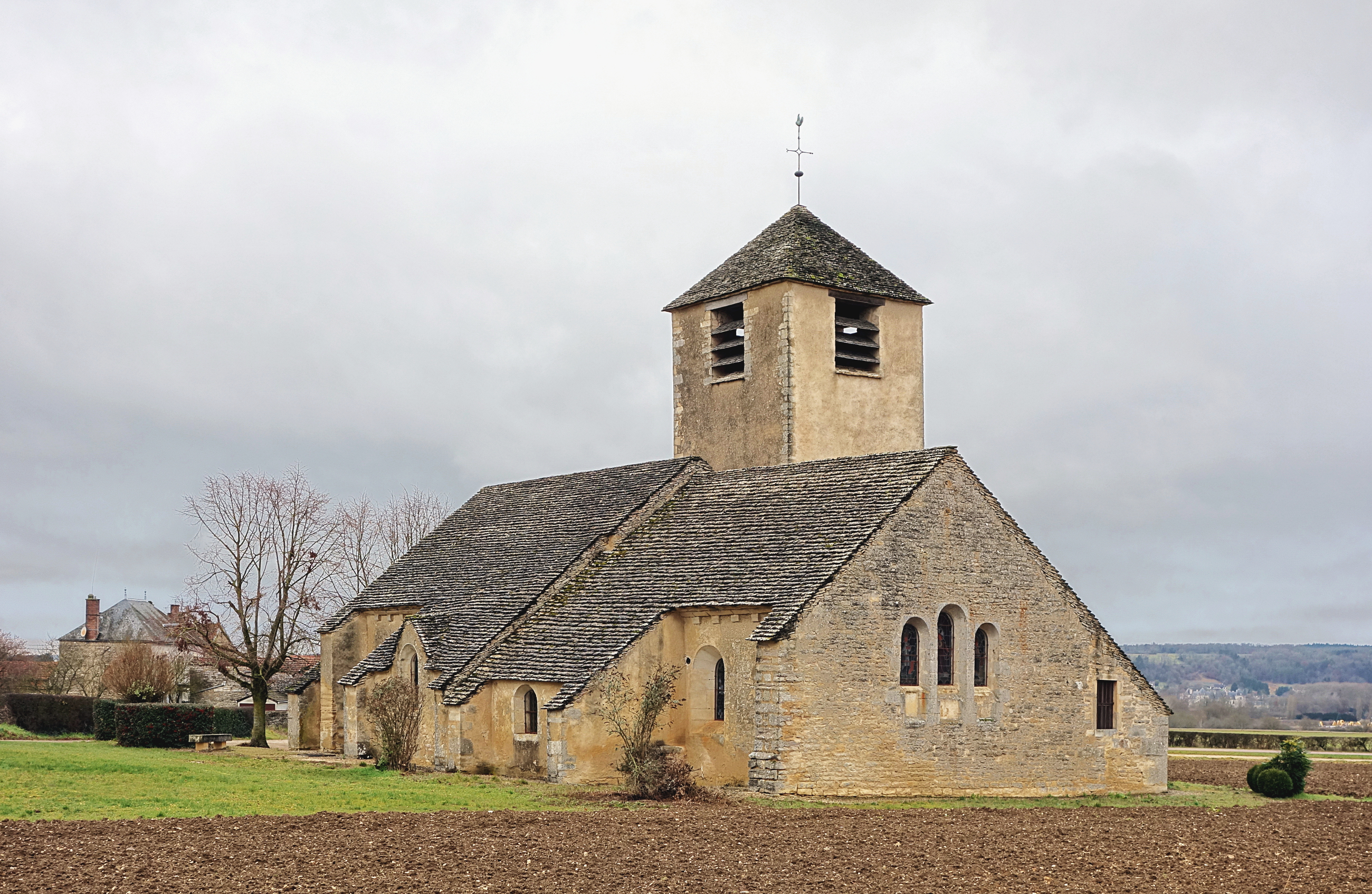
- The church in Chassignelles

- Coat of arms
- Location of Chassignelles
- Location within France Location within Bourgogne-Franche-Comté
- Coordinates: 47°45′36″N 4°10′43″E
- Country: France
- Region: Bourgogne-Franche-Comté
- Department: Yonne
- Arrondissement: Avallon
- Canton: Tonnerrois

Government
  - Mayor (2020–2026): Anne Jerusalem
- Area^{1}: 13.00 km^{2} (5.02 sq mi)
- Highest elevation: 307 m (1,007 ft)
- Lowest elevation: 172 m (564 ft)
- Population (2023): 289
  - Density: 22.2/km^{2} (57.6/sq mi)
- Time zone: UTC+01:00 (CET)
  - Summer (DST): UTC+02:00 (CEST)
- INSEE/Postal code: 89087 /89160
- ^{1} French Land Register data, which excludes lakes, ponds, glaciers > 1 km^{2} (0.386 sq mi or 247 acres) and river estuaries.

Chassignelles (French pronunciation: [ʃasiɲɛl]) is a commune in the Yonne department in Bourgogne-Franche-Comté in north-central France.

== See also ==
- Communes of the Yonne department
