= Aisy-sur-Armançon =

- Commune
- Location of Aisy-sur-Armançon
- Location within France Location within Bourgogne-Franche-Comté
- Coordinates: 47°40′06″N 4°13′34″E
- Country: France
- Region: Bourgogne-Franche-Comté
- Department: Yonne
- Arrondissement: Avallon
- Canton: Tonnerrois
- Intercommunality: Tonnerrois en Bourgogne

Government
  - Mayor (2020–2026): Olivier Murat
- Area^{1}: 17.97 km^{2} (6.94 sq mi)
- Highest elevation: 346 m (1,135 ft)
- Lowest elevation: 192 m (630 ft)
- Population (2023): 232
  - Density: 12.9/km^{2} (33.4/sq mi)
- Time zone: UTC+01:00 (CET)
  - Summer (DST): UTC+02:00 (CEST)
- INSEE/Postal code: 89004 /89390
- ^{1} French Land Register data, which excludes lakes, ponds, glaciers > 1 km^{2} (0.386 sq mi or 247 acres) and river estuaries.

Aisy-sur-Armançon (French pronunciation: [ɛzi syʁ aʁmɑ̃sɔ̃], literally Aisy on Armançon) is a commune in the Yonne department in Bourgogne-Franche-Comté in north-central France.

== Population ==
Historical population
Year	Pop.	±% p.a.
1968	402	—
1975	352	−1.88%
1982	308	−1.89%
1990	278	−1.27%
1999	277	−0.04%
2007	267	−0.46%
2012	257	−0.76%
2017	245	−0.95%
2023	232	−0.90%
Source: INSEE

== See also ==
- Communes of the Yonne department
