= Flogny-la-Chapelle =

- Commune
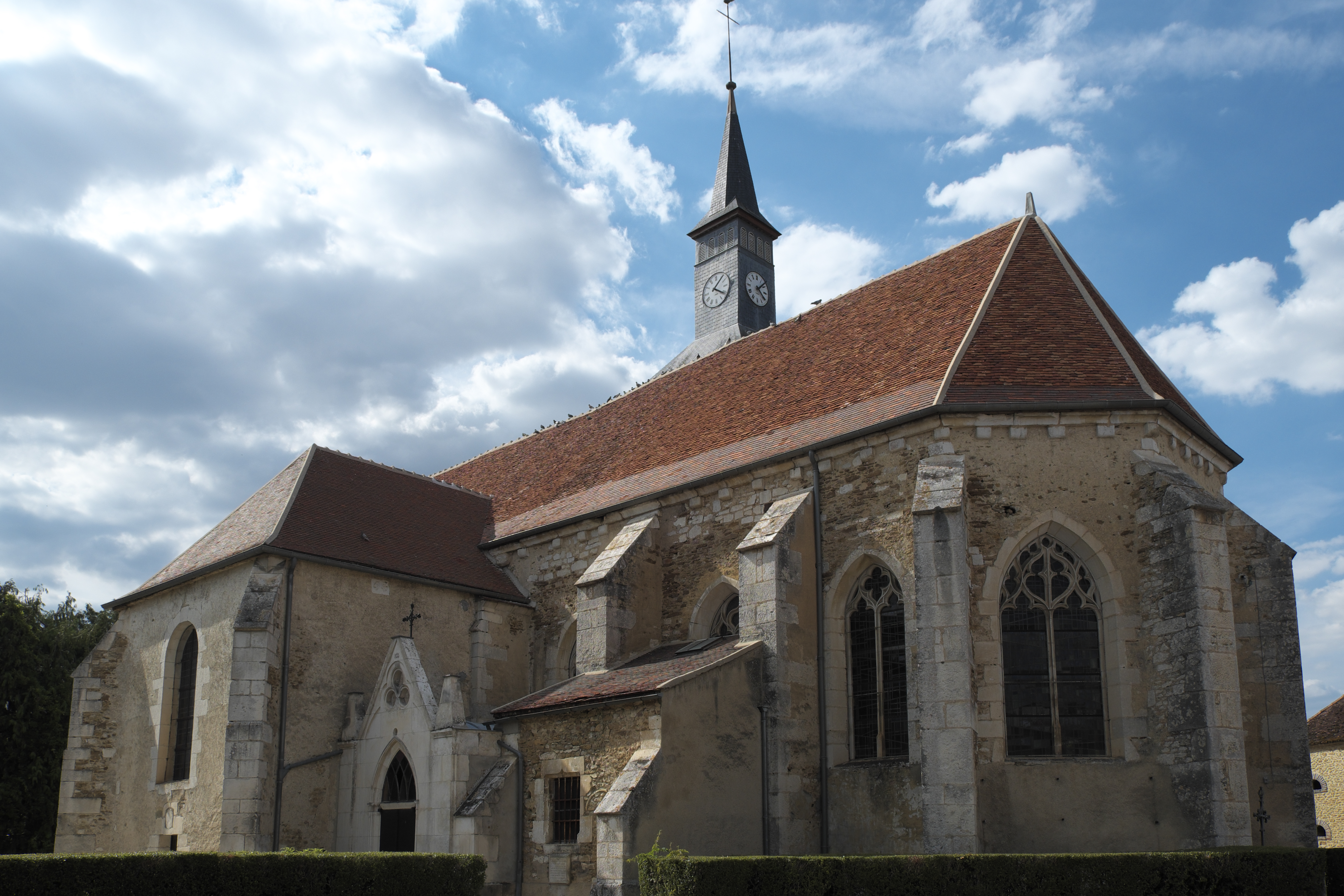
- The church in Flogny-la-Chapelle

- Coat of arms
- Location of Flogny-la-Chapelle
- Location within France Location within Bourgogne-Franche-Comté
- Coordinates: 47°57′11″N 3°52′23″E
- Country: France
- Region: Bourgogne-Franche-Comté
- Department: Yonne
- Arrondissement: Avallon
- Canton: Tonnerrois

Government
  - Mayor (2024–2026): Franck Mansanti
- Area^{1}: 23.75 km^{2} (9.17 sq mi)
- Highest elevation: 183 m (600 ft)
- Lowest elevation: 112 m (367 ft)
- Population (2023): 935
  - Density: 39.4/km^{2} (102/sq mi)
- Time zone: UTC+01:00 (CET)
  - Summer (DST): UTC+02:00 (CEST)
- INSEE/Postal code: 89169 /89360
- ^{1} French Land Register data, which excludes lakes, ponds, glaciers > 1 km^{2} (0.386 sq mi or 247 acres) and river estuaries.

Flogny-la-Chapelle (French pronunciation: [flɔɲi la ʃapɛl]) is a commune in the Yonne department in Bourgogne-Franche-Comté in north-central France.

== See also ==
- Communes of the Yonne department
