= Mélisey, Yonne =

Mélisey
- Commune
- Location of Mélisey
- Location within France Location within Bourgogne-Franche-Comté
- Coordinates: 47°54′59″N 4°04′45″E
- Country: France
- Region: Bourgogne-Franche-Comté
- Department: Yonne
- Arrondissement: Avallon
- Canton: Tonnerrois

Government
  - Mayor (2020–2026): Michel Bouchard
- Area^{1}: 22.17 km^{2} (8.56 sq mi)
- Highest elevation: 320 m (1,050 ft)
- Lowest elevation: 196 m (643 ft)
- Population (2023): 223
  - Density: 10.1/km^{2} (26.1/sq mi)
- Time zone: UTC+01:00 (CET)
  - Summer (DST): UTC+02:00 (CEST)
- INSEE/Postal code: 89247 /89430
- ^{1} French Land Register data, which excludes lakes, ponds, glaciers > 1 km^{2} (0.386 sq mi or 247 acres) and river estuaries.

Mélisey (French pronunciation: [melizɛ]) is a commune in the Yonne department in Bourgogne-Franche-Comté in north-central France.

== See also ==
- Communes of the Yonne department
