= Ravières =

- Commune
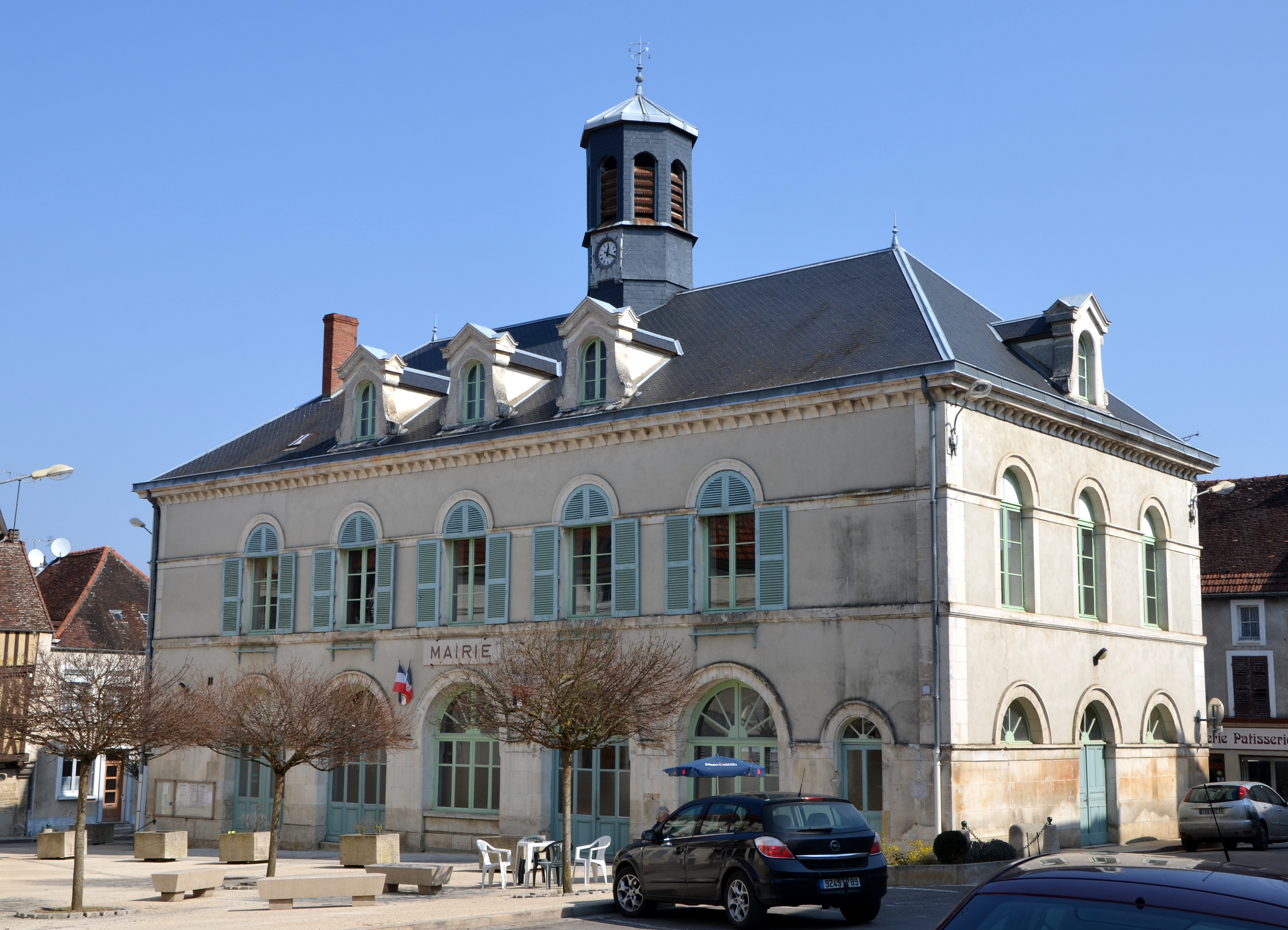
- The town hall in Ravières
- Location of Ravières
- Location within France Location within Bourgogne-Franche-Comté
- Coordinates: 47°44′07″N 4°13′43″E
- Country: France
- Region: Bourgogne-Franche-Comté
- Department: Yonne
- Arrondissement: Avallon
- Canton: Tonnerrois

Government
  - Mayor (2020–2026): Bruno Letienne
- Area^{1}: 21.85 km^{2} (8.44 sq mi)
- Highest elevation: 293 m (961 ft)
- Lowest elevation: 179 m (587 ft)
- Population (2023): 735
  - Density: 33.6/km^{2} (87.1/sq mi)
- Time zone: UTC+01:00 (CET)
  - Summer (DST): UTC+02:00 (CEST)
- INSEE/Postal code: 89321 /89390
- ^{1} French Land Register data, which excludes lakes, ponds, glaciers > 1 km^{2} (0.386 sq mi or 247 acres) and river estuaries.

Ravières (French pronunciation: [ʁavjɛʁ]) is a commune in the Yonne department in Bourgogne-Franche-Comté in north-central France.

== See also ==
- Communes of the Yonne department
