= Collan =

- Commune
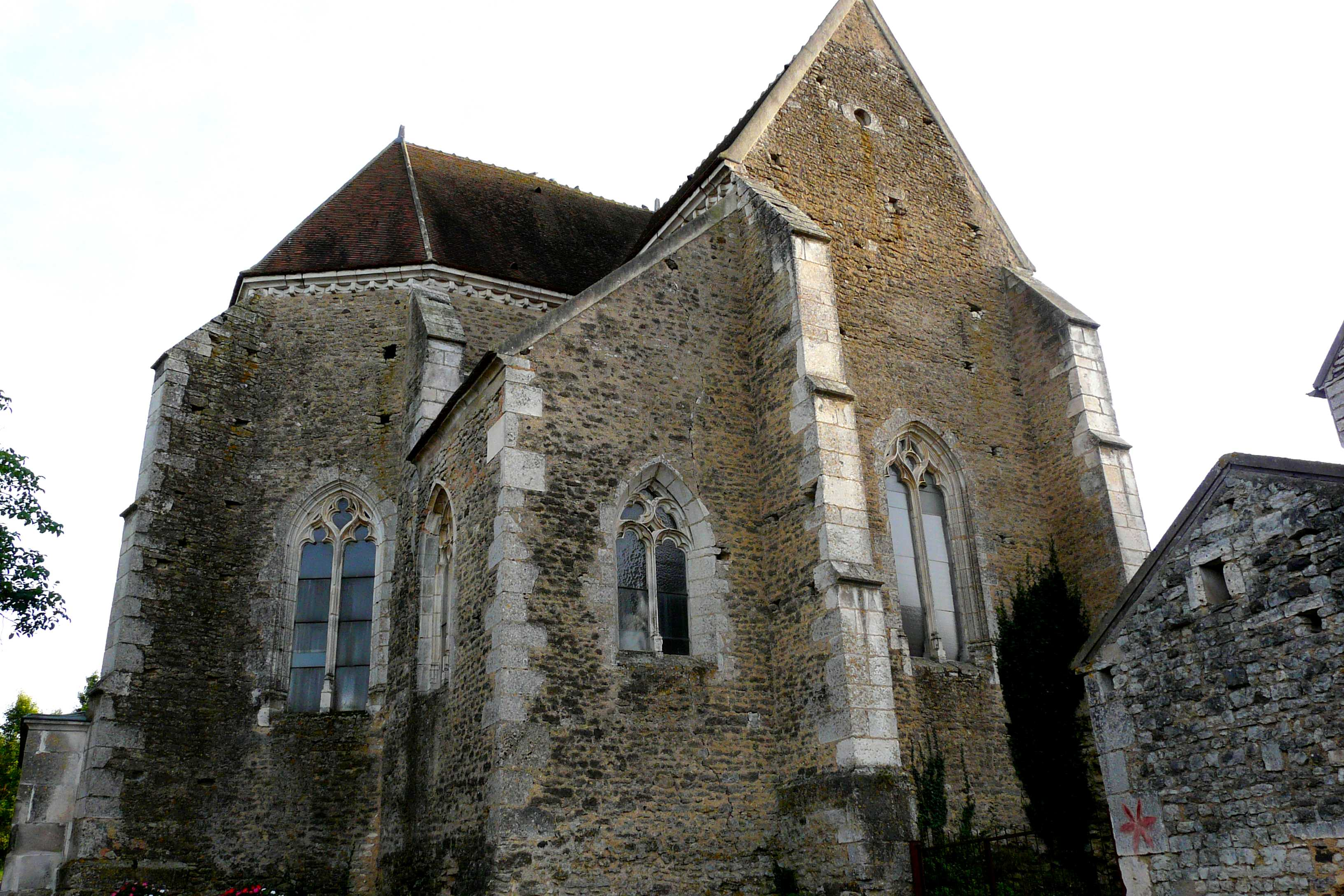
- The church in Collan
- Location of Collan
- Location within France Location within Bourgogne-Franche-Comté
- Coordinates: 47°50′36″N 3°52′35″E
- Country: France
- Region: Bourgogne-Franche-Comté
- Department: Yonne
- Arrondissement: Avallon
- Canton: Tonnerrois

Government
  - Mayor (2020–2026): Pierrette Gibier
- Area^{1}: 13.16 km^{2} (5.08 sq mi)
- Highest elevation: 301 m (988 ft)
- Lowest elevation: 175 m (574 ft)
- Population (2023): 155
  - Density: 11.8/km^{2} (30.5/sq mi)
- Time zone: UTC+01:00 (CET)
  - Summer (DST): UTC+02:00 (CEST)
- INSEE/Postal code: 89112 /89700
- ^{1} French Land Register data, which excludes lakes, ponds, glaciers > 1 km^{2} (0.386 sq mi or 247 acres) and river estuaries.

Collan (French pronunciation: [kɔlɑ̃]) is a commune in the Yonne department in Bourgogne-Franche-Comté in north-central France.

== See also ==
- Communes of the Yonne department
