= Lézinnes =

- Commune
- Coat of arms
- Location of Lézinnes
- Location within France Location within Bourgogne-Franche-Comté
- Coordinates: 47°48′06″N 4°05′19″E
- Country: France
- Region: Bourgogne-Franche-Comté
- Department: Yonne
- Arrondissement: Avallon
- Canton: Tonnerrois

Government
  - Mayor (2024–2026): José Menard
- Area^{1}: 15.96 km^{2} (6.16 sq mi)
- Highest elevation: 273 m (896 ft)
- Lowest elevation: 157 m (515 ft)
- Population (2023): 666
  - Density: 41.7/km^{2} (108/sq mi)
- Time zone: UTC+01:00 (CET)
  - Summer (DST): UTC+02:00 (CEST)
- INSEE/Postal code: 89223 /89160
- ^{1} French Land Register data, which excludes lakes, ponds, glaciers > 1 km^{2} (0.386 sq mi or 247 acres) and river estuaries.

Lézinnes (French pronunciation: [lezin]) is a commune in the Yonne department in Bourgogne-Franche-Comté in north-central France.

== See also ==
- Communes of the Yonne department
