= Lanty =

Lanty may refer to:

== People ==
- Alain Lanty (born 1961), French singer, composer and pianist
- Lanty Slee (1800–1878), English smuggler

== Places ==
- Lanty, Arkansas, United States
- Lanty, Nièvre, France
- Lanty-sur-Aube, France
