= Maux =

Maux may refer to:

== People ==
- Henri Maux (1901-1950), French engineer
- Inge Maux (born 1944), Austrian actress
- Mme de Maux (1725-?), French 18th century personality
- Richard Maux (1893–1971), Austrian composer

== Places ==
- Maux, Nièvre, France
