= Philippe Rondot =

French intelligence agent

- Born: 5 October 1936
- Died: 31 December 2017 (aged 81)
- Education: École Spéciale Militaire de Saint-Cyr
- Occupation: General

Philippe Rondot (English: /rɒnˈdoʊ/ ron-DOH, French: [filip ʁɔ̃do]; 5 October 1936 – 31 December 2017) was a French general, formerly an important personality of the French intelligence. He worked for both the domestic intelligence DST and the foreign intelligence DGSE (traditionally rival services) and was an aide to several Defence Ministers.

== Early life ==
Philippe Rondot was born in Nancy in 1936. He graduated from the École Spéciale Militaire de Saint-Cyr in 1965, and he earned a PhD in political sociology.

== Career ==
Rondot joined the "special services" in 1965 as an officer of the "action" branch of the SDECE (ancestor of the present DGSE). In the late 1970s, he joined the DST. In 1994, he was active in the capture of terrorist Ilich Ramírez Sánchez (aka "Carlos the Jackal") in Sudan. He also took part in hostage liberations in Libya and Iraq.

From 1997, he was in charge of coordinating intelligence at the Defence Ministry, until he retired on 31 December 2005. His title was "conseiller pour le renseignement et les opérations spéciales" ("advisor for intelligence and special operations") of the Defence minister, first Alain Richard and later Michèle Alliot-Marie.

Rondot became a Grand Officer of the Legion of Honour in 2006.

=== Second Clearstream Affair ===
The second Clearstream affair is an episode of the enquiry regarding the selling of La Fayette-class frigates to Taiwan by Thomson, then directed by Alain Gomez.

After receiving a Clearstream listing from Jean-Louis Gergorin, Philippe Rondot directed an inquiry, following orders from the minister of Defence, and reporting to Prime Minister Dominique de Villepin directly. This caused Rondot's house to be searched in March 2006, and himself to be audited, by judges Jean-Marie d'Huy and Henri Pons.

== Death ==
Rondot resided in a manor in Fléty, where he died on December 31, 2017, aged 81.

== Works ==
- La Syrie, Presses universitaires de France, Paris, 1978 ISBN 2-13-045509-3.
- L'Irak, Presses universitaires de France, Paris, 1979 ISBN 2-13-046840-3.
- La Jordanie, Presses universitaires de France, Paris, 1980 ISBN 2-13-036345-8.
- Les projets de paix arabo-israéliens, École des hautes études en sciences sociales, Paris, 1980 (thèse universitaire).
- Le Proche-Orient à la recherche de la paix, 1973-1982, Presses universitaires de France, Paris, 1982 ISBN 2-13-037518-9.
- With Bichara Khader, Le Parti Ba'th, École des hautes études en sciences sociales, Louvain-la-Neuve, Centre de Recherches sur le monde arabe contemporain, 1984.
