= Moulins-Engilbert =

- Commune
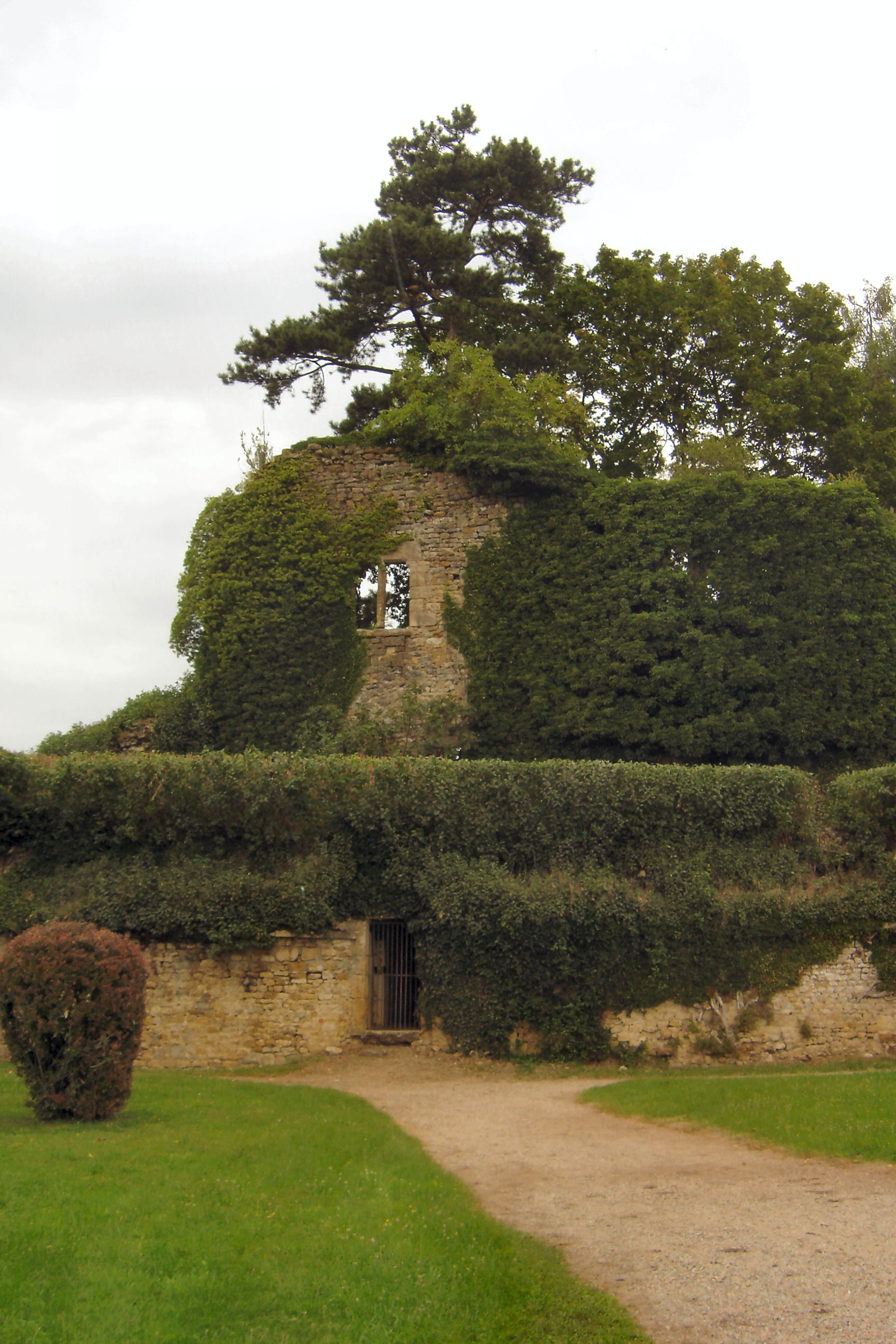
- The ruins of the chateau

- Coat of arms
- Location of Moulins-Engilbert
- Location within France Location within Bourgogne-Franche-Comté
- Coordinates: 46°59′16″N 3°48′41″E
- Country: France
- Region: Bourgogne-Franche-Comté
- Department: Nièvre
- Arrondissement: Château-Chinon
- Canton: Luzy

Government
  - Mayor (2020–2026): Serge Ducreuzot
- Area^{1}: 40.76 km^{2} (15.74 sq mi)
- Highest elevation: 441 m (1,447 ft)
- Lowest elevation: 209 m (686 ft)
- Population (2023): 1,352
  - Density: 33.17/km^{2} (85.91/sq mi)
- Time zone: UTC+01:00 (CET)
  - Summer (DST): UTC+02:00 (CEST)
- INSEE/Postal code: 58182 /58290
- ^{1} French Land Register data, which excludes lakes, ponds, glaciers > 1 km^{2} (0.386 sq mi or 247 acres) and river estuaries.

Moulins-Engilbert (French pronunciation: [mulɛ̃ ɑ̃ʒilbɛʁ]) is a commune in the Nièvre department in central France. It is 10 km north of Saint-Honoré-les-Bains.

The village is home to the museum for the history and breeding of Charolais cattle.

It was the birthplace of Honoré Jacquinot (1815–1887), surgeon and zoologist.

== See also ==
- Communes of the Nièvre department
- Parc naturel régional du Morvan
