= Château de Chandioux =

Ruined castle in Bourgogne-Franche-Comté, France

Coordinates: 47.0469°N 3.8044°E

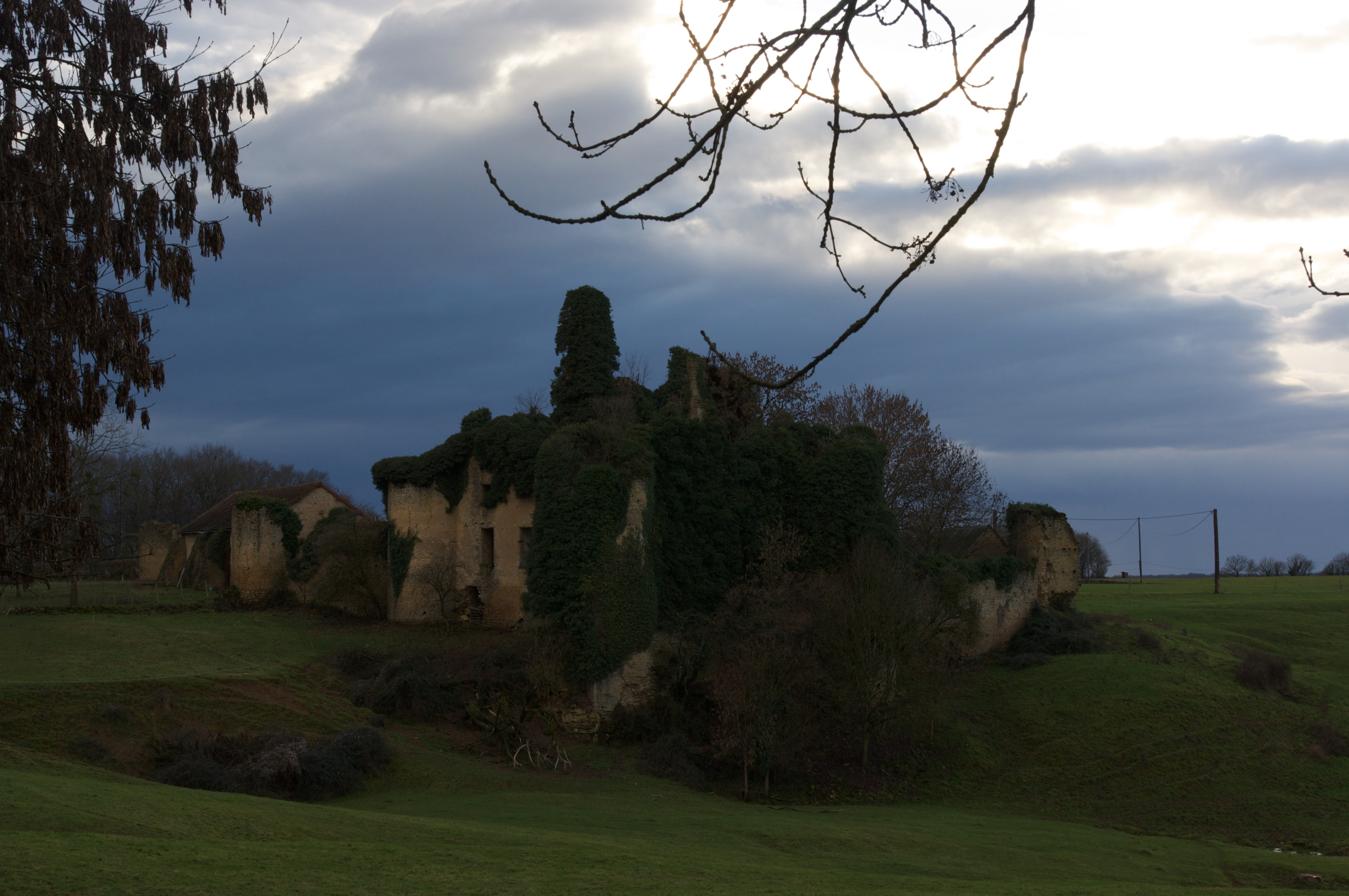
Château de Chandioux

The Château de Chandioux is a ruined castle in the commune of Maux in the Nièvre département of France.

The castle was built in the 14th century and remodelled in the 15th and 16th centuries. According to Victor Moreau, a window now hidden by vegetation bears the date 1585. Remains of the castle include the lower court, the keep and the gatehouse. It has been listed since 1970 as a monument historique by the French Ministry of Culture.

According to M. Colas, in around 1786, Jacques de la Ferté-Meun partially demolished the castle to build the Château de Solières or Saulières in the canton of Château-Chinon in the village of Saint-Péreuse.

== See also ==
- List of castles in France
