= Poil =

- Commune
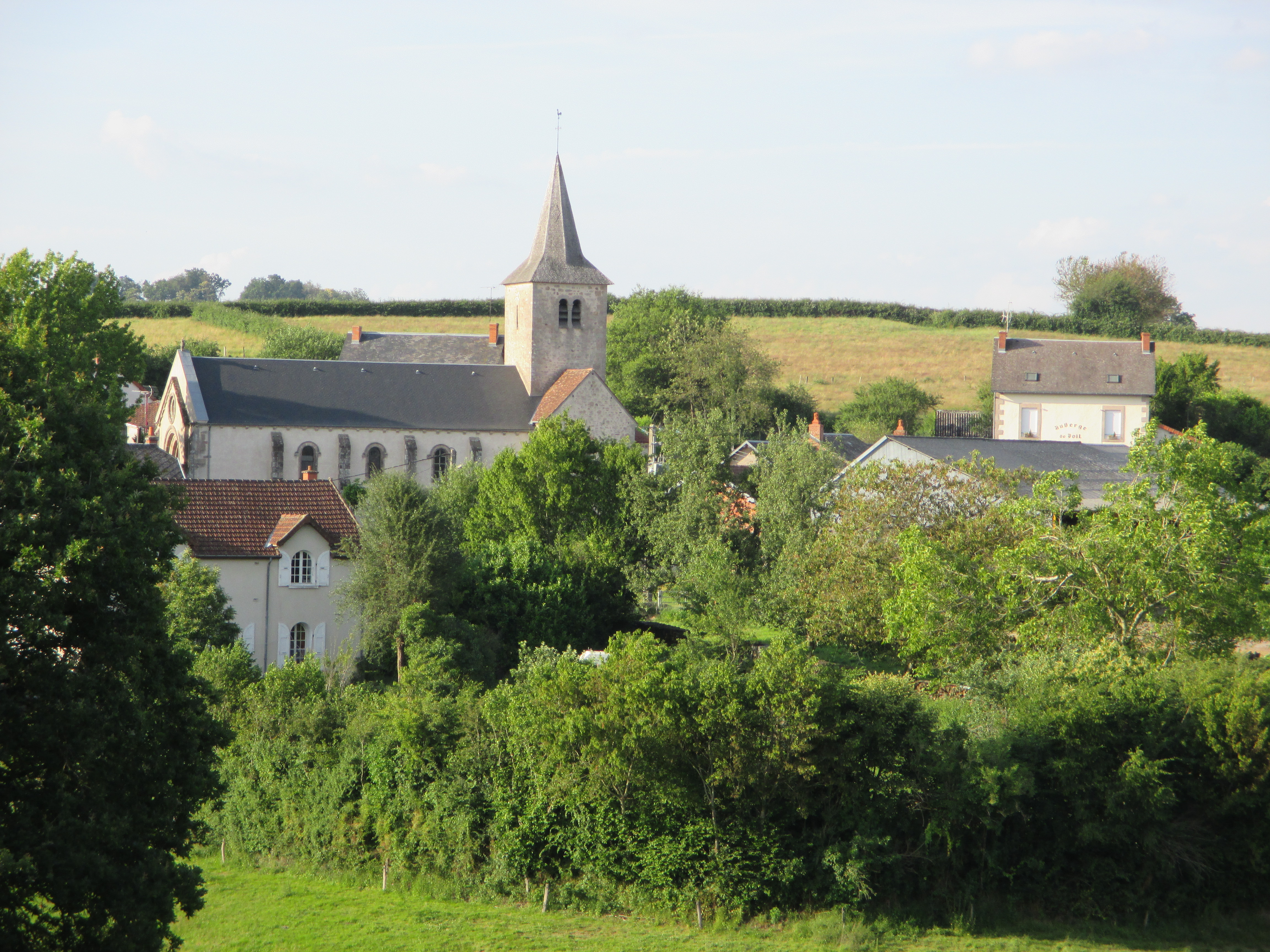
- General view with the church Saint-Romain.
- Location of Poil
- Location within France Location within Bourgogne-Franche-Comté
- Coordinates: 46°52′04″N 4°04′28″E
- Country: France
- Region: Bourgogne-Franche-Comté
- Department: Nièvre
- Arrondissement: Château-Chinon
- Canton: Luzy
- Intercommunality: Bazois Loire Morvan

Government
  - Mayor (2020–2026): Christian Courault
- Area^{1}: 27.02 km^{2} (10.43 sq mi)
- Highest elevation: 522 m (1,713 ft)
- Lowest elevation: 297 m (974 ft)
- Population (2023): 152
  - Density: 5.63/km^{2} (14.6/sq mi)
- Time zone: UTC+01:00 (CET)
  - Summer (DST): UTC+02:00 (CEST)
- INSEE/Postal code: 58211 /58170
- ^{1} French Land Register data, which excludes lakes, ponds, glaciers > 1 km^{2} (0.386 sq mi or 247 acres) and river estuaries.

Poil (French pronunciation: [pwal]) is a commune in the Nièvre department in central France.

== History ==
The name of the locality was first recorded as Picti in the 10th century, then Poiz in 1281, Poys in the 14th century, Poy in 1414, and finally Poil in 1592. This development reflects a regular change from the root Picti- to Poi(z)-, similar to other Celtic place names. The root "Pict-" probably relates to the Picts, a people from Scotland, possibly in theme with foreign Roman legions stationed there (compare e.g. Mortagne and Sermaise, from Mauretania and Sarmatia respectively). The final "-l" was added later, influenced by the common noun "poil", a homophone (common in French) with Pois.

== Geography ==
The commune is part of the parc naturel régional du Morvan. The river Alène has its source in the south-western part of the commune. Poil is located at an altitude of 350m, with its minimum point being 297 metres and the maximum at 522. Its area spans 2,702 hectares.

== See also ==
- Communes of the Nièvre department
