= Chiddes =

Chiddes may refer to:

- Chiddes, Nièvre, a commune in the French region of Bourgogne
- Chiddes, Saône-et-Loire a commune in the French region of Bourgogne
