= Rignault =

Rignault is a French surname. Notable people with the surname include:

- Alexandre Rignault (1901–1985), French actor
- Simone Rignault (1943–2019), French politician
