= Montambert =

- Commune
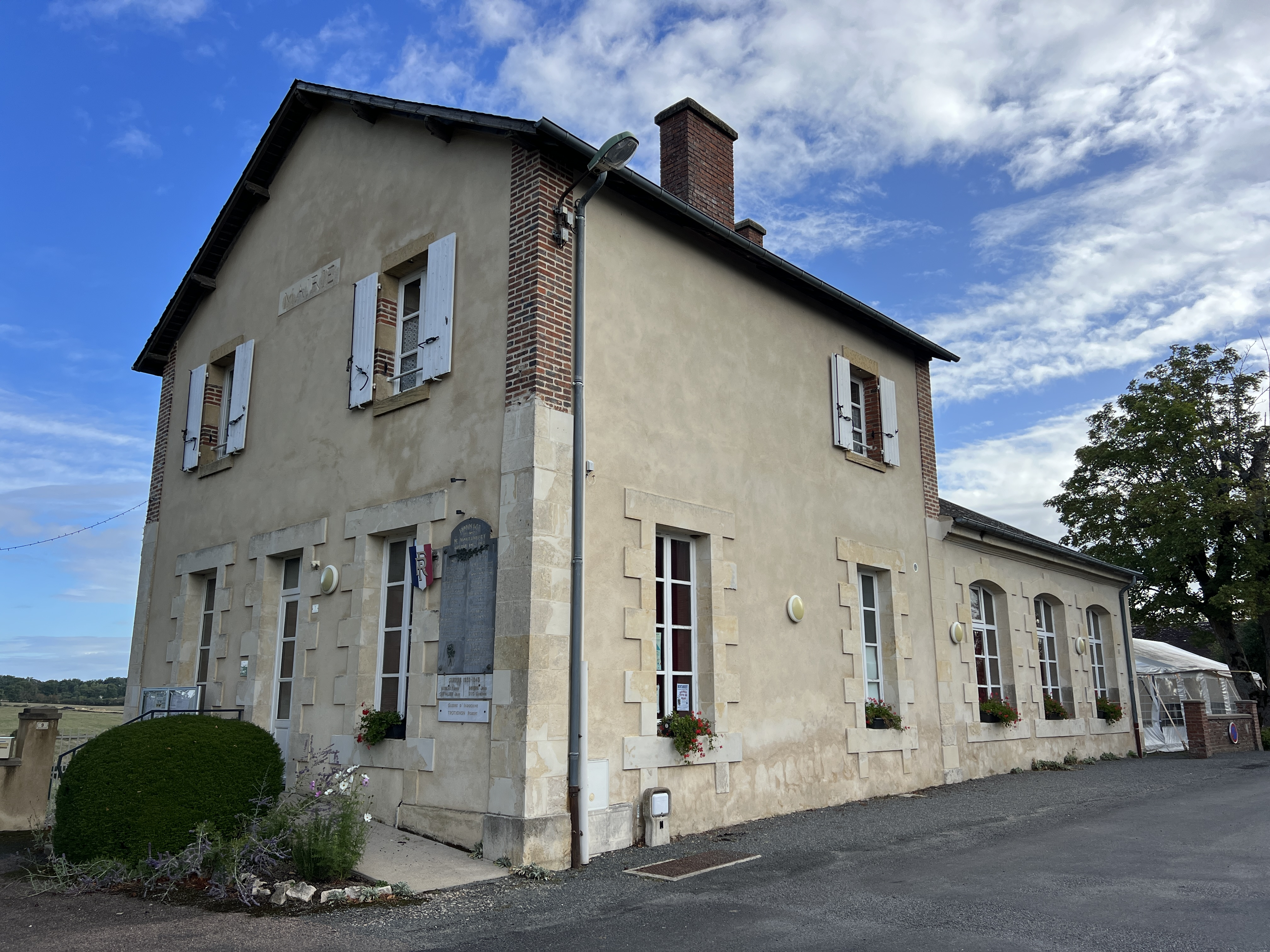
- Montambert Town hall
- Location of Montambert
- Location within France Location within Bourgogne-Franche-Comté
- Coordinates: 46°46′16″N 3°40′40″E
- Country: France
- Region: Bourgogne-Franche-Comté
- Department: Nièvre
- Arrondissement: Château-Chinon (Ville)
- Canton: Luzy

Government
  - Mayor (2020–2026): Marie-Christine Roy
- Area^{1}: 25.97 km^{2} (10.03 sq mi)
- Highest elevation: 252 m (827 ft)
- Lowest elevation: 198 m (650 ft)
- Population (2023): 114
  - Density: 4.39/km^{2} (11.4/sq mi)
- Time zone: UTC+01:00 (CET)
  - Summer (DST): UTC+02:00 (CEST)
- INSEE/Postal code: 58172 /58250
- ^{1} French Land Register data, which excludes lakes, ponds, glaciers > 1 km^{2} (0.386 sq mi or 247 acres) and river estuaries.

Montambert (French pronunciation: [mɔ̃tɑ̃bɛʁ]) is a commune in the Nièvre department in central France.

== See also ==
- Communes of the Nièvre department
