= Rémilly, Nièvre =

Rémilly
- Commune
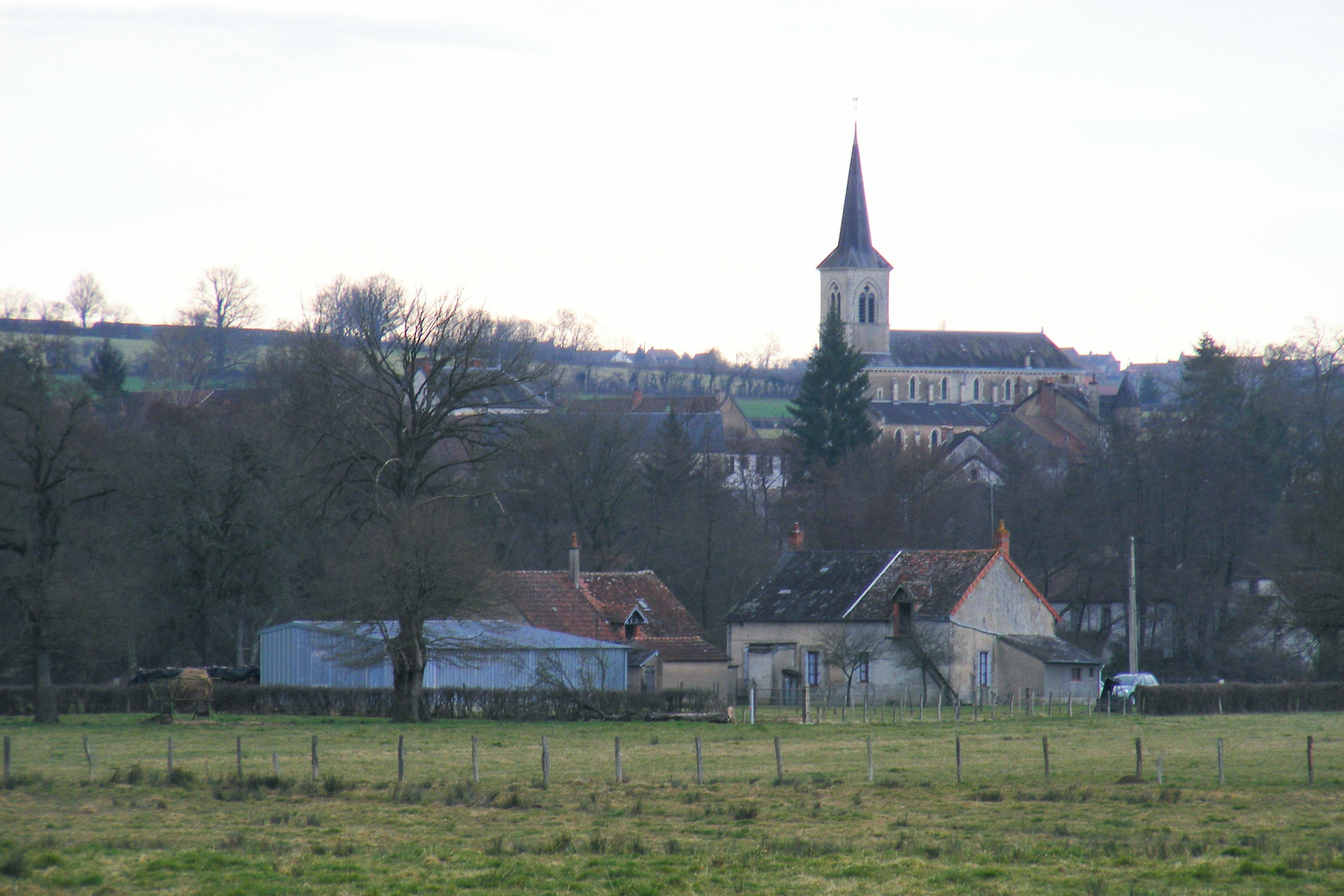
- A general view of Remilly
- Location of Rémilly
- Location within France Location within Bourgogne-Franche-Comté
- Coordinates: 46°49′12″N 3°48′56″E
- Country: France
- Region: Bourgogne-Franche-Comté
- Department: Nièvre
- Arrondissement: Château-Chinon
- Canton: Luzy

Government
  - Mayor (2020–2026): Jean-Paul Margerin
- Area^{1}: 36.43 km^{2} (14.07 sq mi)
- Highest elevation: 347 m (1,138 ft)
- Lowest elevation: 210 m (690 ft)
- Population (2023): 157
  - Density: 4.31/km^{2} (11.2/sq mi)
- Time zone: UTC+01:00 (CET)
  - Summer (DST): UTC+02:00 (CEST)
- INSEE/Postal code: 58221 /58250
- ^{1} French Land Register data, which excludes lakes, ponds, glaciers > 1 km^{2} (0.386 sq mi or 247 acres) and river estuaries.

Rémilly (French pronunciation: [ʁemiji]) is a commune in the Nièvre department in central France.

== Geography ==
The village lies on the left bank of the river Alène.

== See also ==
- Communes of the Nièvre department
