= Ternant, Nièvre =

Ternant
- Commune
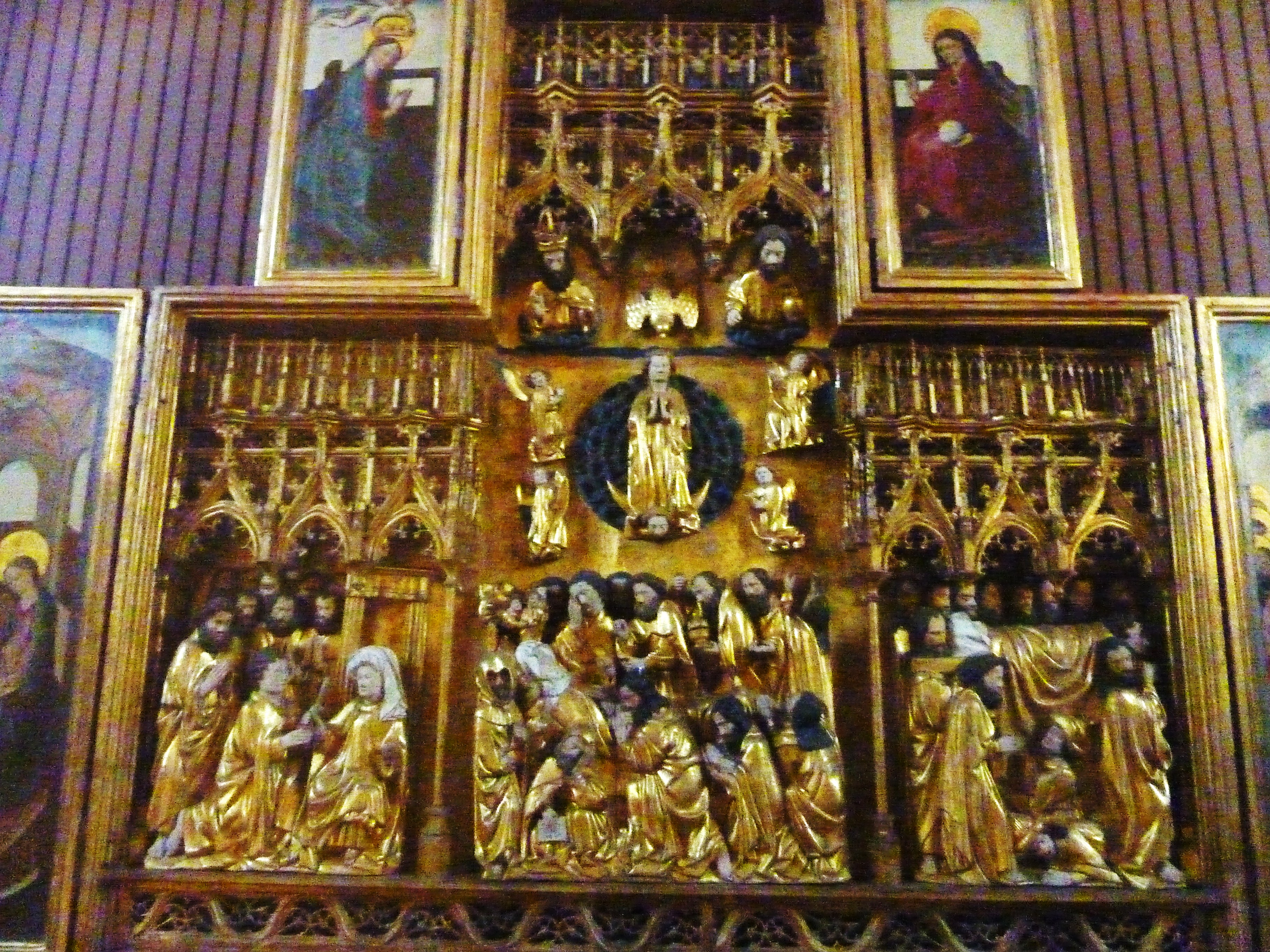
- The retable of the Virgin, in the church of Saint-Roch

- Coat of arms
- Location of Ternant
- Location within France Location within Bourgogne-Franche-Comté
- Coordinates: 46°45′04″N 3°50′23″E
- Country: France
- Region: Bourgogne-Franche-Comté
- Department: Nièvre
- Arrondissement: Château-Chinon (Ville)
- Canton: Luzy
- Intercommunality: Bazois Loire Morvan

Government
  - Mayor (2020–2026): Séverine Taillon
- Area^{1}: 19.38 km^{2} (7.48 sq mi)
- Highest elevation: 415 m (1,362 ft)
- Lowest elevation: 231 m (758 ft)
- Population (2023): 166
  - Density: 8.57/km^{2} (22.2/sq mi)
- Time zone: UTC+01:00 (CET)
  - Summer (DST): UTC+02:00 (CEST)
- INSEE/Postal code: 58289 /58250
- ^{1} French Land Register data, which excludes lakes, ponds, glaciers > 1 km^{2} (0.386 sq mi or 247 acres) and river estuaries.

Ternant (French pronunciation: [tɛʁnɑ̃]) is a commune in the Nièvre department in central France.

== See also ==
- Communes of the Nièvre department
