= Isenay =

- Commune
- Location of Isenay
- Location within France Location within Bourgogne-Franche-Comté
- Coordinates: 46°54′09″N 3°42′19″E
- Country: France
- Region: Bourgogne-Franche-Comté
- Department: Nièvre
- Arrondissement: Château-Chinon
- Canton: Luzy

Government
  - Mayor (2020–2026): Pascal Petit
- Area^{1}: 20.17 km^{2} (7.79 sq mi)
- Highest elevation: 275 m (902 ft)
- Lowest elevation: 196 m (643 ft)
- Population (2023): 94
  - Density: 4.7/km^{2} (12/sq mi)
- Time zone: UTC+01:00 (CET)
  - Summer (DST): UTC+02:00 (CEST)
- INSEE/Postal code: 58135 /58290
- ^{1} French Land Register data, which excludes lakes, ponds, glaciers > 1 km^{2} (0.386 sq mi or 247 acres) and river estuaries.

Isenay (French pronunciation: [iznɛ]) is a commune in the Nièvre department in central France.

== See also ==
- Communes of the Nièvre department
