= Luzy, Nièvre =

Luzy
- Commune
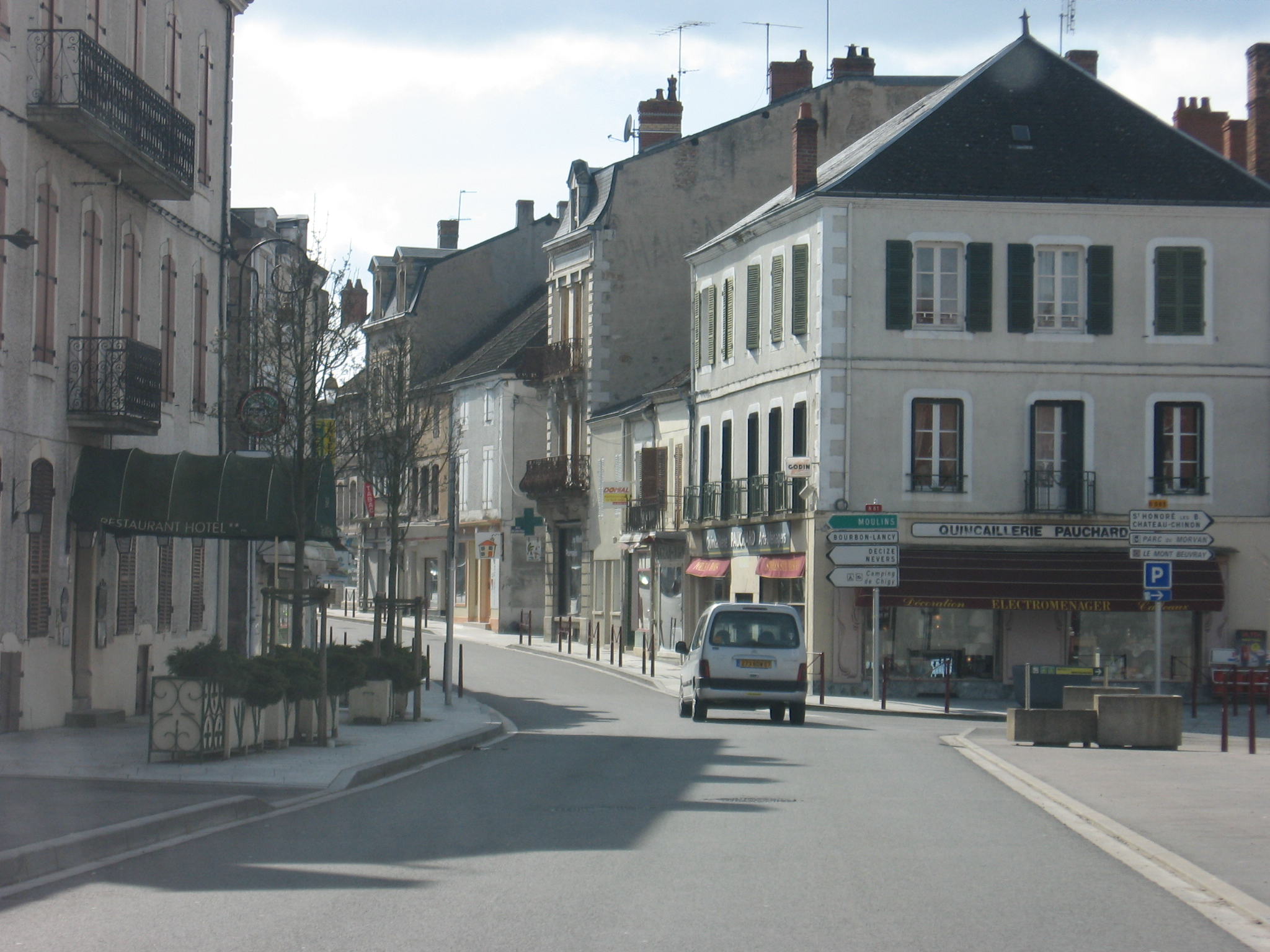
- A view within Luzy

- Coat of arms
- Location of Luzy
- Location within France Location within Bourgogne-Franche-Comté
- Coordinates: 46°47′24″N 3°58′15″E
- Country: France
- Region: Bourgogne-Franche-Comté
- Department: Nièvre
- Arrondissement: Château-Chinon
- Canton: Luzy

Government
  - Mayor (2020–2026): Jocelyne Guerin
- Area^{1}: 41.67 km^{2} (16.09 sq mi)
- Highest elevation: 512 m (1,680 ft)
- Lowest elevation: 252 m (827 ft)
- Population (2023): 2,006
  - Density: 48.14/km^{2} (124.7/sq mi)
- Time zone: UTC+01:00 (CET)
  - Summer (DST): UTC+02:00 (CEST)
- INSEE/Postal code: 58149 /58170
- ^{1} French Land Register data, which excludes lakes, ponds, glaciers > 1 km^{2} (0.386 sq mi or 247 acres) and river estuaries.

Luzy (French pronunciation: [lyzi]) is a commune in the Nièvre department in central France.

== Geography ==
The village is located in the middle of the commune, on the right bank of the river Alène.

== Demographics ==
Historical population
Year	Pop.	±% p.a.
1968	2,598	—
1975	2,639	+0.22%
1982	2,746	+0.57%
1990	2,422	−1.56%
1999	2,234	−0.89%
2007	2,043	−1.11%
2012	1,984	−0.58%
2017	1,980	−0.04%
2023	2,006	+0.22%
Source: INSEE

== See also ==
- Communes of the Nièvre department
- Parc naturel régional du Morvan
