= Simone Rignault =

French politician (1943–2019)

Member of the French Parliament for Nièvre's 3rd constituency
- In office 1993–1997

Mayor of Saint-Honoré-les-Bains
- In office 1989–2014

Personal details
- Born: Simone Beneteau; 5 May 1943; Vichy, France
- Died: 15 January 2019 (aged 75); Nevers, France
- Political party: Rally for the Republic; Union for a Popular Movement
- Occupation: School psychologist

Simone Rignault (born 5 May 1943 in Vichy; died 15 January 2019 in Nevers) was a French politician.

== Early life ==
After a first year in literature, she obtained a degree in psychology and became a school psychologist. Elected mayor of Saint-Honoré-les-Bains in 1989, she also ran in 1993 in the elections of the 10th legislature of the Fifth Republic, where she was elected to the National Assembly. She left her profession as a psychologist to devote herself full-time to politics. Jacques Chirac appointed her to the Economic and Social Council from 1997 to 1999, where she is a member of the section and president of the Cultural Commission. Passionate about history and collector of old books, paintings and earthenware, with a predilection for ceramics from the Pottery of the Mountain, she has offered many pieces to the local museum, installed in the town hall, during her administration. She and her administration supported local heritage, implementing the actions necessary for its promotion. She was the mother of four boys. Her husband died in 1985. She died on 15 January 2019.
