= Alène =

River in central France

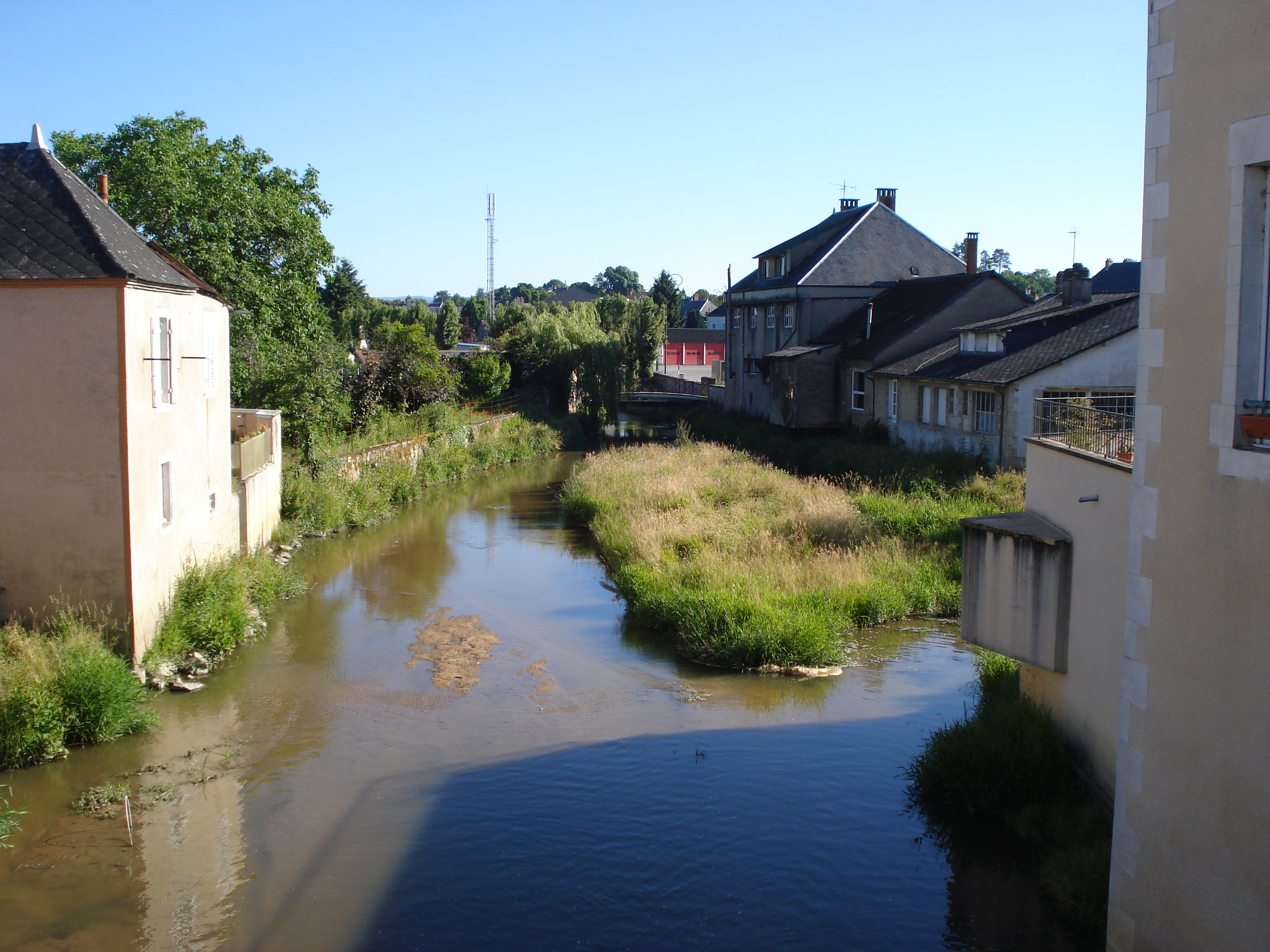
- The Alène at Luzy.

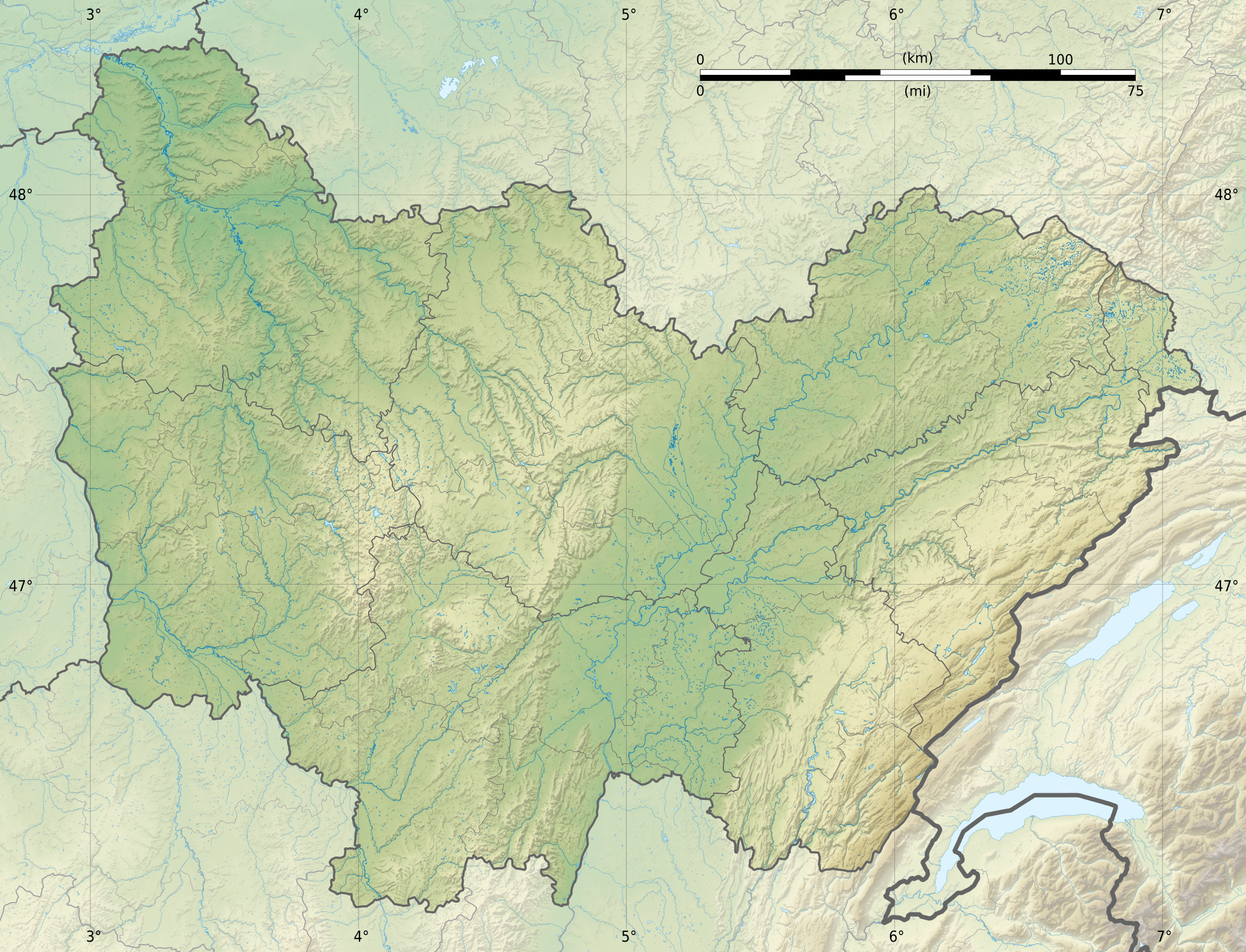
- Location within France Location within Bourgogne-Franche-Comté

Location
- Country: France

Physical characteristics
- Source
  - location: Poil
  - coordinates: 46°51′47″N 04°01′57″E
  - elevation: 410 m (1,350 ft)
- Mouth
  - location: Aron
  - coordinates: 46°51′59″N 03°39′19″E
  - elevation: 195 m (640 ft)
- Length: 55.9 km (34.7 mi)
- Basin size: 338 km^{2} (131 sq mi)
- Discharge
  - average: 4.48 m^{3}/s (158 cu ft/s)

Basin features
- Progression: Aron→ Loire→ Atlantic Ocean

The Alène (French pronunciation: [alɛn]) is a 55.9-kilometre (34.7 mi) long river in the Nièvre department in central France. Its source is at Poil, about 3 kilometres (2 mi) west of the village, in the parc naturel régional du Morvan. It flows generally west. It is a left tributary of the Aron, into which it flows at Cercy-la-Tour, about 15 kilometres (9 mi) east-northeast of Decize.

== Communes along its course ==
This list is ordered from source to mouth:

- Nièvre: Poil, Millay, Luzy, Fléty, Avrée, Sémelay, Rémilly, Fours, Thaix, Cercy-la-Tour
