= Fours, Nièvre =

Fours
- Commune
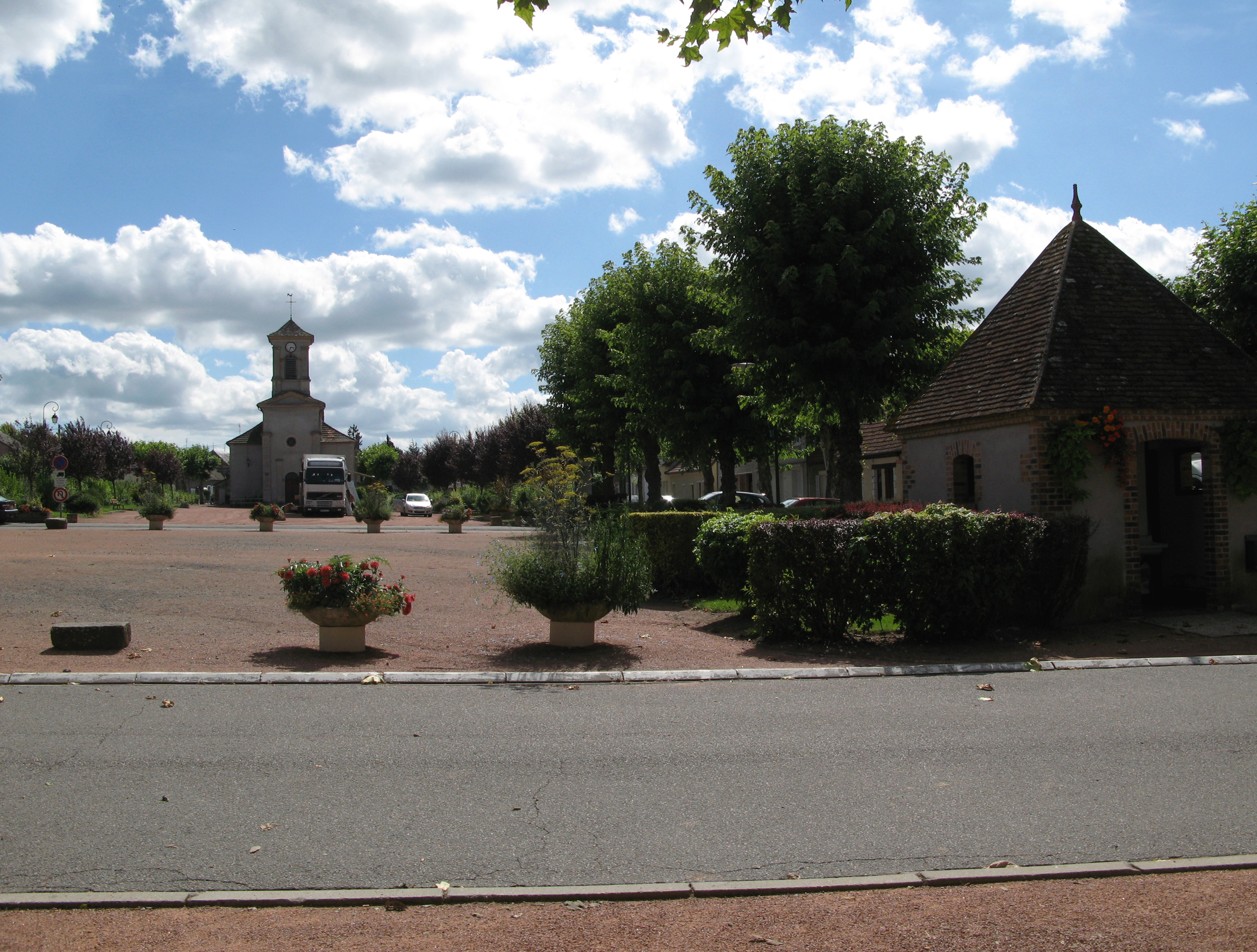
- The centre of Fours
- Location of Fours
- Location within France Location within Bourgogne-Franche-Comté
- Coordinates: 46°49′05″N 3°43′13″E
- Country: France
- Region: Bourgogne-Franche-Comté
- Department: Nièvre
- Arrondissement: Château-Chinon (Ville)
- Canton: Luzy

Government
  - Mayor (2020–2026): David Bongard
- Area^{1}: 25.53 km^{2} (9.86 sq mi)
- Highest elevation: 263 m (863 ft)
- Lowest elevation: 201 m (659 ft)
- Population (2023): 582
  - Density: 22.8/km^{2} (59.0/sq mi)
- Time zone: UTC+01:00 (CET)
  - Summer (DST): UTC+02:00 (CEST)
- INSEE/Postal code: 58118 /58250
- ^{1} French Land Register data, which excludes lakes, ponds, glaciers > 1 km^{2} (0.386 sq mi or 247 acres) and river estuaries.

Fours is a commune in the Nièvre department in central France.

== Geography ==
The river Alène forms all of the commune's northern border.

== See also ==
- Communes of the Nièvre department
