= Montigny-sur-Canne =

- Commune
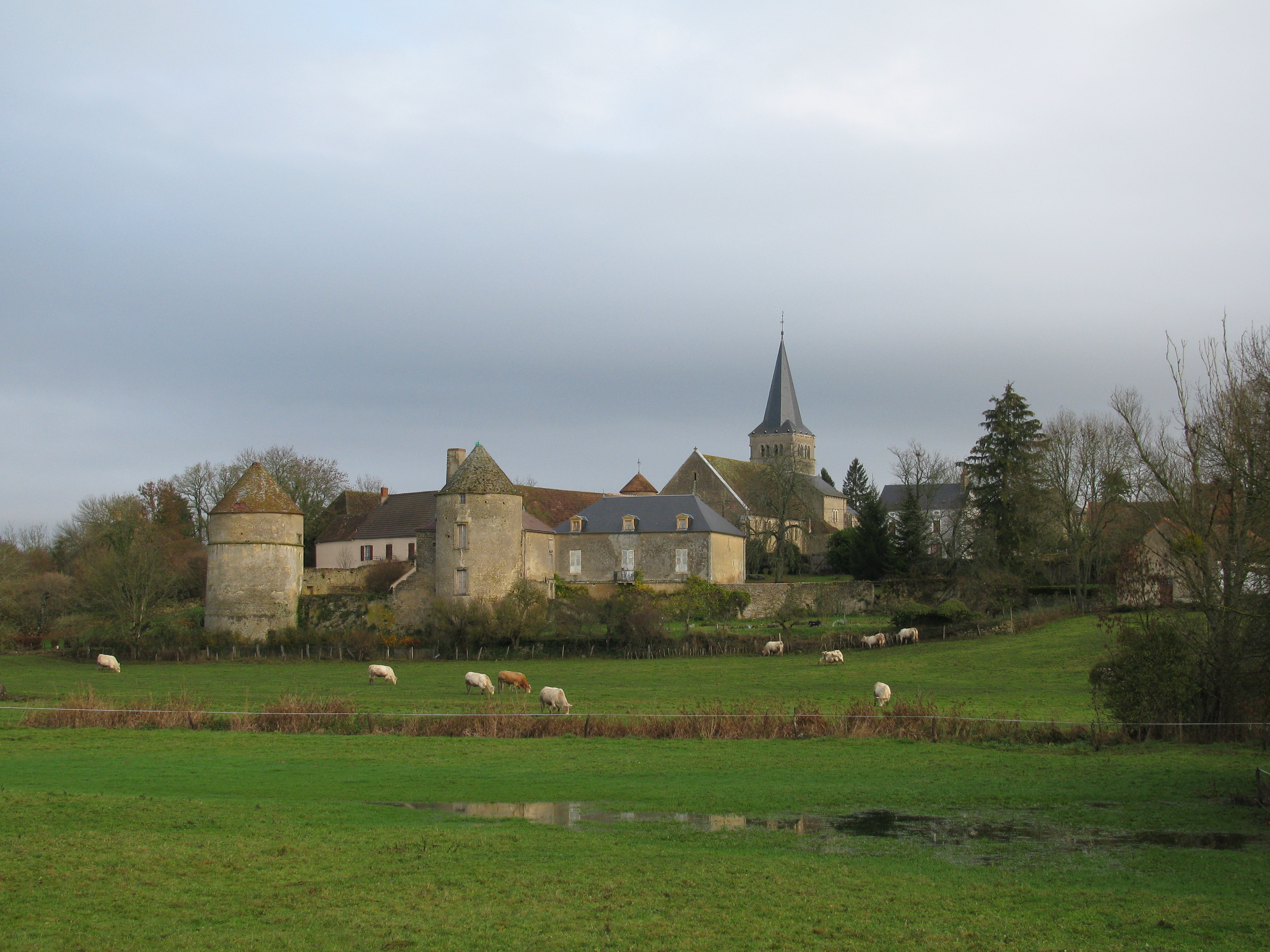
- A general view of Montigny-sur-Canne
- Location of Montigny-sur-Canne
- Location within France Location within Bourgogne-Franche-Comté
- Coordinates: 46°56′00″N 3°39′22″E
- Country: France
- Region: Bourgogne-Franche-Comté
- Department: Nièvre
- Arrondissement: Château-Chinon (Ville)
- Canton: Luzy

Government
  - Mayor (2020–2026): Antoine-Audoin Maggiar
- Area^{1}: 30.36 km^{2} (11.72 sq mi)
- Highest elevation: 277 m (909 ft)
- Lowest elevation: 202 m (663 ft)
- Population (2023): 153
  - Density: 5.04/km^{2} (13.1/sq mi)
- Time zone: UTC+01:00 (CET)
  - Summer (DST): UTC+02:00 (CEST)
- INSEE/Postal code: 58178 /58340
- ^{1} French Land Register data, which excludes lakes, ponds, glaciers > 1 km^{2} (0.386 sq mi or 247 acres) and river estuaries.

Montigny-sur-Canne (French pronunciation: [mɔ̃tiɲi syʁ kan]) is a commune in the Nièvre department in central France.

== See also ==
- Communes of the Nièvre department
