= Savigny-Poil-Fol =

- Commune
- Coat of arms
- Location of Savigny-Poil-Fol
- Location within France Location within Bourgogne-Franche-Comté
- Coordinates: 46°46′58″N 3°51′32″E
- Country: France
- Region: Bourgogne-Franche-Comté
- Department: Nièvre
- Arrondissement: Château-Chinon
- Canton: Luzy

Government
  - Mayor (2020–2026): Bernard Leblanc
- Area^{1}: 17.30 km^{2} (6.68 sq mi)
- Highest elevation: 352 m (1,155 ft)
- Lowest elevation: 225 m (738 ft)
- Population (2023): 108
  - Density: 6.24/km^{2} (16.2/sq mi)
- Time zone: UTC+01:00 (CET)
  - Summer (DST): UTC+02:00 (CEST)
- INSEE/Postal code: 58274 /58170
- ^{1} French Land Register data, which excludes lakes, ponds, glaciers > 1 km^{2} (0.386 sq mi or 247 acres) and river estuaries.

Savigny-Poil-Fol (French pronunciation: [saviɲi pwal fɔl]) is a commune in the Nièvre department in central France.

== See also ==
- Communes of the Nièvre department
