= Larochemillay =

- Commune
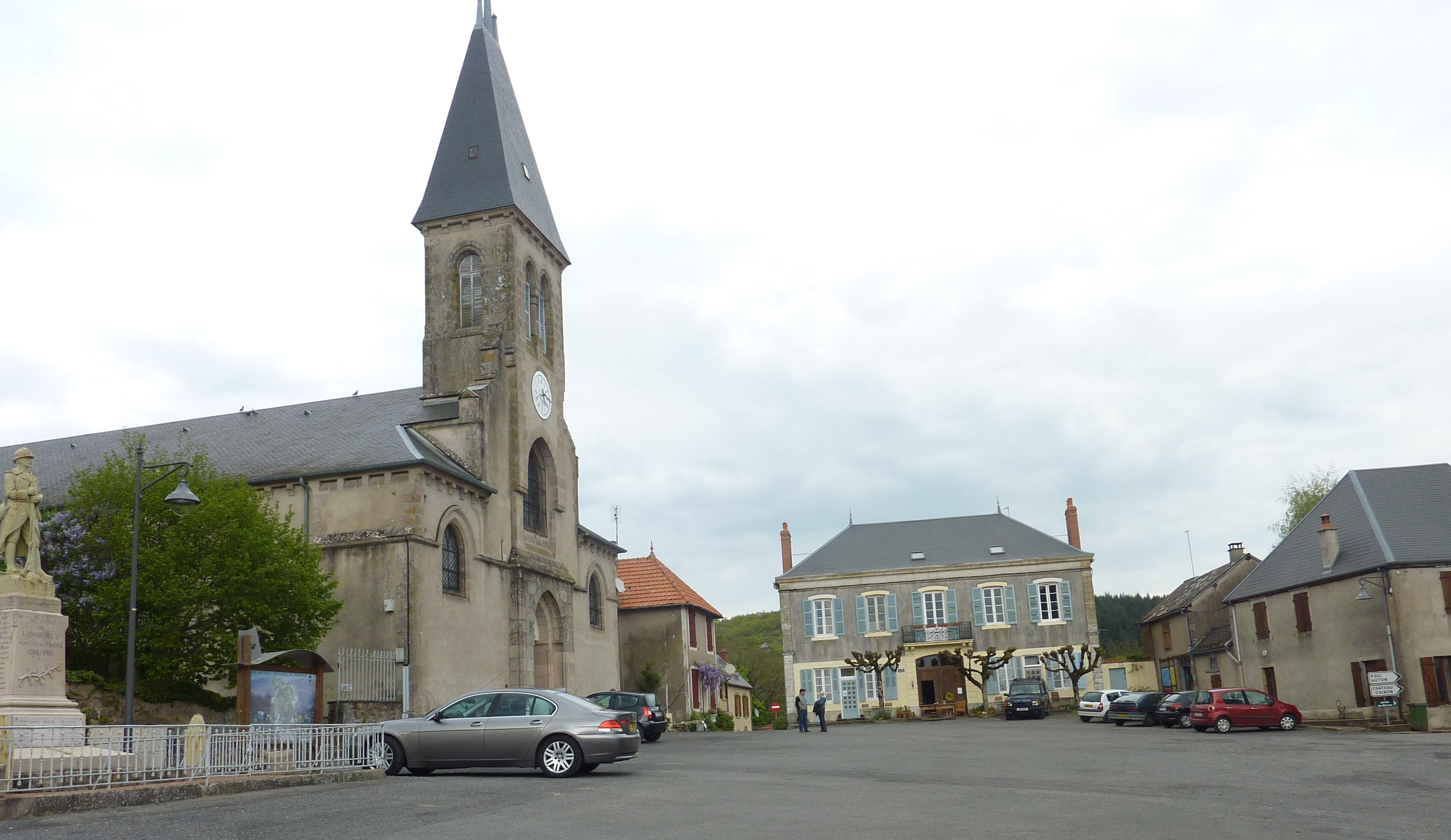

- Coat of arms
- Location of Larochemillay
- Location within France Location within Bourgogne-Franche-Comté
- Coordinates: 46°52′41″N 4°00′10″E
- Country: France
- Region: Bourgogne-Franche-Comté
- Department: Nièvre
- Arrondissement: Château-Chinon
- Canton: Luzy

Government
  - Mayor (2020–2026): Nathalie Michon
- Area^{1}: 41.15 km^{2} (15.89 sq mi)
- Highest elevation: 780 m (2,560 ft)
- Lowest elevation: 282 m (925 ft)
- Population (2023): 226
  - Density: 5.49/km^{2} (14.2/sq mi)
- Time zone: UTC+01:00 (CET)
  - Summer (DST): UTC+02:00 (CEST)
- INSEE/Postal code: 58140 /58370
- ^{1} French Land Register data, which excludes lakes, ponds, glaciers > 1 km^{2} (0.386 sq mi or 247 acres) and river estuaries.

Larochemillay is a commune in the Nièvre department in central France.

== See also ==
- Communes of the Nièvre department
- Parc naturel régional du Morvan
