= Montaron =

- Commune
- Location of Montaron
- Location within France Location within Bourgogne-Franche-Comté
- Coordinates: 46°53′09″N 3°45′01″E
- Country: France
- Region: Bourgogne-Franche-Comté
- Department: Nièvre
- Arrondissement: Château-Chinon
- Canton: Luzy

Government
  - Mayor (2020–2026): Patrick Bertin
- Area^{1}: 33.40 km^{2} (12.90 sq mi)
- Elevation: 206 m (676 ft)
- Highest elevation: 268 m (879 ft)
- Lowest elevation: 200 m (660 ft)
- Population (2023): 159
  - Density: 4.76/km^{2} (12.3/sq mi)
- Time zone: UTC+01:00 (CET)
  - Summer (DST): UTC+02:00 (CEST)
- INSEE/Postal code: 58173 /58250
- ^{1} French Land Register data, which excludes lakes, ponds, glaciers > 1 km^{2} (0.386 sq mi or 247 acres) and river estuaries.

Montaron (French pronunciation: [mɔ̃taʁɔ̃]) is a commune in the Nièvre department in central France.

== See also ==
- Communes of the Nièvre department
