= Vandenesse =

- Commune
- Location of Vandenesse
- Location within France Location within Bourgogne-Franche-Comté
- Coordinates: 46°54′52″N 3°45′42″E
- Country: France
- Region: Bourgogne-Franche-Comté
- Department: Nièvre
- Arrondissement: Château-Chinon
- Canton: Luzy

Government
  - Mayor (2023–2026): Audrey Billoue
- Area^{1}: 32.49 km^{2} (12.54 sq mi)
- Highest elevation: 267 m (876 ft)
- Lowest elevation: 202 m (663 ft)
- Population (2023): 287
  - Density: 8.83/km^{2} (22.9/sq mi)
- Time zone: UTC+01:00 (CET)
  - Summer (DST): UTC+02:00 (CEST)
- INSEE/Postal code: 58301 /58290
- ^{1} French Land Register data, which excludes lakes, ponds, glaciers > 1 km^{2} (0.386 sq mi or 247 acres) and river estuaries.

Vandenesse (French pronunciation: [vɑ̃dnɛs]) is a commune in the Nièvre department in central France.

== See also ==
- Communes of the Nièvre department
