= Sermages =

- Commune
- Location of Sermages
- Location within France Location within Bourgogne-Franche-Comté
- Coordinates: 47°01′29″N 3°50′40″E
- Country: France
- Region: Bourgogne-Franche-Comté
- Department: Nièvre
- Arrondissement: Château-Chinon
- Canton: Luzy

Government
  - Mayor (2020–2026): Dominique Strieska
- Area^{1}: 22.07 km^{2} (8.52 sq mi)
- Highest elevation: 451 m (1,480 ft)
- Lowest elevation: 233 m (764 ft)
- Population (2023): 189
  - Density: 8.56/km^{2} (22.2/sq mi)
- Time zone: UTC+01:00 (CET)
  - Summer (DST): UTC+02:00 (CEST)
- INSEE/Postal code: 58277 /58290
- ^{1} French Land Register data, which excludes lakes, ponds, glaciers > 1 km^{2} (0.386 sq mi or 247 acres) and river estuaries.

Sermages (French pronunciation: [sɛʁmaʒ]) is a commune in the Nièvre department in central France.

== See also ==
- Communes of the Nièvre department
- Parc naturel régional du Morvan
