= Villapourçon =

- Commune
- Location of Villapourçon
- Location within France Location within Bourgogne-Franche-Comté
- Coordinates: 46°57′00″N 3°57′38″E
- Country: France
- Region: Bourgogne-Franche-Comté
- Department: Nièvre
- Arrondissement: Château-Chinon
- Canton: Luzy

Government
  - Mayor (2022–2026): Patrick Lorgé
- Area^{1}: 50.43 km^{2} (19.47 sq mi)
- Highest elevation: 818 m (2,684 ft)
- Lowest elevation: 315 m (1,033 ft)
- Population (2023): 410
  - Density: 8.1/km^{2} (21/sq mi)
- Time zone: UTC+01:00 (CET)
  - Summer (DST): UTC+02:00 (CEST)
- INSEE/Postal code: 58309 /58370
- ^{1} French Land Register data, which excludes lakes, ponds, glaciers > 1 km^{2} (0.386 sq mi or 247 acres) and river estuaries.

Villapourçon (French pronunciation: [vilapuʁsɔ̃]) is a commune in the Nièvre department in central France.

== Demographics ==
On 1 January 2020, the estimated population was 409.

== See also ==
- Communes of the Nièvre department
- Parc naturel régional du Morvan
