= Thaix =

- Commune
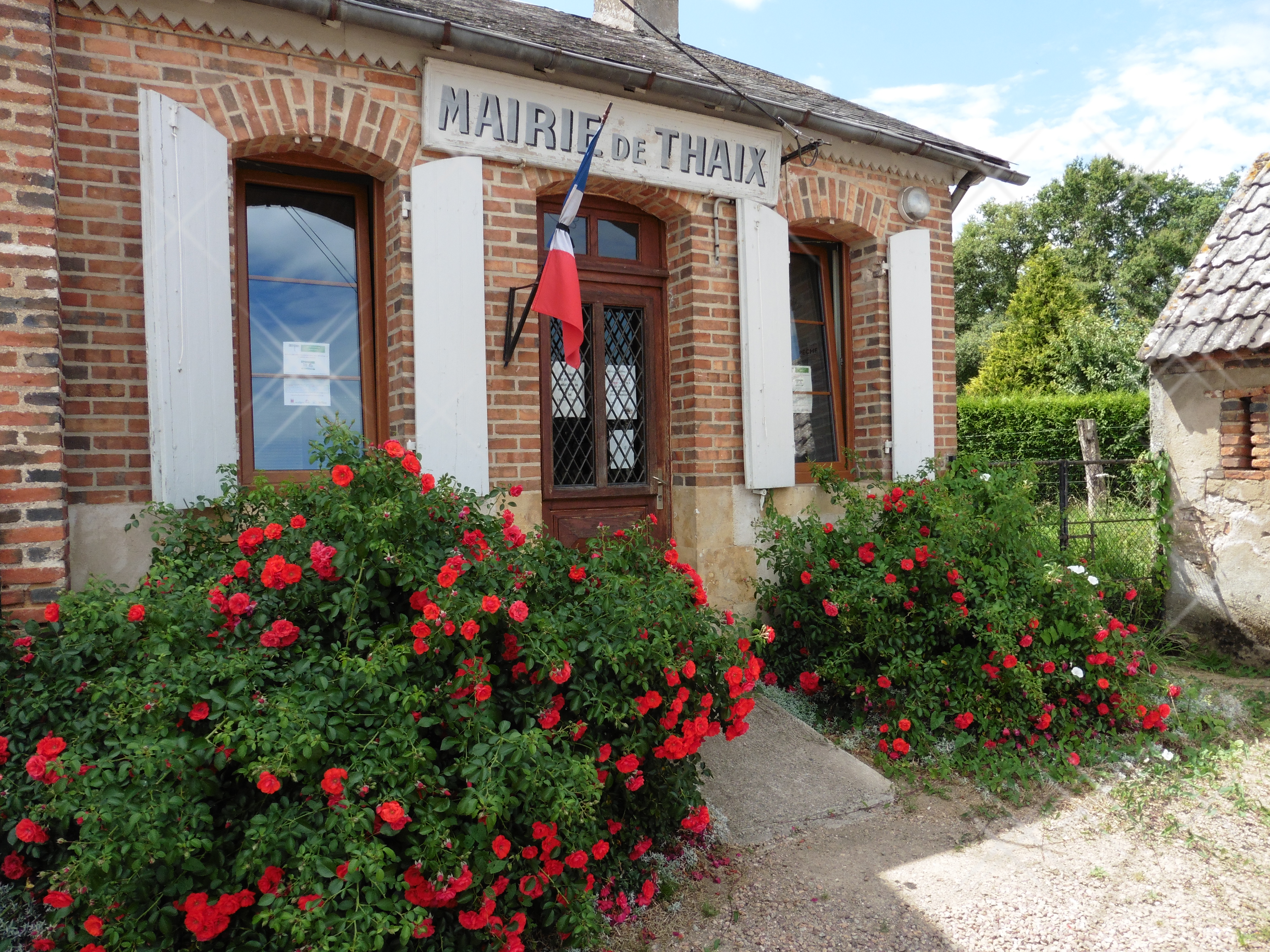
- Town hall
- Location of Thaix
- Location within France Location within Bourgogne-Franche-Comté
- Coordinates: 46°50′52″N 3°42′38″E
- Country: France
- Region: Bourgogne-Franche-Comté
- Department: Nièvre
- Arrondissement: Château-Chinon (Ville)
- Canton: Luzy

Government
  - Mayor (2020–2026): David Joyeux
- Area^{1}: 20.04 km^{2} (7.74 sq mi)
- Highest elevation: 256 m (840 ft)
- Lowest elevation: 196 m (643 ft)
- Population (2023): 42
  - Density: 2.1/km^{2} (5.4/sq mi)
- Time zone: UTC+01:00 (CET)
  - Summer (DST): UTC+02:00 (CEST)
- INSEE/Postal code: 58290 /58250
- ^{1} French Land Register data, which excludes lakes, ponds, glaciers > 1 km^{2} (0.386 sq mi or 247 acres) and river estuaries.

Thaix (French pronunciation: [tɛ]) is a commune in the Nièvre department in central France. As of 2023, the population of the commune was 42.

== Geography ==
The river Alène forms all of the commune's southern border.

== See also ==
- Communes of the Nièvre department
