= Cercy-la-Tour =

- Commune
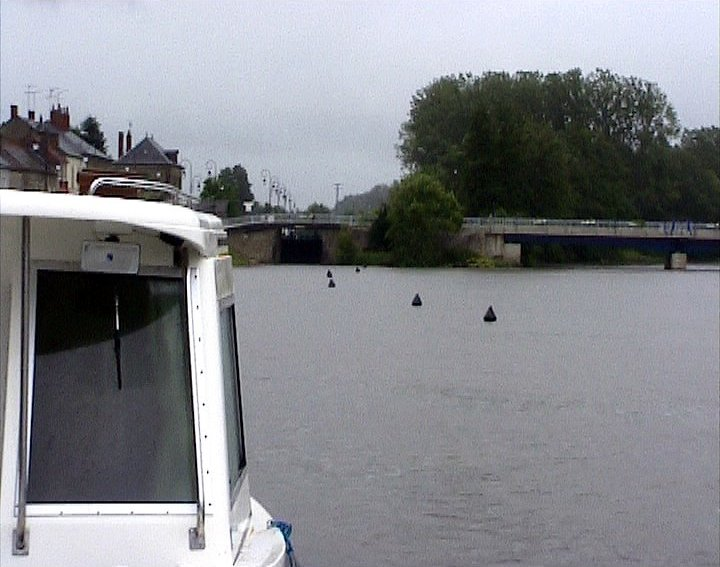
- River Aron in Cercy-la-Tour

- Coat of arms
- Location of Cercy-la-Tour
- Location within France Location within Bourgogne-Franche-Comté
- Coordinates: 46°52′10″N 3°38′45″E
- Country: France
- Region: Bourgogne-Franche-Comté
- Department: Nièvre
- Arrondissement: Château-Chinon
- Canton: Luzy
- Intercommunality: Bazois Loire Morvan

Government
  - Mayor (2020–2026): Sébastien Descreaux
- Area^{1}: 45.57 km^{2} (17.59 sq mi)
- Highest elevation: 253 m (830 ft)
- Lowest elevation: 191 m (627 ft)
- Population (2023): 1,653
  - Density: 36.27/km^{2} (93.95/sq mi)
- Time zone: UTC+01:00 (CET)
  - Summer (DST): UTC+02:00 (CEST)
- INSEE/Postal code: 58046 /58340
- ^{1} French Land Register data, which excludes lakes, ponds, glaciers > 1 km^{2} (0.386 sq mi or 247 acres) and river estuaries.

Cercy-la-Tour (French pronunciation: [sɛʁsi la tuʁ]; lit. 'Cercy-the-Tower') is a commune in the Nièvre department in central France.

== Geography ==
The village is located in the middle of the commune, where the river Alène joins the Aron.

== See also ==
- Communes of the Nièvre department
