= Saint-Hilaire-Fontaine =

- Commune
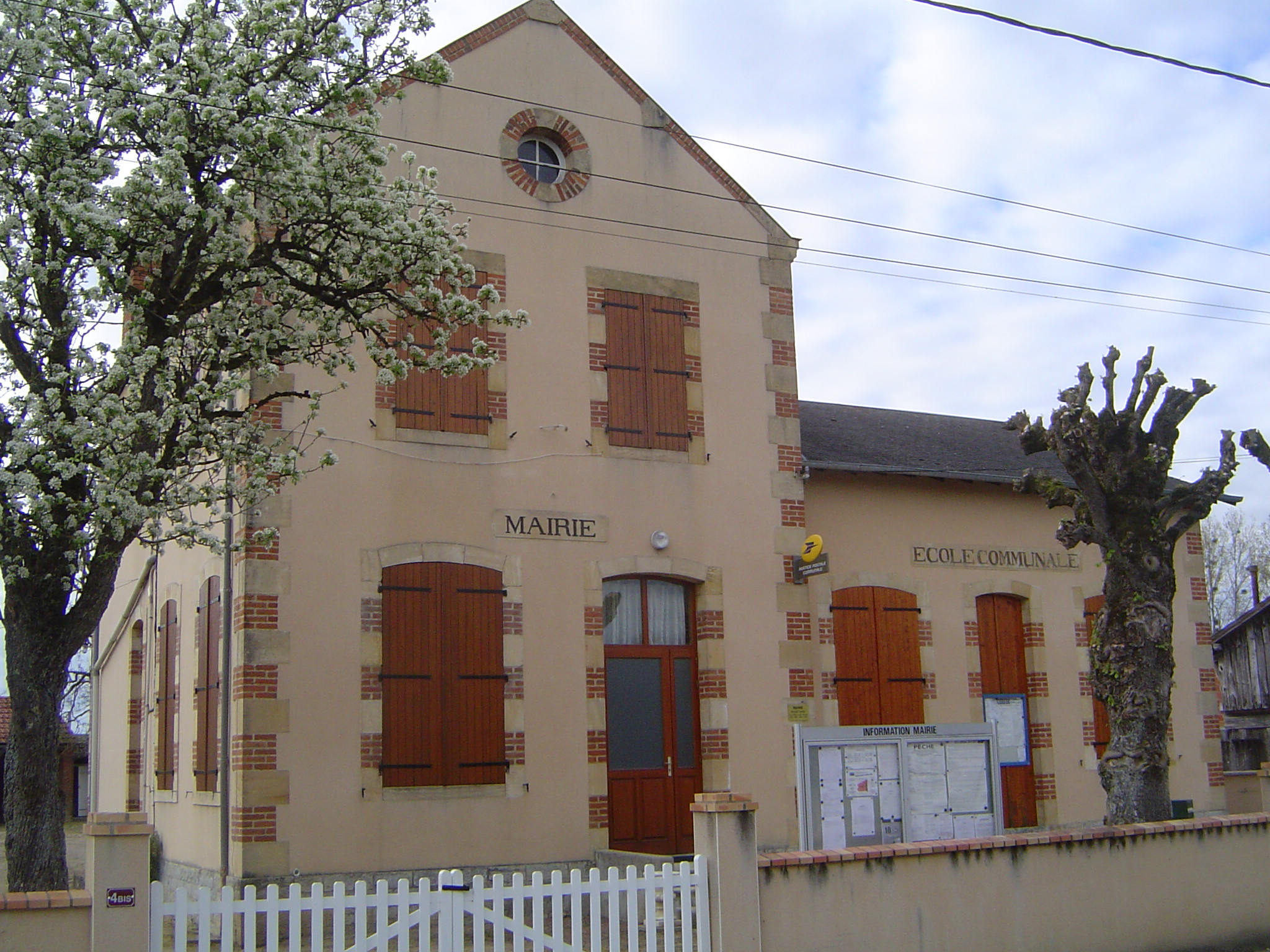
- The town hall and school in Saint-Hilaire-Fontaine
- Location of Saint-Hilaire-Fontaine
- Location within France Location within Bourgogne-Franche-Comté
- Coordinates: 46°46′05″N 3°37′41″E
- Country: France
- Region: Bourgogne-Franche-Comté
- Department: Nièvre
- Arrondissement: Château-Chinon (Ville)
- Canton: Luzy

Government
  - Mayor (2020–2026): Claude Royé
- Area^{1}: 23.37 km^{2} (9.02 sq mi)
- Highest elevation: 247 m (810 ft)
- Lowest elevation: 195 m (640 ft)
- Population (2023): 179
  - Density: 7.66/km^{2} (19.8/sq mi)
- Time zone: UTC+01:00 (CET)
  - Summer (DST): UTC+02:00 (CEST)
- INSEE/Postal code: 58245 /58300
- ^{1} French Land Register data, which excludes lakes, ponds, glaciers > 1 km^{2} (0.386 sq mi or 247 acres) and river estuaries.

Saint-Hilaire-Fontaine (French pronunciation: [sɛ̃.t‿ilɛʁ fɔ̃tɛn]) is a commune in the Nièvre department, in central France.

== See also ==
- Communes of the Nièvre department
