= Saint-Gratien-Savigny =

- Commune
- Location of Saint-Gratien-Savigny
- Location within France Location within Bourgogne-Franche-Comté
- Coordinates: 46°53′49″N 3°40′06″E
- Country: France
- Region: Bourgogne-Franche-Comté
- Department: Nièvre
- Arrondissement: Château-Chinon (Ville)
- Canton: Luzy

Government
  - Mayor (2020–2026): Jean-Paul Reverdiau
- Area^{1}: 19.53 km^{2} (7.54 sq mi)
- Highest elevation: 263 m (863 ft)
- Lowest elevation: 196 m (643 ft)
- Population (2023): 114
  - Density: 5.84/km^{2} (15.1/sq mi)
- Time zone: UTC+01:00 (CET)
  - Summer (DST): UTC+02:00 (CEST)
- INSEE/Postal code: 58243 /58340
- ^{1} French Land Register data, which excludes lakes, ponds, glaciers > 1 km^{2} (0.386 sq mi or 247 acres) and river estuaries.

Saint-Gratien-Savigny (French pronunciation: [sɛ̃ ɡʁasjɛ̃ saviɲi]) is a commune in the Nièvre department in central France.

== See also ==
- Communes of the Nièvre department
