= Millay, Nièvre =

Millay
- Commune
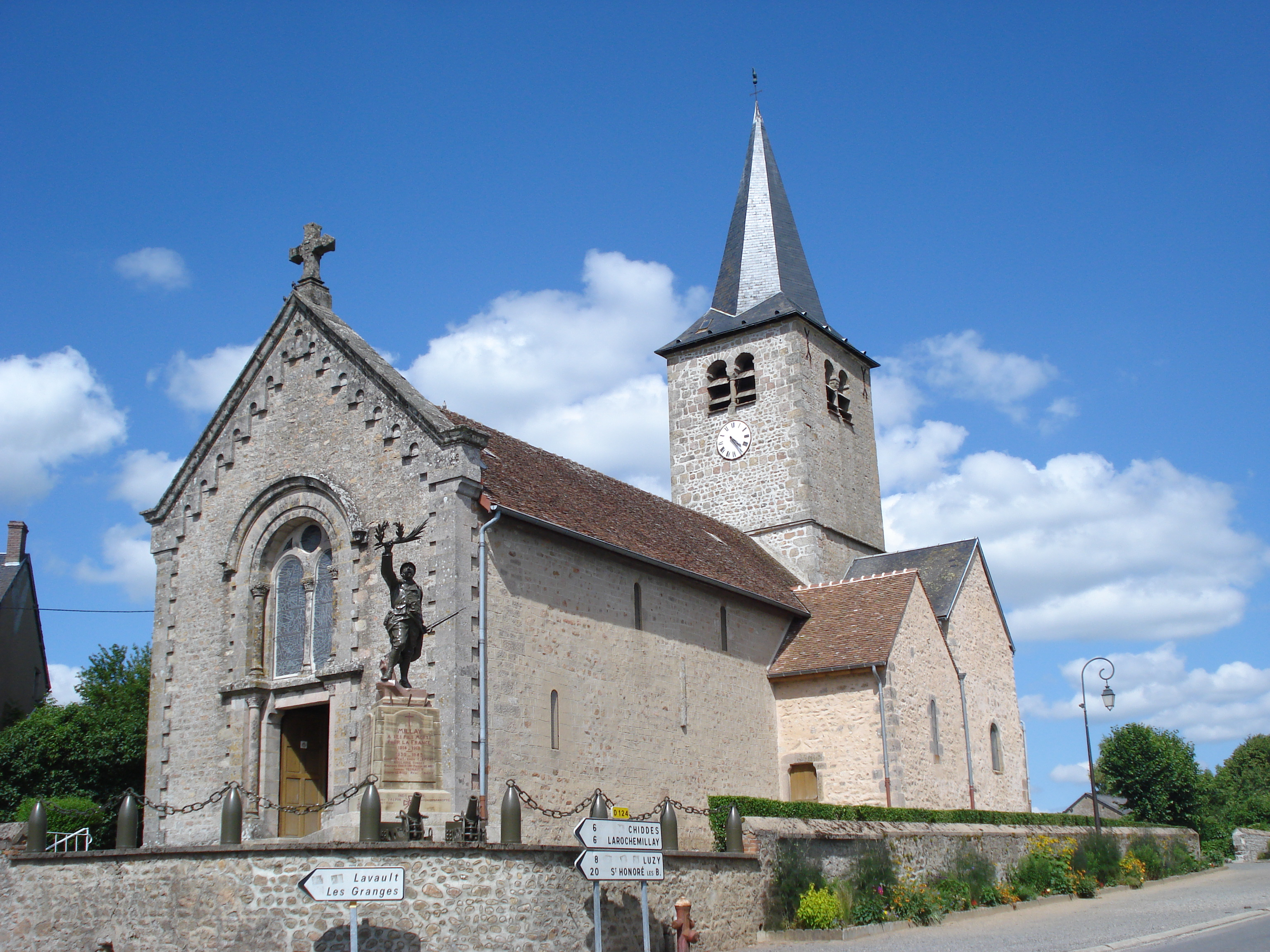
- The church and war memorial in Millay

- Coat of arms
- Location of Millay
- Location within France Location within Bourgogne-Franche-Comté
- Coordinates: 46°50′35″N 4°00′02″E
- Country: France
- Region: Bourgogne-Franche-Comté
- Department: Nièvre
- Arrondissement: Château-Chinon
- Canton: Luzy

Government
  - Mayor (2020–2026): Christian Pouchelet
- Area^{1}: 37.55 km^{2} (14.50 sq mi)
- Highest elevation: 465 m (1,526 ft)
- Lowest elevation: 255 m (837 ft)
- Population (2023): 440
  - Density: 12/km^{2} (30/sq mi)
- Time zone: UTC+01:00 (CET)
  - Summer (DST): UTC+02:00 (CEST)
- INSEE/Postal code: 58168 /58170
- ^{1} French Land Register data, which excludes lakes, ponds, glaciers > 1 km^{2} (0.386 sq mi or 247 acres) and river estuaries.

Millay is a commune in the Nièvre department in central France.

== Geography ==
The river Alène flows southward through the eastern part of the commune.

== Demographics ==
Historical population
Year	Pop.	±% p.a.
1968	776	—
1975	674	−1.99%
1982	627	−1.03%
1990	557	−1.47%
1999	490	−1.41%
2007	448	−1.11%
2012	453	+0.22%
2017	446	−0.31%
2023	440	−0.23%
Source: INSEE

== See also ==
- Communes of the Nièvre department
- Parc naturel régional du Morvan
