= Préporché =

- Commune
- Location of Préporché
- Location within France Location within Bourgogne-Franche-Comté
- Coordinates: 46°55′22″N 3°51′07″E
- Country: France
- Region: Bourgogne-Franche-Comté
- Department: Nièvre
- Arrondissement: Château-Chinon
- Canton: Luzy

Government
  - Mayor (2020–2026): René Duvernoy
- Area^{1}: 29.89 km^{2} (11.54 sq mi)
- Highest elevation: 631 m (2,070 ft)
- Lowest elevation: 224 m (735 ft)
- Population (2023): 212
  - Density: 7.09/km^{2} (18.4/sq mi)
- Time zone: UTC+01:00 (CET)
  - Summer (DST): UTC+02:00 (CEST)
- INSEE/Postal code: 58219 /58360
- ^{1} French Land Register data, which excludes lakes, ponds, glaciers > 1 km^{2} (0.386 sq mi or 247 acres) and river estuaries.

Préporché (French pronunciation: [pʁepɔʁʃe]) is a commune in the Nièvre department in central France.

== See also ==
- Communes of the Nièvre department
- Parc naturel régional du Morvan
