= Tazilly =

- Commune
- Location of Tazilly
- Location within France Location within Bourgogne-Franche-Comté
- Coordinates: 46°46′00″N 3°54′55″E
- Country: France
- Region: Bourgogne-Franche-Comté
- Department: Nièvre
- Arrondissement: Château-Chinon
- Canton: Luzy

Government
  - Mayor (2020–2026): Pascal Guerin
- Area^{1}: 25.81 km^{2} (9.97 sq mi)
- Highest elevation: 432 m (1,417 ft)
- Lowest elevation: 274 m (899 ft)
- Population (2023): 180
  - Density: 7.0/km^{2} (18/sq mi)
- Time zone: UTC+01:00 (CET)
  - Summer (DST): UTC+02:00 (CEST)
- INSEE/Postal code: 58287 /58170
- ^{1} French Land Register data, which excludes lakes, ponds, glaciers > 1 km^{2} (0.386 sq mi or 247 acres) and river estuaries.

Tazilly is a commune in the Nièvre department in the Bourgogne-Franche-Comté region of central France. The inhabitants are known as Tazillycois in French.

== Economy ==
The economy in Tazilly is mainly agricultural (breeding Charolais cattle) and tourism.

== History ==
During the Gallo-Roman era, Tazilly was located on the Roman road linking Decize and Autun. In 1853, the commune of Fléty was created from part of the commune of Tazilly.

== See also ==
- Communes of the Nièvre department
