= Saint-Seine =

- Commune
- Location of Saint-Seine
- Location within France Location within Bourgogne-Franche-Comté
- Coordinates: 46°44′05″N 3°49′29″E
- Country: France
- Region: Bourgogne-Franche-Comté
- Department: Nièvre
- Arrondissement: Château-Chinon (Ville)
- Canton: Luzy
- Intercommunality: Bazois Loire Morvan

Government
  - Mayor (2020–2026): Serge Sauvaget
- Area^{1}: 17.73 km^{2} (6.85 sq mi)
- Highest elevation: 321 m (1,053 ft)
- Lowest elevation: 220 m (720 ft)
- Population (2023): 187
  - Density: 10.5/km^{2} (27.3/sq mi)
- Time zone: UTC+01:00 (CET)
  - Summer (DST): UTC+02:00 (CEST)
- INSEE/Postal code: 58268 /58250
- ^{1} French Land Register data, which excludes lakes, ponds, glaciers > 1 km^{2} (0.386 sq mi or 247 acres) and river estuaries.

Saint-Seine (French pronunciation: [sɛ̃ sɛn]) is a commune in the Nièvre department in central France.

== See also ==
- Communes of the Nièvre department
