= Honoré Jacquinot =

French surgeon and zoologist (1815–1887)

- Born: 1 August 1815; Moulins-Engilbert, France
- Died: 22 May 1887 (aged 71); Nevers, France
- Known for: Describing 15 species of molluscs
- Relatives: Charles Hector Jacquinot (brother)
- Scientific career
- Fields: Surgeon and zoologist
- Workplaces: Astrolabe expedition
- Author abbrev. (zoology): Jacquinot

Honoré Jacquinot (pronounced [ɔnɔʁe ʒakino]; 1 August 1815 in Moulins-Engilbert – 22 May 1887 in Nevers) was a French surgeon and zoologist. Jacquinot was the younger brother of the naval officer Charles Hector Jacquinot, and sailed with him as a surgeon and naturalist on La Zelée on Dumont d'Urville's Astrolabe expedition (1837–1840).

In 1837 with J. B. Hombron, while en route to the Antarctic aboard the Astrolabe and anchored off the coast of New Zealand, he was able to describe and illustrate 15 species of molluscs found in those waters, plus several species of fish and crustacea.

== See also ==
- European and American voyages of scientific exploration
