= Aron (Loire) =

River in central France

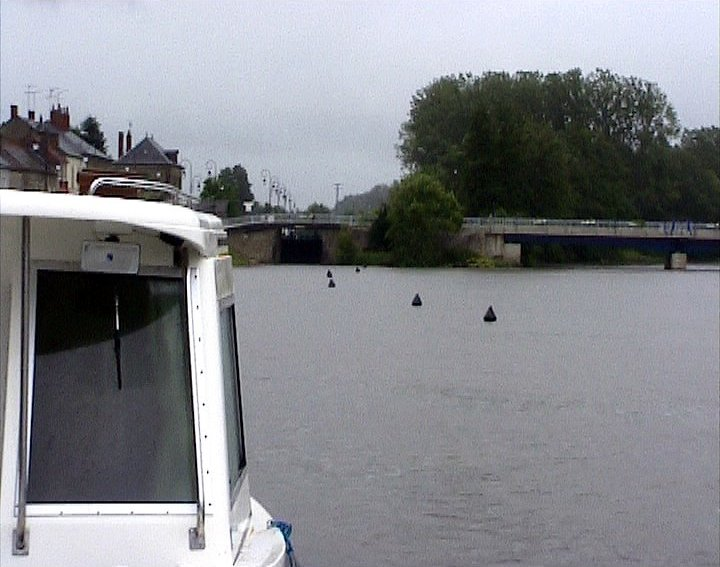

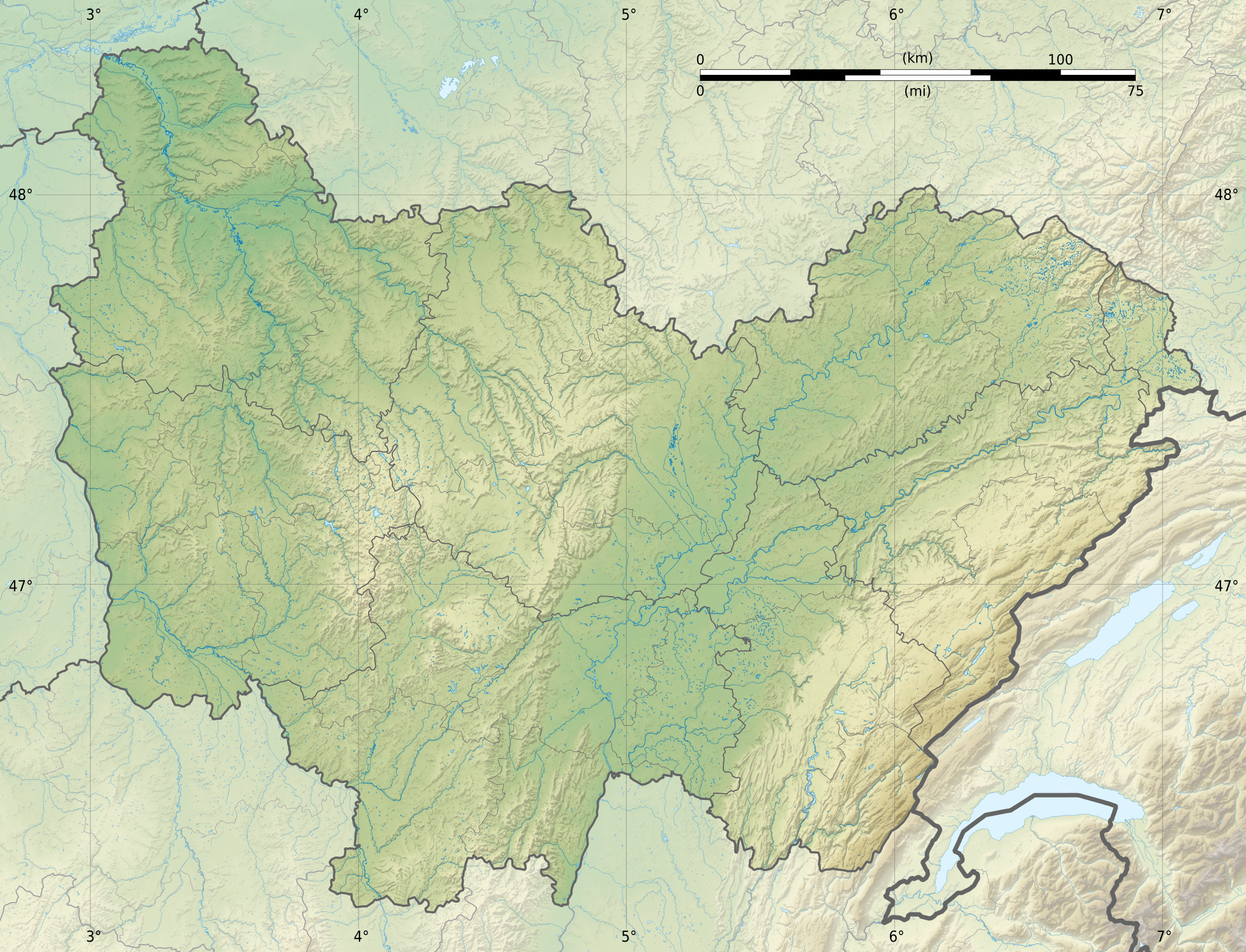
- Location within France Location within Bourgogne-Franche-Comté

Location
- Country: France

Physical characteristics
- Mouth
  - location: Loire
  - coordinates: 46°50′12″N 3°27′9″E
- Length: 103.8 km (64.5 mi)

Basin features
- Progression: Loire→ Atlantic Ocean

The Aron (French pronunciation: [aʁɔ̃]) is a 103.8-kilometre (64.5 mi) long river in central France. It is a right tributary of the Loire, which it meets at Decize. It flows through the department of Nièvre.

== Course ==
The source of the Aron is in the commune of Crux-la-Ville, about 35 kilometres (22 mi) north-east of Nevers. It flows in a southerly direction, through the towns of Châtillon-en-Bazois and Cercy-la-Tour, and empties into the Loire at Decize. For much of its length, from Châtillon-en-Bazois to Decize, the river flows parallel to the Canal du Nivernais.

Among its tributaries is the Alène.
