= Lanty, Nièvre =

Lanty
- Commune
- Coat of arms
- Location of Lanty
- Location within France Location within Bourgogne-Franche-Comté
- Coordinates: 46°48′40″N 3°50′31″E
- Country: France
- Region: Bourgogne-Franche-Comté
- Department: Nièvre
- Arrondissement: Château-Chinon
- Canton: Luzy

Government
  - Mayor (2020–2026): Annick Bertrand
- Area^{1}: 12.06 km^{2} (4.66 sq mi)
- Highest elevation: 367 m (1,204 ft)
- Lowest elevation: 224 m (735 ft)
- Population (2023): 126
  - Density: 10.4/km^{2} (27.1/sq mi)
- Time zone: UTC+01:00 (CET)
  - Summer (DST): UTC+02:00 (CEST)
- INSEE/Postal code: 58139 /58250
- ^{1} French Land Register data, which excludes lakes, ponds, glaciers > 1 km^{2} (0.386 sq mi or 247 acres) and river estuaries.

Lanty (French pronunciation: [lɑ̃ti]) is a commune in the Nièvre department in central in Bourgogne-Franche-Comté.

Its inhabitants are called the Lantyçois.

== Geography ==
=== Climate ===
In 2010, the climate of the municipality is of the type degraded oceanic climate of the plains of the Center and the North, according to a study by the National Centre for Scientific Research based on a series of data covering the period from 1971 to 2000. In 2020, Météo-France published a typology of the climates of mainland France in which the municipality is exposed to an altered oceanic climate and is in the climatic region of the Center and northern foothills of the Massif Central, characterized by dry air in summer and good sunshine.

For the period 1971–2000, the average annual temperature was 10.6 °C, with an annual temperature range of 16.6 °C. The average annual precipitation total was 925 mm, with 12.7 days of precipitation in January and 7.7 days in July. For the period 1991–2020, the average annual temperature observed at the nearest Météo-France weather station, "Avrée," located 2 km away in the municipality of Avrée, was 11.7 °C, and the average annual precipitation total was 884.8 mm. The highest temperature recorded at this station was 40.5 °C, reached on 24 July 2019; the lowest temperature was −13.9 °C, recorded on 7 February 2012.

The climate parameters of the municipality have been estimated for the middle of the century (2041–2070) according to different greenhouse gas emission scenarios based on the new reference climate projections DRIAS-2020. These projections are available on a dedicated website published by Météo-France in November 2022.

== Urbanism ==
=== Typology ===
As of 1 January 2024, Lanty is classified as a rural municipality with very dispersed housing, according to the new seven-level municipal density grid defined by INSEE in 2022. It is located outside any urban unit and beyond the influence of cities.

=== The Land ===
The land use of the municipality, as recorded in the European Corine Land Cover (CLC) database, highlights the predominance of agricultural areas (62.3% in 2018), a proportion unchanged since 1990 (62.3%). The detailed distribution in 2018 is as follows: grasslands (45.7%), forests (34.4%), heterogeneous agricultural areas (11.1%), arable land (5.4%), and urbanized areas (3.3%). The evolution of land use and infrastructure in the municipality can be observed through various cartographic representations of the territory: the Cassini map (18th century), the state-major map (1820–1866), and the maps or aerial photographs from the IGN covering the period from 1950 to today.

== Demographics ==
The population evolution of the municipality has been recorded through censuses conducted since 1793. For municipalities with fewer than 10,000 inhabitants, a full population survey is carried out every five years, while population figures for intermediate years are estimated through interpolation or extrapolation. The first comprehensive census under the new system was conducted in 2007.

In 2022, the municipality had 122 inhabitants, reflecting a −0.81% change compared to 2016 (Nièvre: −3.28%, France excluding Mayotte: +2.11%).

== Places and Monuments ==
- The Church of the Nativity of the Virgin of Lanty, parish church in Romanesque style from the 12th century. Its simple and elongated plan features a bell tower followed by a slightly narrower straight nave. The nave is elevated, with a vaulted ribbed ceiling, which has obscured the western openings of the bell tower. The choir consists of a circular apse vaulted in a cul-de-four shape, with small arrow-slit windows in the apse and the south wall of the choir. The choir bay is vaulted in a basket-handle style, with fitted arches separating it from the apse and the nave. The sacristy is attached to the left wall of the choir. The bell tower is squat and of low elevation, shaped like a square tower. It has two arched openings, separated by a small column with a sculpted capital on its three faces: north, east, and south, topped with a four-sided slate roof. Among the furniture, a noteworthy piece is a waxed wooden altar with relief carvings dating from the late 18th century (Historical Monument). The church underwent alterations in the 19th century.
- The Sacred Fountain of the Good Lady is located just a few steps from the church, down a path towards the RN 81. It was once the site of a pilgrimage.
- The Fort of Lanty is a 12th-century seigniorial house that likely disappeared in the 18th century. It is located a few hundred meters south of the church, in the middle of the fields. Today, its outlines are still visible, consisting of a large mound surrounded by moats, with only a few remnants of walls that are barely noticeable. This residence had famous owners, including Françoise de Rabutin, daughter of the writer Roger de Bussy-Rabutin. This young woman, who became a widow at a young age, married a friend, François de Rivière. Her furious father came to the château, took his daughter, and imprisoned her. A trial followed, which forced the father to release his daughter, who was then reunited with her husband and children.

== Related Persons ==
- Françoise de Rabutin.

== See also ==
- Communes of the Nièvre department
