= Charrin =

- Commune
- Location of Charrin
- Location within France Location within Bourgogne-Franche-Comté
- Coordinates: 46°47′22″N 3°35′56″E
- Country: France
- Region: Bourgogne-Franche-Comté
- Department: Nièvre
- Arrondissement: Château-Chinon (Ville)
- Canton: Luzy

Government
  - Mayor (2020–2026): Serge Caillot
- Area^{1}: 26.30 km^{2} (10.15 sq mi)
- Highest elevation: 243 m (797 ft)
- Lowest elevation: 190 m (620 ft)
- Population (2023): 605
  - Density: 23.0/km^{2} (59.6/sq mi)
- Time zone: UTC+01:00 (CET)
  - Summer (DST): UTC+02:00 (CEST)
- INSEE/Postal code: 58060 /58300
- ^{1} French Land Register data, which excludes lakes, ponds, glaciers > 1 km^{2} (0.386 sq mi or 247 acres) and river estuaries.

Charrin (French pronunciation: [ʃaʁɛ̃]) is a commune in the Nièvre department in central France.

== See also ==
- Communes of the Nièvre department
