= La Nocle-Maulaix =

- Commune
- Location of La Nocle-Maulaix
- Location within France Location within Bourgogne-Franche-Comté
- Coordinates: 46°45′51″N 3°46′55″E
- Country: France
- Region: Bourgogne-Franche-Comté
- Department: Nièvre
- Arrondissement: Château-Chinon (Ville)
- Canton: Luzy

Government
  - Mayor (2020–2026): Pascal Perrin
- Area^{1}: 32.66 km^{2} (12.61 sq mi)
- Highest elevation: 267 m (876 ft)
- Lowest elevation: 206 m (676 ft)
- Population (2023): 267
  - Density: 8.18/km^{2} (21.2/sq mi)
- Time zone: UTC+01:00 (CET)
  - Summer (DST): UTC+02:00 (CEST)
- INSEE/Postal code: 58195 /58250
- ^{1} French Land Register data, which excludes lakes, ponds, glaciers > 1 km^{2} (0.386 sq mi or 247 acres) and river estuaries.

La Nocle-Maulaix (French pronunciation: [la nɔkl molɛ]) is a commune in the Nièvre department in central France.

== See also ==
- Communes of the Nièvre department
