= Canton of Luzy =

Coordinates: 46.79°N 3.97°E

The canton of Luzy is an administrative division of the Nièvre department, central France. Its borders were modified at the French canton reorganisation which came into effect in March 2015. Its seat is in Luzy.

It consists of the following communes:

1. Avrée
2. Cercy-la-Tour
3. Charrin
4. Chiddes
5. Fléty
6. Fours
7. Isenay
8. Lanty
9. Larochemillay
10. Luzy
11. Maux
12. Millay
13. Montambert
14. Montaron
15. Montigny-sur-Canne
16. Moulins-Engilbert
17. La Nocle-Maulaix
18. Poil
19. Préporché
20. Rémilly
21. Saint-Gratien-Savigny
22. Saint-Hilaire-Fontaine
23. Saint-Honoré-les-Bains
24. Saint-Seine
25. Savigny-Poil-Fol
26. Sémelay
27. Sermages
28. Tazilly
29. Ternant
30. Thaix
31. Vandenesse
32. Villapourçon
