= Sémelay =

- Commune
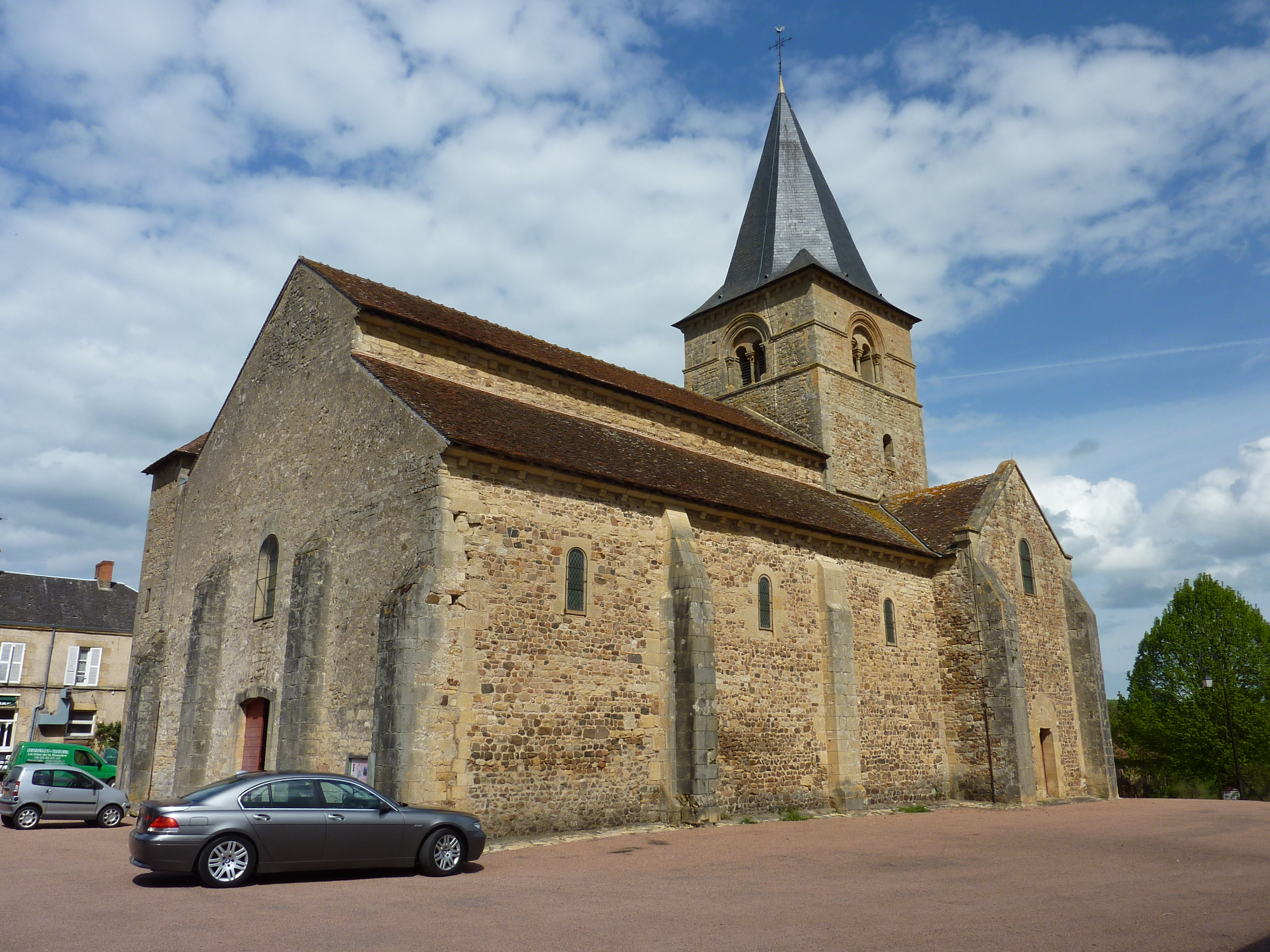
- The church in Sémelay
- Location of Sémelay
- Location within France Location within Bourgogne-Franche-Comté
- Coordinates: 46°51′09″N 3°51′07″E
- Country: France
- Region: Bourgogne-Franche-Comté
- Department: Nièvre
- Arrondissement: Château-Chinon (Ville)
- Canton: Luzy

Government
  - Mayor (2020–2026): Guy Laffaye
- Area^{1}: 33.53 km^{2} (12.95 sq mi)
- Highest elevation: 530 m (1,740 ft)
- Lowest elevation: 227 m (745 ft)
- Population (2023): 223
  - Density: 6.65/km^{2} (17.2/sq mi)
- Time zone: UTC+01:00 (CET)
  - Summer (DST): UTC+02:00 (CEST)
- INSEE/Postal code: 58276 /58360
- ^{1} French Land Register data, which excludes lakes, ponds, glaciers > 1 km^{2} (0.386 sq mi or 247 acres) and river estuaries.

Sémelay (French pronunciation: [semlɛ]) is a commune in the Nièvre department in central France. The town of Sémelay belongs to the canton of Luzy and the arrondissement of Château-Chinon (Ville).

== Geography ==
The river Alène flows westward through the southern part of commune.

The town's area is 33.53 km^{2}. It is situated at an altitude of about 294 meters.

== See also ==
- Communes of the Nièvre department
