= Avrée =

- Commune
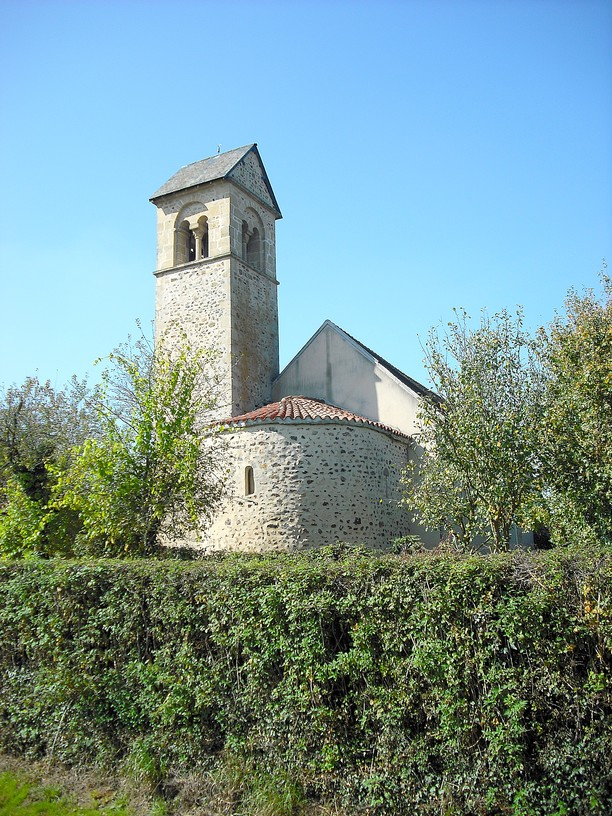
- The church of Sainte-Madeleine, in Avrée
- Location of Avrée
- Location within France Location within Bourgogne-Franche-Comté
- Coordinates: 46°49′10″N 3°52′13″E
- Country: France
- Region: Bourgogne-Franche-Comté
- Department: Nièvre
- Arrondissement: Château-Chinon (Ville)
- Canton: Luzy
- Intercommunality: CC Bazois Loire Morvan

Government
  - Mayor (2020–2026): Georges Château
- Area^{1}: 13.03 km^{2} (5.03 sq mi)
- Highest elevation: 346 m (1,135 ft)
- Lowest elevation: 234 m (768 ft)
- Population (2023): 83
  - Density: 6.4/km^{2} (16/sq mi)
- Time zone: UTC+01:00 (CET)
  - Summer (DST): UTC+02:00 (CEST)
- INSEE/Postal code: 58019 /58170
- ^{1} French Land Register data, which excludes lakes, ponds, glaciers > 1 km^{2} (0.386 sq mi or 247 acres) and river estuaries.

Avrée (French pronunciation: [avʁe]) is a commune in the Nièvre department in central France.

== Geography ==
The river Alène flows northwest through the commune.

== Population ==
Historical population
Year	Pop.	±% p.a.
1968	141	—
1975	108	−3.74%
1982	119	+1.40%
1990	93	−3.03%
1999	99	+0.70%
2007	93	−0.78%
2012	93	+0.00%
2017	80	−2.97%
2023	83	+0.62%
Source: INSEE

== See also ==
- Communes of the Nièvre department
