= Sermaise =

Sermaise may refer to:

- Sermaise, Maine-et-Loire, a commune of the Pays de la Loire region of France
- Sermaise, Essonne, a commune of the Île-de-France region
