= Fléty =

- Commune
- Location of Fléty
- Location within France Location within Bourgogne-Franche-Comté
- Coordinates: 46°47′27″N 3°54′14″E
- Country: France
- Region: Bourgogne-Franche-Comté
- Department: Nièvre
- Arrondissement: Château-Chinon
- Canton: Luzy
- Intercommunality: Bazois Loire Morvan

Government
  - Mayor (2020–2026): Romain Cougny
- Area^{1}: 20.06 km^{2} (7.75 sq mi)
- Highest elevation: 417 m (1,368 ft)
- Lowest elevation: 243 m (797 ft)
- Population (2023): 94
  - Density: 4.7/km^{2} (12/sq mi)
- Time zone: UTC+01:00 (CET)
  - Summer (DST): UTC+02:00 (CEST)
- INSEE/Postal code: 58114 /58170
- ^{1} French Land Register data, which excludes lakes, ponds, glaciers > 1 km^{2} (0.386 sq mi or 247 acres) and river estuaries.

Fléty (French pronunciation: [fleti]) is a commune in the Nièvre department in central France. It was created in 1853 from part of the commune of Tazilly.

== Geography ==
The river Alène flows westward through the commune.

== Demographics ==
Historical population
Year	Pop.	±% p.a.
1968	296	—
1975	240	−2.95%
1982	225	−0.92%
1990	183	−2.55%
1999	142	−2.78%
2007	135	−0.63%
2012	115	−3.16%
2017	103	−2.18%
2023	94	−1.51%
Source: INSEE

== See also ==
- Communes of the Nièvre department
