= Chiddes, Nièvre =

Chiddes
- Commune
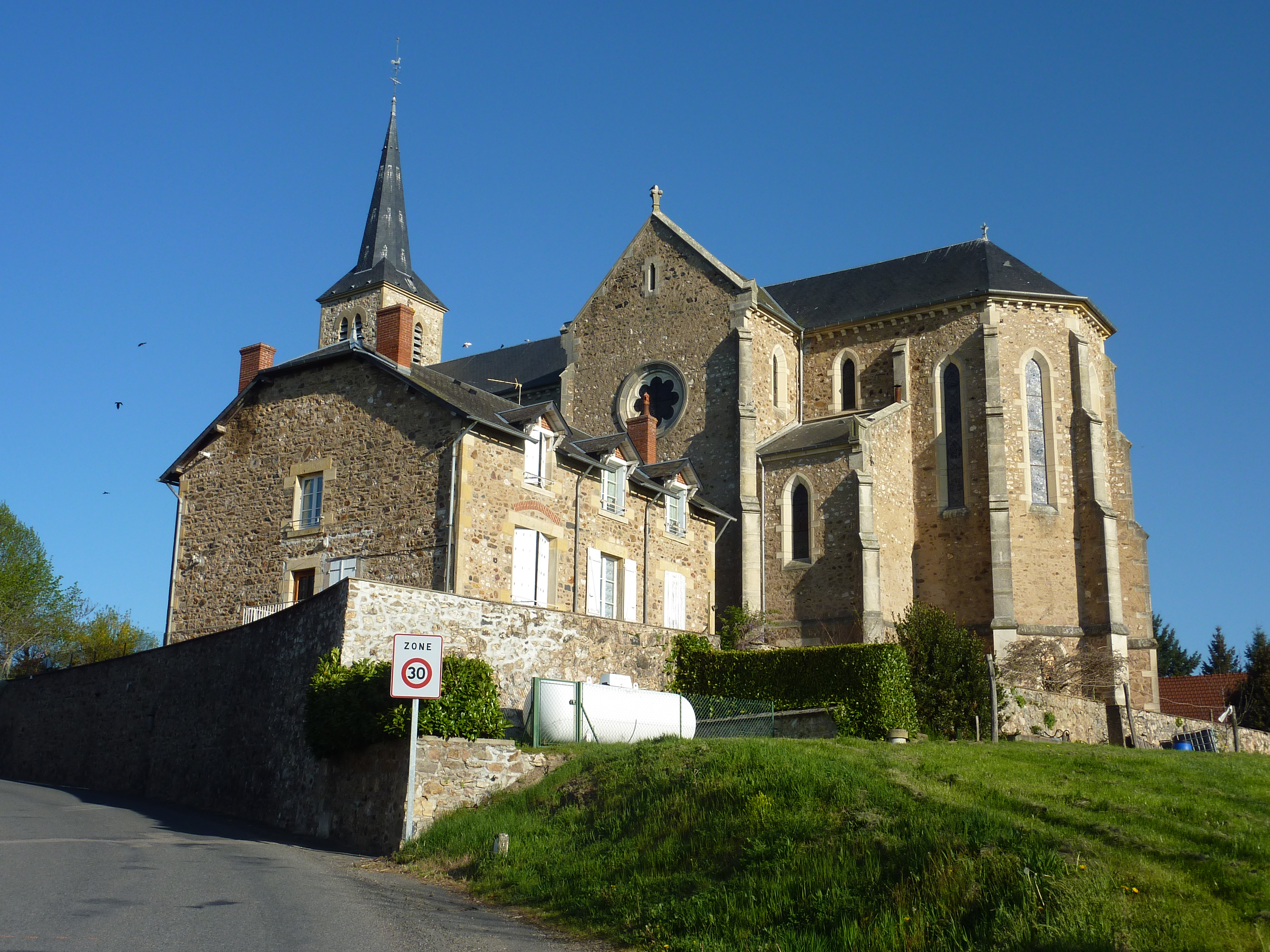
- The church in Chiddes
- Location of Chiddes
- Location within France Location within Bourgogne-Franche-Comté
- Coordinates: 46°51′42″N 3°56′29″E
- Country: France
- Region: Bourgogne-Franche-Comté
- Department: Nièvre
- Arrondissement: Château-Chinon (Ville)
- Canton: Luzy

Government
  - Mayor (2020–2026): Bernadette Voilliot
- Area^{1}: 26.04 km^{2} (10.05 sq mi)
- Highest elevation: 515 m (1,690 ft)
- Lowest elevation: 244 m (801 ft)
- Population (2023): 353
  - Density: 13.6/km^{2} (35.1/sq mi)
- Time zone: UTC+01:00 (CET)
  - Summer (DST): UTC+02:00 (CEST)
- INSEE/Postal code: 58074 /58170
- ^{1} French Land Register data, which excludes lakes, ponds, glaciers > 1 km^{2} (0.386 sq mi or 247 acres) and river estuaries.

Chiddes (French pronunciation: [ʃid]) is a commune in the Nièvre department in central France.

== History ==
The toponymy of Chiddes is unclear (probably of Gallo-Roman or Celtic origin like many towns in the region), but is first attested as Chides in the 1300s.

Despite now being a small village, Chiddes has a rich history, filled with folklore and legends back to Antiquity, such as relating to Roman artefacts of Emperors like Alexander Severus and Diocletian, pagan stones, Saint Maurice (even being called "the country of St. Maurice" despite him most likely never setting foot there), Saint Martin of Tours and his donkey and a vicious-turn-tamed bear, St. Gangulphus, local lords and fiefs, the French Wars of Religion, and more.

== Demographics ==
According to the 1999 census, the population was 373. On 1 January 2019, the estimate was 339.

== See also ==
- Communes of the Nièvre department
