= Saint-Honoré-les-Bains =

- Commune
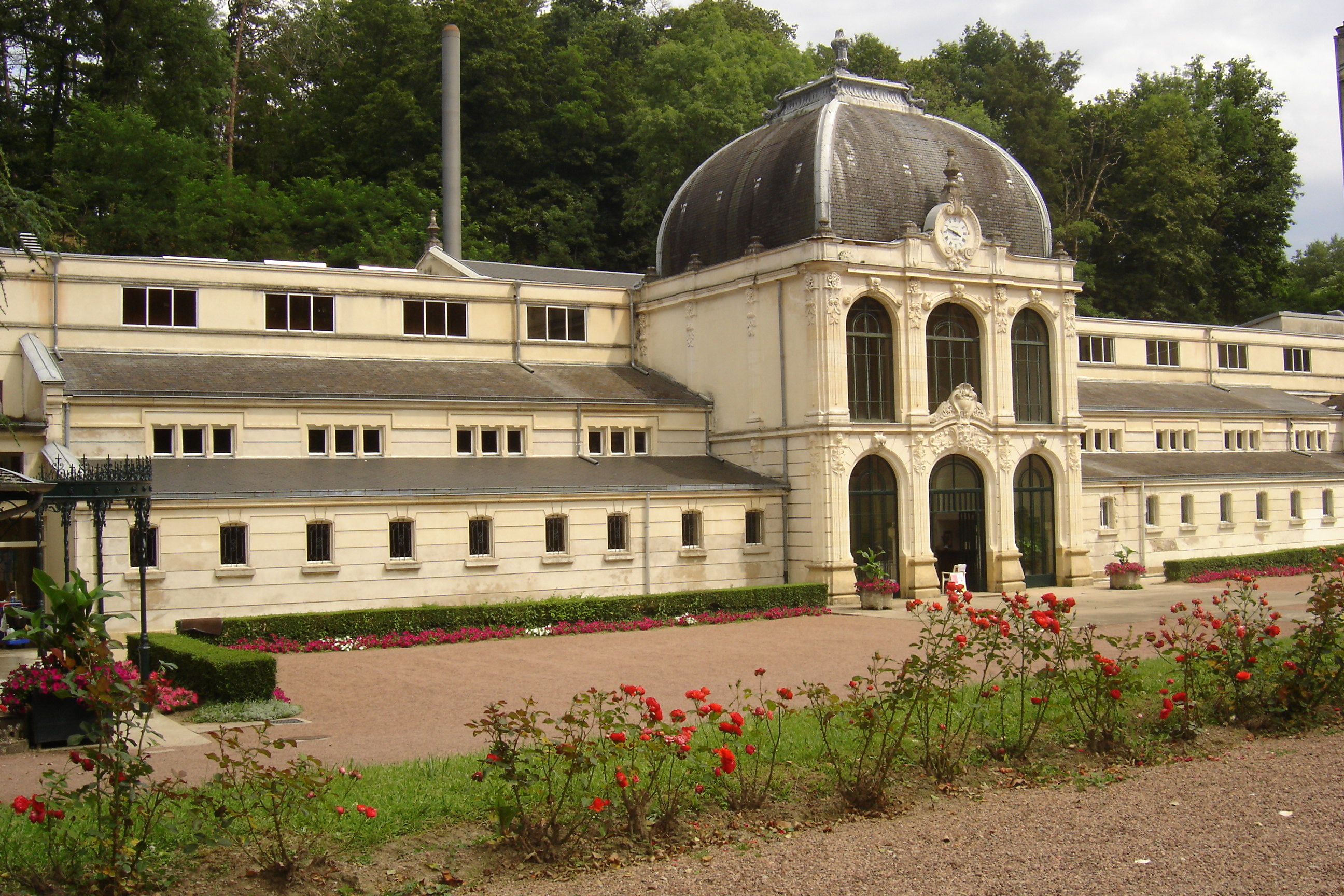
- Thermes

- Coat of arms
- Location of Saint-Honoré-les-Bains
- Location within France Location within Bourgogne-Franche-Comté
- Coordinates: 46°54′24″N 3°50′28″E
- Country: France
- Region: Bourgogne-Franche-Comté
- Department: Nièvre
- Arrondissement: Château-Chinon
- Canton: Luzy
- Intercommunality: CC Bazois Loire Morvan

Government
  - Mayor (2020–2026): Didier Bourlon
- Area^{1}: 25.12 km^{2} (9.70 sq mi)
- Highest elevation: 555 m (1,821 ft)
- Lowest elevation: 222 m (728 ft)
- Population (2023): 678
  - Density: 27.0/km^{2} (69.9/sq mi)
- Demonym: Saint-Honoréens
- Time zone: UTC+01:00 (CET)
  - Summer (DST): UTC+02:00 (CEST)
- INSEE/Postal code: 58246 /58360
- ^{1} French Land Register data, which excludes lakes, ponds, glaciers > 1 km^{2} (0.386 sq mi or 247 acres) and river estuaries.

Saint-Honoré-les-Bains (French pronunciation: [sɛ̃t‿ɔnɔʁe le bɛ̃]; lit. 'St Honoré-the-Baths'; until 1974 simply Saint-Honoré) is a rural commune in the Nièvre department in east-central France. It is part of Morvan Regional Natural Park.

== See also ==
- Communes of the Nièvre department
- Morvan Regional Natural Park
