= Maux, Nièvre =

Maux
- Commune
- Location of Maux
- Location within France Location within Bourgogne-Franche-Comté
- Coordinates: 47°02′56″N 3°46′57″E
- Country: France
- Region: Bourgogne-Franche-Comté
- Department: Nièvre
- Arrondissement: Château-Chinon
- Canton: Luzy

Government
  - Mayor (2020–2026): Danièle Péraudin
- Area^{1}: 22.60 km^{2} (8.73 sq mi)
- Highest elevation: 329 m (1,079 ft)
- Lowest elevation: 217 m (712 ft)
- Population (2023): 140
  - Density: 6.2/km^{2} (16/sq mi)
- Time zone: UTC+01:00 (CET)
  - Summer (DST): UTC+02:00 (CEST)
- INSEE/Postal code: 58161 /58290
- ^{1} French Land Register data, which excludes lakes, ponds, glaciers > 1 km^{2} (0.386 sq mi or 247 acres) and river estuaries.

Maux (French pronunciation: [mo]) is a commune in the Nièvre department in central France.

== History ==
The commune was formed from the merger of two parishes: Maux and Abon.

In 1260, Jean, a knight and lord of Châtillon-en-Bazois, donated his possessions in Urcey for the anniversary of his parents, including the fief held by the widow of Knight Gui de Digoine, also located in Urcey. He also mentioned properties in Montchamois, Vauzelles, Abbon, and Marzy. The Digoine family, which at the time held lands in Avallonnais (Marmeaux) and Auxois (Nan-sous-Thil) and was the lord of Coddes in Cercy-la-Tour, later moved to Charolais, settling in Moleron (Vaudebarrier).

== See also ==
- Communes of the Nièvre department
