= La Reine Margot (1994 film) =

1994 film by Patrice Chéreau

- Theatrical release poster
- Directed by: Patrice Chéreau
- Screenplay by: Danièle Thompson; Patrice Chéreau
- Adaptation by: Danièle Thompson; Patrice Chéreau
- Dialogue by: Danièle Thompson
- Based on: La Reine Margot by Alexandre Dumas
- Produced by: Claude Berri
- Starring: Isabelle Adjani; Daniel Auteuil; Jean-Hugues Anglade; Vincent Perez; Virna Lisi; Dominique Blanc; Pascal Greggory; Claudio Amendola; Miguel Bosé; Asia Argento; Julien Rassam; Thomas Kretschmann; Jean-Claude Brialy
- Cinematography: Philippe Rousselot
- Edited by: François Gédigier; Hélène Viard
- Music by: Goran Bregović
- Production companies: Renn Productions; France 2 Cinéma; D.A. Films; N.E.F. Filmproduktion; Degeto; ARD; WMG; RCS Films & TV
- Distributed by: AMLF
- Release dates: 13 May 1994 (France); 26 August 1994 (Italy); 29 September 1994 (Germany)
- Running time: 162 minutes
- Countries: France; Italy; Germany
- Languages: French; Italian
- Box office: $20 million

La Reine Margot (French: [la ʁɛn maʁɡo]) is a 1994 historical romantic drama film directed by Patrice Chéreau, from a screenplay he co-wrote with Danièle Thompson, based on the 1845 historical novel of the same name by Alexandre Dumas. The film stars Isabelle Adjani, Daniel Auteuil, Jean-Hugues Anglade, Vincent Perez, and Virna Lisi. An abridged version of the film was released as Queen Margot in North America, and in the United Kingdom under its original French title.

La Reine Margot premiered at the 1994 Cannes Film Festival where it won the Jury Prize and the Best Actress Award for Lisi. It received twelve nominations at the 20th César Awards, including Best Film, and won five, with Adjani, Anglade, and Lisi winning for Best Actress, Best Supporting Actor, and Best Supporting Actress, respectively. The film was also nominated for Best Costume Design at the 67th Academy Awards. A restored version was shown as part of the Cannes Classics section of the 2013 Cannes Film Festival.

== Plot ==
During the late 16th century, Catholics and Protestant Huguenots are fighting over political control of France, which is ruled by the neurotic, hypochondriac King Charles IX, and his mother, Catherine de' Medici, a scheming power player. Catherine decides to make an overture of goodwill by offering up her daughter Margot in marriage to Henri de Bourbon, a prominent Huguenot and King of Navarre. She wants to diplomatically spare the sensibilities of Pope Gregory XIII and Spain on the one hand, and the Protestant states on the other, and above all appease the hatred and rivalries within the kingdom between the Catholic party of Duke Henri de Guise (Miguel Bosé) and the Protestant faction led by Admiral Gaspard de Coligny (Jean-Claude Brialy). Soon after, she schemes to bring about the notorious St. Bartholomew's Day Massacre of 1572, when thousands of Protestants are slaughtered.

The marriage goes forward but Margot, who does not love Henri, begins a passionate affair with the soldier La Môle, also a Protestant from a well-to-do family. Murders by poisoning follow, as court intrigues multiply and Queen Catherine's villainous plotting to place her son the Duke of Anjou on the throne threatens the lives of La Môle, Margot and Henri of Navarre. A book with pages painted with arsenic is intended for Henri but instead causes the slow, agonizing death of King Charles. Henri escapes to Navarre and sends La Môle to fetch Margot, but Guise apprehends him. La Môle is beheaded in the Bastille before Margot can save him, and King Charles finally dies. Margot escapes carrying La Môle's embalmed head as Anjou is proclaimed King of France as Henry III.

== Cast ==
- Isabelle Adjani as Margaret of Valois, "Queen Margot"
- Daniel Auteuil as Henri de Bourbon, future Henry IV
- Jean-Hugues Anglade as Charles IX
- Vincent Perez as La Môle
- Virna Lisi as Catherine de' Medici
- Dominique Blanc as Henriette de Nevers
- Pascal Greggory as Henri, Duke of Anjou, later Henry III
- Claudio Amendola as Coconnas
- Miguel Bosé as Henry I, Duke of Guise
- Asia Argento as Charlotte de Sauve
- Julien Rassam as François, Duke of Alençon
- Thomas Kretschmann as Nançay
- Jean-Claude Brialy as Admiral de Coligny
- Jean-Philippe Écoffey as Condé
- Johan Leysen as Maurevel
- Laure Marsac as Antoinette
- Barbet Schroeder as an advisor
- Otto Tausig as Mendès
- Bruno Todeschini as Armagnac
- Bernard Verley as the cardinal
- Valeria Bruni Tedeschi as a courtesan
- Hélène de Fougerolles as a courtesan
- Grégoire Colin as Young Egg
- Jean Douchet as the bishop
- Julie-Anne Roth as the kitchen girl
- Nicolas Vaude as a Protestant

== Production ==
The film was an international co-production between by several companies based in France, Germany, and Italy, with the additional participation of StudioCanal and the American company Miramax and the support of Eurimages. Among the locations were the Mafra Palace in Portugal, the Saint-Quentin Basilica, Saint-Quentin, Aisne, and the Château de Maulnes, Cruzy-le-Châtel in France. The organ piece played during the wedding of Margaret of Valois and Henri de Bourbon was recorded by Pierre Pincemaille on the organ of the Basilica of Saint-Denis.

== Soundtrack ==
La reine Margot - Soundtrack

Soundtrack album by Goran Bregović
- Released: 1994
- Label: Philips
- Producer: Goran Bregović

The La Reine Margot soundtrack was composed by Sarajevo-born composer Goran Bregović. Like most of Bregović's work, the soundtrack's melodies are heavily influenced by the Balkan folk music tradition. Additionally, Bregović refurbished some of his previous work while as the frontman of Yugoslav rock band Bijelo dugme.

=== Track listing ===
1. "Elo Hi (Canto Nero)" (feat. Ofra Haza) - based on Kada odem, kad me ne bude (chorus) by Bijelo Dugme
2. "Rondinella" (feat. Zdravko Čolić)
3. "La Nuit De La Saint Barthélémy" (feat. Zdravko Čolić)
4. "Le Matin" (feat. Vasilisa)
5. "Lullaby"
6. "Ruda Neruda" (feat. Zdravko Čolić)
7. "U te sam se zaljubija"
8. "La Chasse"
9. "Margot"
10. "Rencontre"
11. "Marguerite De Valois Et Henri De Navarre"
12. "Le Mariage"
13. "La Nuit" (feat. Dusan Prelevic) - based on Ružica by Bijelo Dugme
14. "Elo Hi" (feat. Ofra Haza)

== Costumes ==
The costumes for the film were designed by Moidele Bickel, who was inspired by Italian fashion of the 1560s as well as early 17th-century Spanish fashion, particularly for the collars. The costumes deliberately do not include ruffles, which were fashionable in 1572. The accessories contain antiquated jewelry fashionable in the 1990s worn by the queen at her wedding. According to clothing historian Isabelle Paresys, who attended the University of Lille, the costumes designed for the film compromise between historical documentation and the fashion of the period in which the film is set.

With regard to hairstyles, the king and his brothers wear their hair long, which owes more to the fashion of the time and stars such as Kurt Cobain (who died the same year) than to historical reality. Paresys analyzes these historical compromises as a way of limiting the strangeness between what the audience will easily recognize as familiar landmarks while keeping the integrity of the films' era through time specific pieces.

== Release ==
The film opened on 13 May 1994 at the 1994 Cannes Film Festival and also opened nationally in France the same day. The version shown at Cannes and for the French theatrical run had a runtime of 162 minutes.

For the film’s North American release, the film's American distributor Miramax chose to market the film as a traditional costume drama, with an emphasis on the romance between Margot and La Môle. Fifteen minutes were cut from Chéreau’s version and a deleted scene of Margot and La Môle wrapped in a red cloak was reinserted. This version was shown in cinemas outside France and later on video. Miramax also changed the image on the poster; the American one features the red cloak scene of the pair of lovers, in contrast to the French poster which shows a shocked Margot in a white dress bespattered with blood. The film grossed over $1.29 million in the U.S. in 1994.

The original full-length version was available for a limited period in the United Kingdom on VHS in a collectors' edition box set in 1995, but all further releases until the blu-ray rerelease in 2014 used the shorter 145-minute cut. The Region 2 European DVD cover also uses the original poster.

== Box office ==
The film grossed 12.7 million French Francs ($2.2 million) in its first five days in France. The following week it was the number one film in France after expanding from 248 to 428 screens. The film had a total of 2,002,915 admissions in France, for a gross of $12.26 million. In Italy, the film grossed over $2 million. In the United States and Canada, the film grossed $2,017,346 in a limited theatrical release. It had admissions of 260,000 in Germany with a gross of $1.33 million and 530,800 admissions in Argentina. It was the highest-grossing non-English language film in the UK during 1995 with a gross of £635,711 ($980,000). In Australia it grossed $890,000. Worldwide, it has grossed over $20 million.

=== Year-end lists ===
- Top 10 (listed alphabetically, not ranked) – Mike Clark, USA Today

== Accolades ==
List of Accolades
Award	Date of ceremony	Category	Recipient(s)	Result
Academy Awards	March 27, 1995	Best Costume Design	Moidele Bickel	Nominated
British Academy Film Awards	23 April 1996	Best Film Not in the English Language	Patrice Cheréau, Pierre Grunstein	Nominated
Cannes Film Festival	23 May 1994	Palme d'Or	Patrice Cheréau	Nominated
Cannes Film Festival	23 May 1994	Jury Prize	Patrice Cheréau	Won
Cannes Film Festival	23 May 1994	Best Actress	Virna Lisi	Won
César Awards	25 February 1995	Best Film	Patrice Chéreau	Nominated
César Awards	25 February 1995	Best Director	Patrice Chéreau	Nominated
César Awards	25 February 1995	Best Actress	Isabelle Adjani	Won
César Awards	25 February 1995	Best Supporting Actor	Jean-Hugues Anglade	Won
César Awards	25 February 1995	Best Actress in a Supporting Role	Dominique Blanc	Nominated
César Awards	25 February 1995	Best Actress in a Supporting Role	Virna Lisi	Won
César Awards	25 February 1995	Best Original Screenplay or Adaptation	Patrice Chéreau, Danièle Thompson	Nominated
César Awards	25 February 1995	Best Cinematography	Philippe Rousselot	Won
César Awards	25 February 1995	Best Costume Design	Moidele Bickel	Won
César Awards	25 February 1995	Best Editing	François Gédigier, Hélène Viard	Nominated
César Awards	25 February 1995	Best Music	Goran Bregovic	Nominated
César Awards	25 February 1995	Best Production Design	Richard Peduzzi, Olivier Radot	Nominated
David di Donatello Awards	3 June 1995	Best Supporting Actress	Virna Lisi	Nominated
David di Donatello Awards	3 June 1995	Best Costumes	Moidele Bickel	Nominated
Golden Globe Awards	January 21, 1995	Best Foreign Language Film	France	Nominated
Nastro d'Argento Awards	17 March 1995	Best Supporting Actress	Virna Lisi	Won
National Board of Review Awards	February 27, 1995	Top Five Foreign Language Films	Patrice Chéreau	Won

== Re-release and reception ==
For the film's 20th anniversary, Pathé restored Patrice Chéreau’s original 162-minute cut to 4k definition, and this version was given a limited theatrical release by the Cohen Media Group in 2014. This version received more critical praise than the 1994 Miramax cut, which critics said was confusing and did not give enough time for American audiences to digest various characters and plot lines.

On the review aggregator website Rotten Tomatoes, 82% of 34 critics' reviews are positive, with an average rating of 6.3/10. Peter Sobczynski, writing for RogerEbert.com, said the film is a "go-for-broke, blood-and-thunder saga that is as powerful and provocative today as it was when it was first released—even more so now that it has been returned to its full length", and the fact that it is one of the most expensive French films ever made shows onscreen. Scott Tobias of The Dissolve praised Isabelle Adjani for portraying Margot "as a figure of prismatic emotional and moral complexity, at times aggressive and seemingly reckless in pursuing her romantic and sexual interests, and at others cunning and shrewd in playing the middle of two sides locked in conflict." He noted her "uninhibited performance figures into Chéreau’s approach to history, which couldn’t be further from the decorous reserve and pageantry of other such costume epics." Sobczynski also commended the film for putting its female characters at the forefront of the plot. J. Hoberman of The New York Times wrote Virna Lisi "gives a harrowing performance as the poisonous Queen Mother." Robert Abele of the Los Angeles Times wrote, "Chéreau’s and screenwriter Danièle Thompson’s lively adaptation of Alexandre Dumas’ novel remains a model of heaving, combustible history, in which period lavishness and performance energy aren’t mutually exclusive. Splendidly acted and tautly executed."

The restoration was released on Blu-ray on August 26, 2014, with a new commentary track by the New York Film Festival's director emeritus Richard Peña.

== See also ==
- St. Bartholomew's Day massacre
- French Wars of Religion
- La Reine Margot (1954 film), an earlier film adaption of the novel
