= Château d'Ancy-le-Franc =

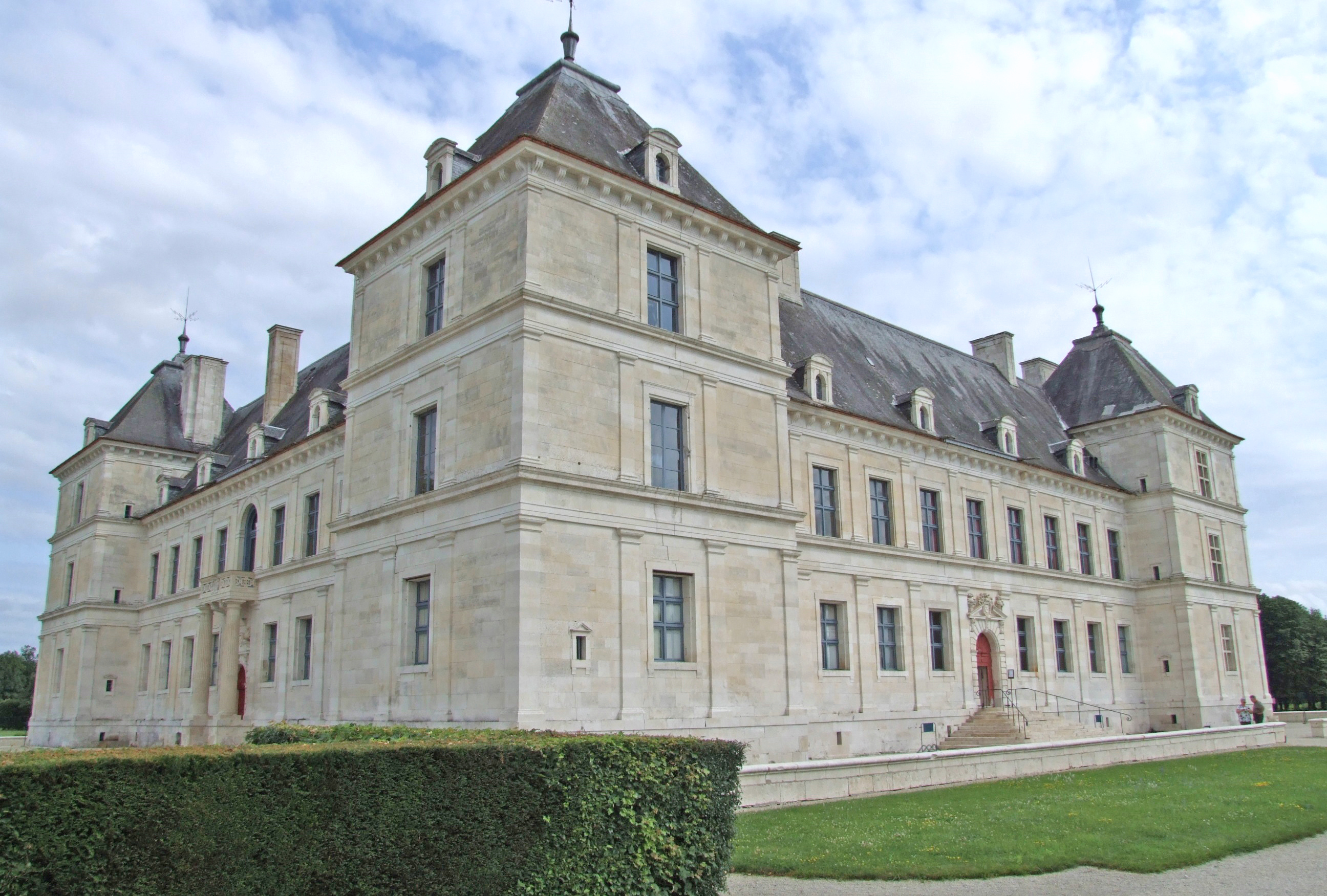
- Perspective view of the north pavilion of the Château d'Ancy-le-Franc with the entrance facade to the left

- Location of Château d'Ancy-le-Franc in France
- 47°46′27″N 4°09′42″E

History
- Built: 14th century
- Built for: Antoine III de Clermont
- Original use: Château

Site notes
- Architect: Sebastiano Serlio
- Architectural style: Renaissance
- Current use: Tourist attraction and historical research
- Owner: Paris Investir SAS (private)
- Website: http://www.chateau-ancy.com/en/

Monument historique
- Designated: 1983, 2003

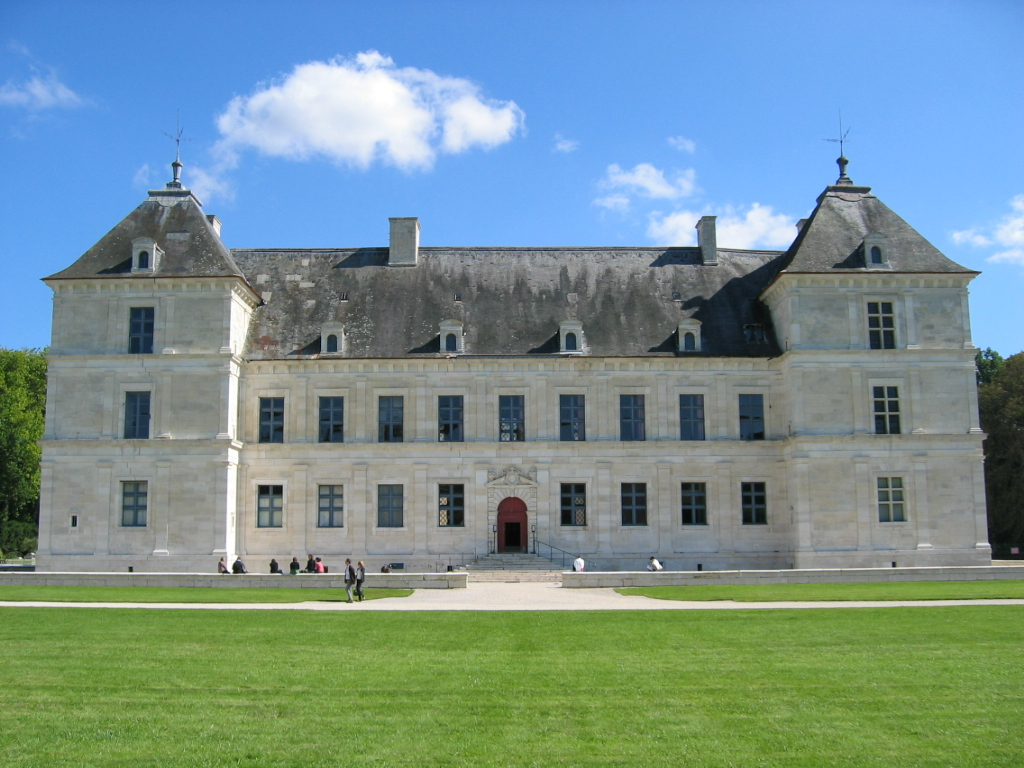
The Château of Ancy-le-Franc

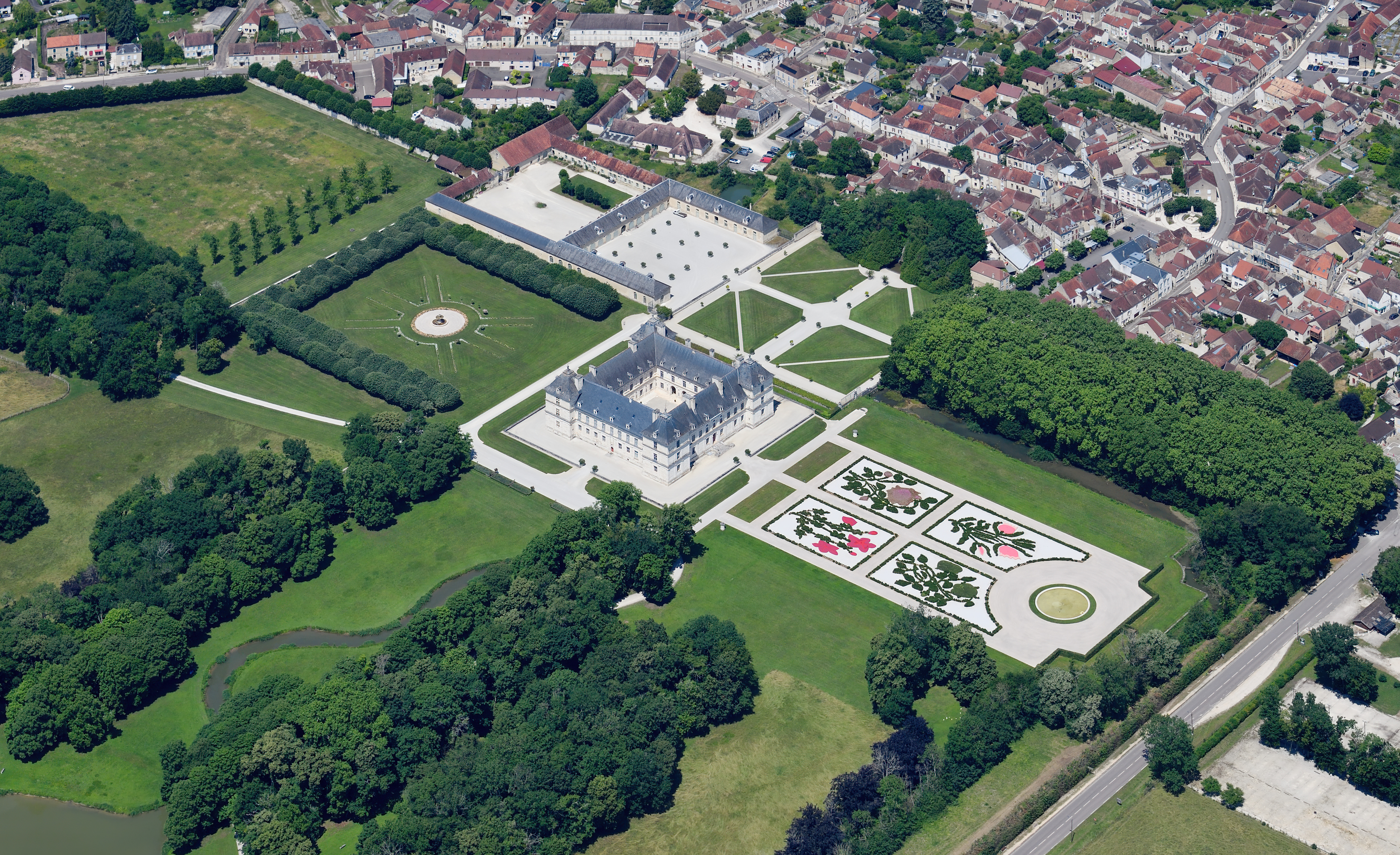
Aerial image of Château d'Ancy-le-Franc and its garden

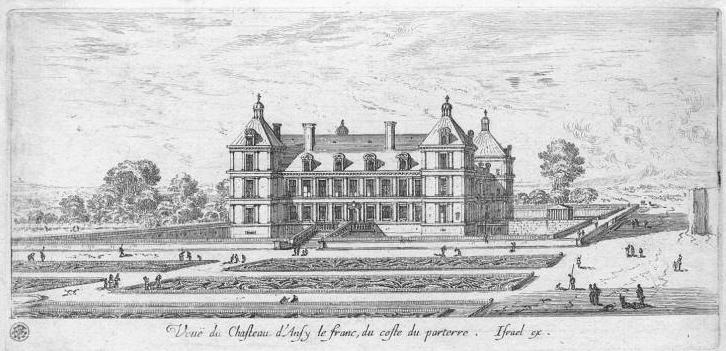
Ancy-le-Franc and its parterre, modified to a design en broderie in the 1630s: etching by Israel Silvestre, 1640s

Château d'Ancy-le-Franc is a Renaissance-style château of the 16th century located in the town of Ancy-le-Franc in the department of Yonne, in France.

== History ==
The site was originally occupied by a 12th-century fort, which survived until the end of the sixteenth century.

Construction of the existing château began in 1544, at the request of Antoine III de Clermont, brother-in-law of Diane de Poitiers and son of Anne de Husson, countess of Tonnerre. The design of the building is traditionally attributed to the Italian architect Sebastiano Serlio, who had been invited to France by King Francis I. Following Serlio's death in 1554 at Fontainebleau, architect Pierre Lescot, took over the work, respecting the original plans of Serlio. The interior design is the work of Francesco Primaticcio, who was working at Château de Fontainebleau at the time.

Antoine de Clermont died in 1578 and his grandson Charles-Henri de Clermont, completed the interior. Fully completed, the château was now able to host prestigious guests such as Henry III (brief visit), Henri IV in 1591, Louis XIII in 1631 and Louis XIV in 1674.

In 1683, the Clermont-Tonnerre family was forced to sell the land of Ancy-le-Franc and the château to François-Michel Le Tellier, minister of Louis XIV. The following year, Louvois acquired the entire County of Tonnerre, (including the Château de Maulnes). Following this, he employed well-known landscape architect André Le Nôtre for creating pathways and gardens within the grounds.

After the French Revolution, the family managed to regain possession of the château. He restored the grounds as well as the interior of the château to its former glory.

In 1844, Ancy-le-Franc was sold to Louis Aimé Gaspard de Clermont-Tonnerre, a descendant of Antoine III of Clermont. It then passed between various hands, including those of the princes of Merode.

The château is currently owned by a private company, Société Paris Investir SAS, which undertook its restoration, and recognition as a national historical monument.

== Description ==
The architecture of the château is the result of a mixture of French and Italian styles, a consequence of compromise between the French owner and Italian architect.

The château is built on a rectangular central plan. Four houses form a square and are each flanked by projecting pavilion walls. This plan is based on plans called "pi" widely used in France at that time. Serlio separated the two levels by a wide ledge upon which the second level bays. Tuscan columns were used on the main level and Doric columns were used on the second level. On both levels, the bays were framed by pilasters. While there are currently windows within each bay, this was not originally the case. Serlio wanted to create a rhythm alternating between open windows and empty bays. Additional windows filled all the empty bays in the 17th century.

For the facade of the interior, Serlio used Corinthian columns on the first level and Composite columns on the second level. Again, he created a rhythm alternating between open windows and niches framed by pilasters. These niches are adorned with an inner shell. Serlio created a triple arcade on the ground floor, reminiscent of the Villa Madama.

Serlio was able to comply with the weight requirements of the building and its steeply pitched roof in a manner similar to the Château de Villandry, using limestone from Burgundy.

Inside the château, there are murals from drawings of Primaticcio or Niccolò dell'Abbate, as well as coffered ceilings, fine wood carvings, and various colorful ornaments.
