= Ancy-le-Franc =

- Commune
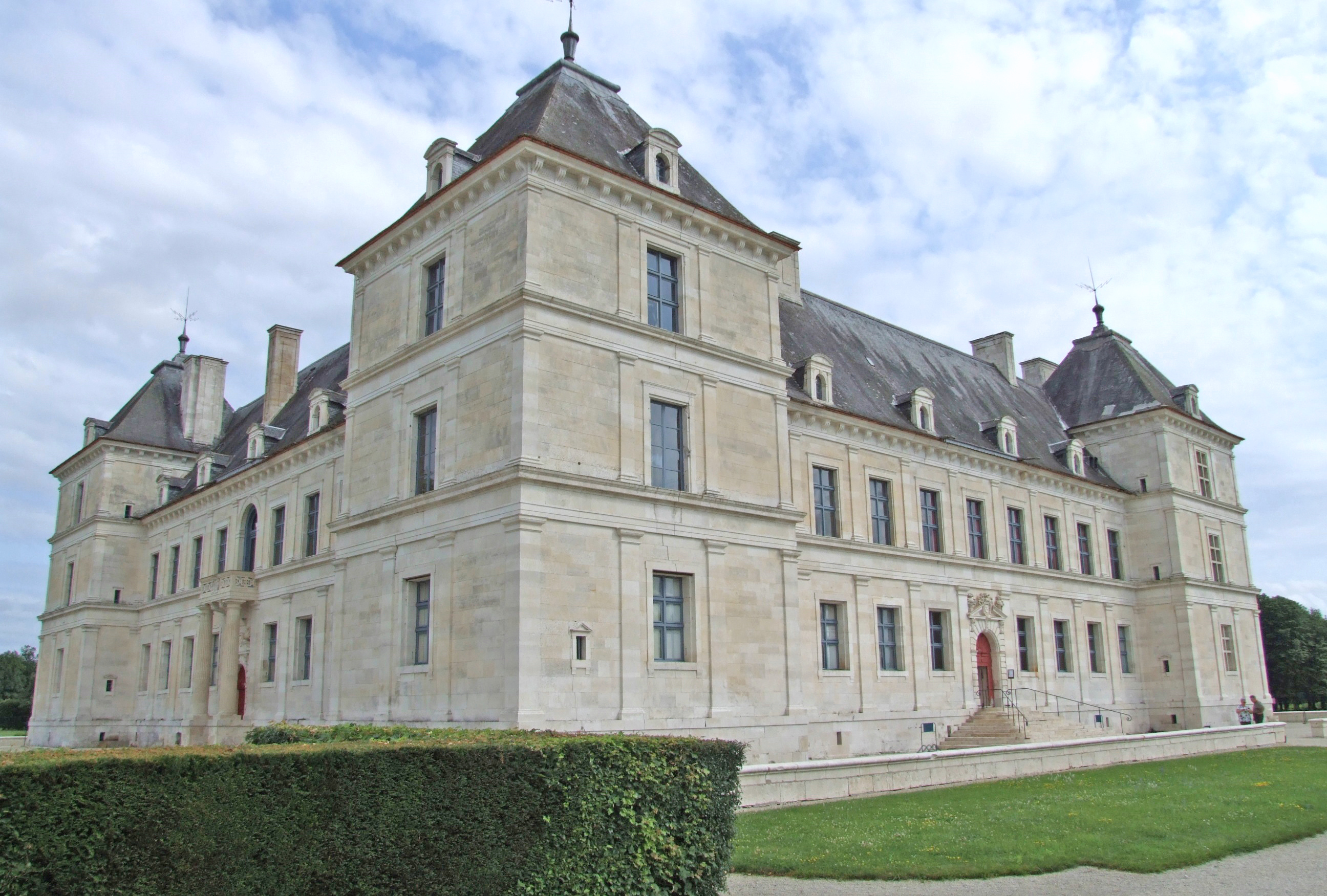
- Château d'Ancy-le-Franc

- Coat of arms
- Location of Ancy-le-Franc
- Location within France Location within Bourgogne-Franche-Comté
- Coordinates: 47°46′38″N 4°09′49″E
- Country: France
- Region: Bourgogne-Franche-Comté
- Department: Yonne
- Arrondissement: Avallon
- Canton: Tonnerrois
- Intercommunality: Le Tonnerrois en Bourgogne

Government
  - Mayor (2020–2026): Emmanuel Delagneau
- Area^{1}: 19.65 km^{2} (7.59 sq mi)
- Highest elevation: 302 m (991 ft)
- Lowest elevation: 169 m (554 ft)
- Population (2023): 834
  - Density: 42.4/km^{2} (110/sq mi)
- Time zone: UTC+01:00 (CET)
  - Summer (DST): UTC+02:00 (CEST)
- INSEE/Postal code: 89005 /89160
- ^{1} French Land Register data, which excludes lakes, ponds, glaciers > 1 km^{2} (0.386 sq mi or 247 acres) and river estuaries.

Ancy-le-Franc (French pronunciation: [ɑ̃si lə fʁɑ̃]) is a commune in the Yonne department in Bourgogne-Franche-Comté in north-central France.

== See also ==
- Château d'Ancy-le-Franc
- Communes of the Yonne department
