= Cruzy-le-Châtel =

- Commune
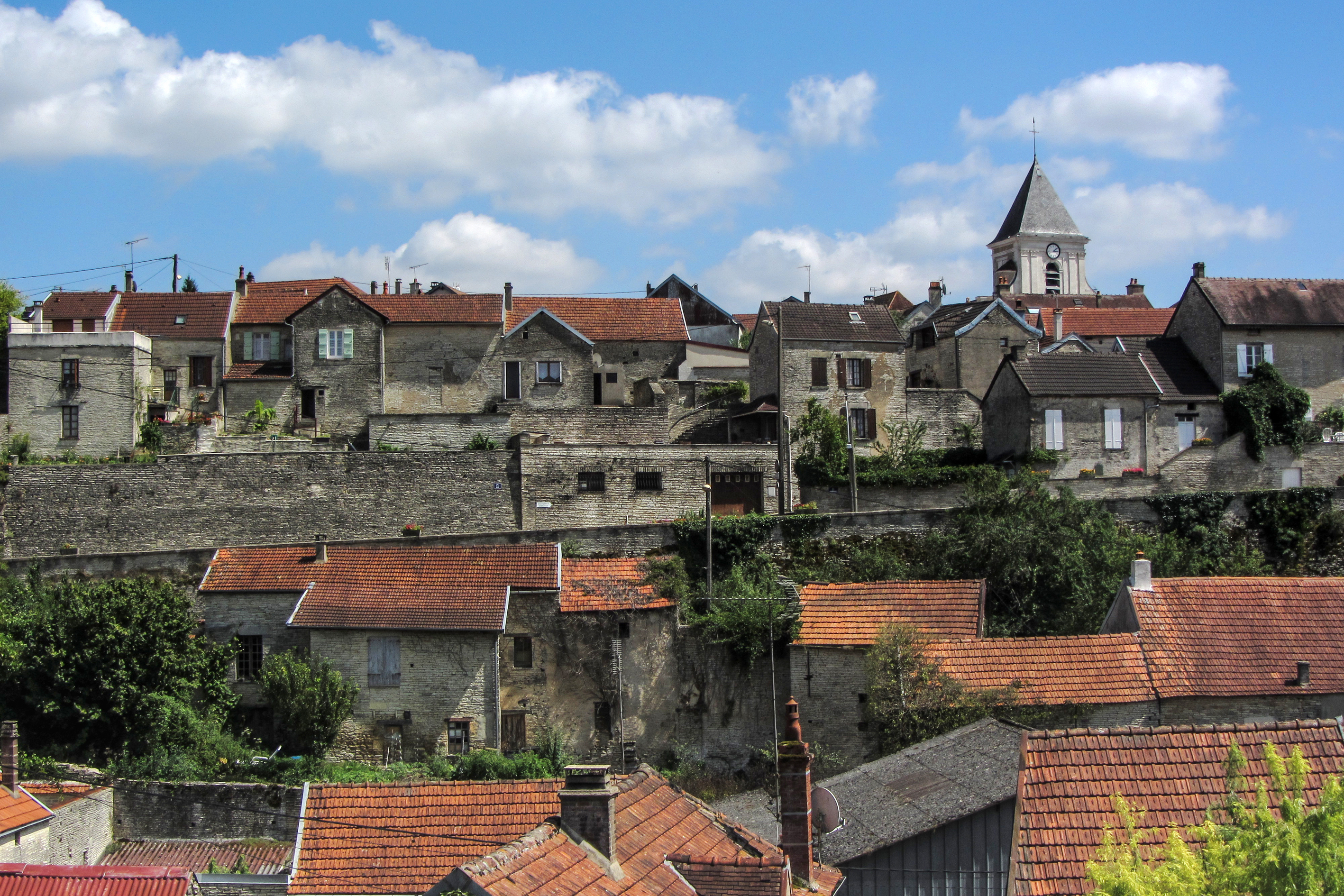
- A general view of Cruzy-le-Châtel

- Coat of arms
- Location of Cruzy-le-Châtel
- Location within France Location within Bourgogne-Franche-Comté
- Coordinates: 47°51′24″N 4°12′46″E
- Country: France
- Region: Bourgogne-Franche-Comté
- Department: Yonne
- Arrondissement: Avallon
- Canton: Tonnerrois

Government
  - Mayor (2020–2026): Thierry Durand
- Area^{1}: 59.52 km^{2} (22.98 sq mi)
- Highest elevation: 342 m (1,122 ft)
- Lowest elevation: 175 m (574 ft)
- Population (2023): 222
  - Density: 3.73/km^{2} (9.66/sq mi)
- Time zone: UTC+01:00 (CET)
  - Summer (DST): UTC+02:00 (CEST)
- INSEE/Postal code: 89131 /89740
- ^{1} French Land Register data, which excludes lakes, ponds, glaciers > 1 km^{2} (0.386 sq mi or 247 acres) and river estuaries.

Cruzy-le-Châtel (French pronunciation: [kʁyzi lə ʃɑtɛl]) is a commune in the Yonne department in Bourgogne-Franche-Comté in north-central France.

== Historical buildings ==
- Château de Maulnes a 16th-century château, classified as a historic monument in 1942. It was opened to the public in 2005 and its restoration work is ongoing.
- Église Saint-Barthélémy de Cruzy-le-Châtel an 18th-century Catholic church, classified as a historic building in 1998.

== See also ==
- Communes of the Yonne department
