= Thury, Yonne =

Thury
- Commune
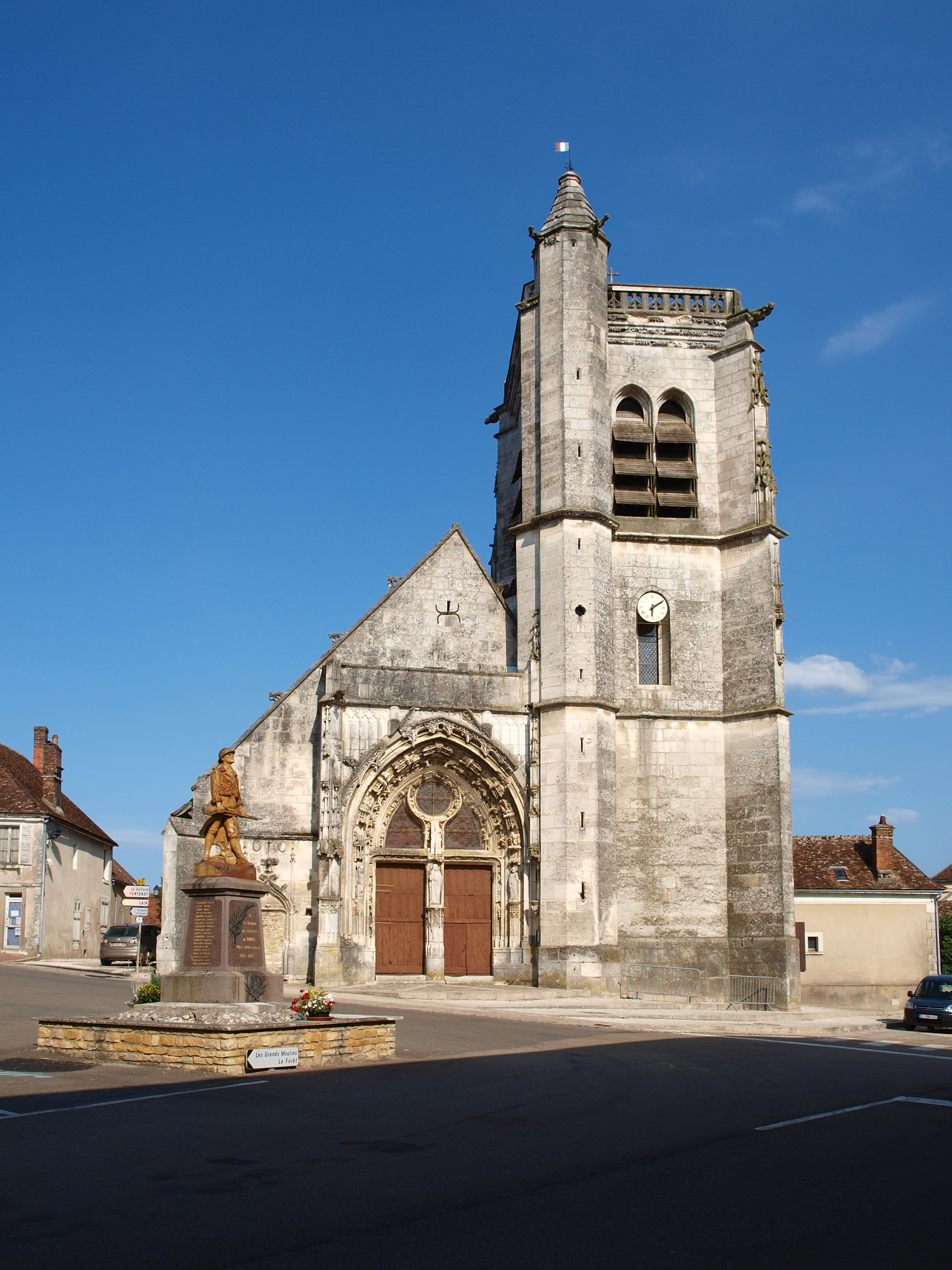
- Church and WWI monument

- Coat of arms
- Location of Thury
- Location within France Location within Bourgogne-Franche-Comté
- Coordinates: 47°35′14″N 3°17′43″E
- Country: France
- Region: Bourgogne-Franche-Comté
- Department: Yonne
- Arrondissement: Auxerre
- Canton: Vincelles

Government
  - Mayor (2020–2026): Claude Conte
- Area^{1}: 23.22 km^{2} (8.97 sq mi)
- Elevation: 282 m (925 ft)
- Highest elevation: 328 m (1,076 ft)
- Lowest elevation: 222 m (728 ft)
- Population (2023): 418
  - Density: 18.0/km^{2} (46.6/sq mi)
- Time zone: UTC+01:00 (CET)
  - Summer (DST): UTC+02:00 (CEST)
- INSEE/Postal code: 89416 /89520
- ^{1} French Land Register data, which excludes lakes, ponds, glaciers > 1 km^{2} (0.386 sq mi or 247 acres) and river estuaries.

Thury (French pronunciation: [tyʁi]) is a commune in the Yonne department in Bourgogne-Franche-Comté in north-central France, in the natural region of Forterre. Its inhabitants are called Thurycois and Thurycoises.

== Name ==
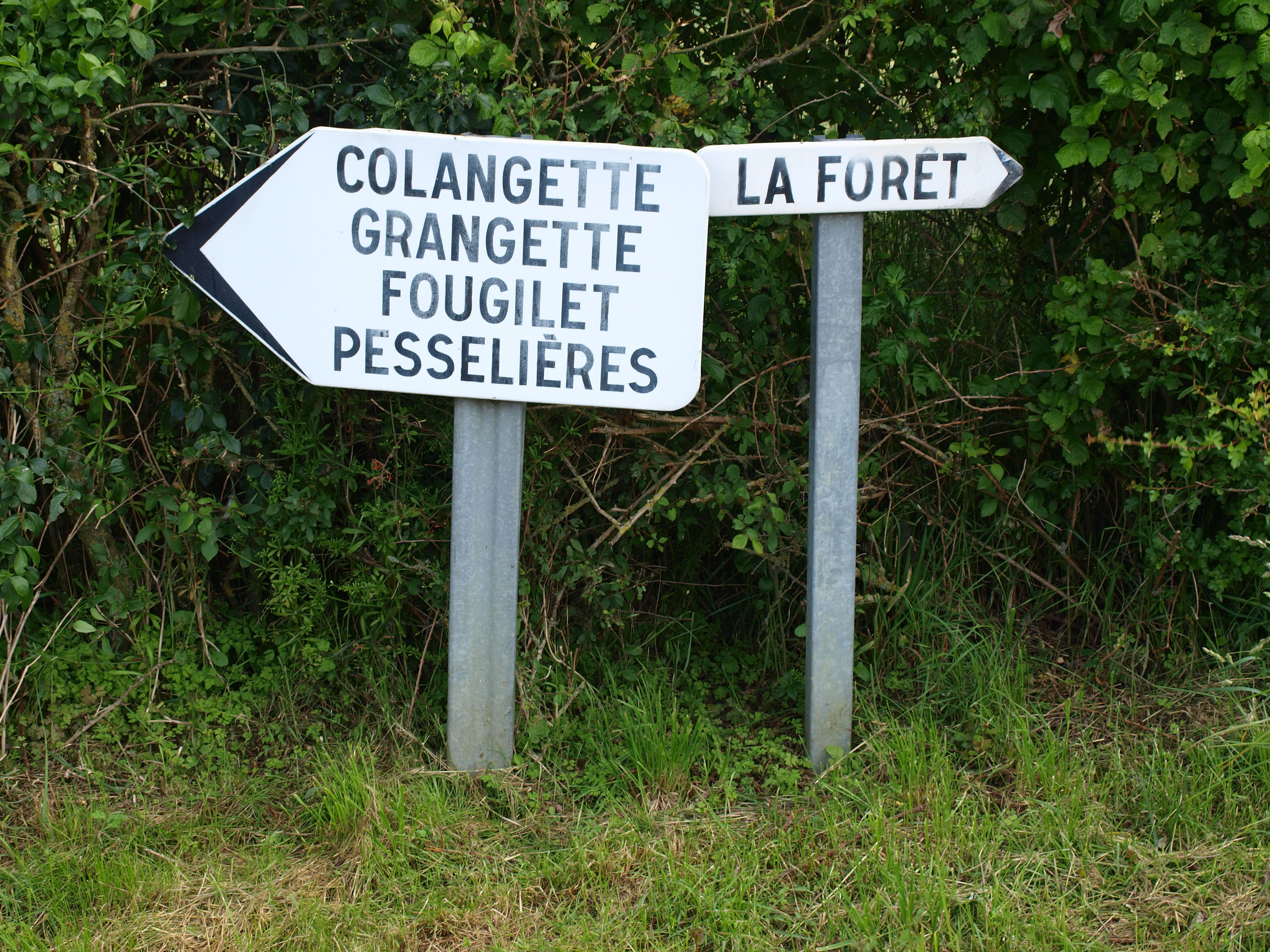
Hamlets around Thury. (Fougilet and Pesselières are hamlets of nearby Sougères)

Thury's is attested as Tauriacus in the high medieval Gesta of the Bishops of Auxerre (see below); Thuraco in 1369 (Pouillé); Thoriaco of the fourteenth century (Pouillé). Tauriacus originally referred to a field or property of one Taurus, possibly Taruos in Gaulish. The Gallo-Roman suffix -acus or -acum is of Gaulish origin and indicates a person's property. This suffix (fr) often evolved into -y in many French place names, in Thury's region and far beyond. An alternative etymology would be from the appellative turra, of pre-Latin and possibly Gaulish origin and the root of many toponyms.

Thury's hamlets (hameaux) include Colangette, Gémigny, Grangette, La Forêt, Le Boichet, Les Grands Moulins, Moulery, and Panny.

== Geography and geology ==
The altitude of the village of Thury is 225m. The higher localities on Thury's territory are: Les Grands Moulins, at 327.5m; La Justice, at 327m; Le Moulin Buteau, at 325m; Le Roichat, at 303.6m; Le Bois de Mont, at 301.2m; and Marchat, at 292m.

Beyond Thury's boundaries, the highest points in the surroundings are at Taingy, 338m; Perreuse, 373m; and the old mill of the Montagne des Alouettes on the territory of Sougères, 366.8m. A local belief that the latter's name is derived from the Roman Legio V Alaudae is no longer held true, and the name appears to stem from the locale's feudal history.

Chalk quarries near the settlement of Bois de Thury were exploited from 1850 to 1940.

== History ==
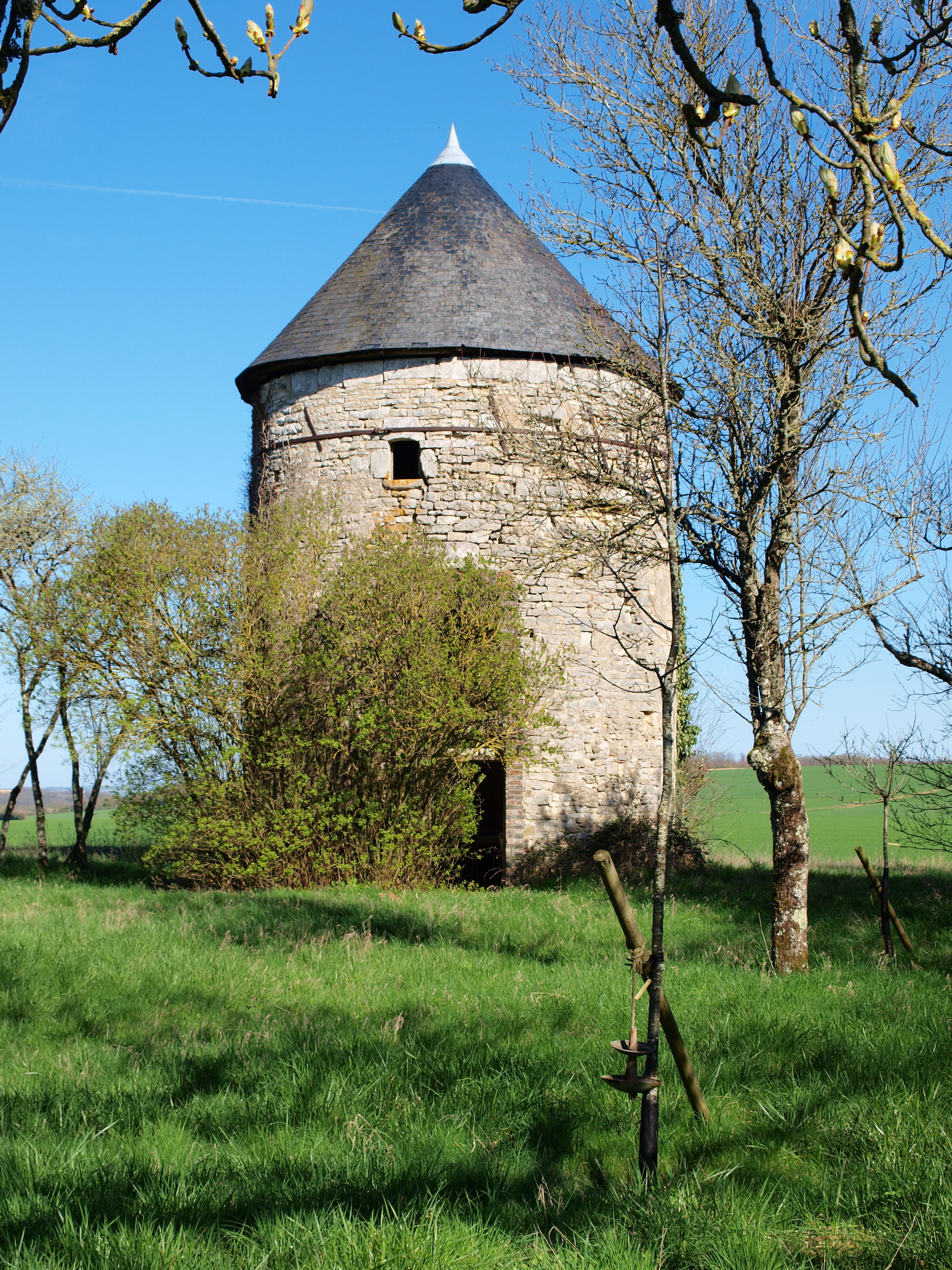
Former windmill, Le Boichet

Prehistoric traces of human presence in Thury, determined by finds of flint remains, go back to the Neanderthals about 40,000 years BCE. Neolithic objects (ca. 6000–3000 BCE in the region) discovered by Mr Creusard, including a polished stone pestle that was used to crush grain, are held in the small museum inside the church's tower. Burgundian palaeographer Maximilien Quantin reported the finding in 1862 of bronze objects (a ring, a hatchet and a key) from the Bronze Age (ca. 3000–1000 BCE) in Thury's hamlet of Gémigny.

=== Thury before the Hundred Years' War ===
The Roman road from Auxerre to Entrains-sur-Nohain forms part of the boundary between the respective territories of Sougères-en-Puisaye and Thury.

Local tradition holds that the parish was created in 432 CE by Germanus of Auxerre. At any rate, Thury appears to have been a significant parish of the Auxerrois region during the early Middle Ages: it is cited several times in a manuscript started in the late 9th century, the Gesta episcoporum autissiodorensium, as a station in the respective itineraries of Bishops Aunarius (Saint Aunaire, late 6th century), Tetricius (Saint Tétry, late 7th century), and Gerrannus (Saint Géran, early 10th century).

The land of Thury was part of the battlefield of the Battle of Fontenoy (841). Echoes of the battle survive in toponyms around the village to this day. For example, the name of the nearby hill and wood of Roichat refers to King Charles the Bald (le roi Charles), who had established his temporary base camp there.

After 1000 CE, lordship over the land of Thury alternated between the County of Auxerre, its Bishop (long a territorial lord as well), the Count of Champagne, the Count of Nevers, and occasionally the Duke of Burgundy. There is no trace of a specific lordship of Thury during that period though, and it is not clear how significant the village was if indeed it remained inhabited.

=== Late Middle Ages and Early Modern Era ===
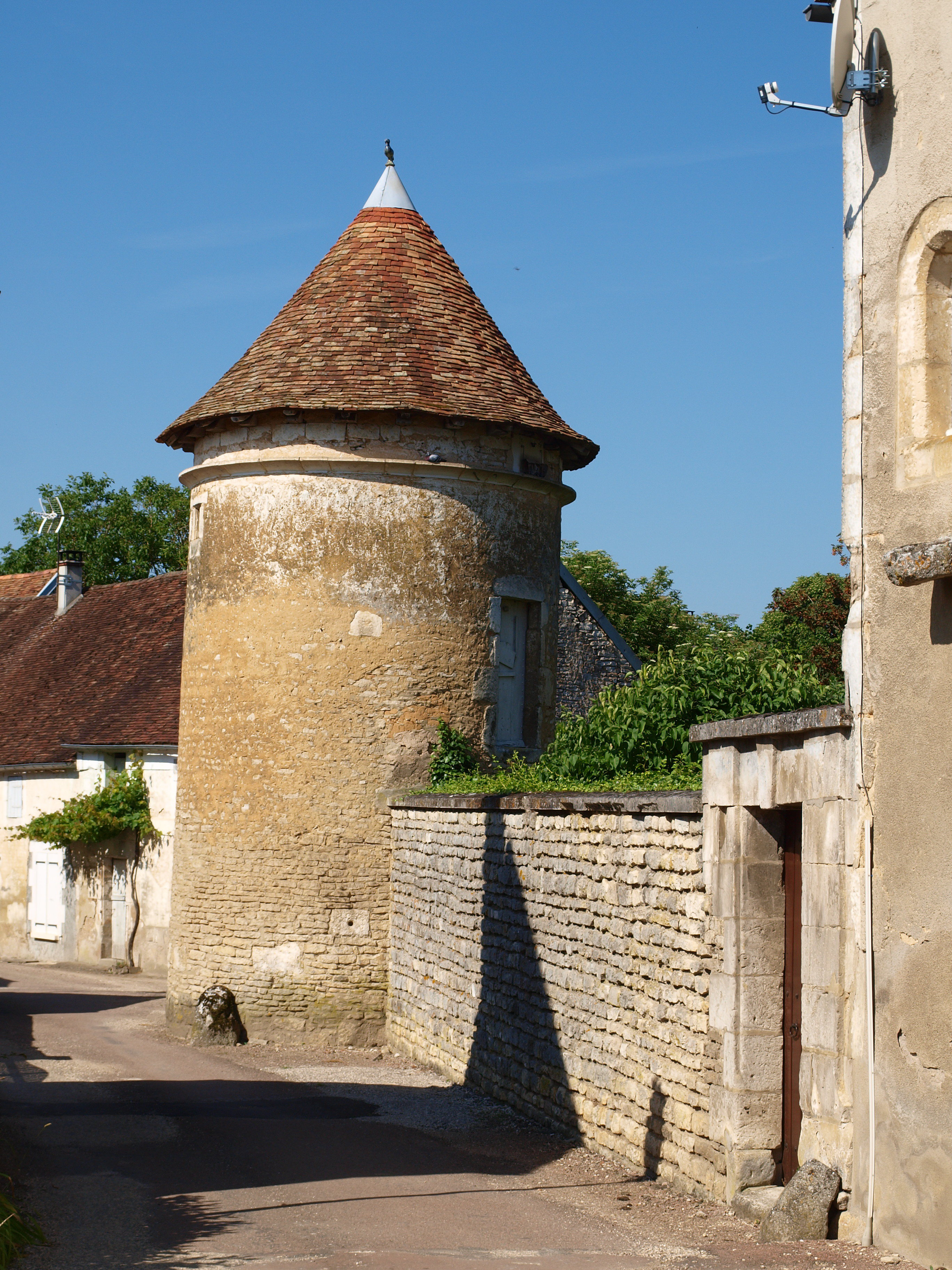
Dovecote of Thury's village castle

In any event, Thury and the surrounding region suffered greatly during the Crisis of the Late Middle Ages, including the Hundred Years' War. It was ravaged by roaming armies, especially in 1411 during an episode of the Armagnac–Burgundian Civil War and in 1423 in the run-up to the Battle of Cravant. Security did not return until well after the Peace of Arras in 1435. Thury had only eight registered landholders (tenanciers) in 1476, growing rapidly to 28 censitaires in 1481 and 60 in 1497.

Thury's repopulation in the late 15th century was largely by newcomers (known as horsains, "foreigners") from other parts of the Kingdom of France. The village castle was built around that time. The church was also rebuilt then and completed in 1503, with the portal sculpted in 1521. In 1542, Francis I granted Thury by letters patent the right to hold a weekly market and three fairs a year (and also to erect fortifications around the village), which was reaffirmed by Henry III in 1576 and Louis XIV in 1669.

The region suffered from renewed insecurity during the French Wars of Religion, as it was on the way of the armies of John Casimir of the Palatinate-Simmern in 1576, of Count Fabian of Dohna in 1587, and of François de La Grange d'Arquian in 1617 during the aristocratic uprising against Concino Concini.

The hamlets of Grangette and Colangette, despite being geographically very close to Thury, where under separate jurisdiction as lands of the Abbey of Saint-Germain d'Auxerre and were only reunited with the rest of the village in 1710.

In 1764, a fire ravaged much of Thury, even though the village castle and church were spared.

==== Lordship of Thury after the Hundred Years' War ====
Thury, in its severely depopulated state, may have been part of the lordship of Puisaye at the time it was appropriated by Antoine de Chabannes from the disgraced Jacques Coeur in the early 1450s. Upon his death in 1488, Antoine was succeeded as lord of Puisaye by his son Jean de Chabannes (1462–1503), whose coat of arms was sculpted (and is still extant) at the top of the tower of the church of Thury. As Jean had no surviving son, the lordship of Puisaye was inherited by his daughter Antoinette de Chabannes (1498–1529) and went as dowry to the family of Anjou-Mézières in 1515 when she married René d'Anjou (1483-ca. 1521). Their son Nicolas d'Anjou (1518-ca. 1569) sold Thury to Gaspard de Champs (?–1536), lord of nearby Pesselières, thus separating it from the other lands of Puisaye.

After that, Thury was mostly transmitted through the female line, as was often the case in the early modern period. It thus went to:

- Marie de Champs (ca. 1528-?), daughter of Gaspard and Françoise de Corquilleroy, and Guillaume de Grossouvre (?–1584), married in 1537;
- Marie de Grossouvre, daughter of Guillaume and Marie, and Jean de Meung la Ferté, married in 1583;
- Madeleine de Meung la Ferté, daughter of Jean and Marie, and Pierre de Loynes, married around 1602;
- Anne de Loynes (1603–1687), daughter of Pierre and Madeleine, and Jean de Richoufftz (1599–1655), a scion of the House of Richoufftz de Manin, married in 1631.

The lordship of Thury fragmented in the mid-17th century and was eventually acquired in 1667–1668 by Louis du Deffand (1624–?), a high-ranking military officer, Marquess of Lalande and lord of Sementron, Fontenoy, Saints, Lain, and other locales. (Le Deffand is a hamlet of Saints.) His son Jean-Baptiste du Deffand (1648–1728) completed the territorial consolidation in 1710 with the acquisition of Grangette, Colangette and Banny. Of his five children, one (Jean-Baptiste Jacques) was the husband of Madame du Deffand; another, Jeanne Antoinette Louise, in 1716 married Joseph François de Castellane de Lauris des Gérards de Vassadel who thus acquired the lordship of Thury. Their son Louis Joseph Marie André Gabriel de Castellane, born in 1738, was the last lord of Thury.

=== Since 1800 ===
As part of the Waterloo campaign, Thury was occupied by Austrian Hussars from 29 July to 5 August 1815, and then briefly by the Bavarian Army.

In 1840, the municipal council under mayor Edme Rouger decided to relocate the cemetery from the village square to its current location in the outskirts. The new cemetery enclosure was completed in 1844. The town hall was built between 1844 and 1861.

There was unrest in Thury following the 1851 French coup d'état, as in neighboring places in Nivernais and Puisaye. The leaders of the uprising against the coup were pardoned in 1852.

World War I took a heavy toll like in most French villages. 38 local casualties are listed on Thury's war monument.

Electrification was conducted in the 1920s, and running water was installed in the late 1930s with the construction of four reservoirs around Thury.

Thury was again occupied by German invaders in June 1940 during World War II. Because it had been equipped with running water ahead of the surrounding villages, a German company camped there, in the park of the Angilbert property. The Kommandantur was established in the former post office. An Avro Lancaster Allied bomber on its way to targets in Germany was downed by a Focke-Wulf fighter aircraft above Taingy in the night of 25–26 July 1944, leaving no survivors. Another British plane was downed above the hamlet of Colangette.

The main organised resistance in Thury's surroundings was the Maquis 3, which started in March–April 1944 in a wood north of Saint-Sauveur. This maquis then had to move east and was established near Thury on the Montagne des Alouettes in late July 1944. About 250-strong, the group had weapons parachuted by Allied planes. The village was liberated in August 1944.

Sewage was completed between 1959 and 1962.

Thury had a resident doctor during most of the 19th and 20th centuries. The last village doctor retired in 2011.

== Local government ==
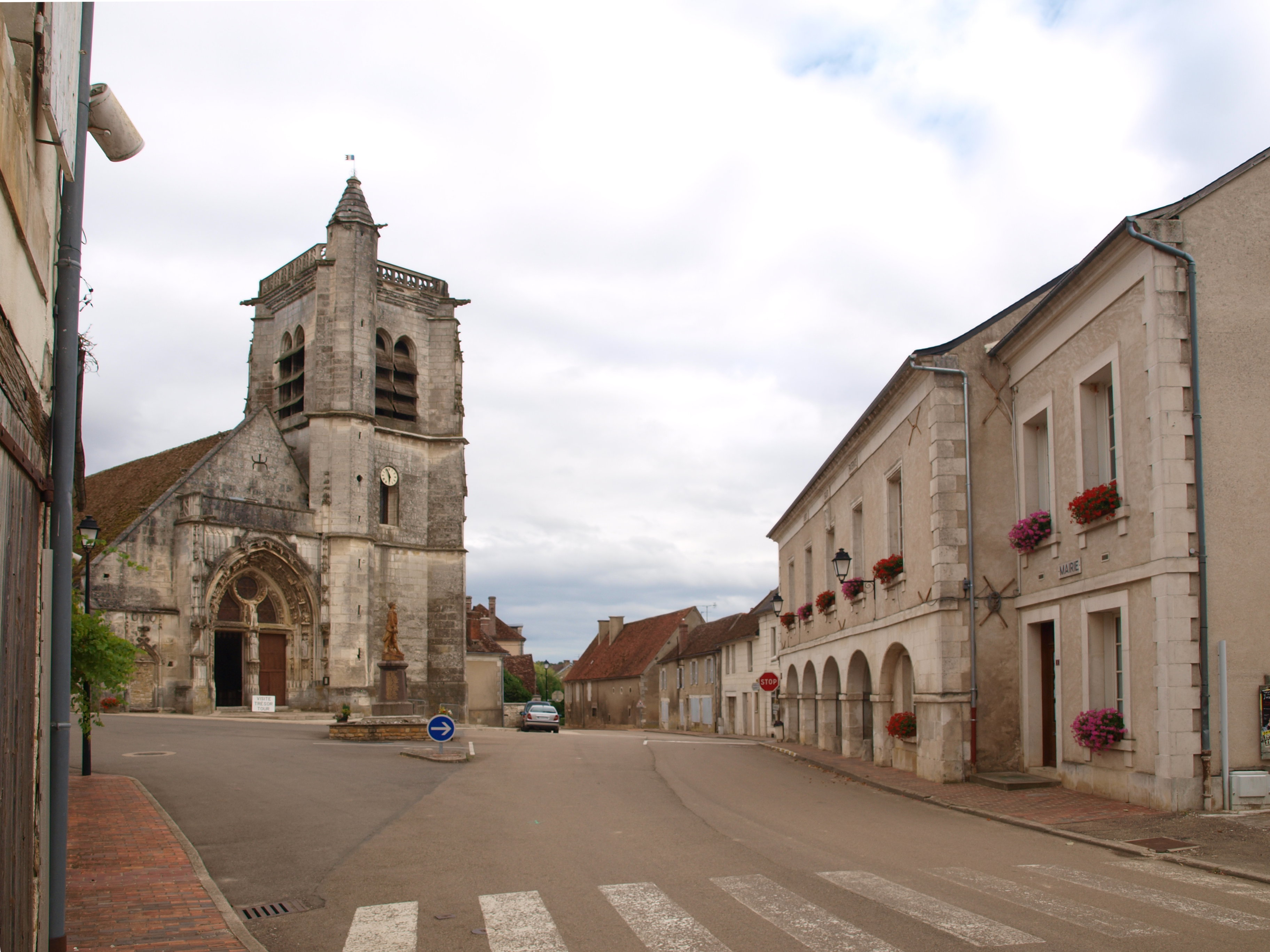
Town hall (right) and church

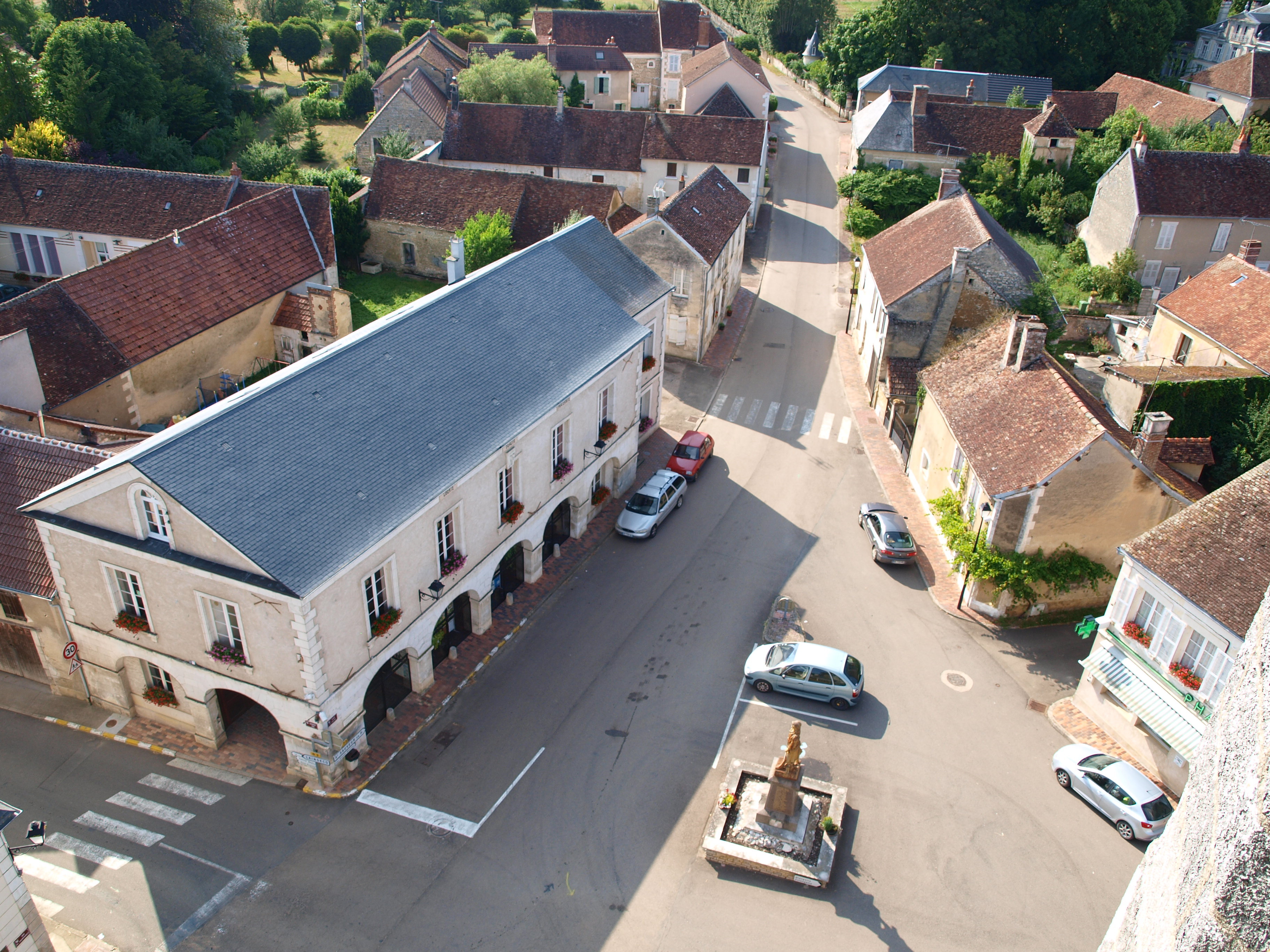
Town hall viewed from the church tower

The municipality of Thury was created in 1793. It has always been part of the département of Yonne. Initially it was the seat (chef-lieu) of its own canton, part of the arrondissement of Saint-Fargeau. In 1801, Thury became part of the canton of Saint-Sauveur-en-Puisaye and the arrondissement of Auxerre. Following a remodeling of the cantons, Thury has been part of the Canton of Vincelles since 2015.

Thury was part of the Pays de Puisaye-Forterre, created as one of the new pays under the Loi du 4 février 1995 d'orientation pour l'aménagement et le développement du territoire. This pays was dissolved on 31 December 2016 and replaced on 1 January 2017 by the Communauté de communes de Puisaye-Forterre, with seat in Saint-Fargeau.

=== List of mayors of Thury ===
- ca.1793–1800: Joseph Jean Baptiste Desleau
- 1800–1807: Louis Fron (1752–1813)
- 1808–1814: Lazare Guillier (1765–1848)
- 1815–1848: Edme-Alexandre Rouger (1782–1848)
- 1848–1872: Jean-Baptiste-Alexandre Pascault (1800–1872)
- 1872–1894: Laurent Eugène Gonneau (1823–1895)
- 1894–1913: Casimir Félix Angilbert (1846–1931)
- 1913–1919: Jules Boutron (1851–?)
- 1919–1925: René Delestre (1864–1931)
- 1925–1947: Gustave Boisseau (1868–1954)
- 1947–1983: Robert Barba (1913–2003)
- 1983–1989: Jack Allard (?–2018)
- 1989–2014: André Grossier (born 1947)
- since 2014: Claude Conte (born 1951)

== Economy ==
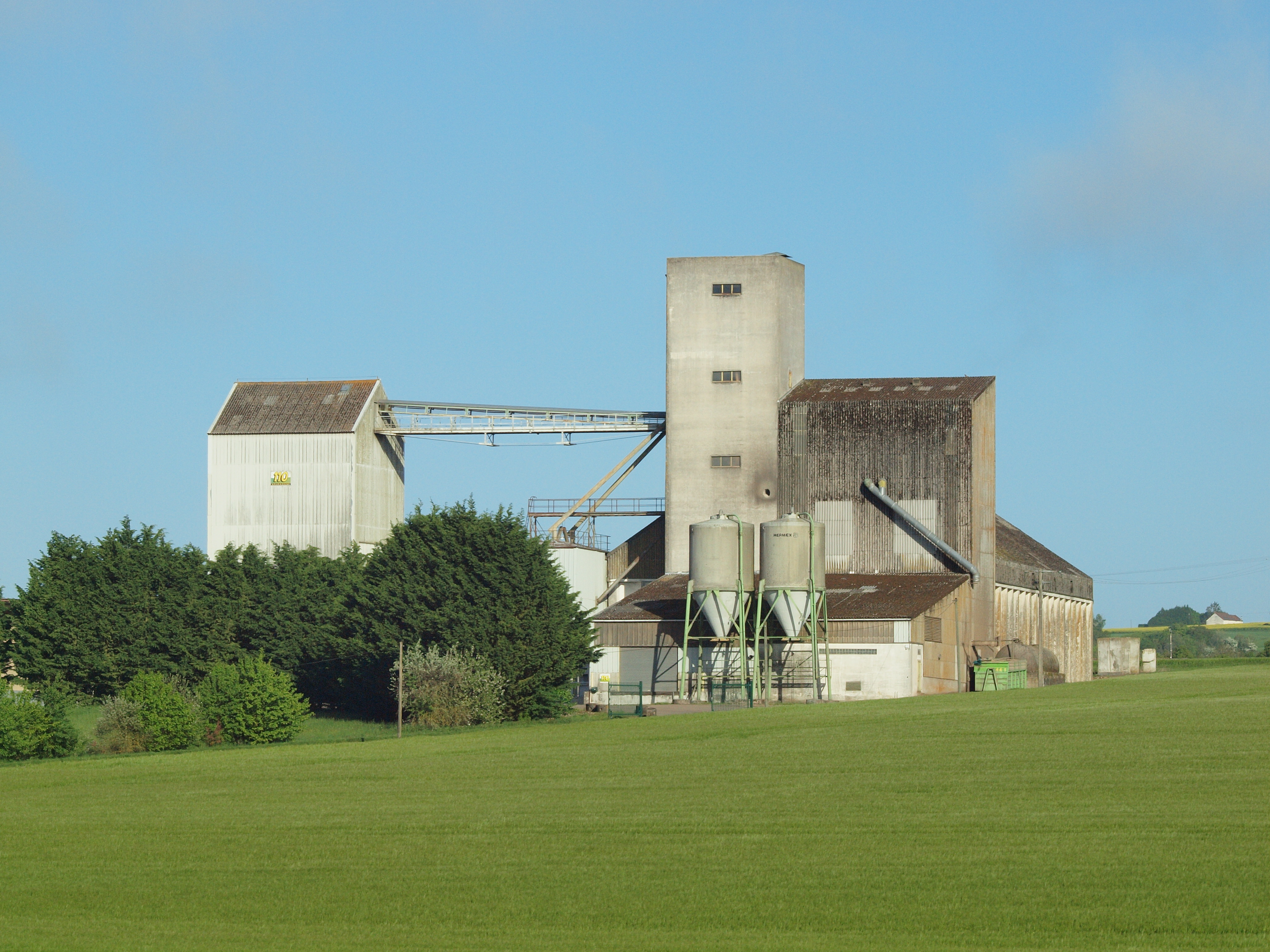
Thury's grain elevator

The local economy is predominantly agricultural. Thury also has several shops and services (grocery, bakery, hairdresser, pharmacy, post office) and several companies established on its territory (electricity, roofing, sanitation, masonry, earthwork & public Works, maintenance of green spaces, industrial computing, pet grooming) as well as guest houses in the village and its hamlets of Grangette and Moulery. Thury retains a primary school.

== Heritage ==
=== Church of Saint-Julien ===
Thury's church is dedicated to Julian of Brioude. In the Middle Ages, it had been affiliated with Saint-Laurent-lès-Cosne Abbey. The arrangement was specifically confirmed by a papal bull of Eugene III in 1147, and was still in place by the late 15th century, when the church was rebuilt.

The original contract for the sculpture of the front portal is preserved in the Departmental Archives of Yonne in Auxerre. It was signed on 9 July 1521 between mason Antoine Cas and "ymageur" (sculptor) François Faulconnier at Auxerre. The wooden doors are from the 17th century and were restored in 1751. Three statues of St Peter, St Paul and Jesus Christ, by Parisian sculptor Jean-Georges Poutriquet, were added in 1975.

The relics of Saint Caradoc, known locally as Caradeuc or Caradeu, are attested since the early 17th century. They were locally believed to have been preserved in 1587 by inhabitants of Thury from the sacking of the church of Donzy, where they had been held since 1180; however, the veracity of this tradition has been questioned. Relics of the church patron Julian of Brioude were donated from Auxerre and Brioude in 1896.

The church's stained glass windows were created in the second half of the 19th century, some by Auguste Charlemagne of Toulouse in 1870 and others in the 1880s.

The church was designated a Monument historique by order (décret) of 4 August 1970. It is representative of the late Gothic architecture of the region.

A small museum was opened in 2005 inside the church's tower. A major renovation of the church's tile roofing was conducted in 2015–2016.

The nearby clergy house (presbytère) was rebuilt several times, last in 1843.

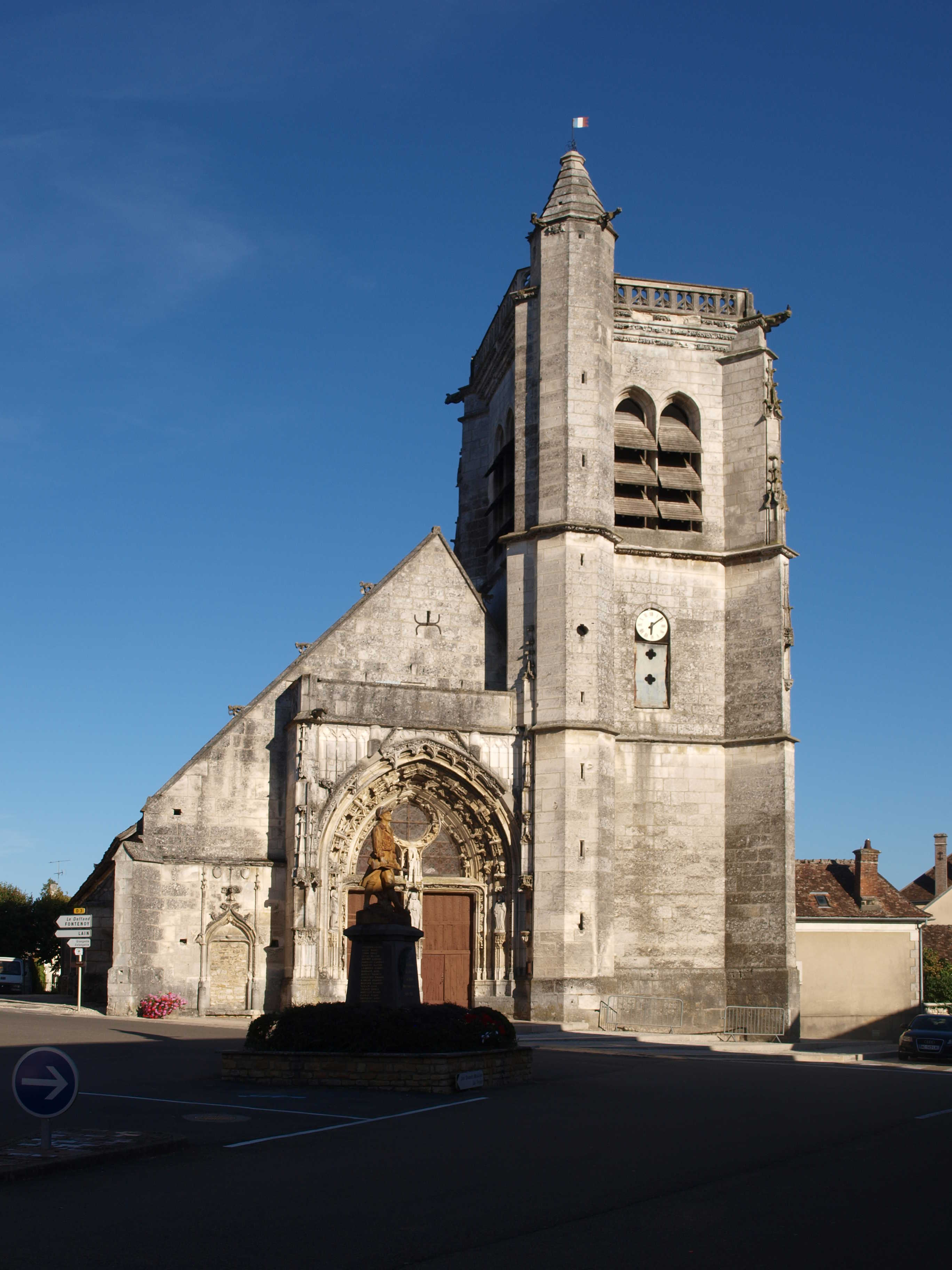
Main facade

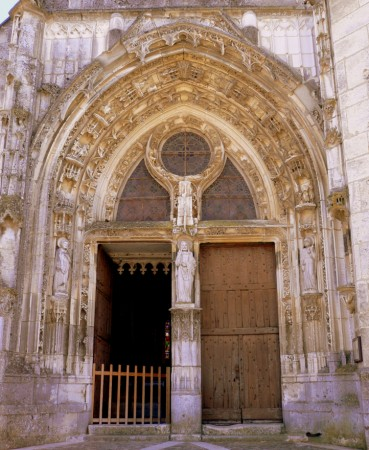
Main portal carved in 1521

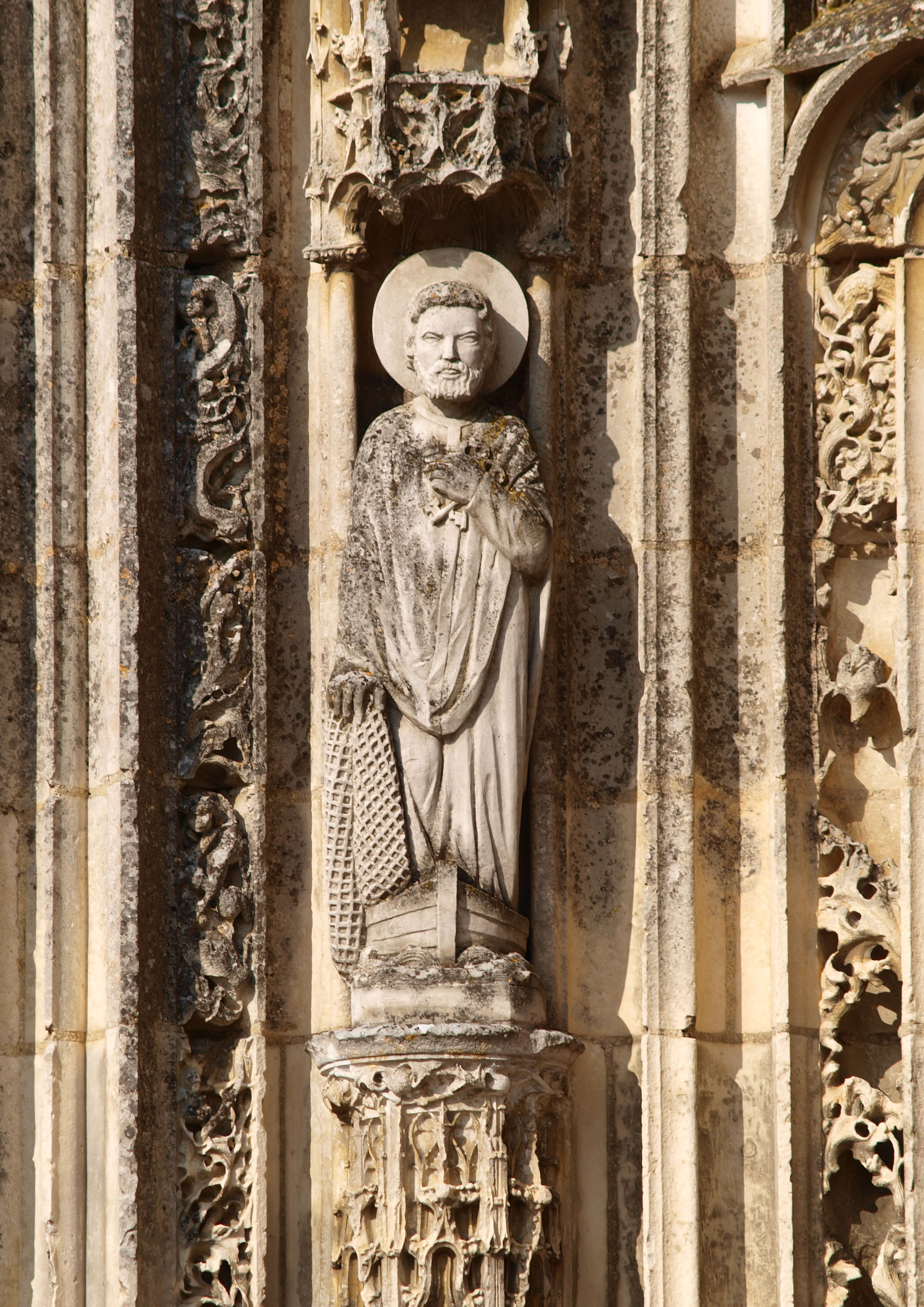
Modern statue of St Peter on the main portal

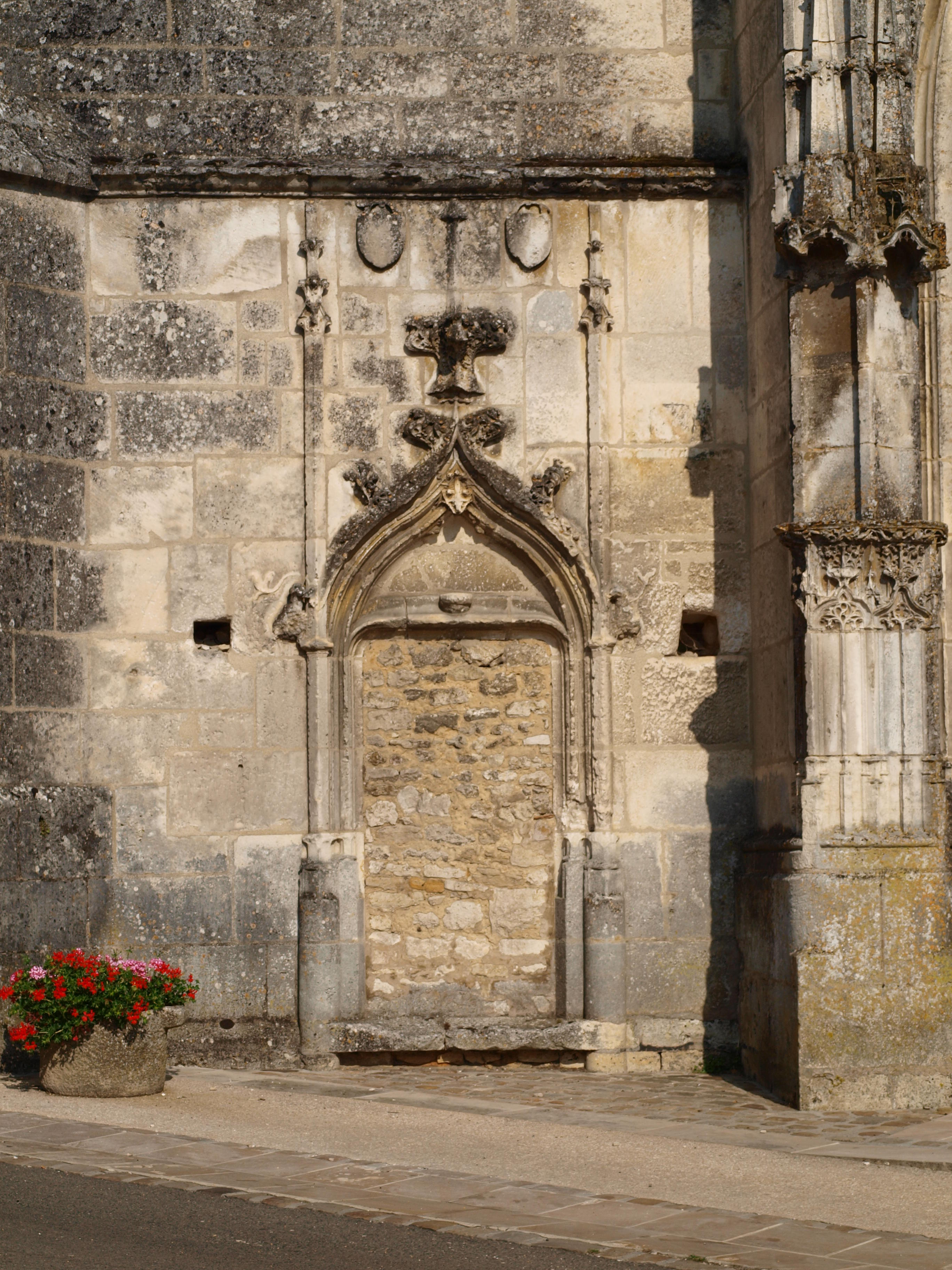
Side portal

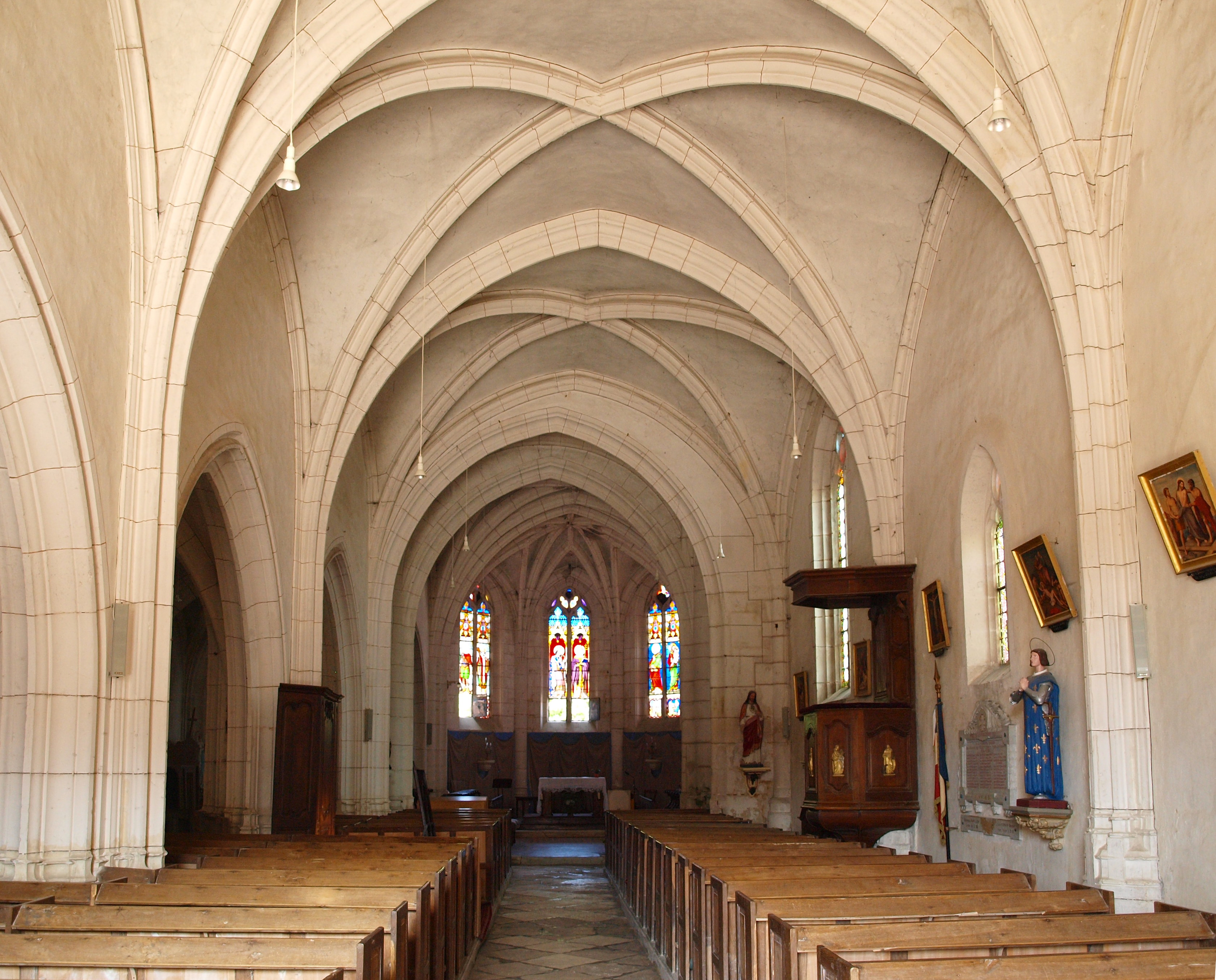
Interior

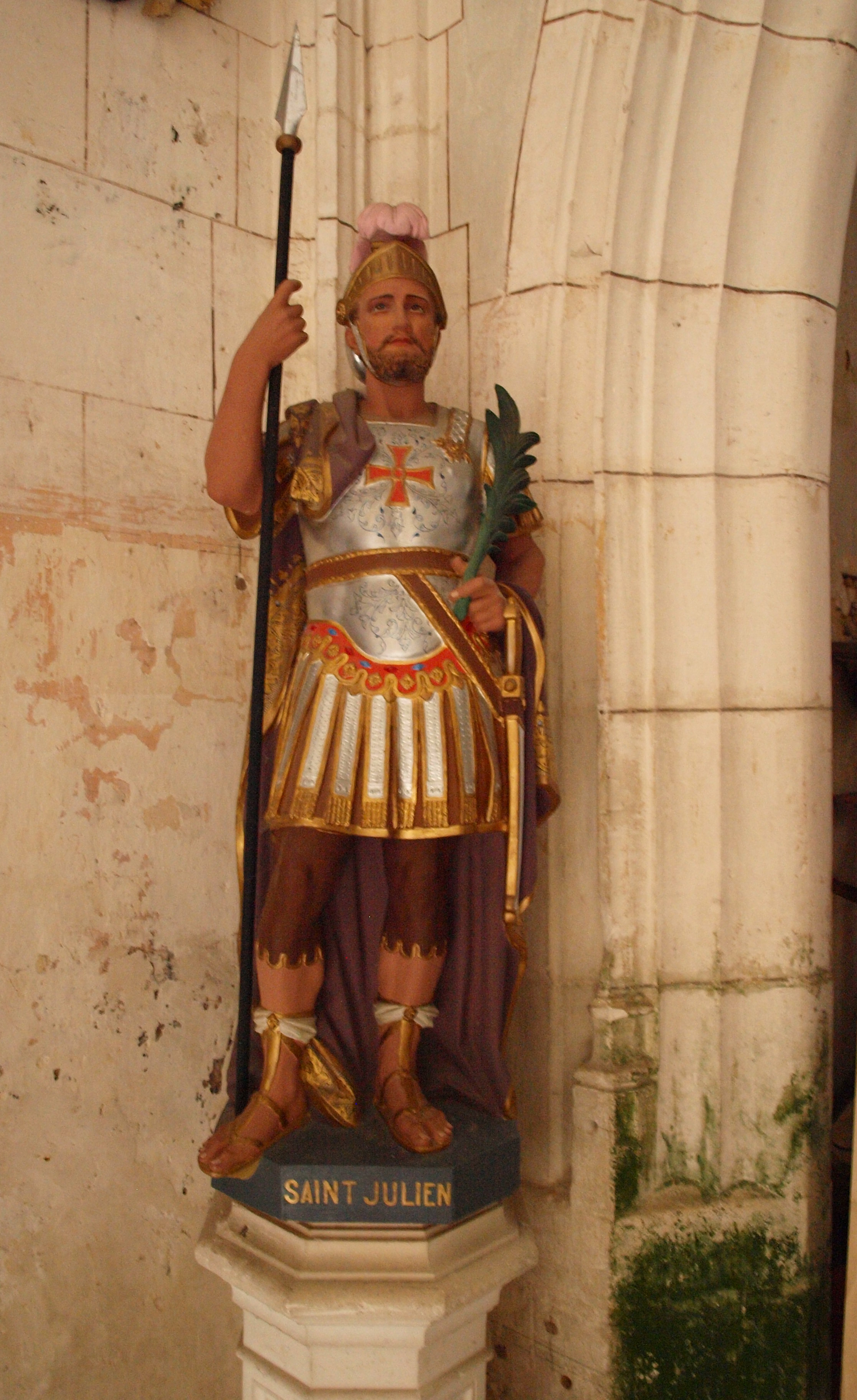
Modern statue of St Julian of Brioude

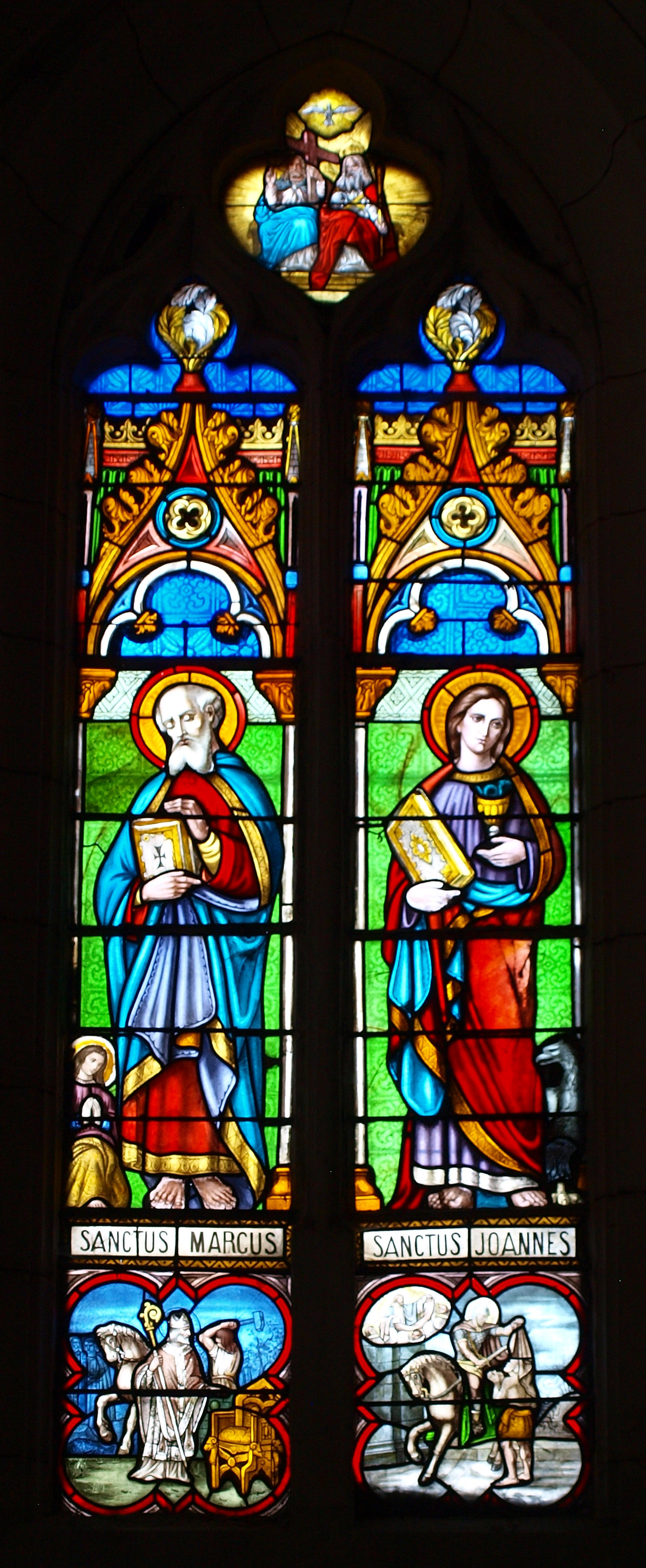
Stained glass window

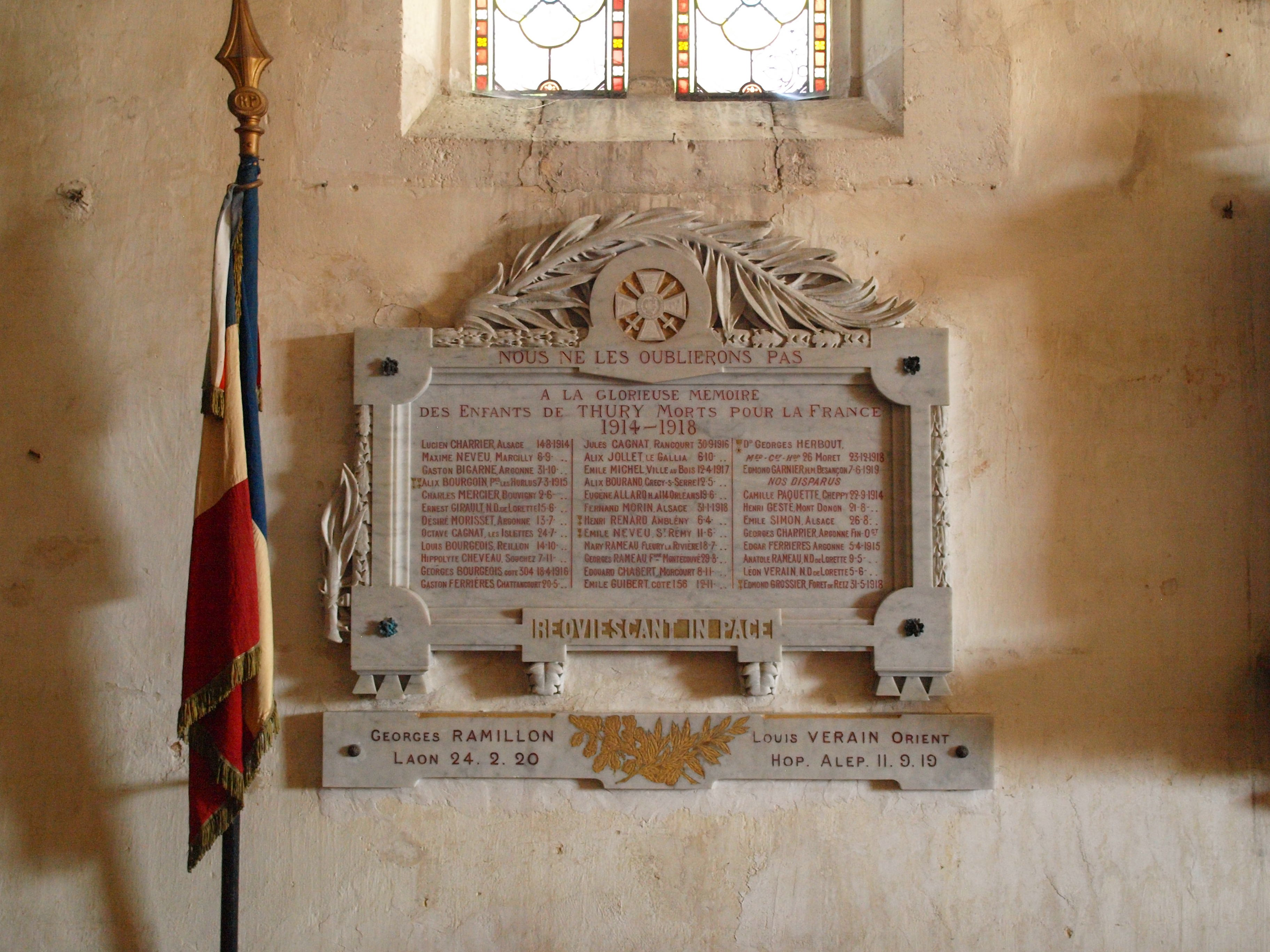
World War I memorial plaque

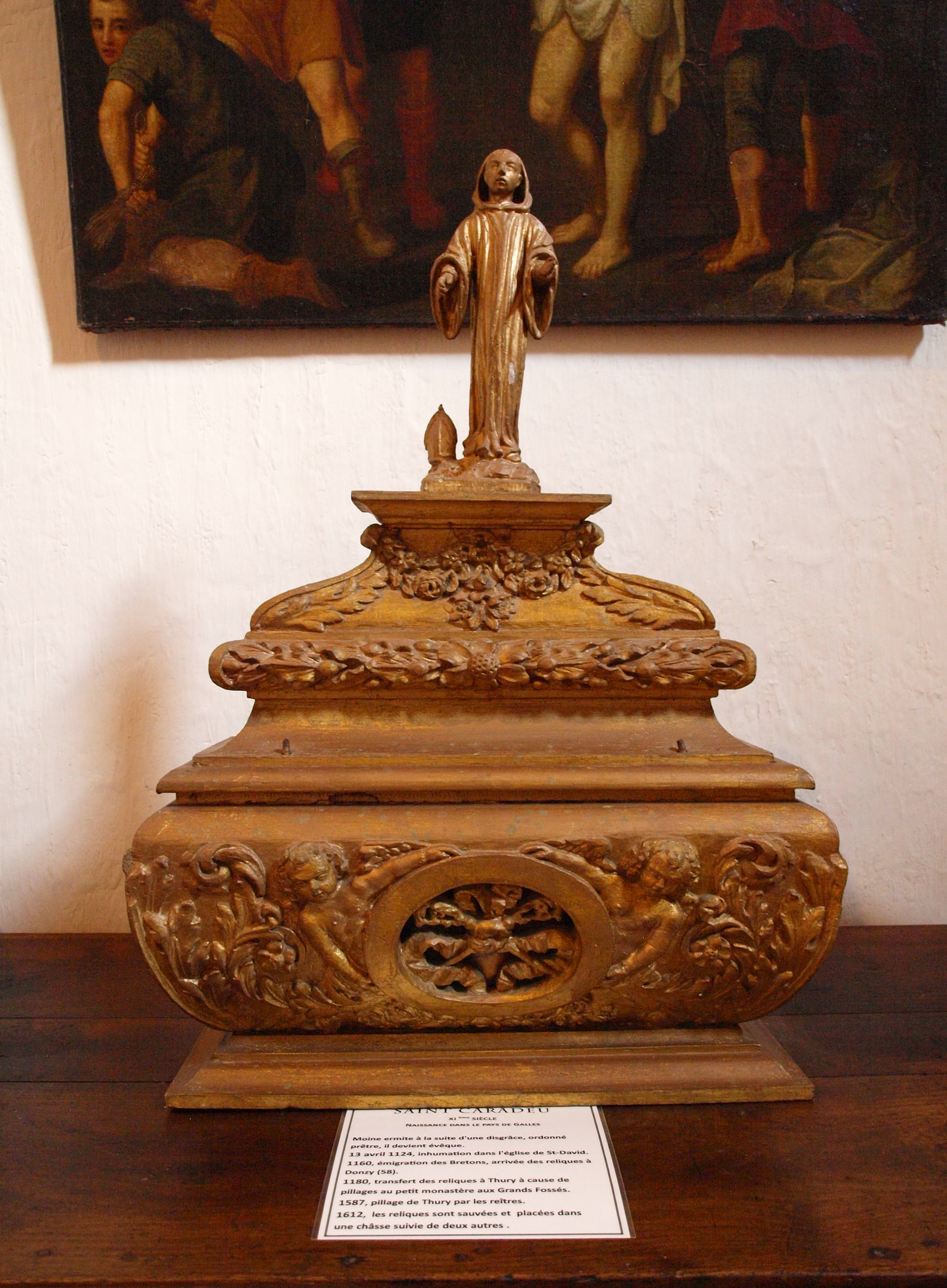
Shrine of St Caradoc

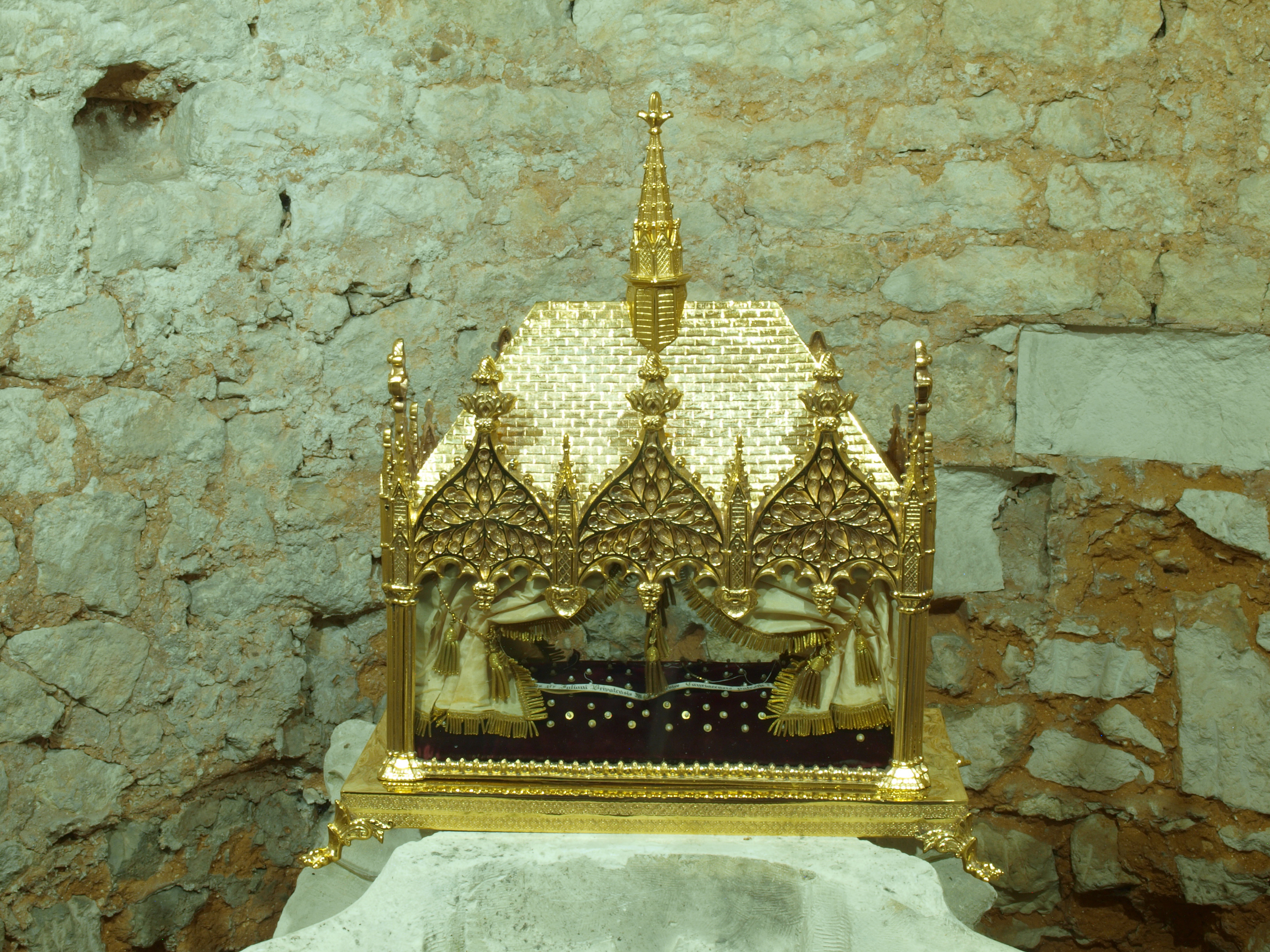
Shrine of St Julian

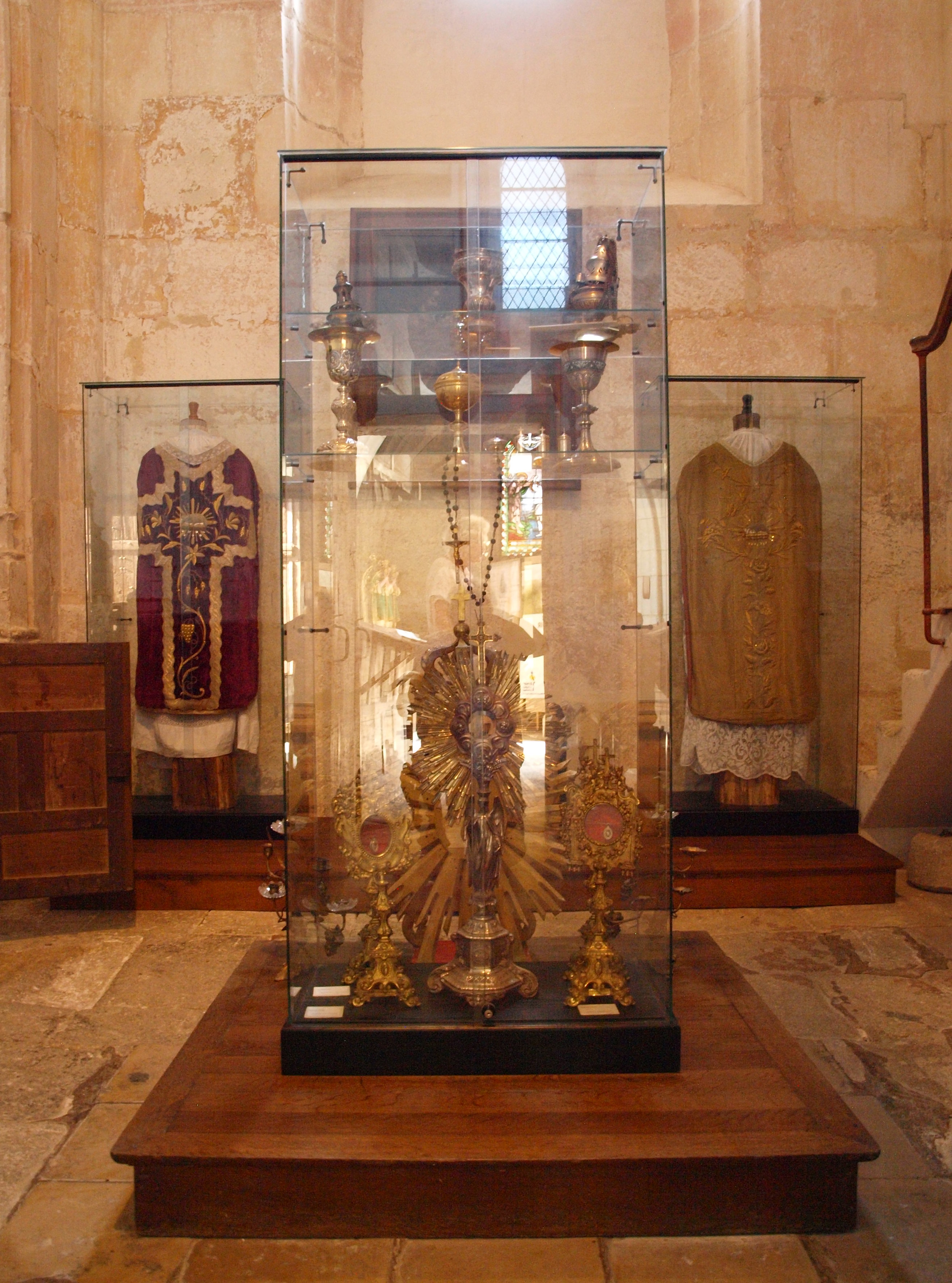
Museum in the Church tower

=== Village castle ===
The village castle, or fortified mansion, was built around the mid-15th century as Thury was starting to recover from the Hundred Years' War. It remained the abode of the local lords of Thury until the 18th century, when absentee lords transformed it into a hostel. Jacques-Marie de Caritat de Condorcet, Bishop of Auxerre, stayed there in 1760 to signal his displeasure with the local priest, who was a Jansenist. In 1768 Louis Joseph Marie André Gabriel de Castellane, the last lord of Thury, took residence there again, but in 1786 moved permanently to his Parisian Hôtel particulier on Rue Portefoin. The property was sold in 1800 to the former lord of nearby Lainsecq. In 1849, the local Briot family purchased it from the family of former mayor Edme Rouger, and still owns and occupies it.

A separate property, on the road towards Saint-Sauveur, is also known locally as the Château de Thury. It was built in the late 19th century by Thury-born businessman Casimir Félix Angilbert, who was the village's mayor from 1893 to 1913. Angilbert also sponsored the creation in 1900 of a mall of chestnut trees (Allée des marronniers) on the other side of the road, leading to the house of his cousin Alix.

=== World War I Monument ===
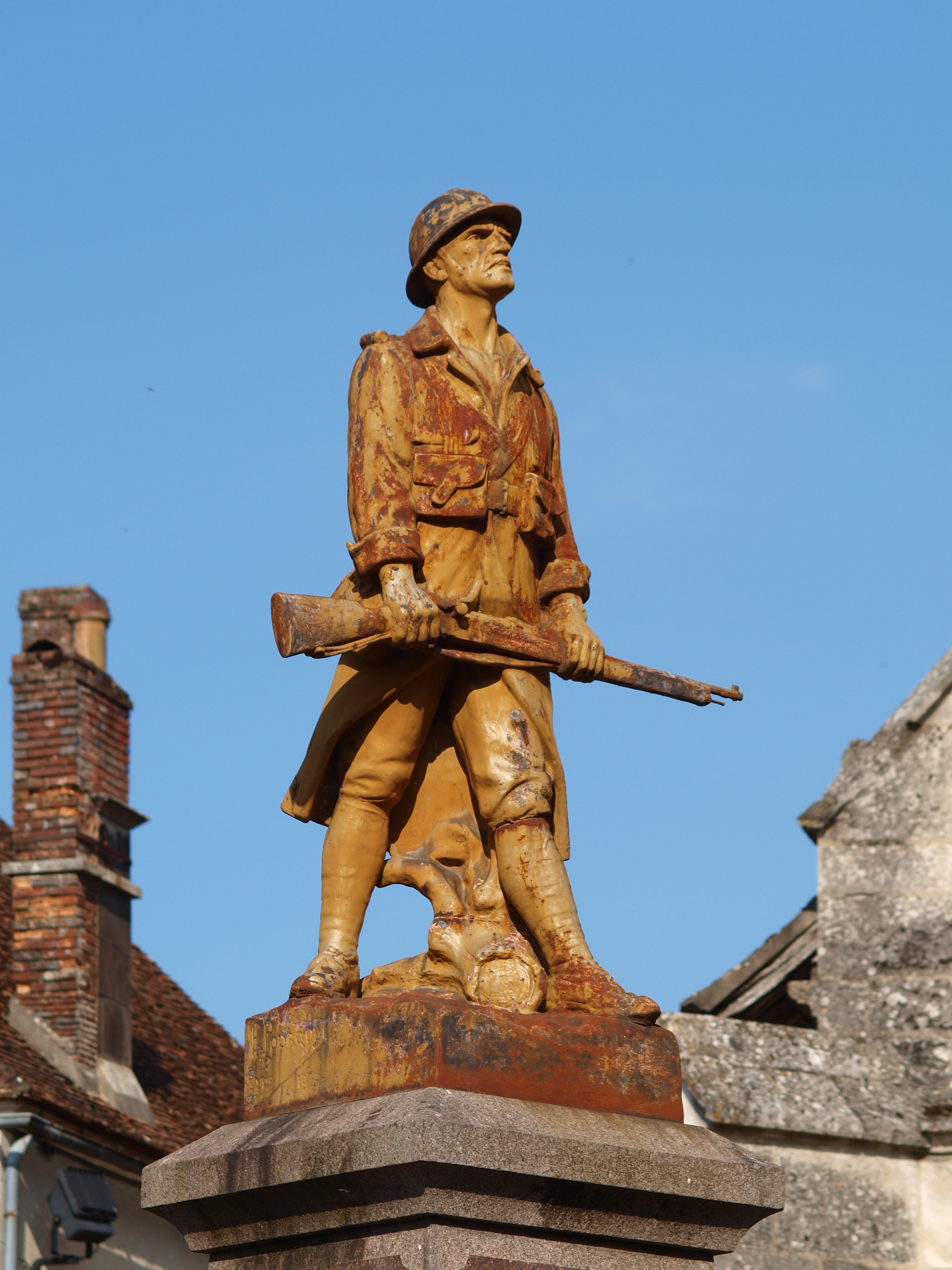
Thury's World War I monument

The World War I monument stands in the middle of the village square. It was inaugurated in 1925 after six years of preparations. The statue of a resolute poilu is a cast of Charles-Henri Pourquet's sculpture, La Résistance, manufactured by the Foundry of Val d'Osne and also adopted by hundreds of other French villages for the same purpose.

Most of the fallen soldiers died on the Western Front. One, Louis André Vérain (born in 1899), died on 28 September 1920 at a field hospital in Aleppo, in the aftermath of the Franco-Syrian War.

=== Old lavoir ===
The village lavoir, on the road towards Saint-Sauveur, was built in the early 19th century and is well preserved.

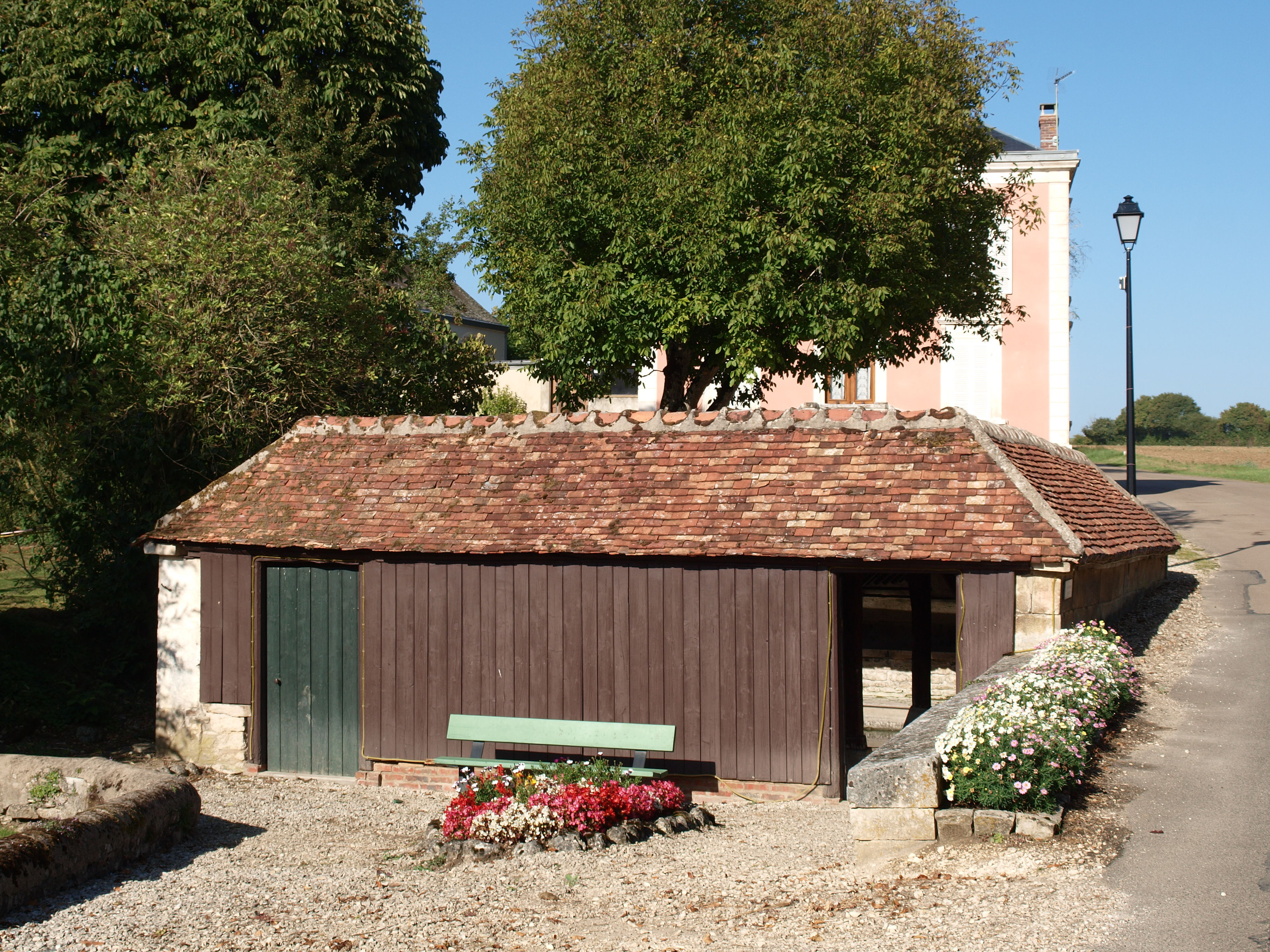
Lavoir exterior

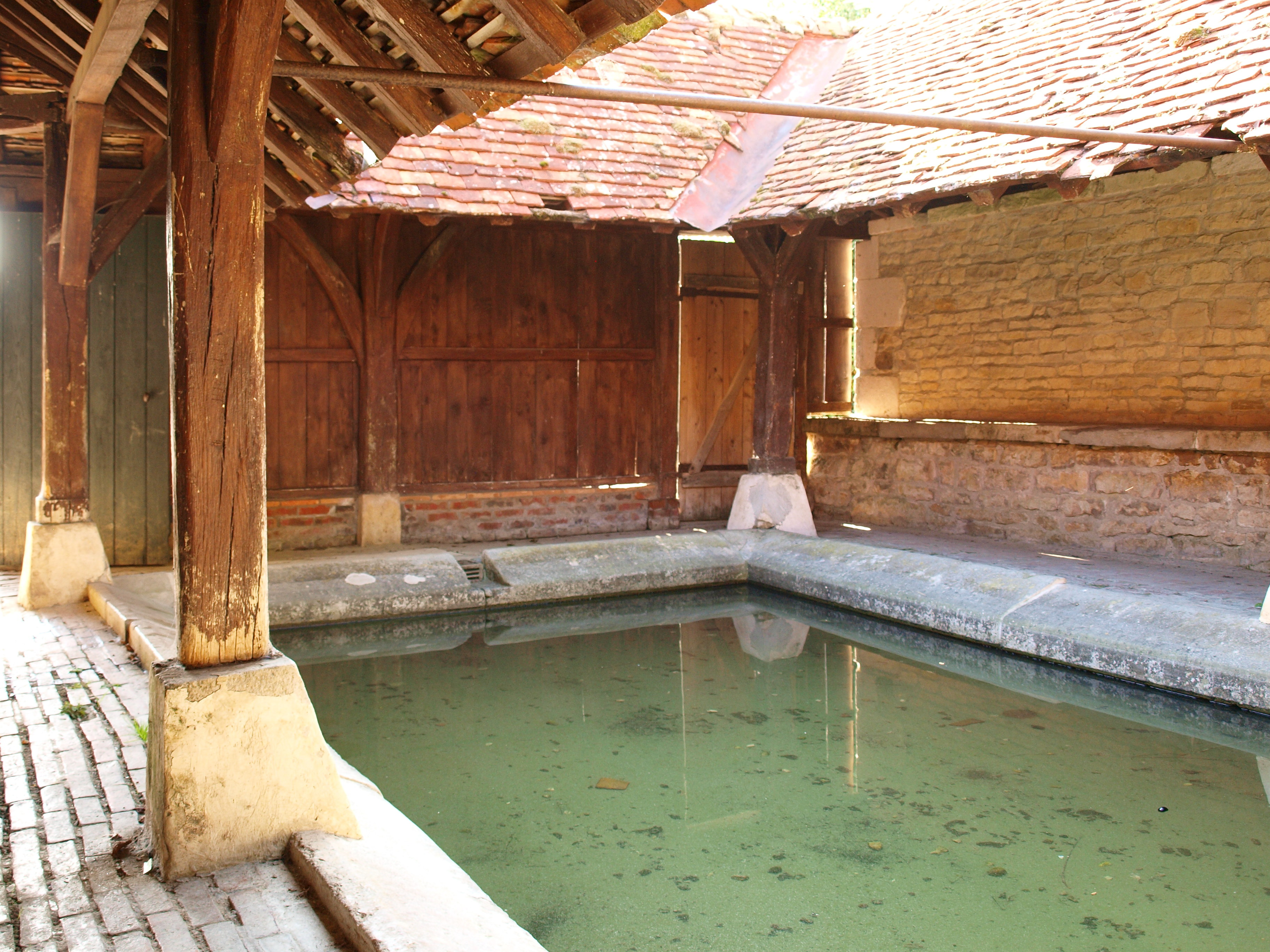
Lavoir interior

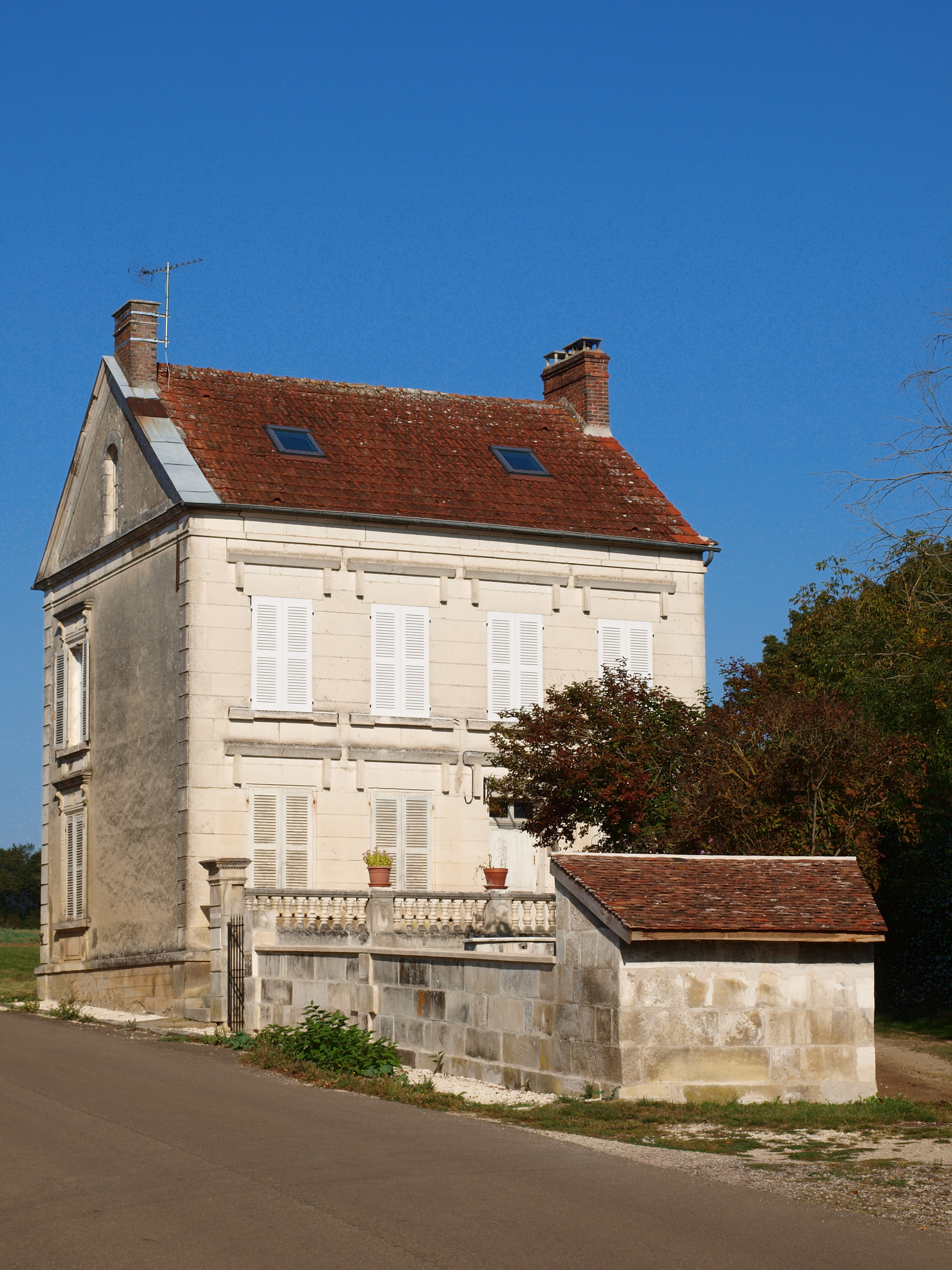
old house in front of the lavoir

== Local activities ==
- Every day of the summer of 2009 except Monday, opening the church access to and Lapidary Museum panorama tower 15 h 00-18 h 00.
- Grain Fair in February, nearest 25.
- Academy of Chamber Music of Thury: 1–13 August. Several concerts in the churches of the canton, with the closing concert 13 August in the church of Thury.
- Feast of Saint Julien, the third Sunday in August.
- Heritage Days, historical and architectural tour of the village (2 hours) and open multiple sites (press, forge, mayor, cadastre of 1825, church and bell tower, etc.)..
- The Seniors Club, named Printemps malgré tout, participates in various events within the municipality and organizes cultural trips for its members.
- Library with over 4000 volumes, contributes to the promotion of culture. Custodian of the county library, it provides access to over 150,000 books.
- Le P'tit Thurycois, the village's local journal, has been published on a quarterly basis from spring 1983.

== See also ==
- Communes of the Yonne department
