= Sainte-Colombe-sur-Loing =

- Part of Treigny-Perreuse-Sainte-Colombe
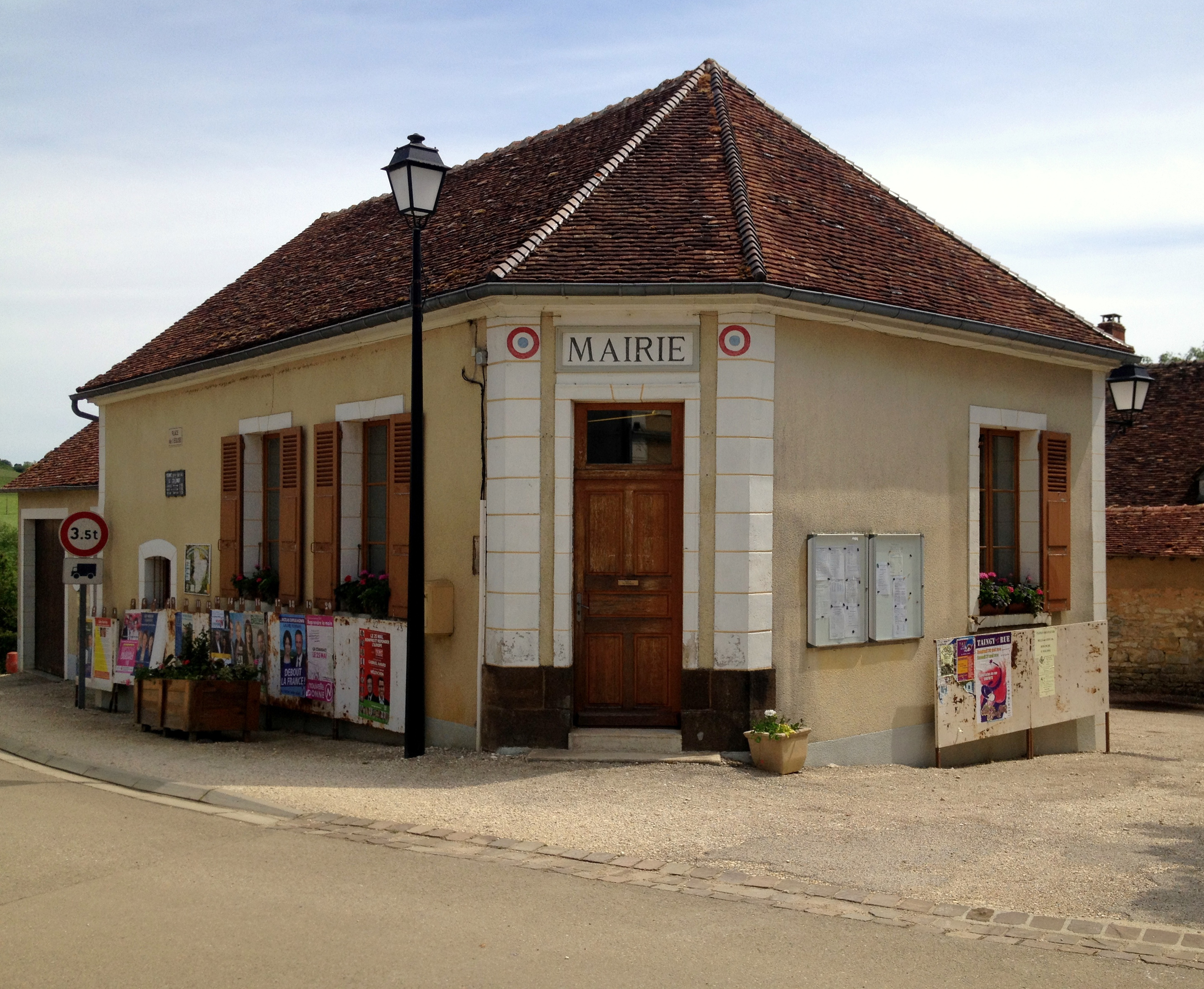
- Town hall
- Location of Sainte-Colombe-sur-Loing
- Location within France Location within Bourgogne-Franche-Comté
- Coordinates: 47°34′14″N 3°14′07″E
- Country: France
- Region: Bourgogne-Franche-Comté
- Department: Yonne
- Arrondissement: Auxerre
- Canton: Vincelles
- Commune: Treigny-Perreuse-Sainte-Colombe
- Area^{1}: 14.76 km^{2} (5.70 sq mi)
- Highest elevation: 345 m (1,132 ft)
- Lowest elevation: 238 m (781 ft)
- Population (2022): 232
  - Density: 15.7/km^{2} (40.7/sq mi)
- Time zone: UTC+01:00 (CET)
  - Summer (DST): UTC+02:00 (CEST)
- Postal code: 89520
- ^{1} French Land Register data, which excludes lakes, ponds, glaciers > 1 km^{2} (0.386 sq mi or 247 acres) and river estuaries.

Sainte-Colombe-sur-Loing (French pronunciation: [sɛ̃t kɔlɔ̃b syʁ lwɛ̃], literally Sainte-Colombe on Loing) is a former commune in the Yonne department in Bourgogne-Franche-Comté in north-central France. On 1 January 2019, it was merged into the new commune Treigny-Perreuse-Sainte-Colombe.

== See also ==
- Communes of the Yonne department
