= Vincelles, Yonne =

Vincelles
- Commune
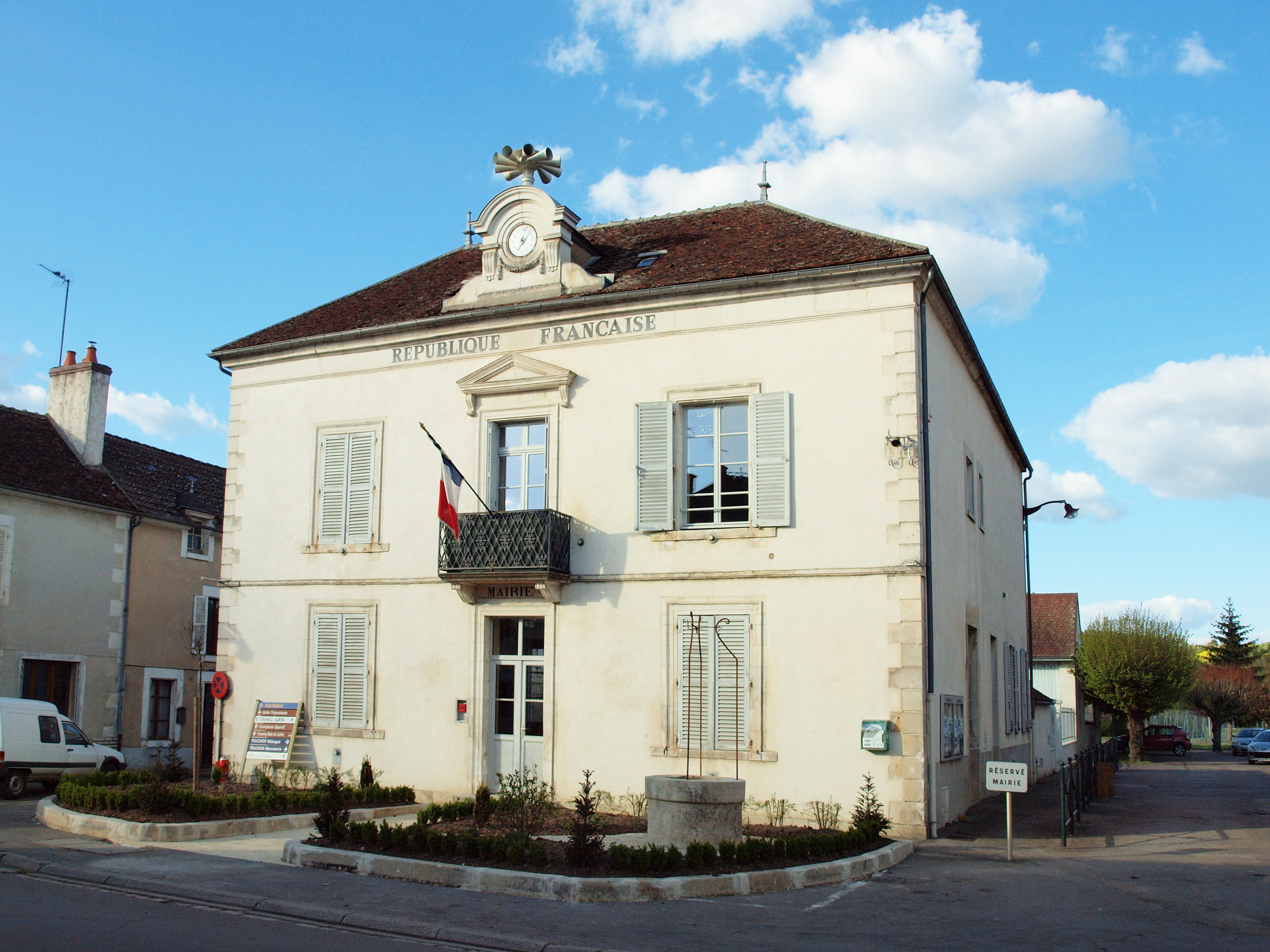
- The town hall in Vincelles
- Location of Vincelles
- Location within France Location within Bourgogne-Franche-Comté
- Coordinates: 47°42′17″N 3°37′57″E
- Country: France
- Region: Bourgogne-Franche-Comté
- Department: Yonne
- Arrondissement: Auxerre
- Canton: Vincelles
- Intercommunality: CA Auxerrois

Government
  - Mayor (2020–2026): Guido Romano
- Area^{1}: 12.53 km^{2} (4.84 sq mi)
- Highest elevation: 278 m (912 ft)
- Lowest elevation: 103 m (338 ft)
- Population (2023): 913
  - Density: 72.9/km^{2} (189/sq mi)
- Time zone: UTC+01:00 (CET)
  - Summer (DST): UTC+02:00 (CEST)
- INSEE/Postal code: 89478 /89290
- ^{1} French Land Register data, which excludes lakes, ponds, glaciers > 1 km^{2} (0.386 sq mi or 247 acres) and river estuaries.

Vincelles (French pronunciation: [vɛ̃sɛl]) is a commune in the Yonne department in Bourgogne-Franche-Comté in north-central France.

== See also ==
- Communes of the Yonne department
