= Coulangeron =

- Commune
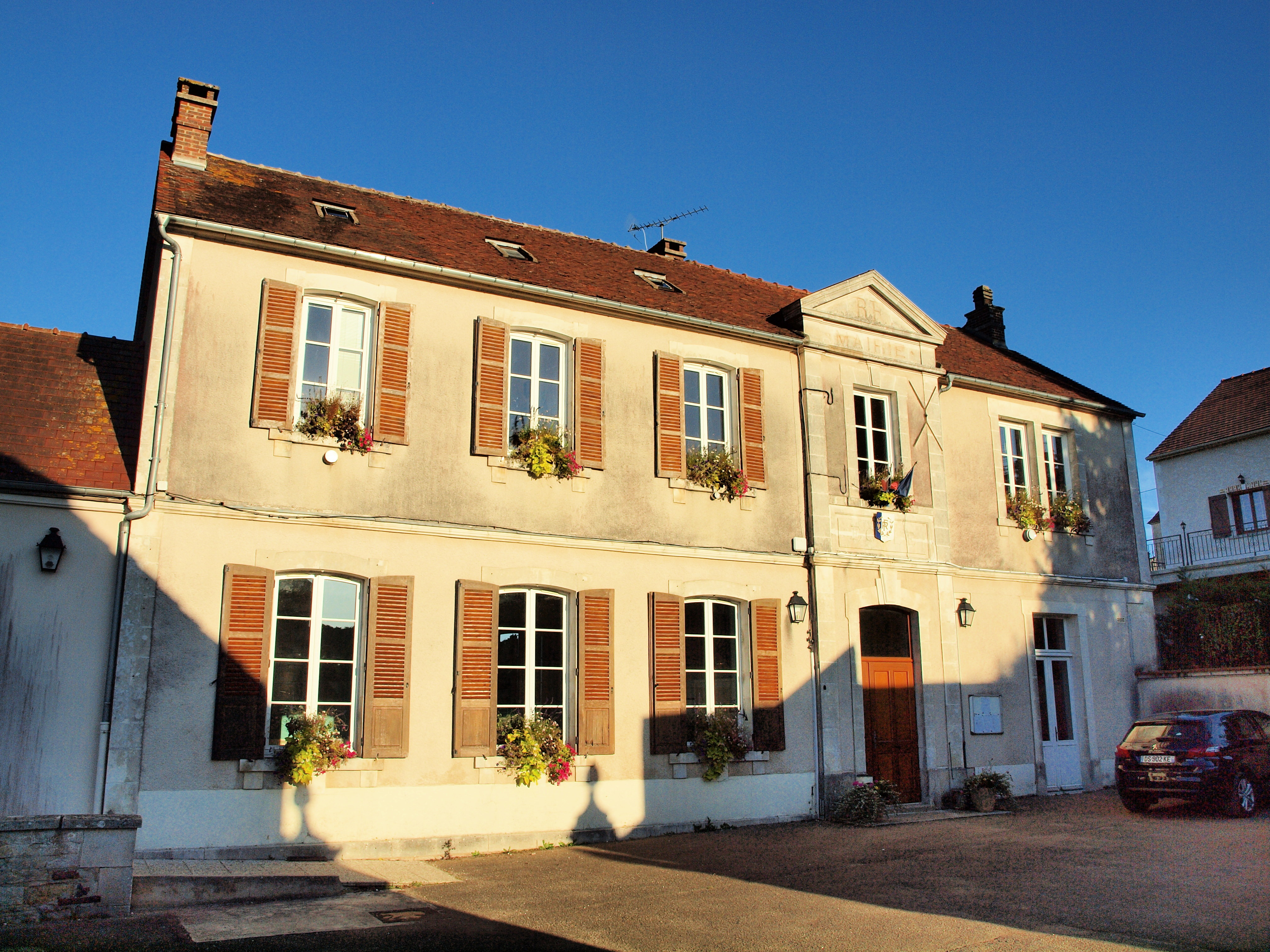
- The town hall in Coulangeron
- Location of Coulangeron
- Location within France Location within Bourgogne-Franche-Comté
- Coordinates: 47°40′54″N 3°28′15″E
- Country: France
- Region: Bourgogne-Franche-Comté
- Department: Yonne
- Arrondissement: Auxerre
- Canton: Vincelles

Government
  - Mayor (2020–2026): Philippe Vigouroux
- Area^{1}: 8.52 km^{2} (3.29 sq mi)
- Highest elevation: 346 m (1,135 ft)
- Lowest elevation: 195 m (640 ft)
- Population (2023): 212
  - Density: 24.9/km^{2} (64.4/sq mi)
- Time zone: UTC+01:00 (CET)
  - Summer (DST): UTC+02:00 (CEST)
- INSEE/Postal code: 89117 /89580
- ^{1} French Land Register data, which excludes lakes, ponds, glaciers > 1 km^{2} (0.386 sq mi or 247 acres) and river estuaries.

Coulangeron (French pronunciation: [kulɑ̃ʒʁɔ̃]) is a commune in the Yonne department in Bourgogne-Franche-Comté in north-central France, in the natural region of Forterre.

== See also ==
- Communes of the Yonne department
