= Courson-les-Carrières =

- Commune
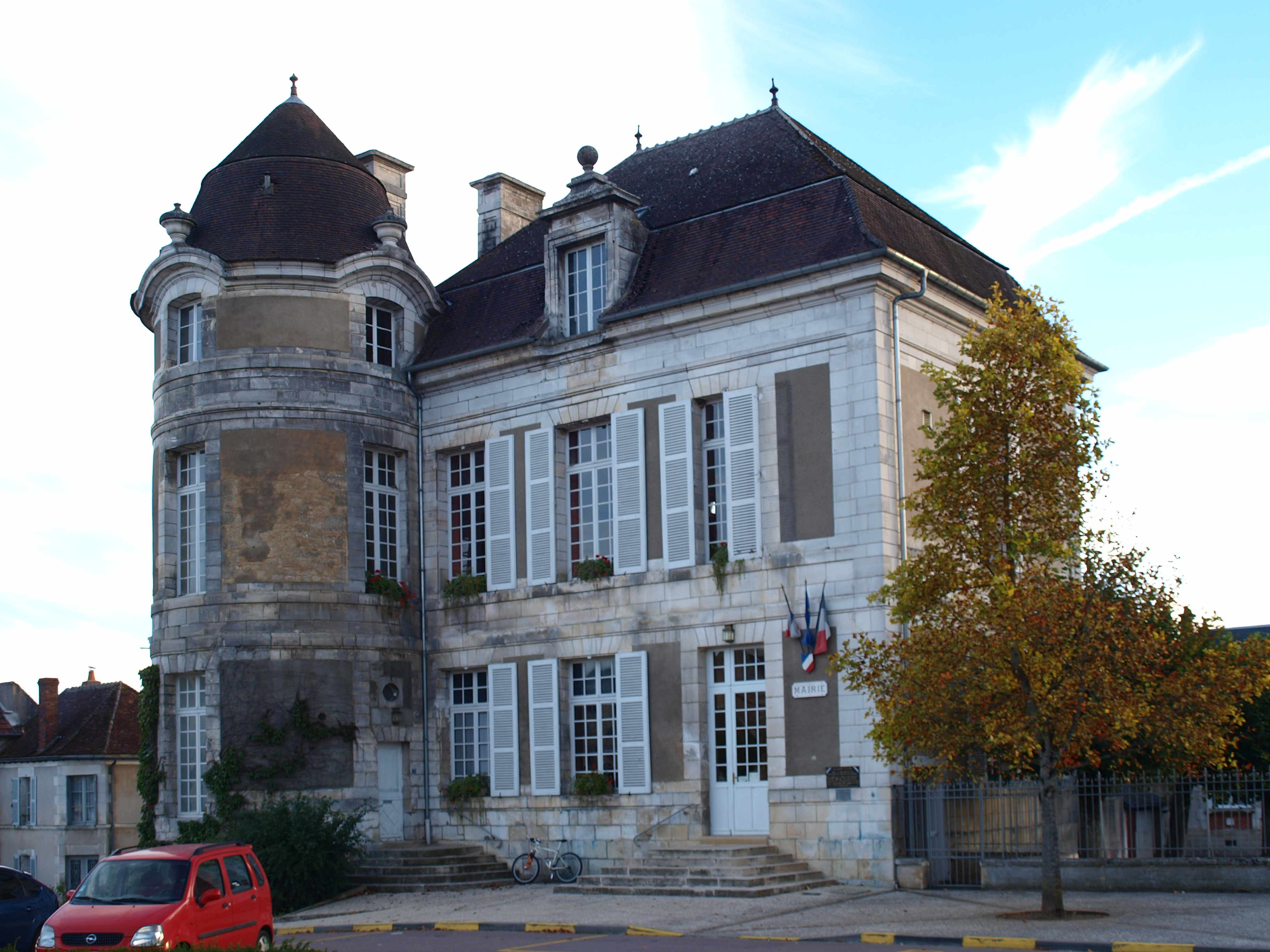
- The town hall in Courson-les-Carrières
- Location of Courson-les-Carrières
- Location within France Location within Bourgogne-Franche-Comté
- Coordinates: 47°36′55″N 3°30′03″E
- Country: France
- Region: Bourgogne-Franche-Comté
- Department: Yonne
- Arrondissement: Auxerre
- Canton: Vincelles

Government
  - Mayor (2023–2026): Maryline Thieulent
- Area^{1}: 34.16 km^{2} (13.19 sq mi)
- Highest elevation: 345 m (1,132 ft)
- Lowest elevation: 188 m (617 ft)
- Population (2023): 900
  - Density: 26/km^{2} (68/sq mi)
- Time zone: UTC+01:00 (CET)
  - Summer (DST): UTC+02:00 (CEST)
- INSEE/Postal code: 89125 /89560
- ^{1} French Land Register data, which excludes lakes, ponds, glaciers > 1 km^{2} (0.386 sq mi or 247 acres) and river estuaries.

Courson-les-Carrières (French pronunciation: [kuʁsɔ̃ le kaʁjɛʁ]) is a commune in the Yonne department in Bourgogne-Franche-Comté in north-central France. The commune lies 23 km (14 mi) south of Auxerre on the main N151 road from Auxerre to Clamecy. It is the largest single settlement in the natural region of Forterre.

The commune covers 20,364 hectares of which 4937 is woodland and extends to Frétoy Forest. It is on the Portland limestone plateau, and the distinctive local stone is seen in the buildings of the region. The source of the river Yonne lies NE of Taingy, 12 km (7.5 mi) north west of Courson. A well in Courson gives access to the deepest cave of the Yonne – the Gouffre de Villepot – at 48m depth.

The Town Hall occupies a nineteenth century manor house in the central square.

Distinguished former residents of Courson include the royal tailor Auguste François Dussautoy (1810–1873) and the photographer René Prouho (1879–1970). Courson added the Carrieres suffix in 1878. It had 1400 inhabitants in 1880.

== See also ==
- Communes of the Yonne department
