= Val-de-Mercy =

- Commune
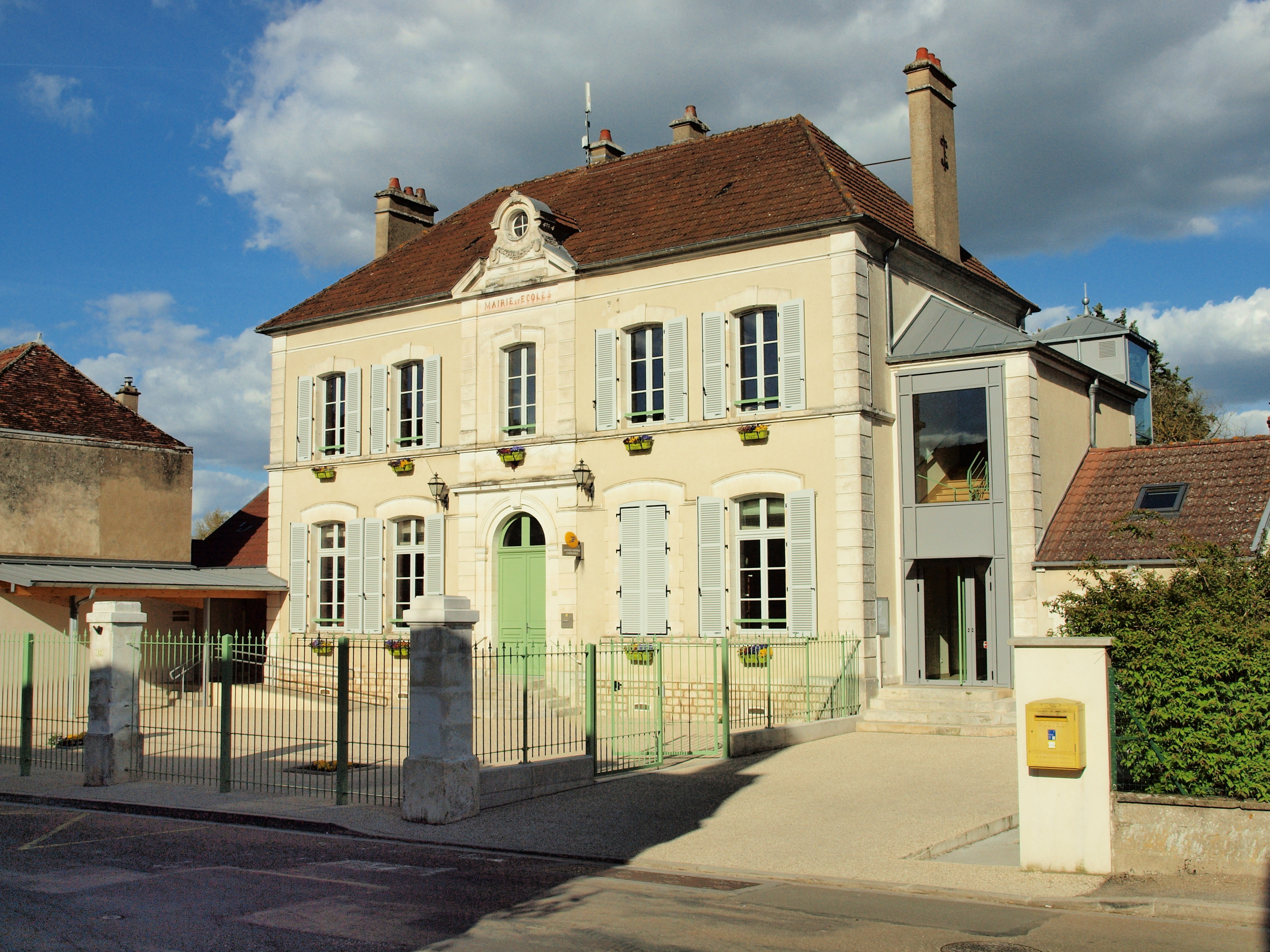
- The town hall in Val-de-Mercy
- Location of Val-de-Mercy
- Location within France Location within Bourgogne-Franche-Comté
- Coordinates: 47°40′36″N 3°35′22″E
- Country: France
- Region: Bourgogne-Franche-Comté
- Department: Yonne
- Arrondissement: Auxerre
- Canton: Vincelles

Government
  - Mayor (2020–2026): Jean-Noël Loury
- Area^{1}: 13.46 km^{2} (5.20 sq mi)
- Highest elevation: 278 m (912 ft)
- Lowest elevation: 130 m (430 ft)
- Population (2023): 363
  - Density: 27.0/km^{2} (69.8/sq mi)
- Time zone: UTC+01:00 (CET)
  - Summer (DST): UTC+02:00 (CEST)
- INSEE/Postal code: 89426 /89580
- ^{1} French Land Register data, which excludes lakes, ponds, glaciers > 1 km^{2} (0.386 sq mi or 247 acres) and river estuaries.

Val-de-Mercy (French pronunciation: [val də mɛʁsi]) is a commune in the Yonne department in Bourgogne-Franche-Comté in north-central France, in the natural region of Forterre.

== See also ==
- Communes of the Yonne department
