= Mouffy =

- Commune
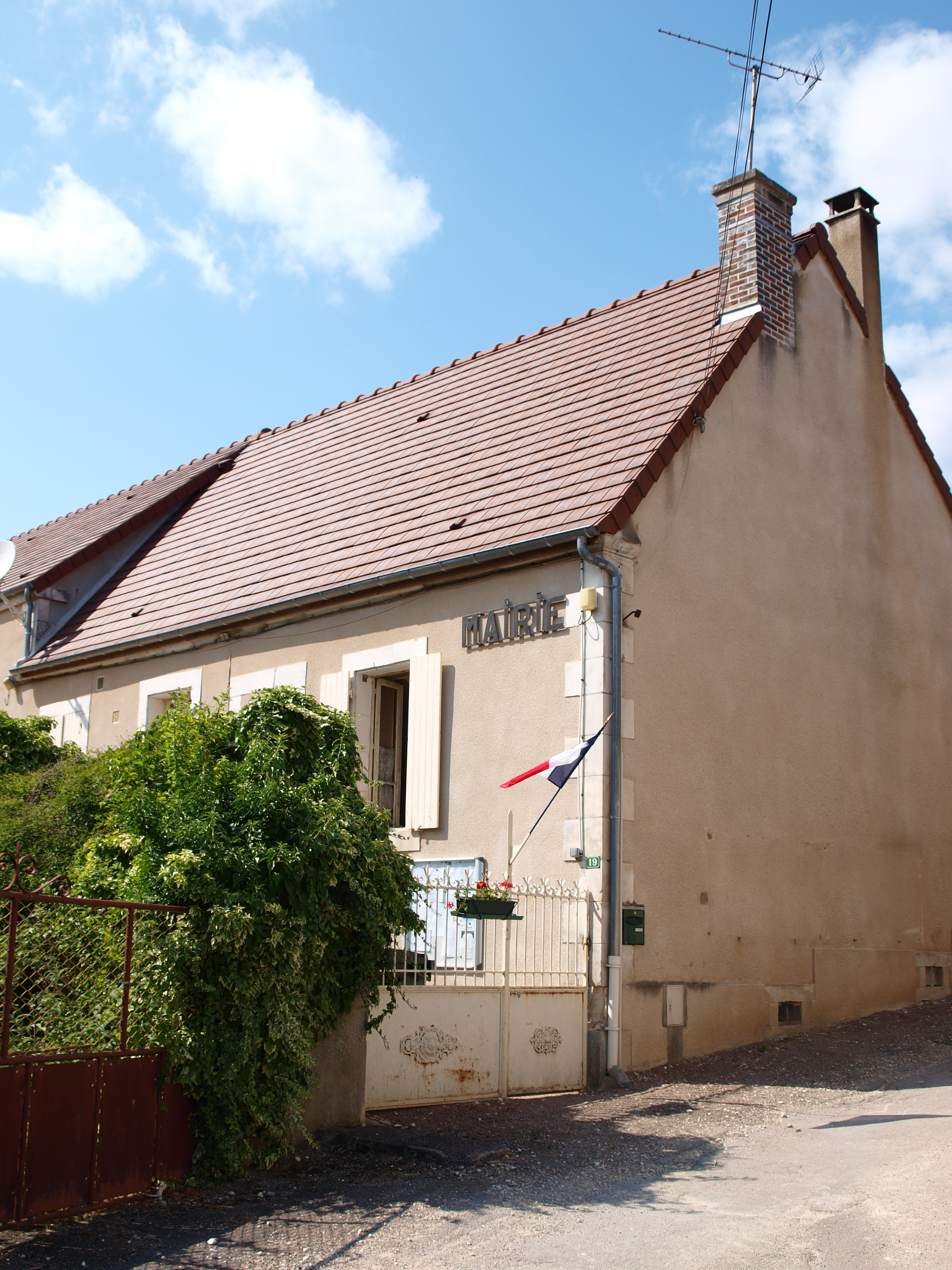
- The town hall in Mouffy
- Location of Mouffy
- Location within France Location within Bourgogne-Franche-Comté
- Coordinates: 47°39′07″N 3°31′03″E
- Country: France
- Region: Bourgogne-Franche-Comté
- Department: Yonne
- Arrondissement: Auxerre
- Canton: Vincelles

Government
  - Mayor (2020–2026): Jean Desnoyers
- Area^{1}: 4.89 km^{2} (1.89 sq mi)
- Highest elevation: 343 m (1,125 ft)
- Lowest elevation: 210 m (690 ft)
- Population (2023): 137
  - Density: 28.0/km^{2} (72.6/sq mi)
- Time zone: UTC+01:00 (CET)
  - Summer (DST): UTC+02:00 (CEST)
- INSEE/Postal code: 89270 /89560
- ^{1} French Land Register data, which excludes lakes, ponds, glaciers > 1 km^{2} (0.386 sq mi or 247 acres) and river estuaries.

Mouffy (French pronunciation: [mufi]) is a commune in the Yonne department of Bourgogne-Franche-Comté in north-central France, located in the natural region of Forterre.

== See also ==
- Communes of the Yonne department
