= Canton of Vincelles =

Kanton in Arrondissement Auxerre, France

Coordinates: 47.70°N 3.63°E

The canton of Vincelles is an administrative division of the Yonne department, central France. It was created at the French canton reorganisation which came into effect in March 2015. Its seat is in Vincelles.

It consists of the following communes:

1. Andryes
2. Charentenay
3. Coulangeron
4. Coulanges-la-Vineuse
5. Courson-les-Carrières
6. Druyes-les-Belles-Fontaines
7. Escamps
8. Escolives-Sainte-Camille
9. Étais-la-Sauvin
10. Fontenoy
11. Fouronnes
12. Gy-l'Évêque
13. Les Hauts de Forterre
14. Irancy
15. Jussy
16. Lain
17. Lainsecq
18. Levis
19. Merry-Sec
20. Migé
21. Mouffy
22. Moutiers-en-Puisaye
23. Ouanne
24. Sainpuits
25. Saint-Sauveur-en-Puisaye
26. Saints-en-Puisaye
27. Sementron
28. Sougères-en-Puisaye
29. Thury
30. Treigny-Perreuse-Sainte-Colombe
31. Val-de-Mercy
32. Vincelles
33. Vincelottes
