= Sougères-en-Puisaye =

- Commune
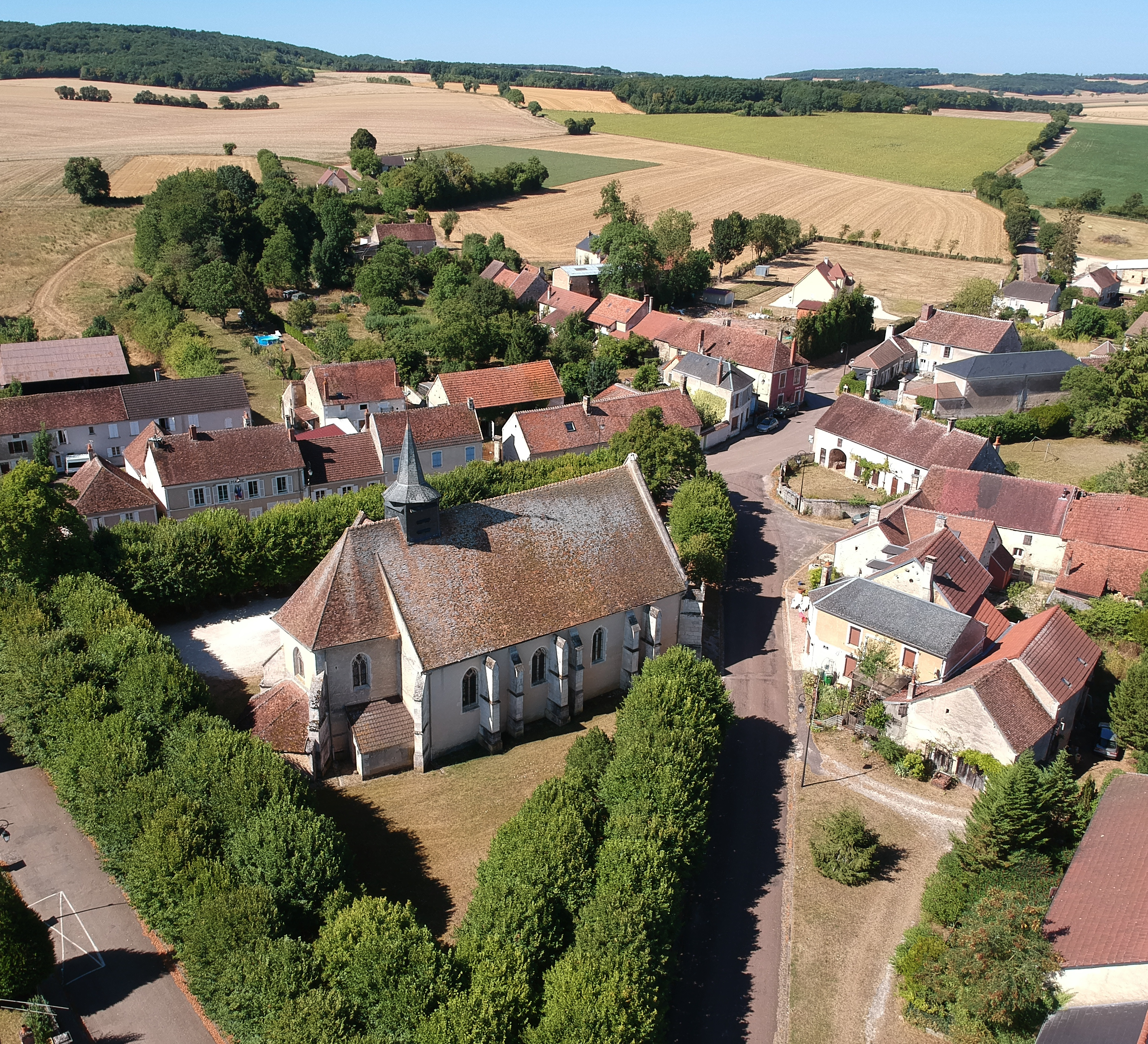
- Aerial view of Sougères-en-Puisaye (2018).

- Coat of arms
- Location of Sougères-en-Puisaye
- Location within France Location within Bourgogne-Franche-Comté
- Coordinates: 47°33′35″N 3°19′45″E
- Country: France
- Region: Bourgogne-Franche-Comté
- Department: Yonne
- Arrondissement: Auxerre
- Canton: Vincelles

Government
  - Mayor (2020–2026): Mireille Lhote
- Area^{1}: 26.50 km^{2} (10.23 sq mi)
- Highest elevation: 352 m (1,155 ft)
- Lowest elevation: 193 m (633 ft)
- Population (2023): 289
  - Density: 10.9/km^{2} (28.2/sq mi)
- Time zone: UTC+01:00 (CET)
  - Summer (DST): UTC+02:00 (CEST)
- INSEE/Postal code: 89400 /89520
- ^{1} French Land Register data, which excludes lakes, ponds, glaciers > 1 km^{2} (0.386 sq mi or 247 acres) and river estuaries.

Sougères-en-Puisaye (French pronunciation: [suʒɛʁ ɑ̃ pɥizɛ], literally Sougères in Puisaye) is a commune in the Yonne department in Bourgogne-Franche-Comté in north-central France, in the natural region of Forterre - even though its name refers to neighboring Puisaye.

Inhabitants are "Sougérois" and "Sougéroise".

== Geography ==
Sougères-en-Puisaye has few hamlets: "Les Simons" (close to the village), "Chauminet", "Pesselières", "Les Billards" and "Les Roches".

== See also ==
- Communes of the Yonne department
