= Lainsecq =

- Commune
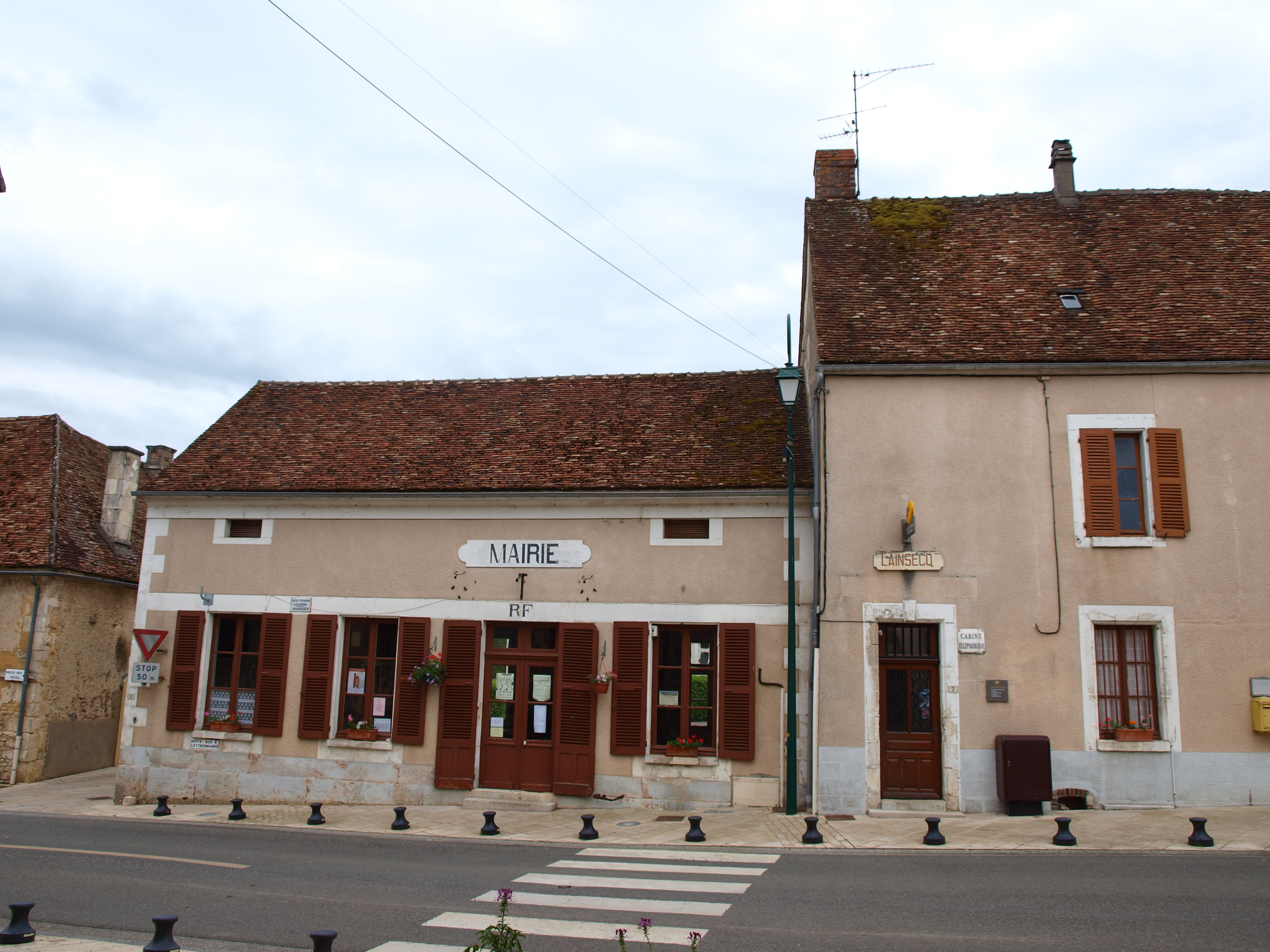
- The town hall in Lainsecq
- Location of Lainsecq
- Location within France Location within Bourgogne-Franche-Comté
- Coordinates: 47°33′20″N 3°16′28″E
- Country: France
- Region: Bourgogne-Franche-Comté
- Department: Yonne
- Arrondissement: Auxerre
- Canton: Vincelles

Government
  - Mayor (2020–2026): Nadia Choubard
- Area^{1}: 25.00 km^{2} (9.65 sq mi)
- Highest elevation: 366 m (1,201 ft)
- Lowest elevation: 219 m (719 ft)
- Population (2023): 328
  - Density: 13.1/km^{2} (34.0/sq mi)
- Time zone: UTC+01:00 (CET)
  - Summer (DST): UTC+02:00 (CEST)
- INSEE/Postal code: 89216 /89520
- ^{1} French Land Register data, which excludes lakes, ponds, glaciers > 1 km^{2} (0.386 sq mi or 247 acres) and river estuaries.

Lainsecq (French pronunciation: [lɛ̃sɛk]) is a commune in the Yonne department in Bourgogne-Franche-Comté in north-central France, in the natural region of Forterre.

== See also ==
- Communes of the Yonne department
