= Treigny-Perreuse-Sainte-Colombe =

- Commune
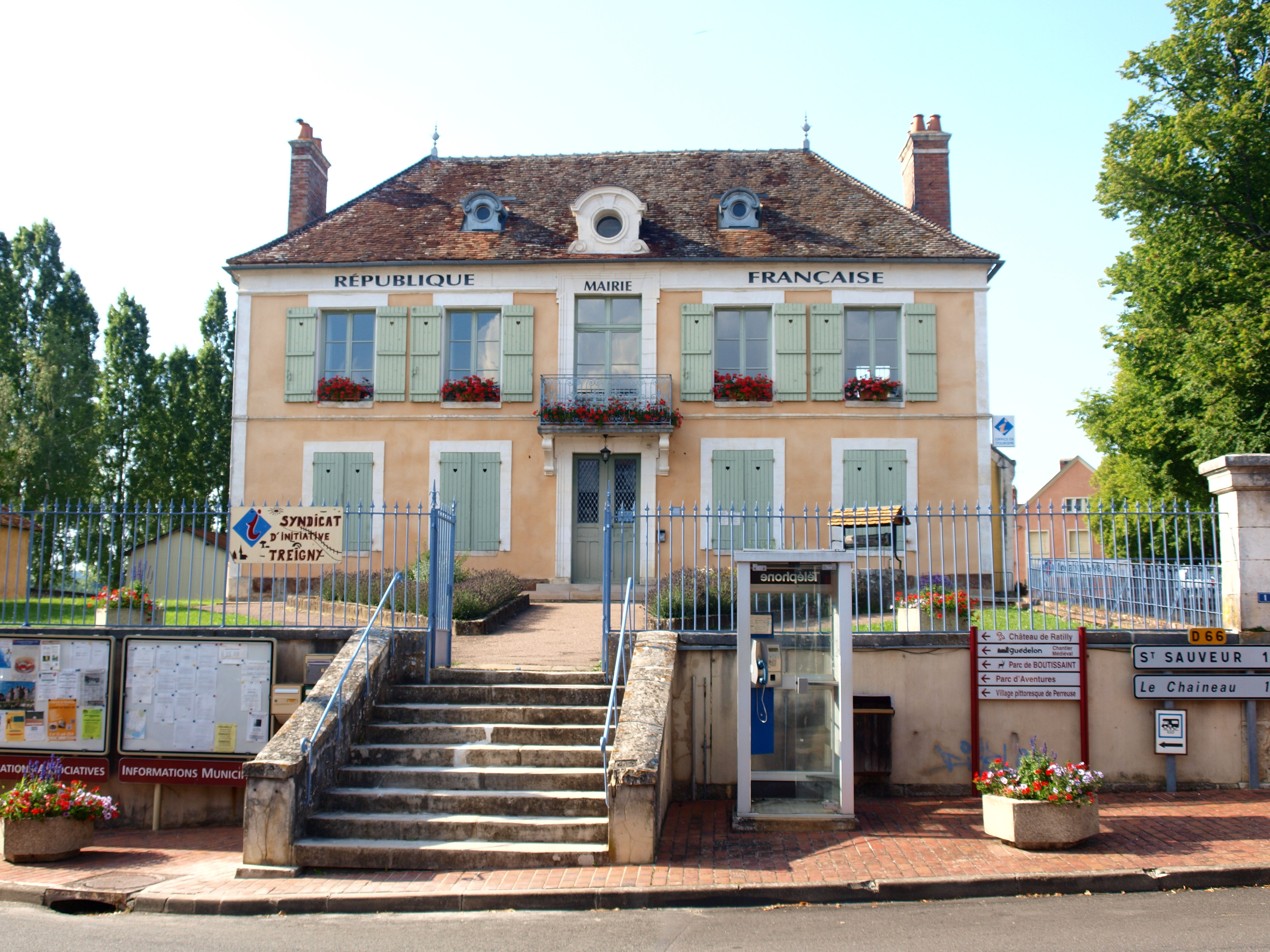
- The town hall in Treigny
- Location of Treigny-Perreuse-Sainte-Colombe
- Location within France Location within Bourgogne-Franche-Comté
- Coordinates: 47°33′05″N 3°11′05″E
- Country: France
- Region: Bourgogne-Franche-Comté
- Department: Yonne
- Arrondissement: Auxerre
- Canton: Vincelles
- Intercommunality: Puisaye-Forterre

Government
  - Mayor (2020–2026): Paulo Da Silva Moreira
- Area^{1}: 67.46 km^{2} (26.05 sq mi)
- Highest elevation: 367 m (1,204 ft)
- Lowest elevation: 187 m (614 ft)
- Population (2023): 1,083
  - Density: 16.05/km^{2} (41.58/sq mi)
- Time zone: UTC+01:00 (CET)
  - Summer (DST): UTC+02:00 (CEST)
- INSEE/Postal code: 89420 /89520
- ^{1} French Land Register data, which excludes lakes, ponds, glaciers > 1 km^{2} (0.386 sq mi or 247 acres) and river estuaries.

Treigny-Perreuse-Sainte-Colombe (French pronunciation: [tʁɛɲi pɛʁøz sɛ̃t kɔlɔ̃b]) is a commune in the Yonne department in Bourgogne-Franche-Comté in north-central France. It was established on 1 January 2019 by merger of the former communes of Treigny (the seat) and Sainte-Colombe-sur-Loing.

Its territory straddles the natural regions of Puisaye (Treigny) and Forterre (Perreuse and Sainte-Colombe).

== See also ==
- Communes of the Yonne department
