= Sementron =

- Commune
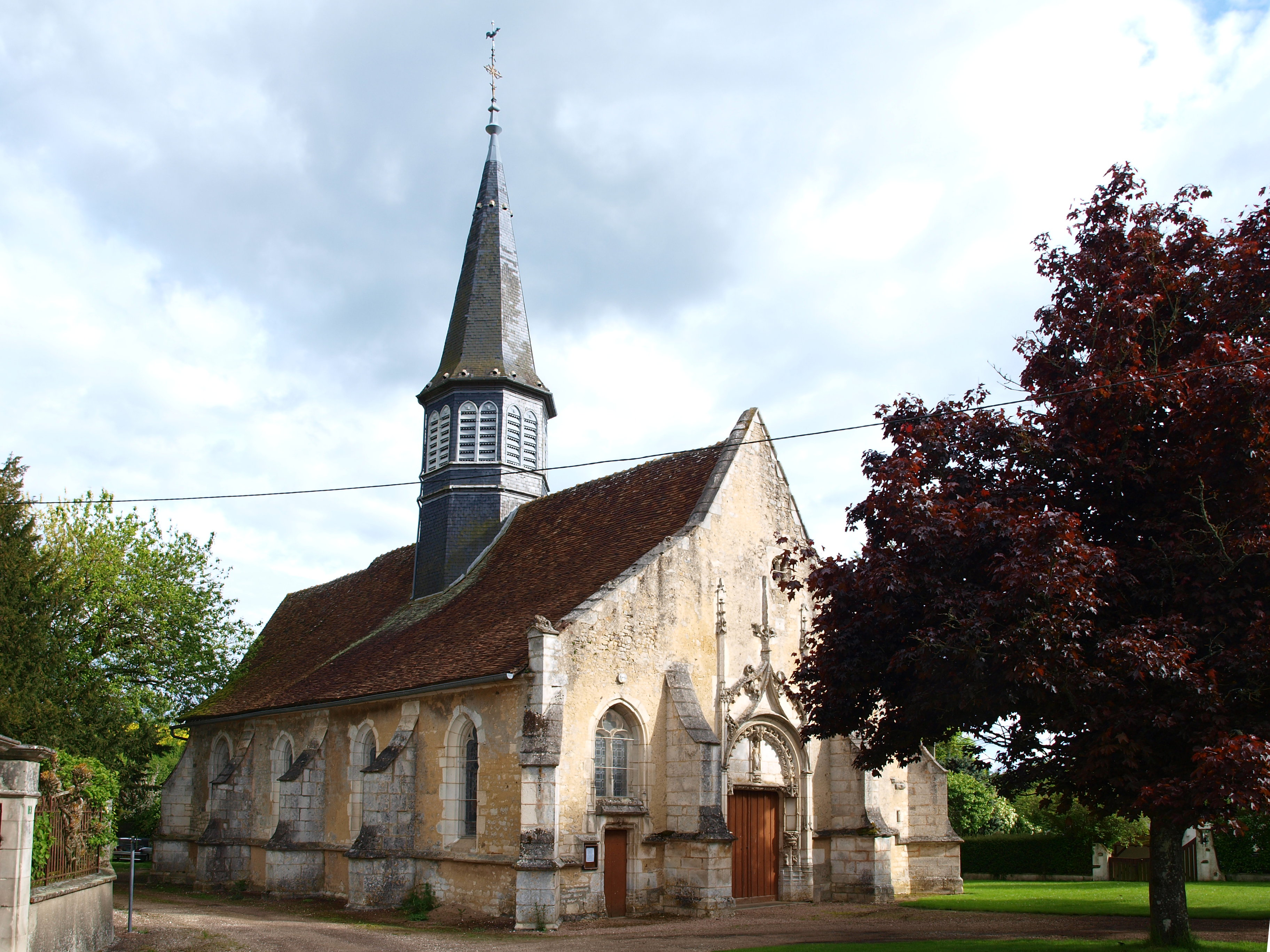
- The church in Sementron
- Location of Sementron
- Location within France Location within Bourgogne-Franche-Comté
- Coordinates: 47°38′04″N 3°21′00″E
- Country: France
- Region: Bourgogne-Franche-Comté
- Department: Yonne
- Arrondissement: Auxerre
- Canton: Vincelles

Government
  - Mayor (2020–2026): Jacques Baloup
- Area^{1}: 11.70 km^{2} (4.52 sq mi)
- Highest elevation: 339 m (1,112 ft)
- Lowest elevation: 214 m (702 ft)
- Population (2023): 107
  - Density: 9.15/km^{2} (23.7/sq mi)
- Time zone: UTC+01:00 (CET)
  - Summer (DST): UTC+02:00 (CEST)
- INSEE/Postal code: 89383 /89560
- ^{1} French Land Register data, which excludes lakes, ponds, glaciers > 1 km^{2} (0.386 sq mi or 247 acres) and river estuaries.

Sementron (French pronunciation: [səmɑ̃tʁɔ̃]) is a commune in the Yonne department in Bourgogne-Franche-Comté in north-central France, in the natural region of Forterre.

== See also ==
- Communes of the Yonne department
