= Lain, Yonne =

Lain
- Commune
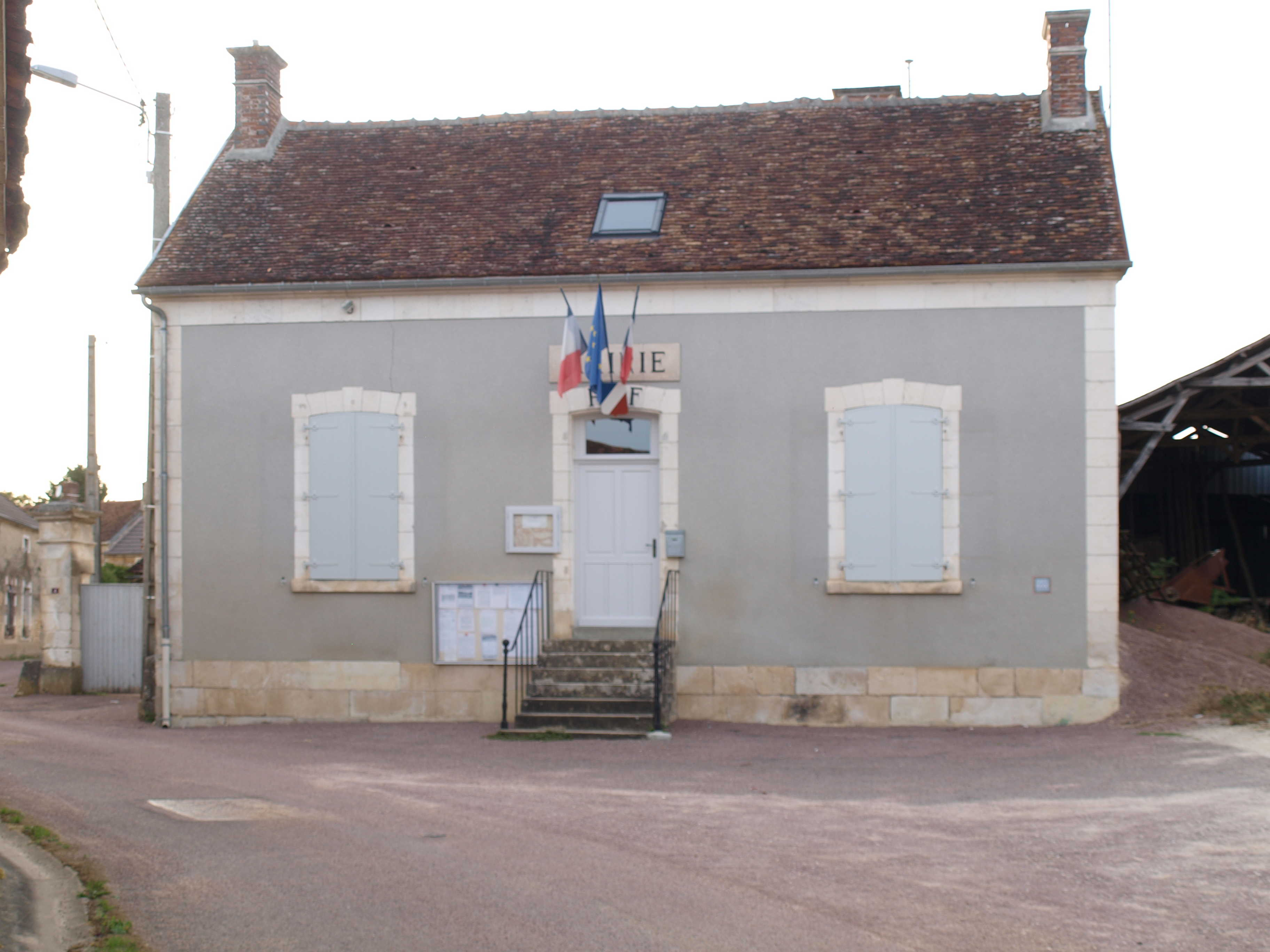
- The town hall in Lain
- Location of Lain
- Location within France Location within Bourgogne-Franche-Comté
- Coordinates: 47°37′08″N 3°20′44″E
- Country: France
- Region: Bourgogne-Franche-Comté
- Department: Yonne
- Arrondissement: Auxerre
- Canton: Vincelles
- Area^{1}: 10.18 km^{2} (3.93 sq mi)
- Highest elevation: 316 m (1,037 ft)
- Lowest elevation: 217 m (712 ft)
- Population (2023): 172
  - Density: 16.9/km^{2} (43.8/sq mi)
- Time zone: UTC+01:00 (CET)
  - Summer (DST): UTC+02:00 (CEST)
- INSEE/Postal code: 89215 /89560
- ^{1} French Land Register data, which excludes lakes, ponds, glaciers > 1 km^{2} (0.386 sq mi or 247 acres) and river estuaries.

Lain (French pronunciation: [lɛ̃]) is a commune in the Yonne department in Bourgogne-Franche-Comté in north-central France, in the natural region of Forterre.

== See also ==
- Communes of the Yonne department
