= Pouillé (ecclesiastical register) =

A pouillé is an enumeration of all ecclesiastical benefices located in a given geographical area. There can be a pouillé of a parish, an abbey, a deanery, a diocese, etc. The pouillé is established for the assessment and collection of tax and charges and may include the revenues of profits, the number of taxpayers or even the complete list of these parties with the amounts paid.

In some cases, we call a pouillé a register in which are transcribed acts affecting a church building, abbey, etc. and the description of the property.

Sometimes the term polyptych is used.

General pouillés include all the archbishops and bishops of the kingdom or state.
