= Experimental archaeology =

Archaeological sub-discipline

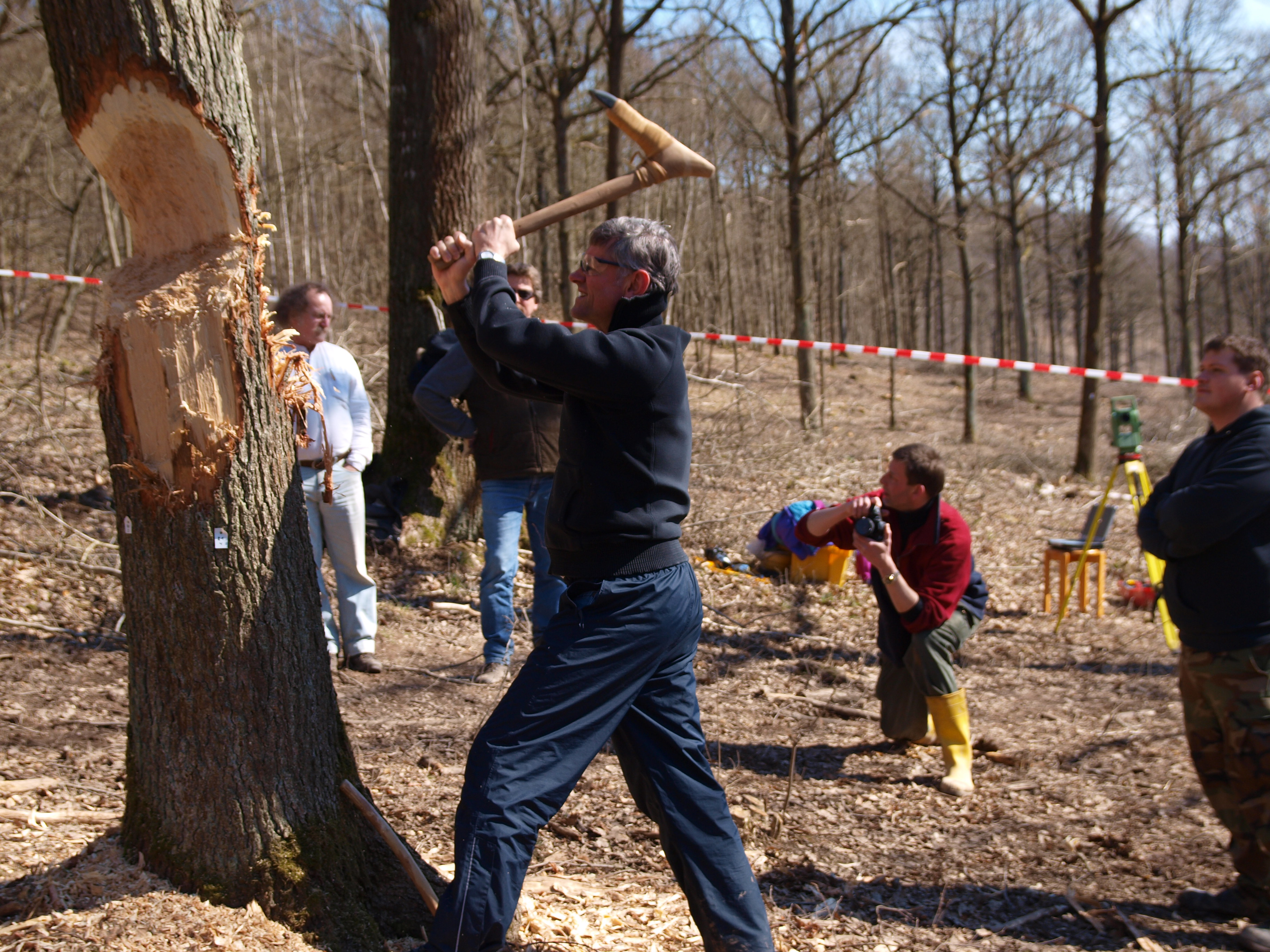
Experimental tree felling with reconstructed adzes of the Linear Pottery culture for the analysis of stress marks on the adze blades and ghost lines on the tree stump and the timber in comparison with marks on archaeological finds

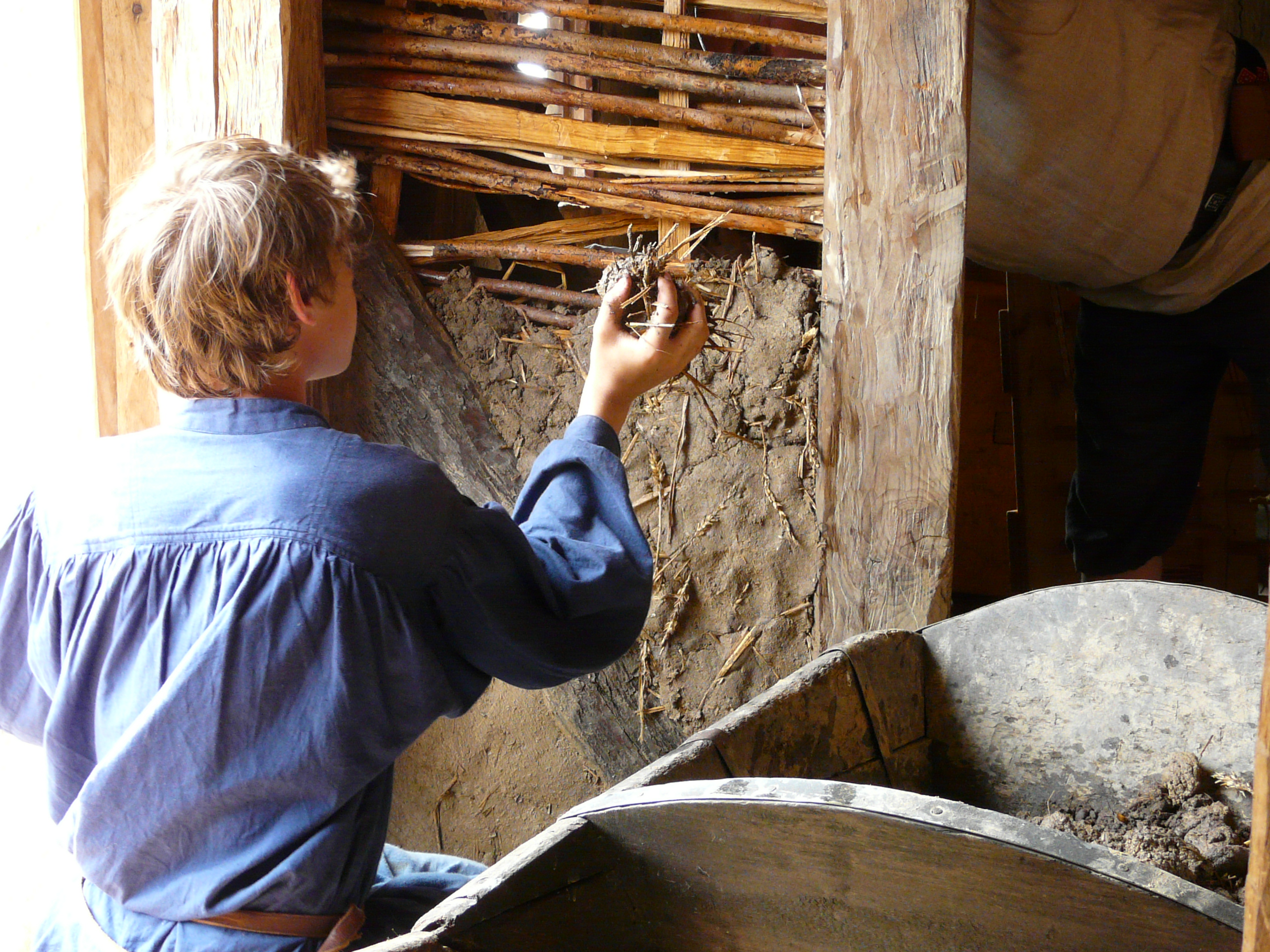
Creating a wall of mud in the Viking style.

Experimental archaeology is a subfield of archaeology which attempts to test archaeological hypotheses, usually by replicating or approximating the feasibility of ancient cultures performing various tasks or feats.

It is distinct from uses of primitive technology without any concern for archaeological or historical study. Living history and historical reenactment, which are generally undertaken as hobbies, are non-archaeological counterparts of this academic discipline.

One of the main forms of experimental archaeology is the creation of copies of historical structures using only historically accurate technology. Experimental archaeology has been featured in several television productions, such as BBC's "Building the Impossible" and the PBS's Secrets of Lost Empires. Among notable experiments were the attempts to recreate several of Leonardo da Vinci's designs from his sketchbooks, such as his 15th century armed fighting vehicle.

== Examples ==
=== Butser Ancient Farm ===
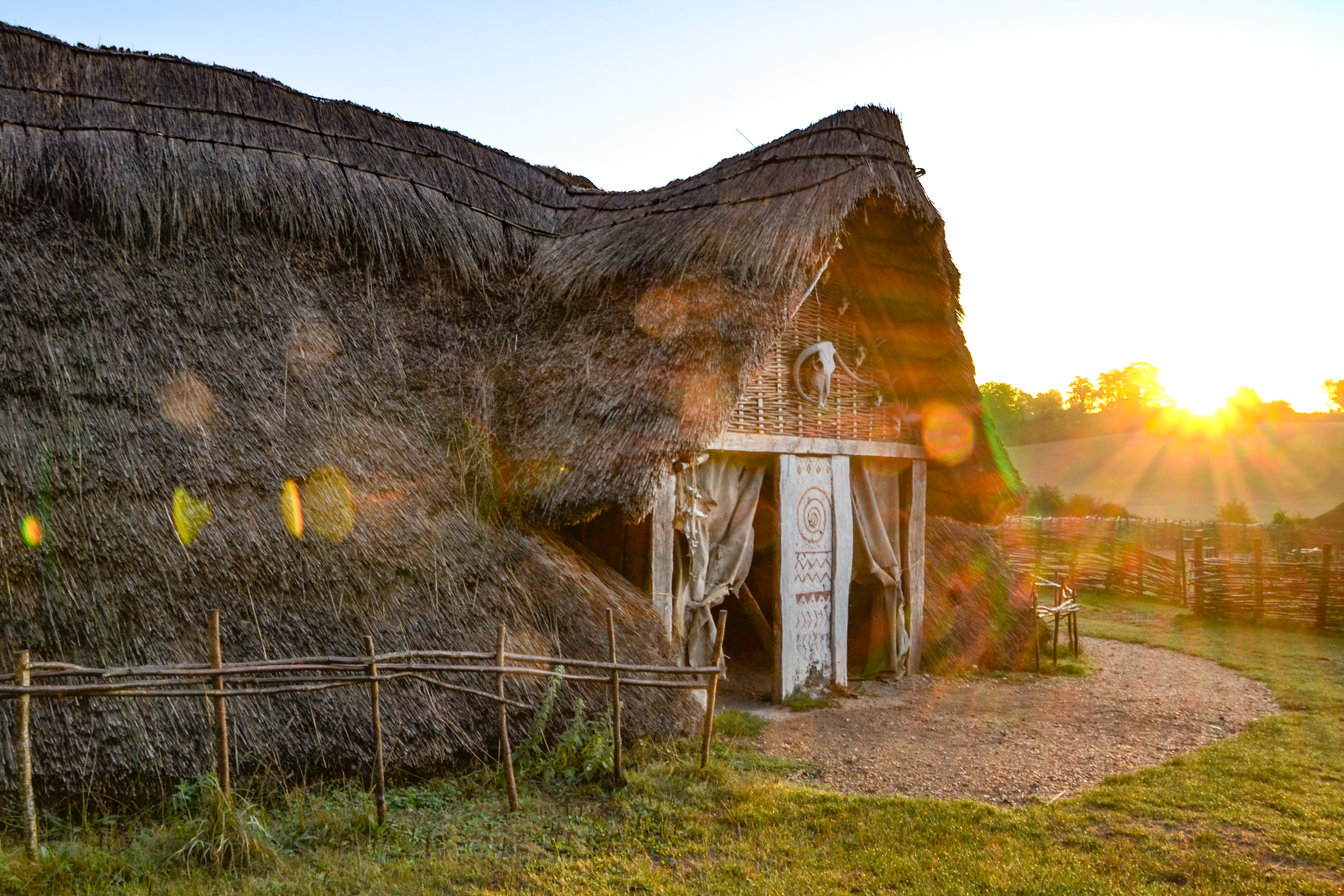
Butser Ancient Farm's reconstruction of a Stone Age house found in Hampshire, UK.

One of the earliest examples is Butser Ancient Farm, which recreates buildings from UK archaeology to test theories of construction, use, and materials. Today, the site features a working Stone Age farm, a Bronze Age roundhouse, Iron Age village, Roman villa, and Saxon long halls. The work carried out at Butser has been instrumental in establishing experimental archaeology as a legitimate archaeological discipline, as well as assisted in bringing study of prehistory to the UK school curriculum.

Butser still carries out long-term experiments in prehistoric agriculture, animal husbandry, and manufacturing to test ideas posited by archaeologists, as well as introducing visitors to the discipline.

=== Lejre Land of Legends ===
Another early example is the Lejre Land of Legends, the oldest open-air museum in Denmark. The site features reconstructed buildings from the Stone Age, Iron Age, Viking era, and 19th century, and runs experiments on prehistoric living and technologies.

=== Other examples ===
- The Kon-Tiki expedition (1947), a balsa raft built by Thor Heyerdahl, sailed from Peru to Polynesia to demonstrate the possibility of cultural exchange between South America and the Polynesian islands.
- Attempts to transport large stones like those used in Stonehenge over short distances using only technology that would have been available at the time. The original stones were probably moved from Pembrokeshire to the site on Salisbury Plain.
- Since the 1970s the re-construction of timber framed buildings has informed understanding of early Anglo Saxon buildings at West Stow, Suffolk, England. This extensive program of research through experiment and experience continues today.
- The reconstruction of part of Hadrian's Wall at Vindolanda, carried out in limited time by local volunteers.
- Greek triremes have been reconstructed by skilled sailors from plans and archaeological remains and have been successfully tried at sea.
- Attempts to manufacture steel that matches all the characteristics of Damascus steel, whose original manufacturing techniques have been lost for centuries, including computational fluid dynamics reconstructions by the University of Exeter of the Sri Lanka furnaces at Samanalawewa, thought to be the most likely sources for Damascus steel.
- Experiments using reproduction bâtons de commandement as spear throwers.
- Guédelon Castle, a medieval construction project located in Treigny, France.
- Ozark Medieval Fortress, a defunct sister project to Guédelon.
- The Pamunkey Project – Errett Callahan led a series of extended Late Woodland living experiences in Tidewater Virginia.
- The World Atlatl Association, an organization devoted to the use and research of atlatls, helped lobby for the legalization of atlatls as a means of deer hunting in Missouri.
- Marcus Junkelmann constructed Roman devices and gear for various museums. He also tested and analyzed them in various reenactments, among them a group of legionaries in full authentic gear crossing the Alps from Verona to Augsburg.
- Ma'agen Michael II, a replica of a 2,400-year-old merchantman; built by Haifa University and the Israel Antiquities Authority
- Reconstruction of Galileo's Experiment: the inclined plane.
- Reconstruction of Lomonosov's discovery of Venus's atmosphere.
- Construction of a monastic community according to the ninth-century Plan of Saint Gall at Campus Galli.
- Janet Stephens utilizing her own skill as a hairdresser to reconstruct Roman-era hairstyles, rebutting previously held theories about single-prong pins being used to hold them in place.
- Ben Marwick trampled experimentally-produced flaked stone artefacts into sediments excavated from Malakunanja II to show that it was unlikely that they had moved extensively through the deposit during the Pleistocene.
- Killian Driscoll undertook a series of experiments to examine the prehistoric use of vein quartz. This involved experimental knapping to understand the fracture mechanics of the material; the experimental burning of quartz; and an experiment designed to investigate the ease of identification of stone tools made from quartz; this series was added to by an experiment that examined the effects of trampling on quartz tools compared to flint.
- Beginning in the 1980s, a project to build an Iron Age Roundhouse was led by a teacher at Cranborne Middle School. In 2002, the site was expanded into the Cranborne Ancient Technology Centre with an additional Viking Longhouse and Neolithic dwellings that are all used for educational purposes.
- At University College Dublin, Ireland, the Centre for Experimental Archaeology and Material Culture (founded 2012) is one of the only university campus facilities of this type for experimental archaeological research and teaching in the world. Their work has involved Mesolithic, early medieval and Viking Age houses, pottery, stone, flint, chert, and quartz technologies; bronze, iron and glass-working; and food production.
- Sutton Hoo Ships Company based in Woodbridge, Suffolk, UK is a 4-year project to build a full size reconstruction of the Sutton Hoo burial ship excavated by Basil Brown at Sutton Hoo in 1939. The reconstruction process is attempting to discover and use traditional boat building skills and methods that might have been used by the Anglo Saxon shipbuilders of the time.
- The YouTube channel Clickspring documents the creation of an Antikythera mechanism replica using the tools, techniques of machining and metallurgy, and materials that would have been available in ancient Greece, along with investigations into the possible technologies of the era.

== Variations ==
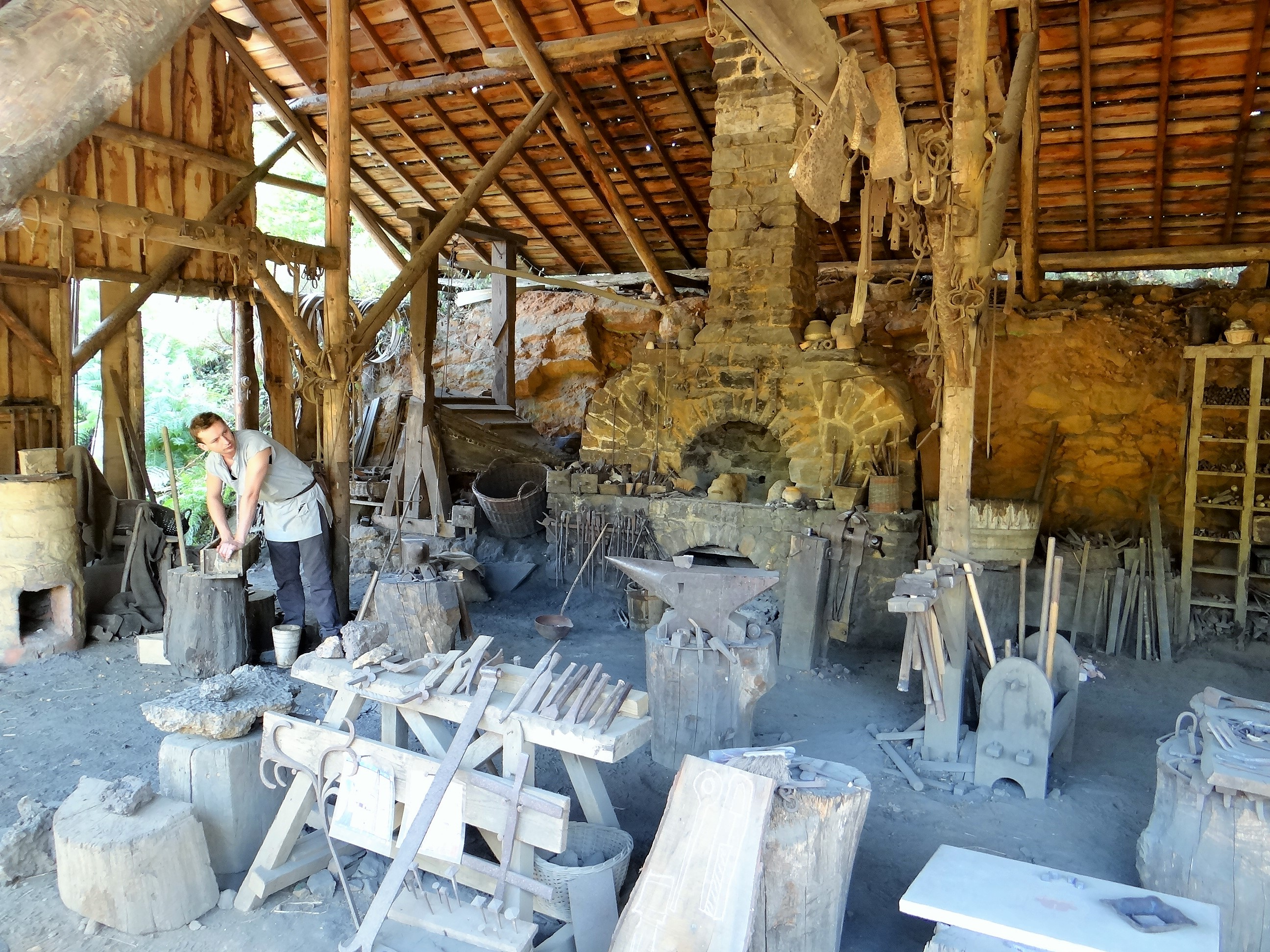
Experimental medieval forge

Other types of experimental archaeology may involve burying modern replica artifacts and ecofacts for varying lengths of time to analyse the post-depositional effects on them. Other archaeologists have built modern earthworks and measured the effects of silting in the ditches and weathering and subsidence on the banks to understand better how ancient monuments would have looked. One example is Overton Down in England.

The work of flintknappers is also a kind of experimental archaeology as much has been learnt about the many different types of flint tools through the hands-on approach of actually making them. Experimental archaeologists have equipped modern professional butchers, archers and lumberjacks with replica flint tools to judge how effective they would have been for certain tasks. Use wear traces on the modern flint tools are compared to similar traces on archaeological artifacts, making probability hypotheses on the possible kind of use feasible. Hand axes have been shown to be particularly effective at cutting animal meat from the bone and jointing it.

Another field of experimental archaeology is illustrated by the studies of the stone flaking abilities of humans ("novice knapper" studies) and of non-human primates. In the latter case it has been shown that, after human demonstrations, enculturated bonobos are able to produce modified cores and flaked stones which are morphologically similar to early lithic industries in East Africa.

Historians working on costume and fashion have made reconstructions of garments, including farthingales, which can give a better understanding of clothing types and textile crafts known only from archival records or depictions in portraits.

== In popular culture ==
The subject has proven popular enough to spawn several re-creation-type television shows:

- The 1978 BBC TV series Living in the Past re-created life in an Iron Age village with 15 volunteers over a period of 13 months.
- Discovery Channel's I, Caveman and I, Caveman : The Great Hunt
- Channel 4's Time Team
- Discovery Channel's The Colony seasons 1 and 2 showed aspects of experimental archaeology
- Discovery Channel's MythBusters often conduct experimental archaeology to test the capability of mythical ancient weapons, including Archimedes' death ray and the tree cannon, as well as testing the capabilities of known weapons including the hwacha, wood vs. stone arrowheads, and the effects of cannonballs and splintering.
- The BBC has several re-creation farm series, including Tudor Monastery Farm, Tales from the Green Valley, Victorian Farm, Edwardian Farm, and Wartime Farm.
- BBC Two has a series on the construction of Guédelon Castle: Secrets of the Castle.
- UK based experimental archaeologist James Dilley of AncientCraft and the University of Southampton researches the production of tools and artefacts from the Palaeolithic to late Bronze Age. As well as demonstrating his findings frequently on TV programs, his work is on display in the British Museum and Stonehenge. His recent work is exploring hunting strategies of Upper Palaeolithic people in Europe and Bronze Age copper-alloy mould use.

== See also ==
- Experimental archaeometallurgy
- Reverse engineering
- Performance archaeology
- Butser Ancient Farm
- Historical reconstruction
