= Secrets of the Castle =

2014 BBC documentary series

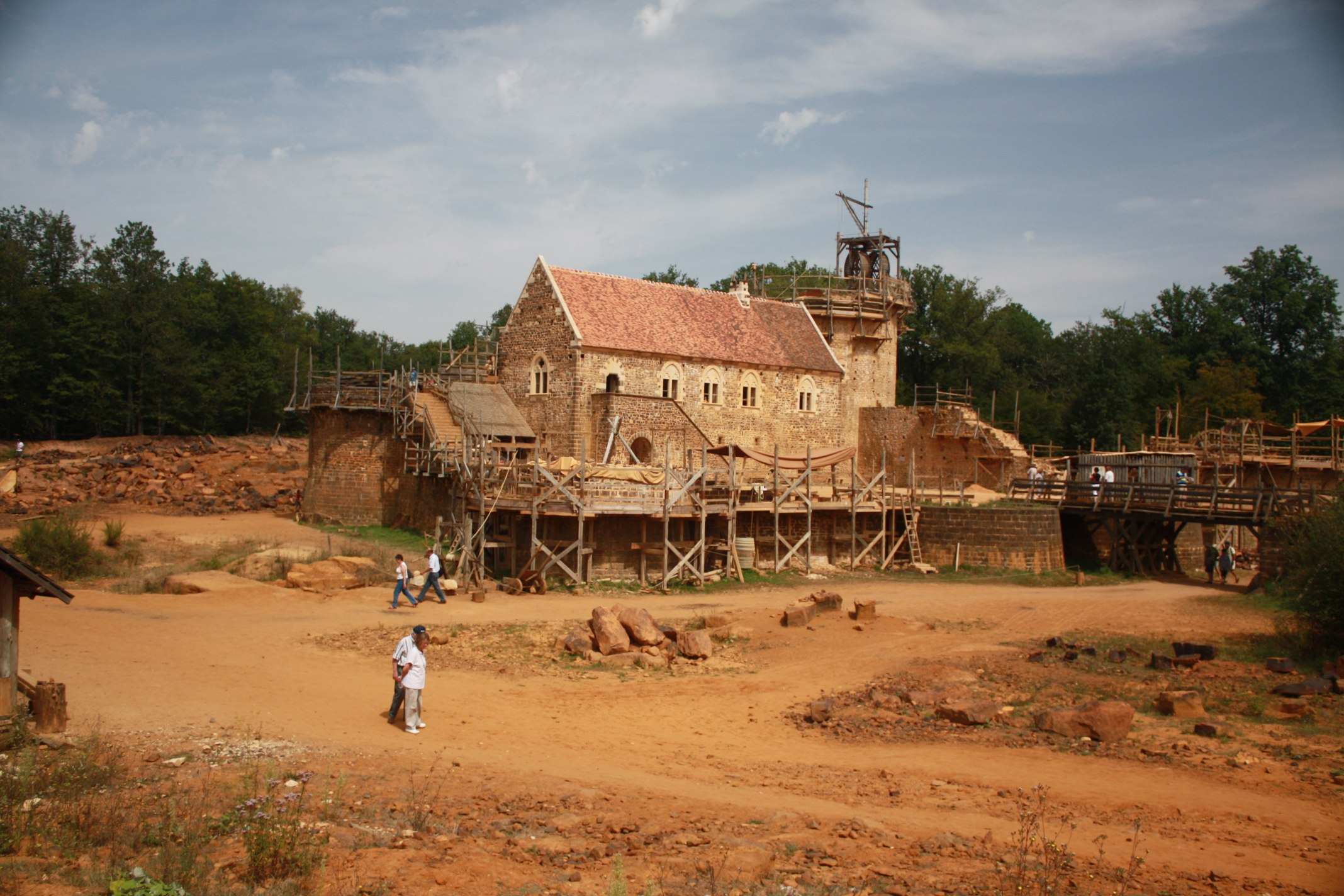
- Also known as: Secrets of the Castle with Ruth, Peter and Tom
- Genre: Factual
- Directed by: Blythe Tinker; Stuart Elliott; Lindsay Hill; Giulia Clark
- Starring: Peter Ginn; Ruth Goodman; Tom Pinfold
- Narrated by: Paul McGann
- Composers: Matthew Winch; Andy Hamilton
- Country of origin: United Kingdom
- Original language: English
- No. of series: 1
- No. of episodes: 5 (list of episodes)

Production
- Executive producer: David Upshal
- Production locations: Guédelon Castle, Treigny, France
- Running time: 60 minutes
- Production company: Lion Television

Original release
- Network: BBC Two; BBC Two HD
- Release: 18 November – 17 December 2014

Related
- Tales from the Green Valley; Victorian Farm; Victorian Pharmacy; Edwardian Farm; Wartime Farm; Tudor Monastery Farm; Full Steam Ahead

Secrets of the Castle, or Secrets of the Castle with Ruth, Peter and Tom is a British factual television series that first broadcast on BBC Two from 18 November to 17 December 2014. The series stars archaeologists Peter Ginn and Tom Pinfold, and historian Ruth Goodman. In the series, the team takes part in the medieval construction project at Guédelon Castle in Treigny, France. During their stay there, they reveal what kind of skills and crafts were needed to build a castle in the 13th century, by using the techniques, tools and materials of the era.

== Location ==
The castle construction site shown in the series is Guédelon Castle in France, a 25-year experimental archaeology project where a castle is being built using only the techniques, tools and materials from the Middle Ages, ie. without electricity or modern power tools.

== Episode list ==
No.	Title	Directed by	Original release date	UK viewers (millions)
1	"Why Build A Castle?"	Stuart Elliott	18 November 2014	1.58
The team arrives at Guédelon, in the Burgundy region of France, to join the world’s biggest archaeological experiment - a 25 year project to build a medieval castle from scratch, using only the tools and materials available in the 13th century.
2	"Defending The Castle"	Blythe Tinker	25 November 2014	1.89
Ruth, Peter and Tom look at the ingenious features medieval castle-builders came up with to withstand attack from an ever more formidable array of siege engines.
3	"Inside The Castle"	Lindsay Hill	2 December 2014	1.70
Ruth, Peter and Tom enter the surprisingly colourful world of medieval interior design. The castles that we see today are in fact scarred by centuries of decay. Most of their original roofs, carpentry and interior finishes have long since disappeared, but in their heyday they were lavishly decorated.
4	"The Castle’s Community of Skills"	Blythe Tinker	9 December 2014	1.65
The team delve deeper into the secrets of the skilled communities who built medieval castles. The stonemasons working on the castle walls are dependent on blacksmiths, whose metalwork was magical to the medieval mind-set.
5	"Beyond The Castle Walls"	Giulia Clark	17 December 2014	1.78
Ruth, Peter and Tom look at the castle’s place in the wider medieval world. 13th century Europe was a busy, developing, connected place, where work, trade, pilgrimages and Crusades gave people the opportunity to travel across the continent and beyond.

== See also ==
- BBC historic farm series
  - Tales from the Green Valley
  - Victorian Farm
  - Edwardian Farm
  - Wartime Farm
  - Tudor Monastery Farm
- Victorian Pharmacy
