= Wartime Farm =

British historical documentary TV series (2012)

- Directed by: Stuart Elliott; Naomi Benson
- Starring: Peter Ginn; Ruth Goodman; Alex Langlands
- Narrated by: John Simm
- Country of origin: United Kingdom
- No. of episodes: 8 + 1 (Christmas Special)

Production
- Producer: David Upshal
- Running time: 1 hour per episode

Original release
- Network: BBC Two
- Release: 6 September 2012

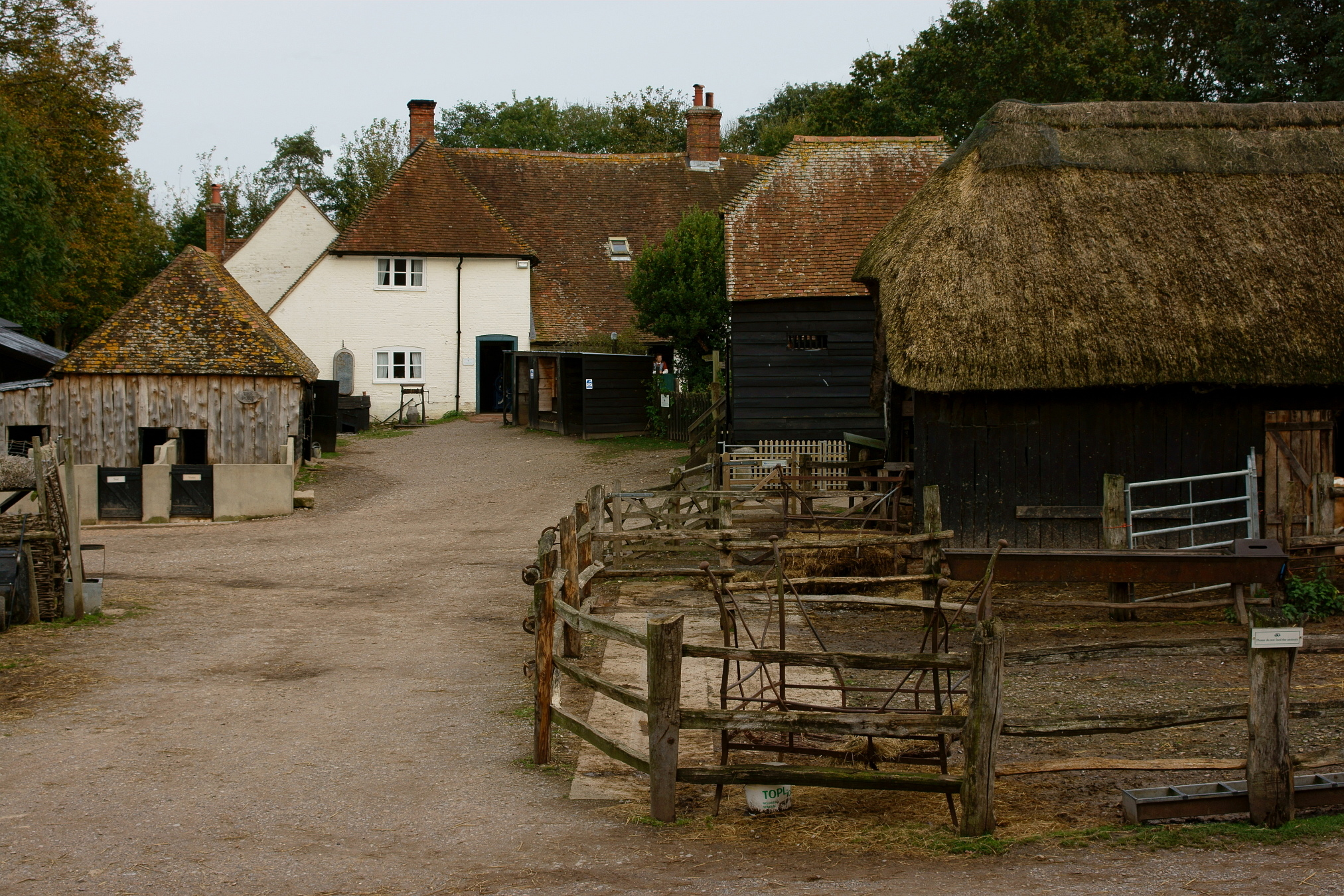
Manor Farm, Botley, the setting for Wartime Farm

Wartime Farm is a British historical documentary TV series in eight parts in which the running of a farm during the Second World War is reenacted, first broadcast on BBC Two on 6 September 2012. The series, the fourth in the historic farm series, following the original, Tales from the Green Valley, was made for the BBC by independent production company Lion Television in association with the Open University, and was filmed at Manor Farm Country Park, now Manor Farm and River Hamble Country Park respectively, close to Southampton. The farming team consisted of historian Ruth Goodman, and archaeologists Alex Langlands and Peter Ginn. The Wartime Farm commissioning executives for the BBC are Emma Willis and James Hayes, and the Executive Producer for Lion Television is David Upshal.

An associated book by Langlands, Ginn and Goodman—Wartime Farm: Rediscovering the Skills and Spirit of World War II—was published in 2012. In addition, a free booklet was made available to viewers in the UK and Ireland, by the Open University.

== The team ==
Goodman, Ginn and Langlands began their collaboration with Tales from the Green Valley (2005), a programme exploring life on a small farm in Gray Hill, Monmouthshire, Wales, in the 17th century. They lived for a full calendar year as 1880s tenants on the Shropshire estate of Acton Scott in the programme Victorian Farm (January 2009), followed by Victorian Farm Christmas (December 2009), which picks up the narrative a year later. The historians went to Morwellham Quay in Devon for Edwardian Farm (2010). Tudor Monastery Farm (2013) explored what farming was like near the end of the reign of Henry VII, at the Weald and Downland Open Air Museum. They explored 13th-century life and work in Secrets of the Castle (2014), filmed at Guédelon Castle in Treigny, France. Victorian Pharmacy (2010), on which Goodman was a presenter, is sometimes listed as part of these documentaries.

== Episodes ==
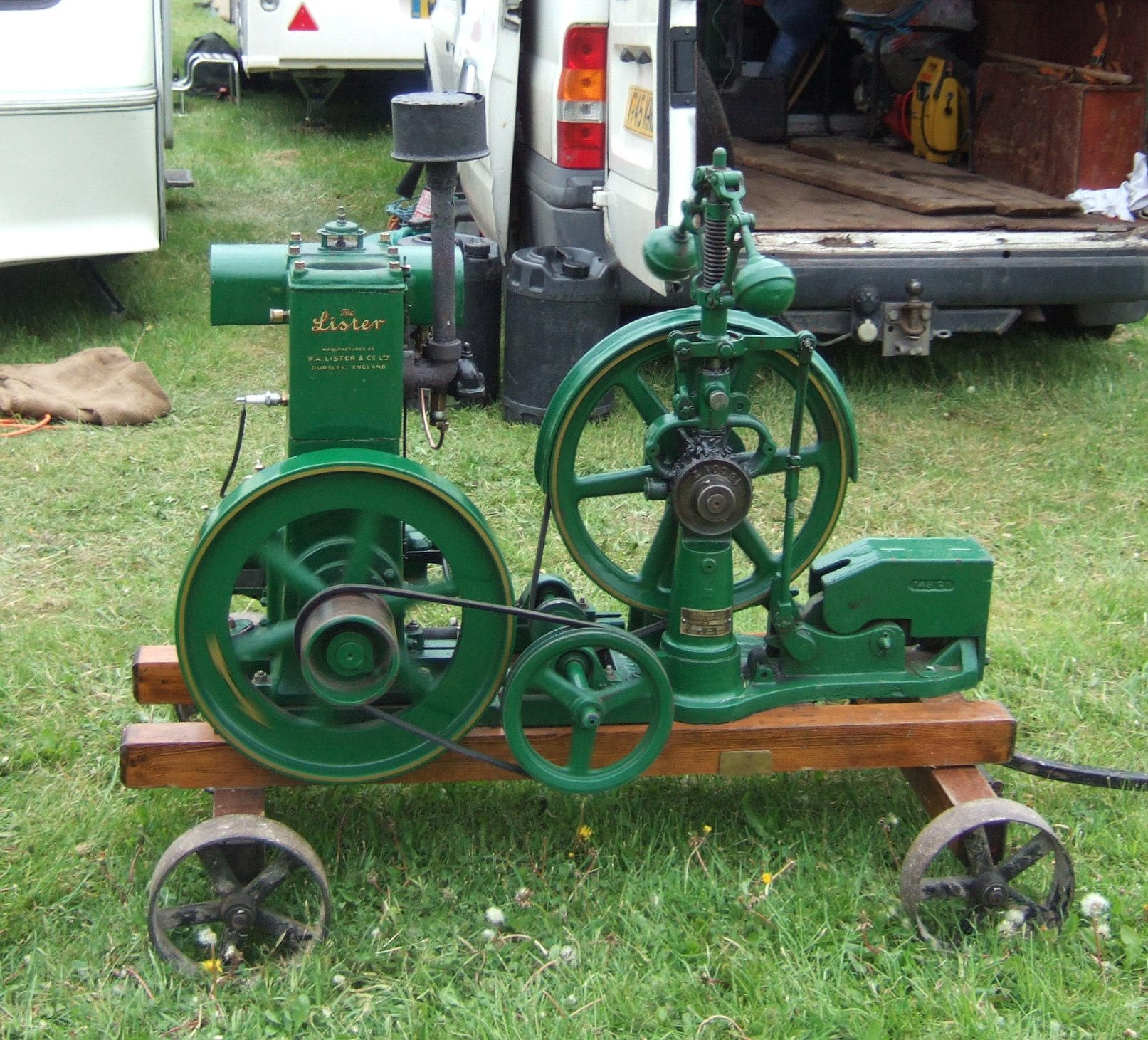
Lister D engine

No.	Title	Original air date (8pm)
1	"Spring 1940"	6 September 2012
First broadcast on BBC Two and BBC HD on Thursday 6 September 2012 at 8pm. As with the previous series, the first episode begins with the team moving into a cottage on a farm, this time in Hampshire. With a second European war looming on the horizon, the team set about making a number of improvements to the farm. The installation of electric lighting via a generator driven by a Lister D engine allows them to work later into the evenings, while household labour-savers like a Hoosier cabinet, paraffin range cooker, electric clothes iron and linoleum flooring mean Ruth can spend more time aiding the war effort and less time on household chores. Alex and Peter, meanwhile, set about constructing a mole subsoiler from scrap farming equipment, to drain their waterlogged clay fields. However, with time running out and their improvised subsoiler literally buckling under pressure, they are forced to plough and sow through the night without draining the field, despite warnings from the local "war ag" over potential water damage. In addition to running the farm, the team are soon recruited into the government's secret Auxiliary Units. Alex and Peter are introduced to guerrilla fighting tactics in late night training sessions, while Ruth relays top secret messages for the Special Duty Sections from her potting shed. The situation becomes all the more serious as war is officially declared and, soon after, France falls under German occupation. Winston Churchill's "Fight on the Beaches" broadcast and an unwelcome visit from the ARP warden see the episode end on a sombre note, as the team take stock of the huge undertaking ahead of them.
2	"Autumn 1940"	13 September 2012
The second episode focuses around food rationing and preparations for the winter of 1940. Under growing pressure from the Ministry of Agriculture and the Ministry of Food, the team has to make tough decisions over which livestock (if any) the farm should continue to rear. While the pigs, sheep and beef herd are removed, and the oldest chickens slaughtered and turned into feather dusters, Ruth manages to keep two pigs on as part of a "Pig Club" with their neighbours. Alex and Peter spend much of the episode generating silage to feed their remaining animals over winter. They first obtain sugar beet tops and nettles as raw materials, and then construct a small silo out of corrugated steel, with the help of two volunteers from the Women's Land Army (Nicola Verdon and Caroline Bressey). Ruth, meanwhile, explores the beginnings of rationing, and uses the family's meagre meat ration, and a bounty of vegetables and foraged mushrooms, to make stew in an improvised haybox. Rationing leads her to investigate the black market, as she and a shady visitor filter red diesel using a loaf of bread, and get familiar with a butcher who sells spare chops under the counter. A radio broadcast about the sinking of HMS Jervis Bay puts Ruth's black market flutter into perspective, and she instead decides to spend her time working with the local Women's Institute to pick and preserve fruit and vegetables, using a novel hand-operated canning machine from the United States. The episode ends with Ruth and the WI members giving a rendition of the official Women's Land Army anthem, Back to the Land.
3	"Winter 1940"	20 September 2012
With German air raids causing unprecedented damage to Britain's major cities in the winter of 1940, the residents of Manor Farm are instructed to make preparations for an influx of evacuees from London, Portsmouth and Southampton. Alex and Peter spend the first half of the episode casting and firing their own roof tiles, to make some of the farm's outbuildings suitable for human habitation. Despite the freezing November temperatures, their makeshift kiln must burn at over 900 °C (1,650 °F) for two days and two nights, requiring constant supervision. Fortunately, the residual heat provides an ideal input for some 'medicinal' home distillation of apples into hooch cider. Ruth, meanwhile, sets about furnishing the barns—first with wooden beds, and then with padded patchwork quilts made from feathers and ticking. The team must also do their bit to defend Hampshire against German aerial bombardment. Ruth spends an evening with a veteran of the Royal Observer Corps, learning how to track enemy aircraft and relay their locations back to the control centre in Winchester. In the woodland further away from the farm, Alex and Peter construct decoy fire beacons to lure enemy bombers away from Southampton, as part of Operation Starfish. The episode ends with a celebration of Christmas, Britain's first since the introduction of rationing in January that year. The farm is adorned with decorations made from paper, holly and a glitter-like substance made from epsom salts, while Alex secretly makes a toy Supermarine Spitfire out of spare tin cans. Ruth's murkey, or mock turkey (made from vegetables and sausage meat) goes down well at dinner, not least with Henry, the Border Collie farmyard dog.
4	"1941"	27 September 2012
As Europe falls to the Germans and British trade vessels are diverted to send supplies to the Soviets, the British government tightens its grip on farms like Manor Farm, expecting more and more home-grown food, drink and clothing. This week, Ruth, Alex and Peter do their best to impress an inspector from the local "War Ag", who is tasked with surveying their abilities and grading them as an "A", "B" or "C" farm. Farmers with low grades were in serious danger of penalties, or even total loss of their farms. With the help of a new Field Marshall tractor and a team of Percheron draught horses, the team sow flax on their spare field, at the recommendation of the War Ag inspector. It is also time to start milking the dairy herd, using an early vacuum milking machine. Since the herd's feed makes a noticeable difference to the quality of their milk, Alex and Peter finally begin to use the silage they produced in Episode 2. Spurred on by a promotional film from the Ministry of Information, Peter starts a rabbit concern with the dual aim of impressing the War Ag and efficiently producing extra meat for the family and for Britain. Ruth, meanwhile, creates cottage cheese from gone-off milk, and employs a pre-war hand-cranked washing machine to help with the daily chores.
5	"1942"	4 October 2012
Broadcast on 4 October 2012 at 8pm. It is 1942 and the team face running the farm under increasing food and fuel shortages. The Ministry of Food has demanded an extra 840,000 tonnes of wheat be produced and, to do their part, Alex and Peter lease specialist equipment from the wartime government to turn every last scrap of ground into arable land. They also construct a 'Horse Gin' to slice swede, and convert a 1930s petrol-powered ambulance to run on gas from an onboard coal furnace. This leads Alex on to discover where Britain's wartime coal supplies came from, as he experiences life down the mines as a Bevin boy. Ruth, meanwhile, joins the Women's Timber Corps with her daughter, Eve. Together they fell, sned and measure up a tree for the war effort. They also meet a veteran 'Lumber Jill' from the 1940s, who expresses her enjoyment of the camaraderie and work ethic of the Corps, despite the hard work. 'Shorty', the pig raised by Ruth's Pig Club from Episode 2, has fattened up over the last six months, and is ready for slaughter. Half of the pork is split between the club members, and half is donated, as required, to the government. Ruth follows its progress right to the dinner tables of a British Restaurant (or "emergency food centre"), as she serves the boiled pork, alongside boiled onions, baked beans, with a white sauce, and plum duff for pudding, for local air raid victims and evacuees.
6	"1943"	11 October 2012
By 1943, food imports had slumped to their lowest levels during the war, and farmland was becoming tired after years of consecutive use. To combat this, Ruth creates fertiliser with dung and spare straw from the farm's cereal production, while Alex employs a specialist rat catcher to stop rodents eating into the upcoming harvest. Later in the episode, Alex and Peter build a straw-bale outhouse for visitors and evacuees, complete with a thatched nettle roof; harvest grass from the local churchyard to make hay for their dairy herd; and start their own bee-keeping concern. Ruth, desperate for helping hands, takes up a new initiative from the Ministry of Labour to employ children on the farm. They camp in the woods nearby, and pick herbs and medicinal plants like goose grass and foxglove which can be sold on to Britain's pharmaceutical industry. She prepares sandwiches for them using steamed tinned salmon from Canada, and organises entertainment from a local folk musician, including the wartime favourite "Run, Rabbit, Run". The adults, too, get a chance to let their hair down, at a fund-raising dance for Wings for Victory Week. Ruth makes her own dress out of cotton flour sacks (purposefully designed, she says, to be re-used by industrious housewives), and curls her hair using sugar water. Alex and Ruth learn about Jive and Swing dancing from the Black American soldiers at the party, while Peter spends the night outside bringing in the hay.
7	"1944"	18 October 2012
It is 1944, and a turning point for the Allies in World War II. Manor Farm's flax field—a crop heavily used by the military—has suffered in the unusually wet summer of 2012. Alex and Peter try to reinvigorate it using ammonium nitrate, a chemical fertiliser, but the rain does not let up. It remains so wet, in fact, that Alex has to re-waterproof his coat, using linseed oil, paraffin and beeswax from the colony he started in Episode 6. Ruth, meanwhile, has been constructing a willow basket to hold carrier pigeon, used to send messages throughout the war, and often trained by farmers. Alex and Peter train some pigeons by releasing them from a 1930s fishing boat which saw service in World War II in the English Channel—and within half an hour, the birds have completed the 30 mile journey back to their loft. Without irony, Ruth serves wood pigeon 'salad' for lunch, set in gelatine and accompanied by grated carrot, grated beetroot and small boiled fingerling potatoes. The farm later hosts to Leo Stevenson, explaining the role of an official war artist. Such artists were employed by the Ministry of Information to document the real experience of war on British soil. He interviews the local pigeon fancier on his memories of the preparation for D-Day in Southampton, and produces a detailed painting of Ruth, Alex and Peter working the land while German Messerschmitt Bf 110 and RAF Hurricane aircraft hurtle overhead. With their own flax crop ruined by rain and poor drainage, Alex and Peter help harvest a neighbouring farmer's crop. Alongside them work a group of Italian and German prisoners of war (POWs). They are also guided around the remains of a local military camp, HMS Cricket. Later that week, Ruth joins them to re-enact a baseball game that was played on the same spot, in 1944, between local farmers, POWs and American military personnel. The episode ends with Alex singing and playing As The Boys Come Back From War on his ukulele, for the troops, following in the footsteps of past ENSA entertainers such as George Formby, Tommy Cooper, Laurence Olivier and Spike Milligan.
8	"1945"	25 October 2012
In this final episode, the team faces a harvest under the conditions of summer 1945. Five years of constant farming have degraded the quality of Britain's fields, threatening crop yields. The team attempt to reinvigorate their land with a tractor-driven muck spreader, and with cows themselves. The team soon hear about the Allies' conquest of Berlin, and on 7 May 1945, the end of World War II in Europe. With the danger of aerial bombardment resolved, they instantly remove Manor Farm's blackout precautions, and set about planning a Victory in Europe Day party. Rationing is still in force, so Ruth tries a potato-based cake recipe from the Women's Institute and sweetens it with 'mock' orange juice made from swede. Ruth, Alex and Peter talk to VE Day veterans who give their accounts of the end of the war in the countryside. As summer progresses, and victory is announced in the Pacific, Alex and Peter call in a brand new invention, the combine harvester, to make light work of their wheat crop. The grain is too damp, however, so they improvise a grain dryer from bricks, scrap metal and recently dismantled concrete from local road checkpoints and defences. With the end of the war, and the end of a successful harvest, the team plans a final celebration to mark their time at Manor Park. They hold a "Holidays at Home" party, with pilchard and cabbage sandwiches, outdoor games, the hokey cokey, and a firework elephant. As Ruth, Alex and Peter leave Manor Farm for the last time, they reminisce over the last year, and express their respect for the farmers and their families who ploughed on during the war.

== Related programme ==
Wartime Farm, Christmas Special was broadcast on BBC Two and BBC HD on 18 December 2012. The 60-minute programme recreated the conditions of Christmas 1944 and was presented by Ruth Goodman and Peter Ginn.

== Ratings ==
No.	Title	Original air date	Total viewers (millions)	BBC2 Weekly Ranking
1	"Spring 1940"	6 September 2012	2.69	2
2	"Autumn 1940"	13 September 2012	2.70	2
3	"Winter 1940"	20 September 2012	2.68	2
4	"1941"	27 September 2012	2.77	5
5	"1942"	4 October 2012	2.43	4
6	"1943"	11 October 2012	2.79	4
7	"1944"	18 October 2012	2.84	3
8	"1945"	25 October 2012	2.83	3
