= Full Steam Ahead =

Full Steam Ahead is a command to move forward at maximum speed. It may also refer to:

- Full Steam Ahead, an alternate title to 1936 British film Full Speed Ahead, directed by Lawrence Huntington
- Full Steam Ahead (film), a 1951 Hungarian film directed by Félix Máriássy
- Full Steam Ahead, a 2016 British educational TV series starring Ruth Goodman, Alex Langlands, and Peter Ginn
