= Hot toddy (disambiguation) =

Hot toddy is a mixed drink, usually including alcohol, that is served hot.

Hot toddy may also refer to:

- "Hot Toddy", a song by Ralph Flanagan & Herb Hendler
- "Hot Toddy", a 1974 song by Nino Ferrer

== See also ==
- "Hot Tottie", Toddy coffee or cold brew coffee, the process of steeping coffee grounds in room temperature water for an extended period
- Palm wine or Toddy, an alcoholic beverage created from palm tree sap
- "Hotty Toddy", an Ole Miss Rebels football cheer
