= Tudor Monastery Farm =

British factual television show (2013)

- Genre: Factual
- Starring: Peter Ginn; Ruth Goodman; Tom Pinfold
- Narrated by: Geraldine James
- Country of origin: United Kingdom
- Original language: English
- No. of series: 1
- No. of episodes: 6 (list of episodes)

Production
- Producer: David Upshal
- Running time: 60 minutes
- Production company: Lion Television

Original release
- Network: BBC Two; BBC Two HD
- Release: 13 November – 18 December 2013

Related
- Tales From The Green Valley; A Tudor Feast at Christmas; Victorian Farm; Victorian Pharmacy; Edwardian Farm; Wartime Farm; Secrets of the Castle; Full Steam Ahead

Tudor Monastery Farm is a British factual television series, first broadcast on BBC Two on 13 November 2013. The series, the fifth in the historic farm series, following the original, Tales from the Green Valley, stars archaeologists Peter Ginn and Tom Pinfold, and historian Ruth Goodman. The team discover what farming was like during the Tudor period at the Weald and Downland Open Air Museum. The programme also features other historians, such as Colin Richards (an expert on rural crafts), and Ronald Hutton (who specialises in folklore and religious beliefs). Harrowing of the fields was carried out by the last remaining team of working oxen in the country.

== Production ==
Cast of Tudor Monastery Farm

On 8 August 2013, the BBC announced the series. David Upshal, the executive producer of Lion Television, said: "We are delighted to be continuing with a new Farm series for BBC Two, taking us back to the earliest point in history we have tackled yet. Following the huge success of the Victorian, Edwardian and Wartime Farms, the new series will see us produce our 50th episode in this on-going, immersive living-history adventure." The series was co-commissioned between Martin Davidson and Aaqil Ahmed.

The filming location is the farm at the Weald and Downland Open Air Museum, Sussex.

== Episode list ==
No.	Title	Directed by	Original release date	UK viewers (millions)
1	"Episode 1"	Stuart Elliott	13 November 2013	1.74
The team move in, coppice hazel, build a pig enclosure, commission a guild, plough using oxen, make rushlights, make wattle-and-daub barriers, sow peas and barley using broadcasting, and celebrate religious festivals. They take custody of some Tamworth pigs. They hire workmen to scribe and illuminate documents as well as turn wooden bowls and plates.
2	"Episode 2"	Giulia Clark	20 November 2013	1.80
The team work with sheep: driving, milking and shearing them; make cheese from the milk; sort, grade, card and spin wool. Additional they produce a period cold treatment from herbs, steam-bend wood, and celebrate Whitsun. They take custody of geese and drive them to market. They observe the smelting of iron as well as the weaving and fulling of cloth.
3	"Episode 3"	Stuart Elliott	27 November 2013	1.80
The team wean piglets, cultivate wild yeast, malt barley, make ale and bread, harvest honey and beeswax, dip candles, shave their sheep's hooves, demonstrate period hair care methods, roast lamb, and celebrate both a mass and the midsummer festival. They take custody of a boar to service their sows. They observe the shaping, moulding, and pouring of a bell, learn about period clock mechanisms and observe a wind-powered grain mill.
4	"Episode 4"	Stuart Elliott	4 December 2013	1.72
The team mine, smelt and cast ingots of lead; plait eel baskets and harvest eels; shape stained glass; patronize a pub; pasture their piglets in the forest; paint cloth and manage their garden. Tom sits for a camera obscura portrait.
5	"Episode 5"	Giulia Clark	11 December 2013	1.74
The team launder bed linen, serve as cooks and stewards, calcine and slake lime, build a lime-ash floor, churn, press, and salt butter; sanitize the dairy, plait rushes for floormats, lay and press rag paper; prepare lye from ash; harvest tree hay for the animals; harvest and thresh their pea crop, cook a feast and make brandy. They observe period typesetting, printing and bookbinding.
6	"Episode 6"	Stuart Elliott	18 December 2013	1.71
The team harvest and stook and store their barley; extract salt from brine, celebrate Michaelmas, carve decorative stone, form and decorate floor tiles, produce blackpowder for Roman candle fireworks, a Damson and Bullace Melomel beverage, and perform a mystery play.

=== 2013 Christmas special ===
On 25 November 2013, the BBC announced that Tudor Monastery Farm would have a Christmas special which explored the festive season as part of BBC Two's Christmas scheduling. The episode was broadcast on 31 December 2013 and overnight figures showed that it attracted 1.57 million viewers (8.06% of the viewing audience). Official figures raised the number of viewers to 1.76 million.

== Reception ==
Time Out's Danielle Goldstein gave it three out of five stars and called it "intriguing". Gerard O'Donovan of The Daily Telegraph gave it four out of five stars and said that history had been brought "brilliantly to life on BBC Two". James Alexander Cameron said "Although a little guilty of choosing the National Curriculum-friendly “Tudor” label over “Medieval”,...it remains a rather interesting little programme for a Medievalist Art Historian to have a look at."

== Home media ==
The DVD edition was released on 10 February 2014.
