= Teasmade =

Automatic tea-making machine

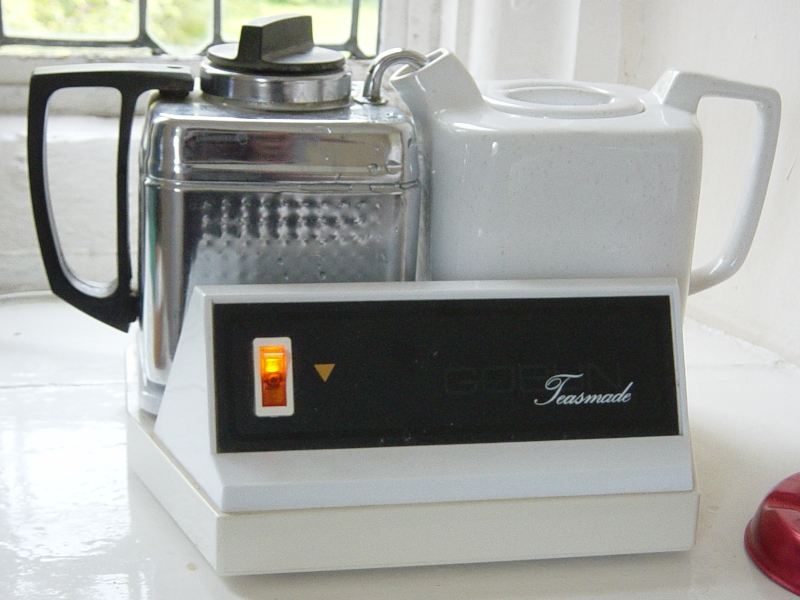
A Goblin Teasmade

A teasmade is a machine for making tea automatically, which was once common in the United Kingdom and some Commonwealth countries. Teasmades generally include an analogue alarm clock and are designed to be used at the bedside, to ensure tea is ready first thing in the morning. Although crude versions existed in Victorian times, they only became practical with the availability of electric versions in the 1930s. They reached their peak in popularity in the 1960s and 1970s. Since then their use has declined, but they started to boast a partial revival in the 2000s, partly as a novelty retro item.

The name teasmade is an example of a genericised trademark, now commonly used to refer to any automatic tea-making appliance.

== History ==
On 19 September 1891, Charles Maynard Walker of Dulwich published details of an "Early Riser's Friend" in Work magazine. The article was detailed and included illustrations, but the teamaker was never patented.

On 17 December 1891, Samuel Rowbottom, of 82 Abbey Road, Derby, applied for a patent for his Automatic Tea Making Apparatus, the patent being granted in 1892. It used a clockwork alarm clock, a gas ring and pilot light. There is a photograph in existence of Rowbottom displaying his Automatic Tea Maker on an exhibition stand. Although there is no evidence that he commercially produced his tea maker, the concept he invented of using the steam from boiling water to force the water out through a tube into the teapot is still in use today.

A teamaker was invented by Albert E. Richardson, an iron turner and fitter from Ashton-under-Lyne. The machine and all rights to it were purchased from Richardson by the Birmingham gunsmith Frank Clarke, for an undisclosed sum. On 7 April 1902, a patent for this tea maker was registered by Clarke. He called it "An Apparatus Whereby a Cup of Tea or Coffee is Automatically Made" and it was later marketed as "A Clock That Makes Tea!".

On 2 May 1932, George Absolom submitted an application for a patent on his invention, an electric automatic tea maker. The patent (number 400672) was passed on 2 November 1933. This invention was manufactured and marketed as the Teesmade.

The word "teesmade" was initiated by Absolom and predates the use of the word "teasmade" by about four years. He applied for a Registered Design using the name Teesmade, but this was not accepted by the Patent Office on the grounds that the unit was not made on the River Tees and that this might confuse the public. Geographic trademarks were invariably refused at this time, and indeed the government passed legislation to forbid them in 1938 (this legislation has since been relaxed). Although the name could not be formally protected, from 1932 Absolom continued to trade as Teesmade Co. Goblin were in no position to object, as the name had the indisputable advantage of prior use.

A similar electric teamaker was patented by William Hermann Brenner Thornton in association with Goblin in 1933, shortly after Absolom's patent. Brenner subsequently sold the patent (414,088 1934) to the British Vacuum Cleaner and Engineering Co. Ltd. who marketed it under the Goblin Teasmade name. This was one of the first successful commercial automatic tea makers.

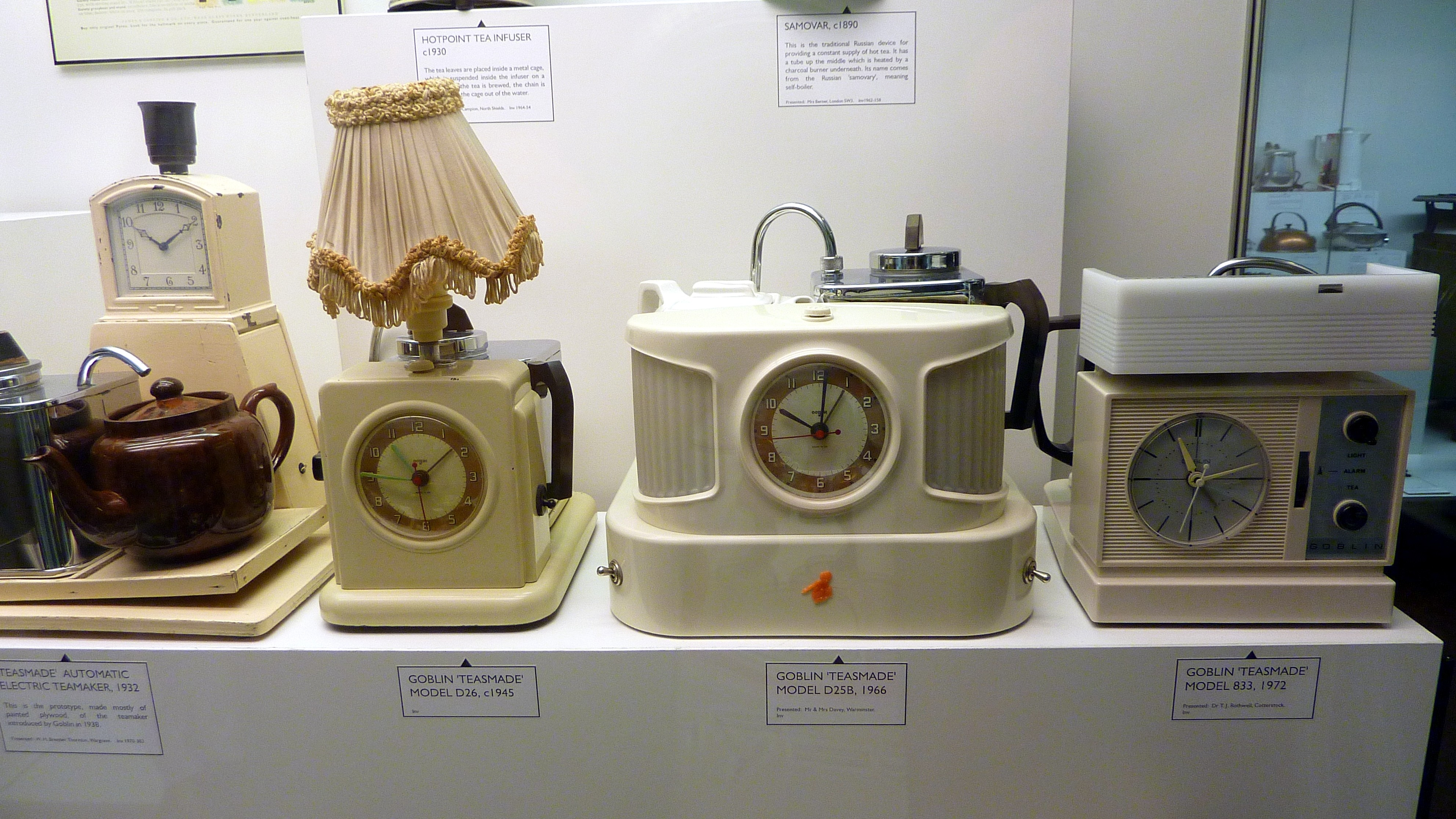
Goblin Teasmades at the Science Museum: (l-r) 1932 prototype, 1945, 1966 and 1972 production models

Goblin's next model, also invented by Thornton, was patented in 1934 and was manufactured from 1936. This was the first tea-maker sold under the name Teasmade. A patent sketch of 1934 shows the essential features. A kettle with a tube leading into a teapot was heated by an electric element switched by an alarm clock. The kettle sat upon a spring-loaded pad with a switch, so that when steam pressure pushed the boiling water into the pot, the pad was allowed to rise and cut the power to the element.

=== Ownership of the trademark ===
In the 1970s, Goblin was acquired by Birmingham Sound Reproducers (BSR), and at some point the Teasmade trademark passed from Goblin to Swan Housewares Limited, another BSR subsidiary. Archives at the Intellectual Property Office show the mark passed in 1991 from Swan to Moulinex, who had bought Swan and other brands from BSR, and then to Littlewoods Retail Limited in 2001 after the collapse of Moulinex. Littlewoods merged with Shop Direct Group in 2005 and rebranded to The Very Group in 2019. As of 2020 the trademark owner is Littlewoods Limited.

== Production ==
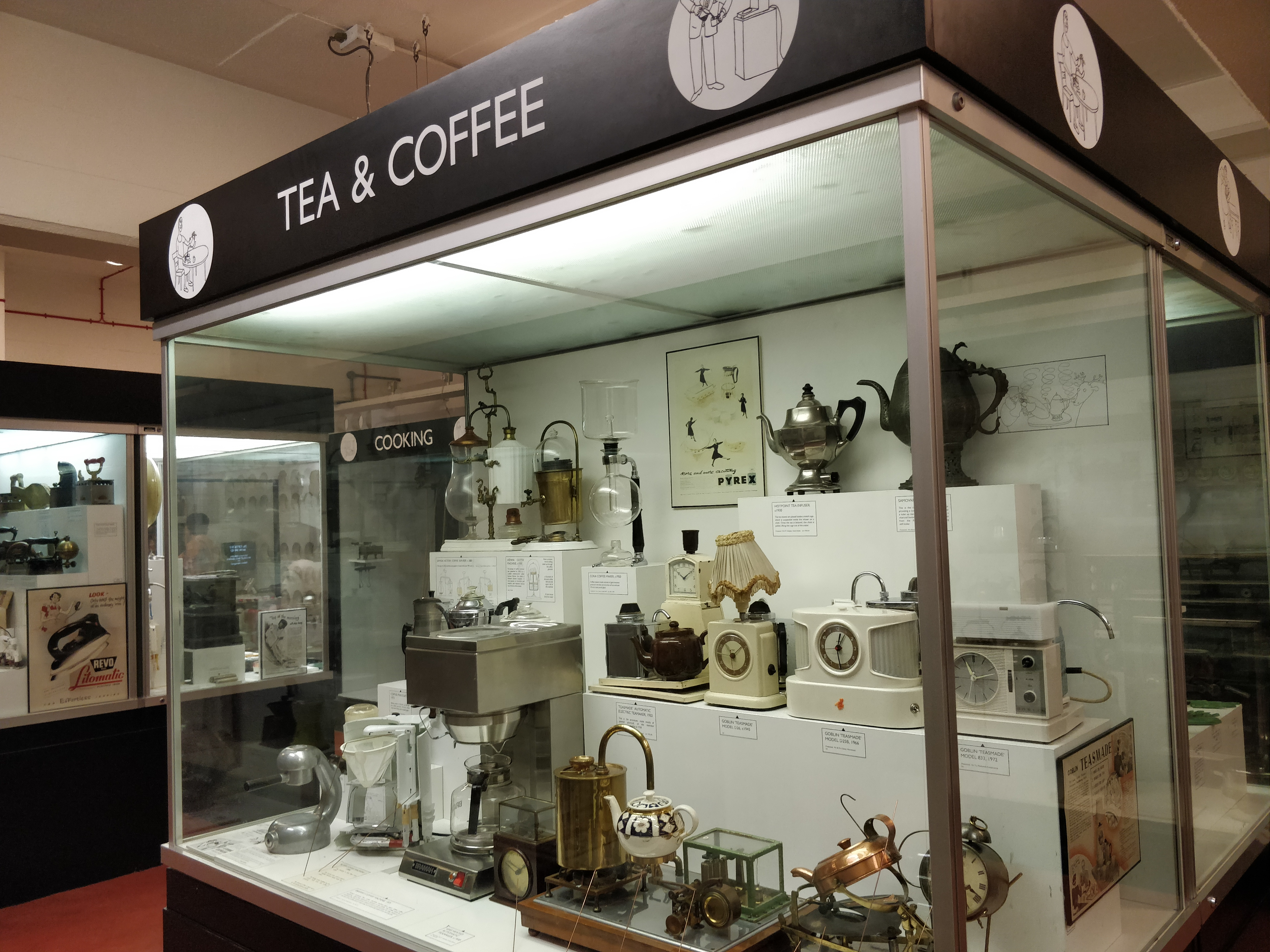
Teasmades and other tea makers at the Science Museum, London, 2019

The Swan Teasmade D01 made by RBC electronics is no longer in production.

The Swan Teasmade STM series has been manufactured in China by Swan Products since October 2009, and is being sold in many UK retailers including John Lewis and Tesco Direct. There are several versions including white, cream and retro-styled models.

The Breville Wake Cup automatic teamaker has been manufactured by Breville UK since 2012.

Sales of the Micromark Tea Express ceased in the UK when the parent company of Micromark, BDC, went into administration in November 2008.

== Collections ==
The largest known collection of teasmades was 172 examples, owned by Sheridan Parsons in Royal Wootton Bassett.

== In popular culture ==
In the music video for Queen's "I Want To Break Free", Brian May is awakened by a 1960s Goblin teasmade.

The Happy Ever After episode "Tea For Two" featured a malfunctioning gifted Teasmade.

In the 1986 Art of Noise single "Paranoimia," an insomniac Max Headroom hears an off-screen ringing sound and wonders if it's his Teasmade, but ultimately ignores it because he "can't stand tea".

In the episode of the British sitcom Mr Bean titled "The Trouble With Mr Bean", the title character, played by Rowan Atkinson, uses a 'Heath Robinson' style adapted teasmade to wake himself up out of bed by piping the boiling water onto his toes.

In episode 6, 'February', of Edwardian Farm (of the BBC historic farm series), Peter Ginn purchases a Victorian/Edwardian Era Teasmade, as one of a number of inventions of the time period.

In Season 3, Episode 2 of ITV series Endeavour (2016), a Goblin Teasmade figures prominently as the source of an explosion which kills a person.

In S1 E2 of The Kennedys (2015, BBC), instead of proposing marriage to Jenny, Tim offers to buy her a Teasmade.

Richard Osman's House of Games, a British quiz show that first aired in 2017, offered a teasmade personalised with Osman's silhouette as a prize on Thursdays in series 1 and 2.

The 1986 Robert Barnard short story Breakfast Television features a Teasmade as the murder weapon.

The 2009 BBC television series Electric Dreams featured a Teasmade in the episode about 1970s technology.

== See also ==
- Coffeemaker
- Tea in the United Kingdom
