= BBC historic farm series =

British historical documentary TV series

BBC Two's historical farm series are five documentary series first broadcast on BBC Two from 2005 to 2013. They illustrate the lives of people: farmers, labourers, fishermen, housewives, etc. in a variety of historical contexts. Historians and archaeologists play the parts of ordinary people and live and work immersed in the time specified. The team perform the everyday crafts such as hunting, gathering, sowing and reaping as well as experimenting with more specialised work like blacksmithing, woodcutting and mining under the eyes of an experienced tutor. Each series (save the first) has taken place at a public living history site that provides external in-period experts, experience, and flavour. The Wartime Farm series includes conversations with men and women who remember the time. All were produced by David Upshal for Lion Television.

	Tales from the Green Valley	Victorian Farm	Edwardian Farm	Wartime Farm	Tudor Monastery Farm
	2005	2009	2011	2012	2013
Starring	Ruth Goodman; Peter Ginn; Alex Langlands; Stuart Peachey; Chloe Spencer	Ruth Goodman; Peter Ginn; Alex Langlands	Ruth Goodman; Peter Ginn; Alex Langlands	Ruth Goodman; Peter Ginn; Alex Langlands	Ruth Goodman; Peter Ginn; Tom Pinfold
Director(s)	Peter Sommer	Stuart Elliot	Stuart Elliot	Stuart Elliot; Naomi Benson	Stuart Elliot
Era	1620	1837-1901	1901-1914	1938-1946	1457–1509
Public Locale	Gray Hill, Monmouthshire	Acton Scott Historic Working Farm	Morwellham Quay	Manor Farm Country Park	Weald and Downland Open Air Museum
Episodes	12	6	12	8	6

== Related series ==
Several other shorter series featuring the same people and production staff have been made:

- A Tudor Feast at Christmas, at Haddon Hall, 1 episode (2006)
- Victorian Farm Christmas, 3 episodes (2009)
- Victorian Pharmacy at Blists Hill Victorian Town, 4 episodes (2010) (also featuring Ruth Goodman, this time with Professor Nick Barber, who provided the necessary medical and pharmaceutical knowledge to create safer versions of many of the dangerous remedies used at the time, and Tom Quick, a PhD student.)
- A Wartime Farm Christmas Special, 1 episode (2012)
- Secrets of the Castle at Guédelon Castle, 5 episodes (2014)
- Victorian Bakers at Blists Hill Victorian Town, 4 episodes (2016) (presented by Alex Langlands with Annie Gray, featuring 4 modern bakers)
- Full Steam Ahead courtesy of British Rail, 6 episodes (2016), filmed predominantly at the Beamish Museum.
- 24 Hours in the Past, 4 episodes (2015) (presented by Ruth Goodman with Fi Glover, with six celebrities experiencing 24 hours in four working-class occupations/lives)

== Other "living history" BBC series ==
- The Victorian Kitchen Garden at Leverton, Berkshire (near Chilton Foliat, Wiltshire), 13 episodes (1987).
  - The Victorian Kitchen (with Ruth Mott), 1989.
  - The Victorian Flower Garden, 1991.
  - The Wartime Kitchen and Garden, 1993.
  - Harry's Big Adventure, 1994.
- The Sweet Makers at Blists Hill Victorian Town, Shropshire, 3 episodes and a Christmas special (2017).
- Victorian Slum House in the East End of London, 5 episodes (2016) - London slum life during Victorian era.
- Coal House, at Stack Square in the Welsh hills of Blaenavon, 2009 (12 episodes) – a 1920s Welsh mining community, including a 1944 wartime special.
- The 1900 Island, at Anglesey, 2019 (4 episodes) - a 1900 fishing village in Anglesey
- Turn Back Time – The High Street, at Shepton Mallet in Somerset, 2010 (6 episodes)
  - Turn Back Time: The Family, on Albert Road, at Morecambe in Lancashire, 2012-2012\ (5 episodes).
- Back in Time for..., 2015; each series takes one "typical" family or multiple individuals relating to the topic (e.g., factory workers in Back in Time for the Factory) and immerses them in life of past decades.
- The Victorian House of Arts and Crafts, 2019 (4 episodes)
- The Edwardian Country House – British historical reenactment reality television miniseries
- The 1900 House
- The 1940s House
- Regency House Party
