= Lion Television =

British factual production company

- Type: Subsidiary
- Founded: 1997
- Founders: Nick Catliff; Richard Bradley; Jeremy Mills
- Parent: All3Media (2019–2026); Banijay UK (2026–present)
- Divisions: Lion Television Scotland; Lion TV USA
- Website: www.liontv.com

Lion Television, also known as Lion TV, is a British factual television production company that is a subsidiary of Banijay UK headquartered in London, Glasgow and Los Angeles. Founded in 1997 by former BBC documentary producers Richard Bradley, Nick Catliff and Jeremy Mills, Lion Television produced factual, scripted & non-scripted documentary programming for networks such as BBC and Channel 4.

== History ==
In July 2001, Lion Television partnered with former head of factual at September Films, James Burstall, to launch a joint-venture production company which was called Leopard Television with the newly launched company would be based at Lion Television's headquarters and would share Lion's American offices as James Burstall became the new company's president & CEO.

On 23 June 2003, Lion Television expanded its American production services by opening a Los Angeles production office based in Los Angeles with Lion Television's former head of its New York office, Ciara Byrne, would head Lion Television's new production office based in Los Angeles via executive director. Five months later on 13 November of that year, Lion Television breached into the Asian production service with the establishment of its Beijing office via a joint venture with Chinese television network Phoenix Television as the two signed a co-production pact to produce programming from Lion's Beijing office.

In June 2004, All3Media had entered exclusive talks to acquire Lion Television alongside its Scottish division and Lion's American productions offices based in both Los Angeles & Miami and its Beijing production office (via a joint venture with Chinese television network Phoenix Television) in order for All3Media expand the group across the Atlantic and the Asian regions that would give the former turnover of at least £115m while Lion Television's co-founders Jeremy Mills and Richard Bradley would stay when All3Media's acquisition of Lion Television is completed. Two weeks later on that same month of that year, All3Media had confirmed that they acquired Lion Television and its Scottish production division, American and Chinese production offices based in Los Angeles, Miami and Beijing (the latter was a joint venture with Phoenix Television) this gained All3Media's first entry into the American & Chinese production business as Lion's American offices became All3Media's own American & Chinese production services while Lion Television's co-founders Jeremy Mills and Richard Bradley continued leading Lion Television.

In September 2019, Lion Television's parent All3Media had brought the London-based production subsidiary Lion Television with its fellow drama production outfit Lime Pictures (which All3Media had brought it in 2006) with Lion's London-based production offices being merged into the latter's production office (also based in London) while the former's managing directors & co-founders Richard Bradley and Nick Catliff joined Lime Pictures' London production office and became CCOs while retaining Lion Television continued operating as it became a label within Lime's London office.

In August 2025, Lion Television's American production arm Lion TV USA had moved to All3Media's own American production division. It had become a creative & development studio under the latter's American production division whilst it continued as a standalone label, with them working closely with its American parent All3Media American. CEO Allison Corn had departed Lion TV US while Stan Hsue continued leading Lion's American division-turned-creative & development studio as All3Media America started to produce future programming with Lion TV US.

== Filmography ==
Title	Years	Channel	Notes
Hotel	1997	BBC One	
Paddington Green	1998–2001	BBC One	
Egypt's Golden Empire	2001	PBS	First American production
Homes Under the Hammer	2003–present	BBC One	as Lion Television Scotland
History Detectives	2003–2014	PBS	co-production with Oregon Public Broadcasting
Playing it Straight	2004	Fox	
Cash Cab	2005–2006	ITV	
Tales from the Green Valley	2005	BBC Two	
Vegas Virgins	2005	Challenge	
Dealing with Dickinson	2005	BBC One	
The Queen's Cavalry	2005	BBC One	
Cash Cab USA	2005–2020	Discovery Channel/Bravo	
S.W.A.T. USA	2005	Court TV	
The Big Day	2007	BBC One	
Horrible Histories (original)	2009–2014	CBBC	co-production with Citrus Television; Owned and distributed by BBC Worldwide
Horrible Histories: Gory Games	2011–2018	CBBC	co-production with Citrus Television; Owned and distributed by BBC Worldwide
Officially Amazing	2013–2016	CBBC	
Tudor Monastery Farm	2013	BBC Two	
Sexy Beasts	2014–2021	BBC Three/Netflix	
Junk Food Flip	2014–2016	Cooking Channel	
Secrets of the Castle	2014	BBC Two	
The Secret History of the British Garden	2015	BBC Two	co-production with Alexandra Henderson Associates
Horrible Histories (revival)	2015–present	CBBC	Owned and distributed by BBC Worldwide/BBC Studios
Supertruckers	2015–2017	Quest	
Mary Beard's Ultimate Rome: Empire Without Limit	2016	BBC Two	
Driven to Love	2016–2017	We TV	Co-production with DWE Talent, Knockout Entertainment, Matar Productions and Zig Zag Productions
Mary Bread's Ultimate Rome: Empire Without Limit	2016	BBC Two	
Six Degrees of Murder	2016–2017	Investigation Discovery	
Hoarder SOS	2016	Channel 4	
Officially Amazing Goes Bonkers	2017–2018	CBBC	
Play Your Pets Right	2018–2019	Sky Kids	
Inside The Tower of London	2018–present	5	
Step Up To The Plate	2019–present	CBBC	
Mary Beard's Shock to the Beard	2020	BBC Two	
The Battle of Britain: 3 Days That Saved the Nation	2020	Channel 5	
Britain's Biggest Dig	2020	BBC Two	
22 Kids & Counting	2021–2022	Channel 5	
Tomb Hunters	2021	Smithsonian Channel	co-production with At Land Productions
Jason Biggs: Cash at Your Door	2021	E!	as Lion TV USA
Virtually Home	2021	BBC One	as Lion Television Scotland
Mary Beard's Forbidden Art	2022	BBC Two	
Stolen: Catching the Art Thieves	2022	BBC Two	as Lion Television Scotland
Arctic from Above	2023	Sky Nature	
Horrible Science	2025–present	CBBC	
Frontline: Our Soldiers Facing Putin	2026	Channel 4	
Balamory	2026-present	CBeebies	as Lion Television Scotland
