= Hotty Toddy =

Cheer for athletic teams of the University of Mississippi in Oxford, USA

Hotty Toddy is a cheer and motto associated with the Ole Miss Rebels athletic teams of the University of Mississippi in Oxford, Mississippi, United States.

== Cheer ==
The 'Hotty Toddy' cheer is recited at many Rebels athletic contests, especially at Rebel football games. Prior to kickoff, a celebrity will ask the crowd "Are you ready?", with the crowd responding:

Hell, yeah! Damn right!
Hotty Toddy, Gosh Almighty,
Who The Hell Are We? Hey!
Flim Flam, Bim Bam
Ole Miss By Damn!

In addition to the cheer, the phrase "Hotty Toddy" has become a greeting among Ole Miss fans. ESPN writer Doug Ward said that "'Hotty Toddy' has no real meaning, but it means everything in Oxford" in an October 2010 article.

== History ==
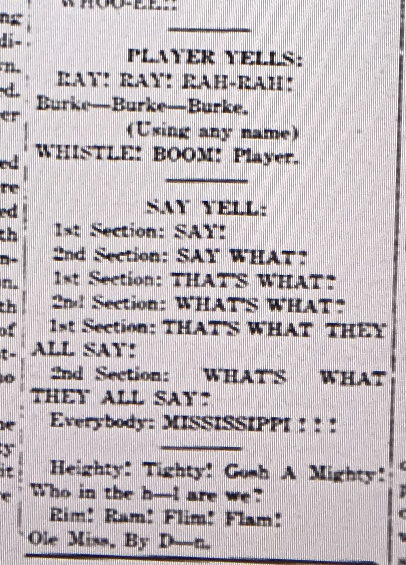
The original Hotty Toddy cheer as it appeared in the November 19, 1926, edition of The Mississippian

The origins of the cheer are unclear, with the first publication dating back to a November 19, 1926, edition of The Mississippian (now known as The Daily Mississippian), the student newspaper of the university. The original version of the cheer was "Heighty! Tighty!" It remains unclear exactly how the modern version of Hotty Toddy was formed, with explanations ranging from the "Heighty Tighties" nickname of the Virginia Tech Regimental Band, to the hot toddy alcoholic beverage, to the perception that students at the university were "hoity-toity," or pretentious.

By the late 1940s, the 'Hotty Toddy' cheer in its current form had amassed considerable popularity on the university's campus. In 1999, the university prohibited the use of the entire cheer on merchandise, as the vulgar "damn" and "hell" were thought to go against Ole Miss' brand strategy.
