= Alex Langlands =

British archaeologist and historian (born 1977)

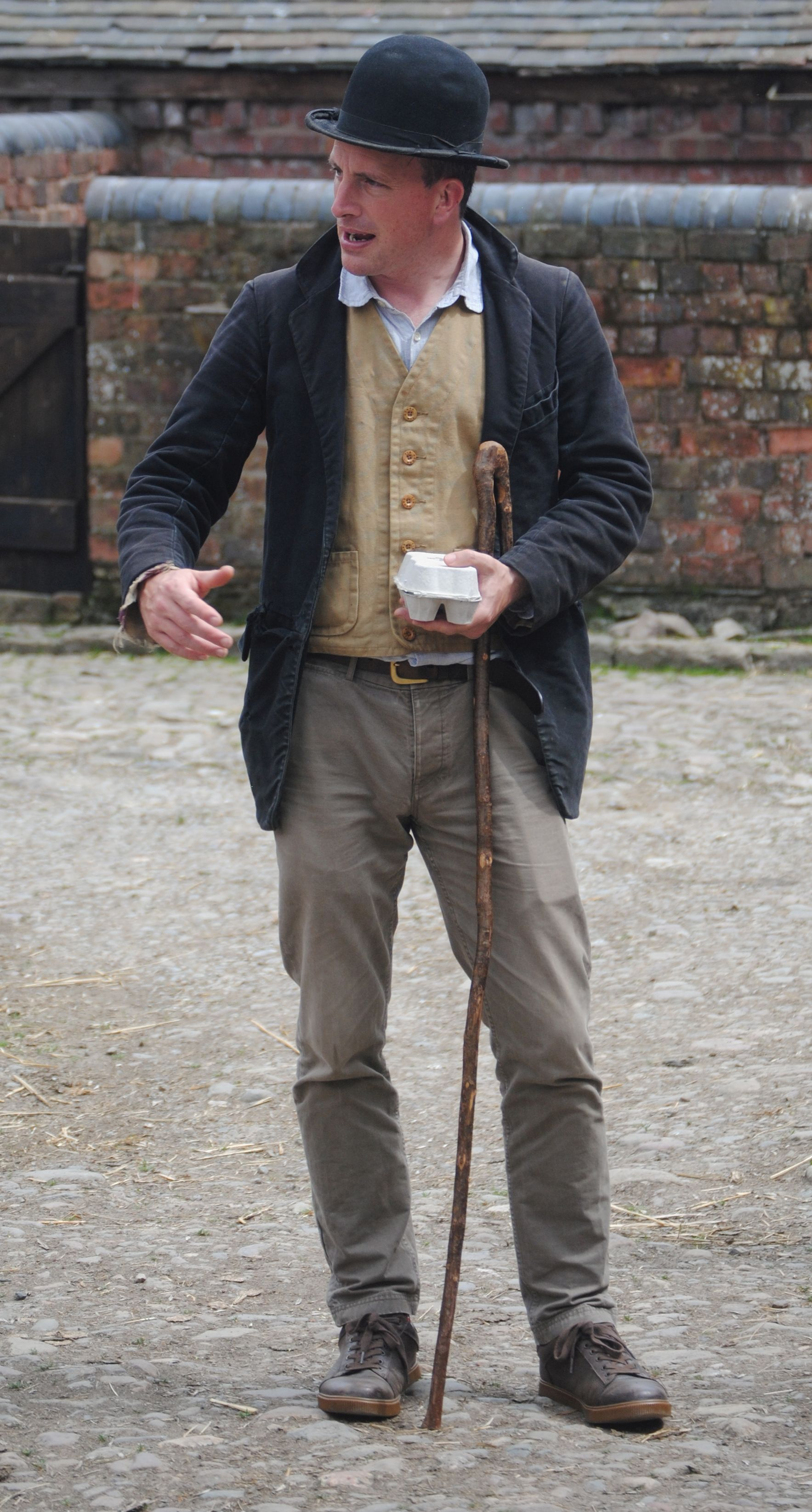
- Alex Langlands filming at Acton Scott working farm museum for the BBC's Victorian Farm (2009)
- Born: 1977 (age 48–49)
- Education: University College London; University of Winchester
- Occupations: Historian, BBC Presenter
- Notable work: BBC Farm series

Alex Langlands is a British archaeologist and historian, also known for his work as a presenter of educational documentary series on British television and a lecturer of medieval history at Swansea University.

== Education ==
Langlands has degrees in medieval archaeology and world archaeology from University College London. He has also worked in commercial archaeology before going on to complete his MPhil/PhD in early medieval history and archaeology at the University of Winchester in 2013.

== Academic posts ==
In 2011 he edited an abridged version of Henry Stephens's Book of the Farm, a work used as historical reference for the series Victorian Farm. From October 2013 to August 2015 he was lecturer at the University of Winchester. In 2015, he took up the post of lecturer in the Department of History and Classics at Swansea University. Langlands is currently a patron of the Heritage Crafts Association.

== TV work ==
Langlands began his TV career as a presenter on four of the five BBC historic farm series including Tales from the Green Valley, Victorian Farm, Edwardian Farm and Wartime Farm.

He joined Time Team on Channel 4 in 2011. In 2012, he was a competitor on BBC TV's The Great Sport Relief Bake Off. In January 2016, he co-presented the BBC Two series Victorian Bakers with Annie Gray, a historian, cook, lecturer and writer. In July 2016, he co-presented the BBC Two series Full Steam Ahead with Ruth Goodman and Peter Ginn. In November 2016, he co-presented the Channel 4 series Britain at Low Tide with paleobiologist Tori Herridge. In 2019 Langlands co-presented the BBC series Victorian Bakers and served as a judge on Penelope Keith's Village of the Year. In 2019 and 2020 he co-presented two series of the Channel 5 series Digging Up Britain's Past.
