= Overton Down =

Archaeology experiment in Wiltshire, England

Coordinates: 51.4348°N 1.8143°W

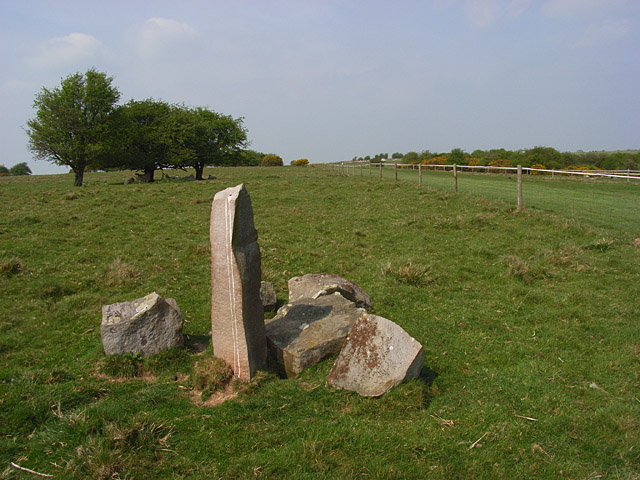
Standing stone and gallop, Overton Down. The gallop covers a mile of the down, which has a scattering of sarsen stones though not as many as areas just to the east of the gallop.

Overton Down Experimental Earthwork (often referred to simply as Overton Down) is a long-term project in experimental archaeology in Wiltshire, England. In 1960 an earthwork was built to simulate such ancient structures. Various objects were placed in it. Since then, periodic examinations of the site have been made, providing valuable insights into taphonomy. The experiment is designed to continue for 128 years.

Reports on various aspects of the site have already added significantly to the knowledge of archaeological site formation. Early in the project's history, the complexity of stratification of degraded ditch walls and their asymmetrical character was noted and examined. The excavation after thirty-two years provided information on decay rates and patterns of deposited objects, which are of use to forensic scientists. Nonintrusive examination of the ditch has indicated that in this particular environment (exposed chalky hill), after about ten years the general appearance no longer makes rapid changes in appearance and can be considered relatively stable.
