= Mahogany (drink) =

Mahogany is a dark drink whose traditional recipe is 2 parts of gin (&/or rum) to 1 part of treacle (or sugar) with lemon zest. It was drunk by active outdoorsmen such as Cornish and Devon fishermen, farmers, shepherds and Canadian lumberjacks.

== See also ==
- Hot toddy
- Absinthe
- Posset
- Edwardian Farm
