= Experimental archaeometallurgy =

Experimental archaeometallurgy is a subset of experimental archaeology that specifically involves past metallurgical processes most commonly involving the replication of copper and iron objects as well as testing the methodology behind the production of ancient metals and metal objects. Metals and elements used primarily as alloying materials, such as tin, lead, and arsenic, are also a part of experimental research.

== Experimental archaeometallurgy as a sub-discipline ==
The theory behind experimental archaeology comes from the new archaeology technique of the 1950s to use modern day examples in the form of experiments and ethnologies as analogues to past processes. Experimental archaeometallurgy is considered a part of general experimental archaeology and is rarely separated in the literature and as such, many of the principles stay the same while there is a greater focus on a single subject.

Archaeometallurgy works as a good field for experimental reproduction because of the evidence that is provided from excavation is a good starting point for reconstruction. Metallurgical remains provide a durable product that has relatively durable evidence of production methods such as slag and refractory ceramic remains. Experimentation comes in a varied amount of forms including object replication, system replication, behavioral replication, and process replication.

=== Research problems ===
Archaeometallurgical experimentation typically takes place in controlled laboratories or tries to remain as authentic as possible by being conducted using only the materials and facilities that were available to the subjects whose technology is trying to be reconstructed. Regardless of location though, the experimentation is always conducted under a different mindset outside the context of what was originally intended. A constant problem in any type of experimental archaeology is the cultural distance between the archaeologist and the individual who originally was involved with the metallurgy. This difference in mindset may lead to misunderstandings in the processes behind the metallurgy. Second to this, not all experiments are successful and it is hard to determine if this is the fault of the techniques used or the individual conducting the experiment.

=== Connection with ethnoarchaeology ===
Ethnoarchaeology has been widely used in conjunction with experimental archaeology using the techniques of modern peoples as analogues to the processes of the past. The attempted use of ethnology in archaeology tries to counteract the cultural distance of the researcher from process by changing the context of experimentation. Africa has played a large role in reconstructing copper smelting and bloomery iron furnaces as there are still several places that practice a workshop production of iron. Killick has been one such archaeologist to utilize surviving iron production in Africa to gain further insight into how other furnaces from around the world may have been constructed.

== Mining ==
Mining is among the first steps of producing metal and as such is one of the foci of experimental archaeometallurgy. However, experimental research on mining is mostly limited to firesetting and the reproduction and use of mining tools.

=== Firesetting ===
Firesetting is the process of exposing a rock face to high temperatures to induce cracking, spalling, and an overall increase to the brittleness of the rock in order to make it more susceptible to mining processes. Understanding the process of firesetting has been a crucial element to the development of an archaeological history of mining and as such has been the subject of several experiments to reproduce the technique. Typically firesetting experiments are conducted by setting a fire next to a predetermined rock face while taking measurements on the amount of and type of fuel used, temperatures of the fire and rock face, the amount of spalling before and after excavation, as well as the amount of time required for the different procedures. This examination allows for several possible inferences to be made about the mining process including the total amount of fuel a mining site may have needed to complete and its effects on the surrounding environment as well as how mining labor could have been organized. One outcome of firesetting experimentation is the realization that the quenching, or dousing the rock face with water after heating, is not necessary to making the rock face easier to excavate. The quenching process had been a standard step in most experiments with firesetting, but now more research is necessary to answer the new question of why quenching was used if it was not effective.

=== Mining tools ===
Experimental reconstruction of tools used in prehistoric mining is often written about in conjunction with the tools use after the process of firesetting. The experimental mining tool assemblage are primarily made up of hammerstones and antler picks that are reconstructed using willow and hazel sticks, rawhide, and hemp string to implement various hafting techniques and methods of utilization.

== Smelting ==
Smelting or the reduction of an ore to its metallic state is the primary source of experimentation in archaeometallurgy. In its simplest form smelting can be accomplished by placing an ore sample between two pieces of combusting charcoal in an oxygen reducing atmosphere with a compressed air source to feed the combustion and result in temperatures high enough to smelt metal. But to reach this final metallic state several things need to be done first including the processing of the ore to remove waste or gangue material, the possible roasting of the ore, the smelting of the ore, and then there is the possibility of refining the metal through a series of remelts. Then, through chemical or microscopic analysis, the products of the smelt are analyzed and compared with the findings of archaeological excavation in order to examine the likelihood of various manufacturing processes.

=== Copper and its alloys ===
The first recorded experimental work in copper was conducted by Cushing in 1894 in order to demonstrate that copper plate found in Hopewell mounds in Ohio could have been produced by the Hopewell people and not come from European trade. In his experiments, Cushing used antler and stone tools to cut out sheets of copper and puncture round holes in them through a method of pressure and grinding. In addition to the copper sheet experiments, Cushing also conducted smelting experiments reconstructed from finding at Salado Valley, Arizona pueblo excavations to reproduce copper artifacts.

=== Iron ===
The experimental archaeometallurgy of iron is more recent than that of copper in that for the most part was not widely studied until the mid-20th century. This can be attributed to the modern smelting of wrought iron still being produced as an industry up until 1900, when the last of the large-scale production shut down, along with the belief among researchers that many of the same techniques had been passed down since the inception of bloomery iron. A static technique simply was not the case as the technology used to make Roman Era iron showed the use of a technology that had long since disappeared. That being said research in iron has progressed beyond that of copper due to the greater amount of historic text and surviving remains of iron production.

Several experiments have taken place to reproduce bloomery iron. Clough presents an average example of experimental ironwork with the reproduction possible Roman bowl furnaces. Clough found the reproduction bowl furnaces to be inefficient by producing small amounts of poor quality iron, which, when compared to excavated findings of much larger better quality blooms of iron led to the conclusion that bowl furnaces were not used by the Romans.

=== Precious metals ===
Experimental work on precious metals is limited by the cost of experimentation and by the well-understood technical processes involved. Gold and silver are produced in a similar manner to copper with the additional process of cupellation. Platinum is mostly an issue in South America and is typically left out from experimental archaeometallurgy because of its traditional use as a powdered metal as an additive to produce alloys.

== Areas of research ==
Several sets of data can be collected during the experimental process of smelting including fuel consumption rates, the effects of variation in furnace airflow, temperatures, production time, and chemical composition.

=== Replication of techniques ===
The replication of technique in copper production includes a vast number of possibilities in trying to recreate what has been found through archaeological excavation. Tylecote and Boydell have experimented on possible explanations for the levels of iron found in certain copper objects and the possibility of removing excess iron through the re-melting of the copper. Crew has also done experimental work on iron to show possible loss in iron mass due to the processes involved with working the metal from bloom to billet which concluded with a loss of 75% in slag, impurities, and iron metal.

=== Alloys ===
Alloys that are not bronze and brass have had a limited representation in the literature for archaeometallurgy. This is mostly due to lack of interest or evidence in the archaeological record. Arsenical copper is one such limited research topic with some experimental work done by Pollard, Thomas, and Williams. Through several experimental smeltings of copper ores including arsenic, Pollard, Thomas, and Williams found that arsenic in copper is retained in higher levels when a lower smelting temperature is used, implying that arsenical copper may have been the result of early smelting technologies where temperatures were unable to pass a certain point.

Lead experimentation has been limited mostly because of its ease in production. Ore containing lead can be easily smelted, re-melted, and worked and as such there is not much difficulty in understanding how past societies may have produced lead. When lead experiments are conducted, they are done much in the same fashion as copper smelting experiments taking notes on quantitative elements such as completion time, airflow rates, fuel usage, and the resulting amount and composition of metal from the smelt. In addition, lead is a toxic element and special care has to take place in order to experiment with it, which makes limitations on the experiments.

=== Other aspects ===
Artifact replication plays an important role in comparing artifact use. Often objects are made not just to prove a manufacturing process or to sit in a display case, but to show that a given object will show signs of wear that are similar to those present in the archaeological record. Roberts and Ottaway conducted such experimental reconstructions by casting bronze axes using them in a preconceived manner and then comparing the results against known archaeological remains. Results gathered from such experimentation have found that objects have comparable wear patterns and there are European socketed axes that were deposited used as well as unused. Tool mark identification can also go the opposite ways using experimental reconstruction to show the difference between various material media and the wear patterns they leave. Greenfield gives one such experiment where steel, bronze, and stone tool marks on bone are all researched and examples are given for how they might be seen in the archaeological record.

Energy consumption and efficiency is another topic of interest in archaeometallurgy. Tree felling and land clearing experiments involving comparison of stone, bronze, and steel axes are popular with a number of archaeologists In these types of experiments, factors such as time spent and oxygen intake of the researchers are taken into account to try to find similarities in past life ways use of energy.

== See also ==
- Experimental archaeology
- Metals of antiquity
- Mining history
- Extractive metallurgy
- Pyrometallurgy
  - Calcining
  - Roasting
  - Smelting

== Bibliography ==
- Craddock, Paul T. (1995), Early Metal Mining and Production, Edinburgh: Edinburgh University Press.
- Forrest, Carolyn (2008), "The Nature of Scientific Experimentation in Archaeology: Experimental Archaeology from the Nineteenth to the Mid Twentieth Century", in Cunningham, Penny; Heeb, Julia; Paardekooper, Roeland (eds.), Experiencing Archaeology by Experiment, Oxford: Oxbow Books, pp. 61–68
