= Stuart Peachey =

British historian

Stuart Peachey is a British historian specialising in the English Civil War and the history of food and clothing. He has produced many works on these and other subjects. He had a leading role in the promotion of the Norfolk Trained Band, a regiment within the English Civil War Society, and is very active in the living history field.

He also runs Historical Management Associates Ltd based in Bristol, which specializes in the period 1580-1660 (Late Tudor/early Stuart).

He participated in the 2005 historical documentary TV series Tales from the Green Valley and wrote an associated book, The Building of the Green Valley: A Reconstruction of an Early 17th-century Rural Landscape, published in 2006.
