= Victorian Farm =

British historical documentary TV series

- Ruth, Peter and Alex on the DVD cover
- Directed by: Stuart Elliott
- Starring: Peter Ginn; Ruth Goodman; Alex Langlands
- Country of origin: United Kingdom
- Original language: English
- No. of series: 1
- No. of episodes: 6

Production
- Producer: David Upshal
- Running time: 1 hour per episode
- Production company: Lion Television

Original release
- Network: BBC Two
- Release: 8 January – 24 December 2009

Victorian Farm is a British historical documentary TV series in six parts, first shown on BBC Two in January 2009, and followed by three Christmas-themed parts in December of the same year. The series, the second in the BBC historic farm series, recreates everyday life on a farm in Shropshire in the 1880s, using authentic replica equipment and clothing, original recipes and reconstructed building techniques. It was made for the BBC by independent production company Lion Television and filmed at a preserved Victorian era living museum farm, Acton Scott Historic Working Farm, Shropshire. The farming team was historian Ruth Goodman, and archaeologists Alex Langlands and Peter Ginn.

Much use was made of period sources such as The Book of the Farm: Detailing the Labours of the Farmer, Farm-steward, Ploughman, Shepherd, Hedger, Cattle-man, Field-worker, and Dairy-maid by Dr Henry Stephens, first published in London in 1844.

The series was one of BBC Two's biggest hits of 2009, with audiences of up to 3.8 million per episode. It was highly praised by reviewers.

A corollary miniseries, Victorian Farm Christmas, comprised three episodes aired at Christmastime in 2009.

An associated book by Langlands, Ginn and Goodman, also titled Victorian Farm, was published in 2009. The book reached number one on the Sunday Times best seller list in February 2009.

The series is a sequel to Tales from the Green Valley, shown on BBC Two in 2005. The BBC commissioned two follow-ups with the same production team and cast: Victorian Farm Christmas, which aired in December 2009, and Edwardian Farm, aired from November 2010. In September 2012 the same cast returned with the third instalment of the BBC Farm series: Wartime Farm. The fourth installment came in 2013, Tudor Monastery Farm. Various Christmas specials were also broadcast.

== Episodes ==
=== Episode 1 ===
This was first broadcast on Thursday 8 January 2009 at 9 pm. The would-be farmers move into a disused cottage. This requires much renovation: replacing the coal-burning range, cleaning the chimney and refuelling from a narrowboat on a nearby canal; cleaning the bedroom by removing dead birds, disinfecting against bedbugs with turpentine and salt, restoring the lime plaster and redecorating.

In accordance with custom, they assist in the threshing of the previous year's crop of wheat, using a steam-powered thresher. A field is ploughed, harrowed and sown with the next year's crop using horse-drawn implements of the era. Apples are picked, milled and pressed to make cider while other fruits and berries are preserved as a spicy chutney.

A flock of Shropshire ewes is acquired and the first meal is cooked and eaten: a leg of boiled mutton.

=== Episode 2 ===
As winter draws on, animal fodder and shelter is provided. Mangelwurzels are stored in a clamp and then chipped with period machinery to feed the cows. A pigsty is built upon a foundation of bottles to provide insulation and three young Tamworth pigs and a pregnant Gloucestershire Old Spot sow are housed there upon completion. A ram is added to the sheep flock and marked with a raddle to ensure that he impregnates all the ewes, so that they will lamb in the spring. A shire horse, named Clumper, is also added to the livestock and training in his use as a draught animal is performed.

Domestically, the weekly laundry is done in a Victorian style. Stain removal is first performed, for example, using milk to remove an ink stain. Then the clothes are hand-paddled, mangled and ironed over a period of several days.

Christmas is celebrated with a church service; the Victorian novelty of a Christmas tree; a plum pudding and a roast turkey; and presents are exchanged such as some hand-made braces.

=== Episode 3 ===
New Year arrives and the farm needs emergency repairs, with the help of the woodsman, the blacksmith and the basket maker. Ruth has a go at some traditional potions and remedies. When the wheat crop comes under attack, it is time for some pest control, Victorian style, as Alex and Peter join a pheasant hunt. Alex goes out catching rabbits with a team of Victorian poachers. And with spring around the corner, the first baby animals are ready to be born.

=== Episode 4 ===
It is spring and there are lambs and pigs to be delivered, which means Alex and Peter need to master animal midwifery. A prized ewe is in danger and a lame horse may jeopardise vital work on the farm. The team witness the birth of many chicks and ducklings, along with 8 (originally 9) piglets from the pig Princess.

The team turns to Victorian science in a bid to save their struggling crops. If they succeed, they will have something to celebrate at the May Day fair. If they fail, all their hard work will have been in vain.

=== Episode 5 ===
In this episode, the team embarks on a trip by steam train, Ruth begins a tough task in the dairy, Alex tries his hand at beekeeping, the sheep get sheared using the latest time-saving technology, and the lengthening summer days allow Alex and Peter to try out the new Victorian sport of cricket. It is also time for the hay harvest, weather permitting.

Ruth makes cheddar cheese in the dairy with her daughter, Catherine Goodman, using milk from the cow Forget Me Not and rennet from a neighbour's male calf. The sheep shearing is a life saver because it turns out that the sheep have severe fly strike. It is Alex's birthday and Ruth makes him a cake and a picnic, while Peter buys him a book about setting up an apiary. The boys make a predator-proof cover for the landlord's raspberry patch.

=== Episode 6 ===
It is the end of their year on the farm. They sell off the pigs and sheep they successfully bred and raised. Ruth learns straw plaiting and makes a hat and cooks a Victorian style curry. Everything is now focused on the wheat harvest. Peter and Alex get the dray and a reaping and binding machine repaired and brew beer for the harvest. The harvest is completed just before the rain comes, with Ruth harvesting the last of the corn. Once the wheat is dried and stored they ring the church bells, enjoy a harvest festival and reflect upon their time on the farm. They hand over the key to their landlord and depart the farm.

== Related programmes ==
A three-part follow-up series, Victorian Farm Christmas, was produced in 2009, in which Goodman, Langlands and Ginn return to the Acton Scott Estate after a year away to recreate preparations for a Victorian Christmas. The series was filmed in August and September 2009 and was broadcast on BBC Two beginning on 11 December 2009. Other historians feature, such as Ivan Day and Professor Ronald Hutton. The windmill featured in the first programme was Wilton Windmill, Great Bedwyn, Wiltshire.

Because of the popularity of Victorian Farm, Lion Television went on to produce a daytime series, Ben Fogle's Escape in Time (a format devised by Victorian Farm producer David Upshal) in which families were given the opportunity to live at Acton Scott for a week, learning and competing in historical skills. The series was filmed back-to-back with Victorian Farm Christmas in September 2009 and shown in July 2010. Langlands, Ginn and Goodman did not appear, though the latter's daughter, Eve Goodman, did feature.

Victorian Pharmacy was a four-part series in a similar style to Victorian Farm, also made by Lion and shown on BBC Two in 2010. Filmed almost exclusively at Blists Hill Victorian Town, it revolved around a recreation of a Victorian chemist's shop and included Ruth Goodman among its presenters, with Victorian Farm narrator Stephen Noonan providing the voiceover.

== DVD ==
The DVD of Victorian Farm is distributed by Acorn Media UK.
