= War agricultural executive committee =

War agricultural executive committees were government-backed organisations tasked with increasing agricultural production in each county of the United Kingdom, during both the First and Second World Wars. They were established in Autumn 1915 by the 2nd Earl of Selborne in a collaboration between the Board of Agriculture and county councils, with the aim of better managing the country's limited wartime agricultural resources.

They were later re-formed in Autumn 1939 with the outbreak of the Second World War, and given more expansive powers over farmers and landowners in the United Kingdom. After performing surveys of rural land in their county, each committee was given the power to serve orders to farmers "requiring work to be done, or, in cases of default, to take possession of the land". Committees could decide, on a farmer's behalf, which crops should be planted in which fields, so as to best increase the production of foodstuffs in their areas.

With the help of the war agricultural executive committees, or "war ags", British farmers increased the total productive land in the UK by 1.7 million acres between 1939 and the Spring of 1940.

== See also ==
- Women's Land Army
