= Gray Hill, Monmouthshire =

Coordinates: 51.63743°N 2.82070°W

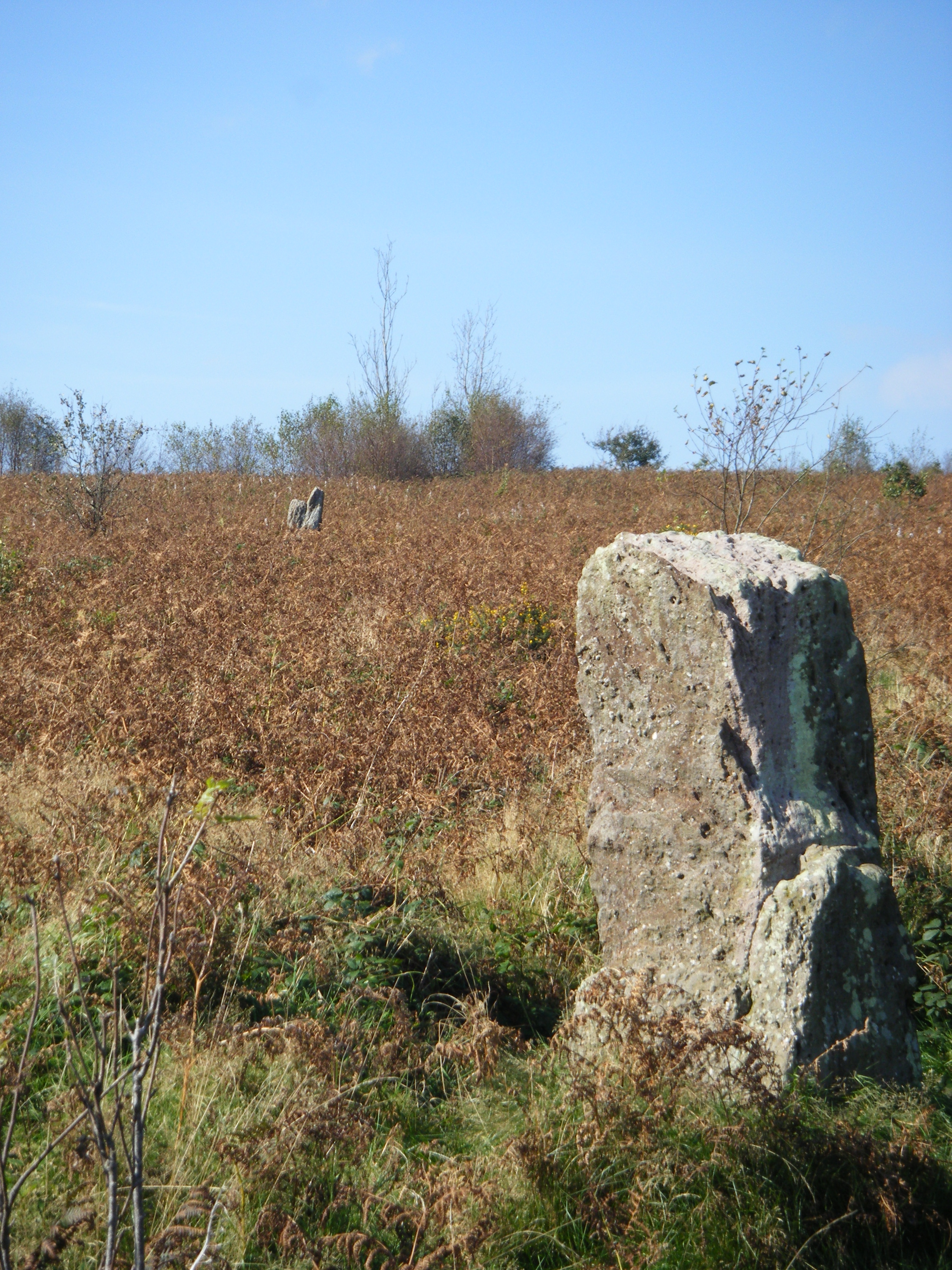
Two of the standing stones on Gray Hill

Gray Hill (Welsh: Mynydd Llwyd) is a hill approximately 2 miles north of the village of Llanvair Discoed, Monmouthshire, South Wales, rising to 896 feet (273 m) above sea level.

== Location ==
Gray Hill is on the eastern side of Wentwood Reservoir opposite Mynydd Alltir Fach which sits on the western side of the reservoir. Wentwood rises behind these two hills. The nearest large village or town is Caerwent. The summit of the hill has views over the Caldicot Levels and Severn estuary, as well as inland.

== Geology ==
Geologically the hill forms a detached part of a longer north and west-facing sandstone scarp which runs roughly northeast through Monmouthshire from Llandevaud to the Wye valley south of Monmouth. Gray Hill is formed from various sandstones of the Old Red Sandstone (or 'ORS') which were laid down during the Devonian period. The northern and western slopes and the lower southern slopes are formed by the lower ORS Brownstones Formation. Unconformably overlying these rocks are the upper ORS Quartz Conglomerates which are pebbly in nature, themselves overlain by the sandstones of the Tintern Sandstone Group. Each of these layers is tilted to the south.

== Remains ==
Gray Hill is known locally for its prehistoric remains which include standing stones, a stone circle at a height of about 900 feet above sea level and overlooking the Severn Estuary, as well as cairns, Bronze Age tumuli (funerary barrows)field boundaries and enclosures including a D-shaped Neolithic or Bronze Age enclosure. The stone circle is approximately 32 feet in diameter and has been dated to the Bronze Age, circa 4000 years ago.

== See also ==
- Castell Henllys
- Tales from the Green Valley -- a BBC BBC historic farm series using a repaired site in Gray Hill
