= 24 Hours in the Past =

2015 British television series

- Genre: Living history
- Directed by: Chris Parkin
- Presented by: Fi Glover; Ruth Goodman
- Starring: Alistair McGowan; Ann Widdecombe; Colin Jackson; Miquita Oliver; Tyger Drew-Honey; Zöe Lucker
- No. of series: 1
- No. of episodes: 4

Production
- Executive producer: Rachel Morgan
- Producer: James Peters
- Production company: Darlow Smithson Productions

Original release
- Network: BBC One
- Release: 28 April – 19 May 2015

24 Hours in the Past is a BBC One living history TV series first broadcast in 2015. Six celebrities were immersed in a recreation of impoverished life in Victorian Britain. Each of the four episodes represented 24 hours living and working in four different occupations.

A key part of the series was its immersive nature. The four episodes were ostensibly filmed in direct sequence, and the participants lived, ate and slept in the often filthy conditions portrayed.

Living history had become a popular theme in UK TV series at the time, usually involving Ruth Goodman and regular collaborators in a long-term series, filmed in intermittent episodes with a cast of historians. This series took a different pitch, using a continuous filming technique without the respite of hotels between episodes and cast with "the randomest collection of participants" to create an air of surprise at their conditions.

== Cast ==
=== Presenters ===
- Fi Glover
- Ruth Goodman, well-known consultant historian and TV presenter for many living history series.

=== Participants ===
- Alistair McGowan, impressionist
- Ann Widdecombe, former Conservative MP and cabinet minister
- Colin Jackson, world champion hurdler
- Miquita Oliver, TV presenter
- Tyger Drew-Honey, actor in Outnumbered
- Zöe Lucker, actress

== Episodes ==
No.	Title	Location	Original release date
1	"Dustyard"	Black Country Living Museum	28 April 2015
A Victorian dustyard, where domestic rubbish was sorted. Some was then re-sold and recycled, such as rags, bones, sieved ash for building materials and "puer". (Note: Dog faeces, used in the tanning of glove leather. Pronounced, and often spelled, 'pure'.)
2	"Coaching inn"	The New Inn at Stowe	5 May 2015
The cast work at a busy coaching inn, the New Inn, built by Lord Cobham in 1717 as part of his estate at Stowe. Diverse visitors to the inn are served meals, stay overnight, and have their horses groomed. Ann Widdecombe begins a theme of the series, by protesting vociferously against working conditions.
3	"Potteries"	Gladstone Pottery Museum, Stoke-on-Trent	12 May 2015
The cast move into the expanding factories of the Victorian era and begin work in a pottery. Things progress badly, with further agitation by Ann Widdecombe inspiring a strike and lockout of the workers.
4	"Workhouse"	The Workhouse, Southwell	19 May 2015
The cast, now presumed to be destitute, were consigned to the workhouse. After leading a refusal to wash, Ann was subjected to solitary confinement.

== Reception ==
Critical reception was muted. The most scathing description as "frustrating and pointless watching" came from The Guardian.

The most best-known cast member was Ann Widdecombe, a cabinet minister in the Back to Basics government of John Major. Some reviewers saw it as ironic that she took the role of a labour organiser protesting against oppressive employers. Widdecombe denied that any part was scripted and confirmed that all of the grim accommodation was genuine.

Viewing figures were unimpressive. Although it did well against other programming in that slot, its series average of 3.3m (16%) was below the BBC1's slot average of 4.9m for the previous year. Viewing figures for the series dropped from 3.8m for the first episode to 3.2m.
