= Edwardian Farm =

British historical documentary TV series

- Starring: Peter Ginn; Ruth Goodman; Alex Langlands
- Country of origin: United Kingdom
- No. of episodes: 12

Production
- Running time: 60 minutes
- Production company: Lion Television

Original release
- Network: BBC Two
- Release: 10 November 2010 – 19 January 2011

Edwardian Farm is a British historical documentary TV series in twelve parts, first shown on BBC Two from November 2010 to January 2011. As the third series on the BBC historic farm series, following the original, Tales from the Green Valley, it shows a group of historians recreating the running of a farm during the Edwardian era. It was made for the BBC by independent production company Lion Television and filmed at Morwellham Quay, an historic port in Devon. The farming team was historian Ruth Goodman and archaeologists Alex Langlands and Peter Ginn. The series was devised and produced by David Upshal and directed by Stuart Elliott, Chris Michell and Naomi Benson.

The series is a development from two previous series, Victorian Farm and Victorian Pharmacy, which were among BBC Two's biggest hits of 2009 and 2010, receiving audiences of up to 3.8 million per episode. It was followed by Wartime Farm in September 2012, featuring the same team but this time in Hampshire on Manor Farm, living a full calendar year as World War II-era farmers.

An associated book by Goodman, Langlands, and Ginn, also titled Edwardian Farm, was published in 2010 by BBC Books. The series was also released on DVD.

Ceri Radford wrote in The Daily Telegraph that 'Beyond farming, the presenters do not live in an Edwardian bubble: during filming, they can go home to their families and even embrace modern dental hygiene. Even the traditional methods they use to rear chickens, turkeys, goats, pigs and cattle, have their limitations; modern bureaucracy intrudes. "Every time a calf is born, you have to tag it and register it. After six weeks it nearly gave us a nervous breakdown," Langlands says'.

== Episodes ==
No.	Title	Directed by	Original release date
1	"September"	Stuart Elliott	10 November 2010
The trio establish their domicile, scrubbing a flagstone floor and cleaning out a clogged chimney. They build a hayrick to put up hay, hire a stonemason to make a trough, learn to thatch, make a rag rug and begin keeping chickens and sheep. Ruth cooks a sheep's head stew.
2	"October"	Stuart Elliott	17 November 2010
Alex and Peter milk goats and train the ploughhorses. They begin a market garden of strawberries. Ruth pickles apples, salts a ham, and smokes bacon. Alex and Peter press apples to cider (scrumpy), freighting first the apples, then the barrel on the river. They visit a cooper and make lime putty. They read government agricultural leaflets, collect eggs, make chicken stew, and celebrate Halloween in Edwardian style.
3	"November"	Chris Marshall	24 November 2010
Ruth prepares for the arrival of the farm's pigs and works on the privy, while Alex and Peter compare ploughing with horses to ploughing with the world's oldest working tractor. Peter begins a trout hatchery. In order to repair the hedgerows, Alex takes a trip to a water-powered smithy for a billhook. Ruth makes sloe gin for Christmas and entertains with a gramophone.
4	"December"	Chris Marshall	1 December 2010
As winter sets in, the three farm dwellers must look further afield to earn money. Peter and Alex fish for crabs while Ruth hires herself out for domestic work. Ruth rides a bicycle and tries period cleaning techniques, including early vacuum cleaners. They separate growing calves from their mothers. Peter finds out how leather is made. They celebrate Christmas modestly, as poor farmers might have, and listen to a Methodist Christmas message.
5	"January"	Stuart Elliott	8 December 2010
The continuing winter forces Alex and Peter down a copper mine, while Ruth makes lace. The copper mine is the King Edward Mine, Camborne, Cornwall, and the lace-making is at Honiton.
6	"A day in the life (February)"	Stuart Elliott	15 December 2010
Six months into their year, Ruth, Alex and Peter explore the daily lives of Edwardian farmers. This episode has a slightly different format to the rest of the series; instead of covering a whole month's changes it uses a framing device of Ruth writing a letter describing the events of a single day on the farm. Peter buys a Victorian/Edwardian Era Teasmade.
7	"March"	Chris Mitchell	19 December 2010
Spring arrives with the lambs and the potato crop planted with manure. Daffodils are harvested and sent by train across the country. A Dartmoor pony is broken in and Easter eggs are decorated using natural dyes, while chicks are successfully hatched.
8	"April"	Stuart Elliott	24 December 2010
Time is divided between the land and the sea. Ruth learns how to make Devon lace and researches how to scavenge the coast in order to make food or sell items for extra money. The boys attempt to make money from the sea by catching crabs.
9	"May"	Naomi Benson	31 December 2010
Summer brings the tourists, so the farm provides strawberries and clotted cream. Peter and Alex address keeping the sheep free from pests until they can be sheared.
10	"June"	Chris Mitchell	6 January 2011
June arrives so the sheep go up onto the moors of Dartmoor with Alex and Peter guiding (fortified with biscuits and Mahogany wine, courtesy of Ruth), leaving Ruth to run the farm, including spraying Bordeaux mixture on the potato crop. Alex and Peter try their hands at sheep-shearing and dry stone walling, and observe sheepdogs at work. Ruth makes her own cheese and visits an early wool mill. Finally, they have an Edwardian picnic with a vintage car and then go rambling and letterboxing on the moor.
11	"July"	Stuart Elliott	12 January 2011
July brings the harvest, cherries and potatoes. Ruth goes salmon fishing on the River Tamar with a seine net. Peter and Alex pick cherries from tall ladders and Ruth prepares cherry preserves. They try out Edwardian potato digging devices and employ child labour. The annual day holiday at Lynton and Lynmouth is a welcome distraction.
12	"August"	Stuart Elliott	19 January 2011
August brings to an end the year on the farm; weather dictates the harvest and the seaside brings much needed fertilizer.
