= Hot toddy =

Hot alcoholic drink with whiskey

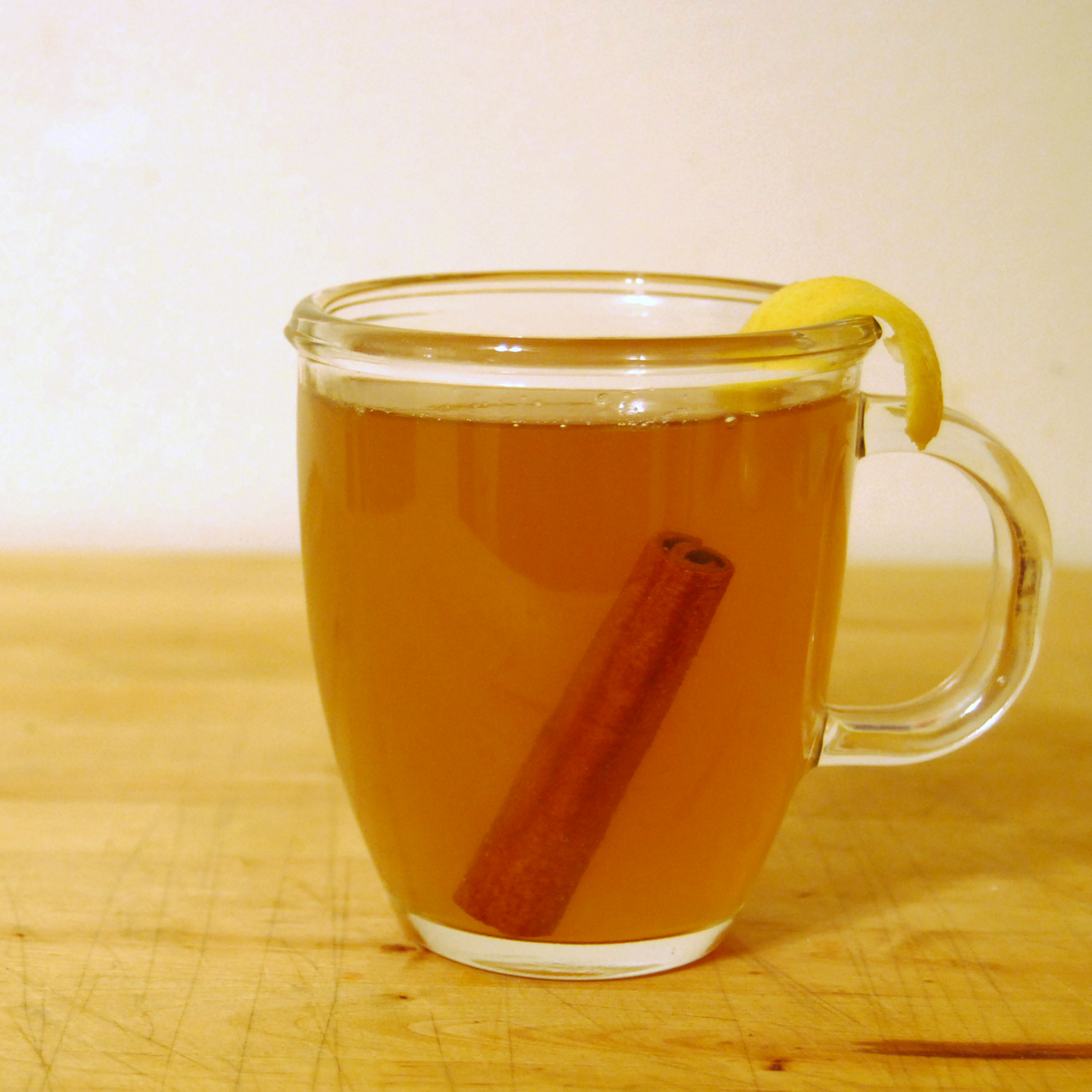
A hot toddy

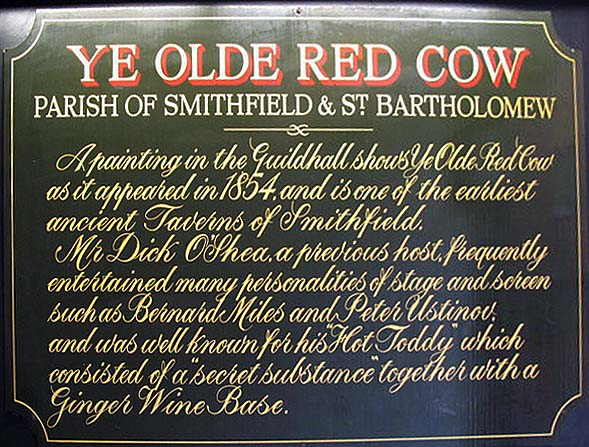
Information board highlighting the hot toddy at Ye Olde Red Cow pub in London

A hot toddy, also known as hot whiskey in Ireland, and occasionally called southern cough syrup within the Southern United States, is typically a mixed drink made of liquor and water with honey (or in some recipes, sugar), lemon, and spices, and served hot. Recipes vary, and hot toddy is traditionally drunk as a nightcap before retiring for the night, in wet or cold weather, or to relieve the symptoms of the cold and flu. In How to Drink, Victoria Moore describes the drink as "the vitamin C for health, the honey to soothe, the alcohol to numb."

== Preparation ==
A hot toddy is a mixture of a spirit (usually whisky), hot water, and honey (or, in some recipes, sugar). In Canada, maple syrup may be used. Additional ingredients such as cloves, a lemon slice or cinnamon (in stick or ground form) are often also added.

== Etymology ==
The word toddy comes from the toddy drink in India, produced by fermenting the sap of palm trees. Its earliest known use to mean "a beverage made of alcoholic liquor with hot water, sugar, and spices" is from 1786. It is often referred to as a 'Hot Toddy'. A later version came from Robert Bentley Todd who prescribe a hot drink of brandy, canella (white cinnamon), sugar syrup, and water.

== Variations ==
A cold toddy is made with rye whiskey, oranges, lemons, cinnamon sticks, ginger, Earl Grey tea, cloves, honey, and orange or regular bitters. It is served with ice and stirred until it is very cold.

== See also ==
- Elixir
- Mahogany (drink)
- Grog is the name of a similar drink based on rum in several cultures.
- Posset
  - Atholl brose
- Absinthe
- List of hot drinks
- Tamagozake, the traditional Japanese cold cure, uses heated sake mixed with raw egg.
