= Treigny =

Commune in Yonne, France

- Part of Treigny-Perreuse-Sainte-Colombe
- Location of Treigny
- Location within France Location within Bourgogne-Franche-Comté
- Coordinates: 47°33′05″N 3°11′05″E
- Country: France
- Region: Bourgogne-Franche-Comté
- Department: Yonne
- Arrondissement: Auxerre
- Canton: Vincelles
- Commune: Treigny-Perreuse-Sainte-Colombe
- Area^{1}: 52.70 km^{2} (20.35 sq mi)
- Highest elevation: 367 m (1,204 ft)
- Lowest elevation: 187 m (614 ft)
- Population (2022): 844
  - Density: 16.0/km^{2} (41.5/sq mi)
- Time zone: UTC+01:00 (CET)
  - Summer (DST): UTC+02:00 (CEST)
- Postal code: 89520
- ^{1} French Land Register data, which excludes lakes, ponds, glaciers > 1 km^{2} (0.386 sq mi or 247 acres) and river estuaries.

Treigny (French pronunciation: [tʁɛɲi]) is a former commune in the Yonne department in Bourgogne-Franche-Comté in north-central France. On 1 January 2019, it was merged into the new commune Treigny-Perreuse-Sainte-Colombe.

== See also ==
- Communes of the Yonne department
- Guédelon Castle
