= Ruth Goodman =

British freelance historian (born 1963)

Ruth Ellen Goodman
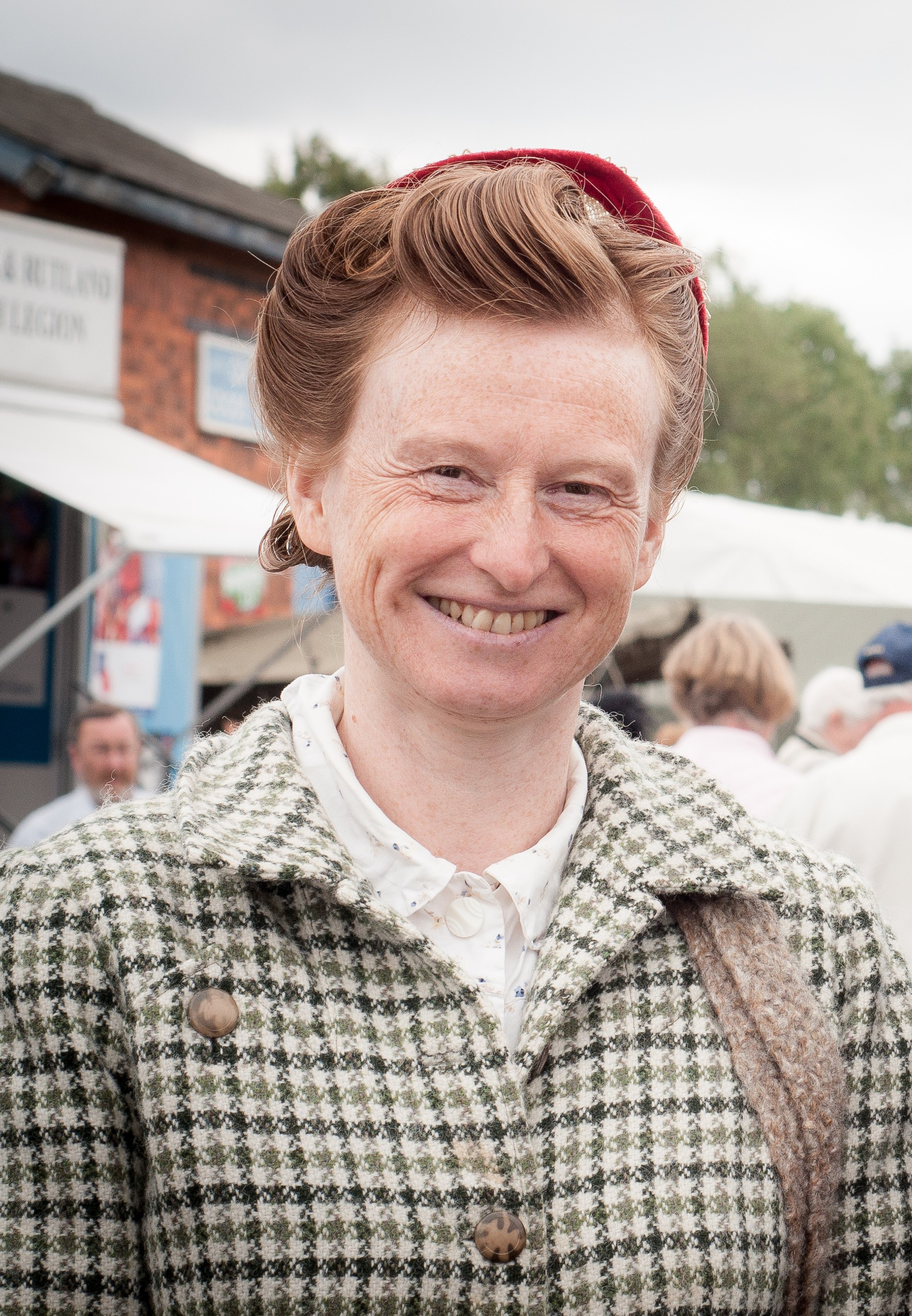
- Goodman in 2013
- Born: 1963 (age 62–63); Cardiff, Wales
- Education: University of Exeter
- Occupations: BBC presenter, historian
- Notable work: BBC documentaries, advisor to the Victoria & Albert Museum
- Website: www.ruthgoodman.me.uk

Ruth Ellen Goodman (born 1963) is a British freelance historian of the early modern period, specialising in offering advice to museums and heritage attractions.

She is a specialist in British social history and after presenting the 2005 television series Tales from the Green Valley, went on to participate in several BBC historic farm series. She occasionally presents features for The One Show, and she co-presented Secrets of the Castle in 2014, and 24 Hours in the Past (2015). Since 2015 she has appeared on Inside the Factory, presenting usually two short features or ‘historic insets’ related to the main subject of the episode.

== Early life and education ==
She was born in Cardiff, Wales, later moving to Hertfordshire, England and went to Westbury primary school and Fearnhill School in Letchworth, North Hertfordshire district of Hertfordshire, England. "School...was rather pedestrian...I became a very poor student, simply going through the motions, and my academic record at both school and university indeed lacks lustre." Goodman studied at the University of Exeter.

== Career ==
Goodman is a self-taught social and domestic historian. She has been a consultant to the Victoria & Albert Museum and to the film Shakespeare in Love. She is a member of the Tudor Group, a re-enactment organisation for the Tudor period. Since participating in Tales from the Green Valley in 2005, she has been a presenter on the BBC television educational documentary series Victorian Farm, Victorian Pharmacy, Edwardian Farm, Tudor Monastery Farm, Wartime Farm, Wartime Farm Christmas, Secrets of the Castle, and Full Steam Ahead. She participated in the 2011 series of Celebrity Masterchef. Since 2015, she has presented segments within the BBC television series Inside the Factory.

Goodman "couldn't get a job after university", so she trained for a job as railway ticket clerk for British Rail, working at Chester station for a short time.

In 2022, Goodman was featured in A Farm Through Time with brothers Rob and Dave Nicholson, a three-part series shown on Channel 5 that explores how farming practices have changed over the years. Prior to A Farm Through Time she had appeared with the brothers on one of their nightly ...on the Farm programmes at Cannon Hall Farm, discussing alcoholic brews from the past.

Goodman said of Tudor Monastery Farm that '"Of course, there’s a slight fantasy element to the series ... but it’s not pure indulgence ... If you look at history, you realise that everything in the past has been different ... And that means that everything in the future can be different. You can be powerful. You can change the world"'.

== Television ==
Year	Title	Notes
2005	Tales from the Green Valley	
2006	A Tudor Feast at Christmas	
2009	Victorian Farm	
2010	Edwardian Farm	
2010	Victorian Pharmacy	
2012	Wartime Farm	
2013	Tudor Monastery Farm	
2014	Secrets of the Castle	
2015	24 Hours in the Past	
2015–2025	Inside the Factory	
2016	Full Steam Ahead	
2022	A Farm Through Time	
2023	Women in Industry with Ruth Goodman	
2025	Rich Times, Poor Times	3 episodes

== Audio ==
Year	Title	Type	Role	Notes
2024	The Curious History of Your Home	Podcast	Narrator	31-episode series exploring the history of everyday objects including toothpaste, toilets and the fridge.

== Personal life ==
She lives in Buckinghamshire and is married to Tudor re-enactor and musician Mark Goodman, who participated in one episode of Tudor Monastery Farm. Goodman has two daughters.

Goodman was awarded an honorary degree in 2012 by Bishop Grosseteste University, Lincoln, for her contribution to history education.

As a result of her social history research, she has stopped using detergents in her washing machine, never eats factory farmed food and sometimes cooks on an open wood fire. For a period of three months she followed a Tudor body cleansing regime and no one complained or noticed a smell.

== Books by Ruth Goodman ==
- Victorian Farm Kitchen: Recipes, Hints and Tips Rediscovered. Pavilion Books. August 2010. ISBN 978-1-86205-887-3.
- How to be a Tudor: A Dawn-to-Dusk Guide to Everyday Life (2016). ISBN 9780241973714
- How to be a Victorian (2014). ISBN 9780670921362
- How to Behave Badly in Renaissance Britain (2018). ISBN 9781782438526

- How to Behave Badly in Elizabethan England: A Guide for Knaves, Fools, Harlots, Cuckolds, Drunkards, Liars, Thieves, and Braggarts (2018). ISBN 9781782438496 (American edition of How to Behave Badly in Renaissance Britain)

- The Domestic Revolution: How the Introduction of Coal into Victorian Homes Changed Everything (2020). ISBN 9781631497636

== See also ==
- BBC historic farm series
