= Tales from the Green Valley =

- Genre: Documentary series
- Directed by: Peter Sommer
- Starring: Stuart Peachey; Ruth Goodman; Alex Langlands; Peter Ginn; Chloe Spencer
- Narrated by: Owen Teale
- Composer: David Poore
- Country of origin: United Kingdom
- Original language: English
- No. of seasons: 1
- No. of episodes: 12

Production
- Executive producer: Richard Bradley
- Producers: Peter Sommer; David Upshal (series producer)
- Cinematography: Peter Harvey; Pete Hayns
- Running time: 30 minutes
- Production company: Lion Television

Original release
- Network: BBC Two
- Release: 19 August – 4 November 2005

Tales from the Green Valley is a British historical documentary TV series in 12 parts, first shown on BBC Two from 19 August to 4 November 2005. The series, the first in the historic farm series, made for the BBC by independent production company Lion TV, follows historians and archaeologists as they recreate farm life from the age of the Stuarts; they wear the clothes, eat the food and use the tools, skills and technology of the 1620s.

The series recreates everyday life on a small farm in Gray Hill, Monmouthshire, Wales, in the period, using authentic replica equipment and clothing, original recipes and reconstructed building techniques. Much use is made of period sources such as agricultural writers Gervase Markham and Thomas Tusser.

The series was written, directed and produced by British archaeologist and documentary maker, Peter Sommer, who was awarded the Learning on Screen Award in 2006 by the British Universities Film & Video Council, for Tales from the Green Valley.

The series features historians Stuart Peachey and Ruth Goodman, and archaeologists Alex Langlands, Peter Ginn and saddler Chloe Spencer.

The series was released on DVD, distributed by Acorn Media UK. An associated book by Stuart Peachey – The Building of the Green Valley: A Reconstruction of an Early 17th-century Rural Landscape – was published in 2006.

The sequel to this series is Victorian Farm, with Goodman, Langlands and Ginn returning as TV hosts.

== Episodes ==
No.	Title	Directed by	Original release date
1	"September"	Peter Sommer	19 August 2005
Ploughing with oxen, baking in a hearth.
2	"October"	Peter Sommer	26 August 2005
Gathering Black Worcester pears, thatching the cowshed roof with a bracken undercoat and a wheat thatch, period clothes and boots, driving pigs to forage.
3	"November"	Peter Sommer	2 September 2005
Slaughtering and butchering a pig, building a wattle and daub wall, harvesting medlars, salting a table, combing thatch and pegging it down, making hog's liver pudding.
4	"December"	Peter Sommer	9 September 2005
Building a hovel (a woodshed), period clothing, peas, preparing food (roast beef, chicken, a "Grand Salad", a marzipan pig's head, etc.) and drink (Wassail, "Lambs Wool" made from heated beer and stewed-apples, and "whisky beth" (made from any distilled spirit and choices of spices, such as licorice, anise, sugar, etc.)) for a Christmas feast.
5	"January"	Peter Sommer	16 September 2005
Preparing period medicines, wood gathering, hedge laying, making ink from oak apples, and rural home pharmacy (using a small brazier and an alembic).
6	"February"	Peter Sommer	23 September 2005
A heavy fall of snow, rebuilding an outdoor lavatory, checking the sheep in preparation for their health and for their upcoming lambing, period musical instruments, preparing a meal of fish and bagged puddings for Lent.
7	"March"	Peter Sommer	30 September 2005
Preparing the garden for sowing, wheat threshing, a trip to the miller (featuring the Melin Bompren mill, St Fagans National Museum of History), brewing March beer, pig yokes, fun and games, egg and pear pie with stewed salt cod.
8	"April"	Peter Sommer	7 October 2005
Spring cleaning, rebuilding a dry stone wall, a new calf.
9	"May"	Peter Sommer	14 October 2005
Preparing a new field for spring sowing, making charcoal, and butter.
10	"June"	Peter Sommer	21 October 2005
Washing and shearing sheep (and sampling "sheep washer's posset"), cheese making, and mid-summer revels.
11	"July"	Peter Sommer	28 October 2005
New harvest from the garden (beans and gooseberries), making hay and potash lye, clothes washing.
12	"August"	Peter Sommer	4 November 2005
Fattening geese, goose pie and carrot puree, wheat and straw harvest, reed lights.

== Sequels ==
A Tudor Feast at Christmas – a "spin-off" from the series, broadcast on 21 December 2006, produced and directed by Chris Mitchell for Lion Television – showed the team recreating a Tudor banquet at Haddon Hall with experts Marc Meltonville and Hugh Beamish.

A new series set in the 19th century, Victorian Farm, was screened on BBC Two in January 2009 and was followed by Edwardian Farm in November 2010. A series set during the Second World War, titled Wartime Farm, followed in September 2012, with Tudor Monastery Farm then premièring in November 2013.
