= Victorian Pharmacy =

- Starring: Ruth Goodman; Professor Nick Barber; Tom Quick
- Narrated by: Steven Noonan
- Country of origin: United Kingdom
- No. of series: 1
- No. of episodes: 4

Production
- Producers: Cassie Braben; David Upshal
- Running time: 60 minutes
- Production company: Lion Television

Original release
- Network: BBC Two
- Release: 15 July – 12 August 2010

Victorian Pharmacy is a historical documentary TV series in four parts, first shown on BBC Two in July 2010. It was made for the BBC by independent production company Lion Television. The series producer was Cassie Braben and the Executive Producer was David Upshal. It was filmed at Blists Hill Victorian Town in Shropshire. It is a historical documentary that looks at life in the 19th century and how people attempted to cure common ailments. Since some of the ingredients of Victorian remedies are now either illegal or known to be dangerous, Professor Nick Barber often used his modern pharmaceutical knowledge to produce similar products without those ingredients. The other main presenters were Tom Quick, a PhD student, and Ruth Goodman, a domestic historian who also appeared in Tales from the Green Valley, Victorian Farm and Edwardian Farm.

== Episodes ==
=== Episode 1 ===
First broadcast 15 July 2010 at 21:00. The first episode is set in 1837. It was made clear that the series would not be using opium, which was commonly used by pharmacists during the Victorian era. A world where traditional remedies, such as leeches, oil of earthworm and potions laced with cannabis and opium, held sway. After sampling some of the old ways, the team ventured into new discoveries, such as the Malvern water cure, the bronchial kettle for curing coughs, and the invention of Indian tonic water.

=== Episode 2 ===
First broadcast 22 July 2010 at 21:00. The team took on the challenges of the 1850s and 1860s, a time when overcrowded and unsanitary living conditions had reached their peak, leading to unprecedented outbreaks of disease. 'Cure all' medicines which promised to cure virtually everything, were all the rage and the team made their own out of rhubarb, liquorice, soap and syrup. They also ventured into the uncertain world of electrotherapy and found out how the discovery of germs made disinfectants a bestseller.

=== Episode 3 ===
First broadcast 5 August 2010 at 21:00. The pharmacy entered a period of new inventions and new laws. In 1868 pharmacies were regulated by law for the very first time - and Ruth, Tom and Nick faced a taste of the tough examinations pharmacists went through to become qualified.

They also explored the world of poisons and hazards that were completely unregulated until this time - from arsenic and opium to explosives. But the lack of restrictions they had enjoyed enabled 'experimental chemists' to invent products ranging from matches to fireworks, to custard and jelly. The team learned the processes involved in each, and laid on a Victorian style firework display for their customers.

=== Episode 4 ===
First broadcast 12 August 2010 at 21:00. The last programme in the series saw Ruth, Tom and Nick continue with Barber and Goodman's Pharmacy through to the end of the Victorian era.

Tom branched out into photography and dentistry using the latest technology, such as the foot-pedal dental drill. Ruth made condoms out of sheep intestines. Nick produced salicylic acid (a precursor to aspirin) which was tested orally and as a cure for corns along the way. And for those customers who liked a little pampering, the team turned their hands to making their very own brand of perfume.

As they shut up shop for the last time, the team reflected on a revolution in public healthcare that put a chemist's shop in every town in the country.

In 2011, BBC2 repeated the series but split into 8 shorter, 30-minute episodes.
