= Peter Ginn =

British archaeologist

- Born: 1978 (age 47–48)
- Other names: Fonz, Fonzy
- Occupation: Television presenter
- Notable work: BBC Farm series

Peter Ginn is a British archaeologist, best known as a presenter of the BBC educational television documentary series (2005–2014) known as the BBC historic farm series. Ginn and Ruth Goodman were the only presenters to appear in every Farm series, although he did not appear in the related Victorian Pharmacy. His later television work includes Secrets of the Castle (2014) and Full Steam Ahead (2016).

Peter said in the first episode of the Christmas special series of Victorian Farm that he grew up in Germany. Ginn grew up in Bodicote, Oxfordshire, and went to St John's RC Primary and Blessed George Napier Schools in Banbury. He studied Egyptian archaeology at the Institute of Archaeology, University College London. Ginn, or Fonz as he was generally called on the series, was added to the cast of the 2005 Tales from the Green Valley when his university friend Alex Langlands was injured. Peter and Alex met at PrimTech, which is a week where University of London students practice experimental archaeology.

Filmed	Broadcast	Title	Notes
Sep 2004 to Aug 2005	2005	Tales of the Green Valley	12 ep
X-Mas 2006	2006	A Tudor Feast at Christmas	3 ep
Sep 2007 to Aug 2008	2009	Victorian Farm	6 ep
X-Mas 2009	2010	Victorian Farm Christmas	3 ep
Sep 2010 to Aug 2011	2011	Edwardian Farm	12 ep
Before Christmas 2011 to 2012	2012	Wartime Farm	6 ep
2013 + X-Mas special	2013	Tudor Monastery Farm	
	2014	Secrets of the Castle	
	2016	Full Steam Ahead	6 ep

== Publications ==
- The Spoon: A Stirring History by Peter Ginn. Amberley Publishing, 2024.
- Slow Tech: The Perfect Antidote to Today's Digital World by Peter Ginn. Haynes Publishing, 2019.
- Full Steam Ahead: How the Railways Made Britain by Peter Ginn and Ruth Goodman. William Collins, 2016.
- Tudor Monastery Farm: Life in Rural England 500 Years Ago by Peter Ginn, Ruth Goodman and Tom Pinfold. BBC Books, 2013.
- Wartime Farm by Peter Ginn, Ruth Goodman and Alex Langlands. Mitchell Beazley, 2012.
- Victorian Farm: Rediscovering Forgotten Skills by Alex Langlands, Peter Ginn and Ruth Goodman. Pavilion, 2008.
