= Ouanne =

- Commune
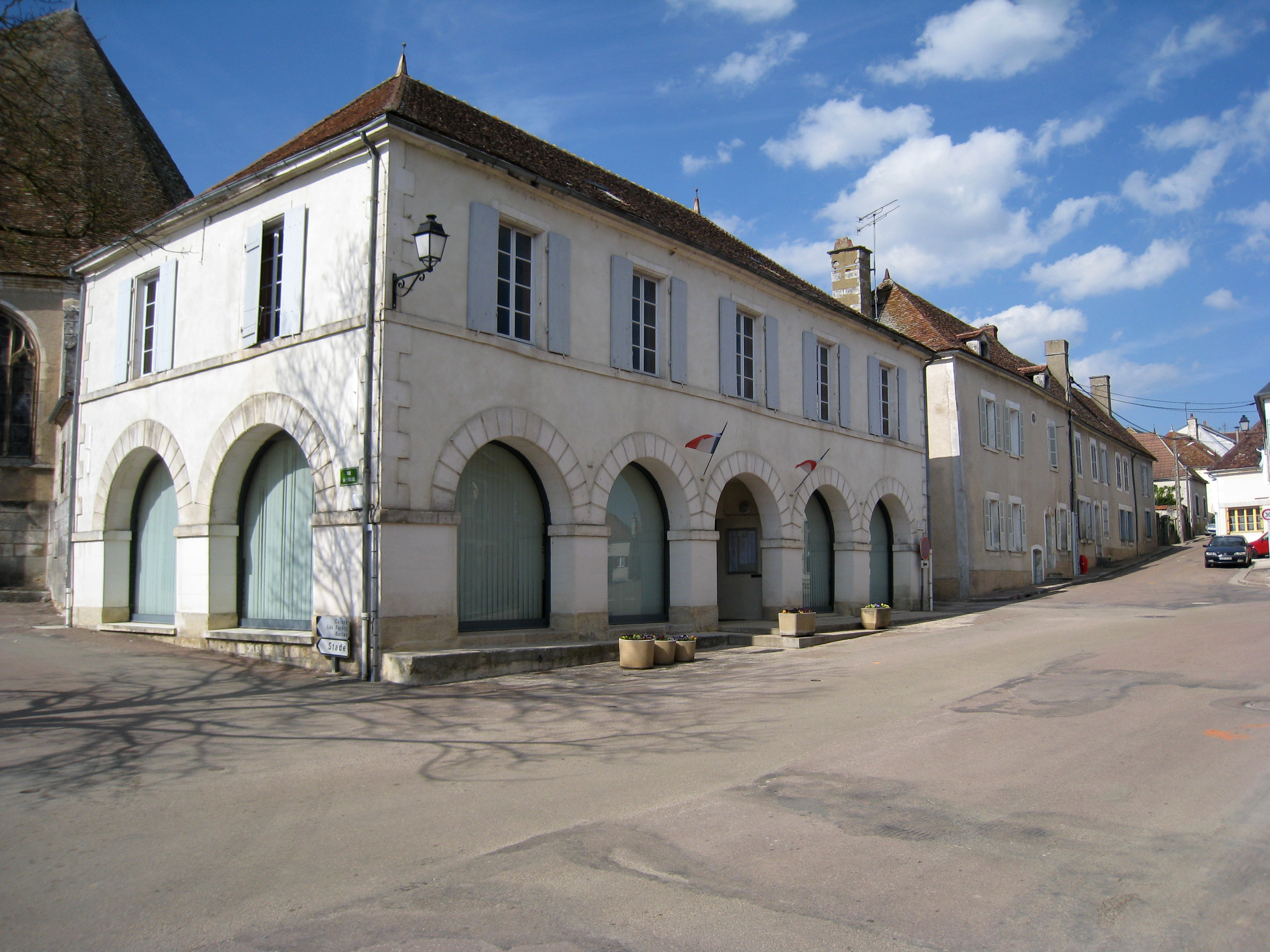
- Town hall

- Coat of arms
- Location of Ouanne
- Location within France Location within Bourgogne-Franche-Comté
- Coordinates: 47°39′45″N 3°25′09″E
- Country: France
- Region: Bourgogne-Franche-Comté
- Department: Yonne
- Arrondissement: Auxerre
- Canton: Vincelles

Government
  - Mayor (2020–2026): Catherine Cordier
- Area^{1}: 38.20 km^{2} (14.75 sq mi)
- Elevation: 314 m (1,030 ft)
- Highest elevation: 371 m (1,217 ft)
- Lowest elevation: 226 m (741 ft)
- Population (2023): 578
  - Density: 15.1/km^{2} (39.2/sq mi)
- Time zone: UTC+01:00 (CET)
  - Summer (DST): UTC+02:00 (CEST)
- INSEE/Postal code: 89283 /89560
- ^{1} French Land Register data, which excludes lakes, ponds, glaciers > 1 km^{2} (0.386 sq mi or 247 acres) and river estuaries.

Ouanne (French pronunciation: [wan]) is a commune in the Yonne department in Bourgogne-Franche-Comté in north-central France, in the natural region of Forterre.

== History ==
Ouanne existed in Gallo-Roman times under the name of Odouna or Oduna. A Roman way carried out in Auxerre. The ancient station of Ouanne is known from a marble fragment from the 3rd century, preserved at the museum of Autun. The marble indicates the distances on the Roman road from Auxerre to Entrains-sur-Nohain. The armies of Pippin the Younger passed along this road.

In 1790, Ouanne became the chief town of its canton, but the number of cantons was subsequently reduced and the village became attached to Courson-les-Carrières. In December 1972, Ouanne was merged with Merry-Sec and Chastenay. In January 1980, Merry-Sec became a separate commune again.

== Geography ==
The river Ouanne, an 84 km (52 mi) right tributary of the Loing, has its source in the commune.

== Demography ==
Inhabitants of Ouanne are known as Ouannais in French.

Historical population

Year	Pop.	±% p.a.
1793	1,019	—
1851	1,239	+0.34%
1881	1,054	−0.54%
1901	991	−0.31%
1931	720	−1.06%
1968	766	+0.17%
1975	649	−2.34%

Year	Pop.	±% p.a.
1982	589	−1.38%
1990	627	+0.78%
1999	661	+0.59%
2007	698	+0.68%
2012	635	−1.87%
2017	606	−0.93%
2023	578	−0.79%

Source: EHESS and INSEE (1968-2023)

== Places and monuments ==
- Notre-Dame Church (15th-16th centuries), blazing style, entirely arched
- Source de l'Ouanne (built in 1867), close to the laundrette
- Castle of the Mines (16th century)

== Personalities ==
- René Lepage de Ste-Claire

== See also ==
- Communes of the Yonne department
