= Druyes-les-Belles-Fontaines =

- Commune
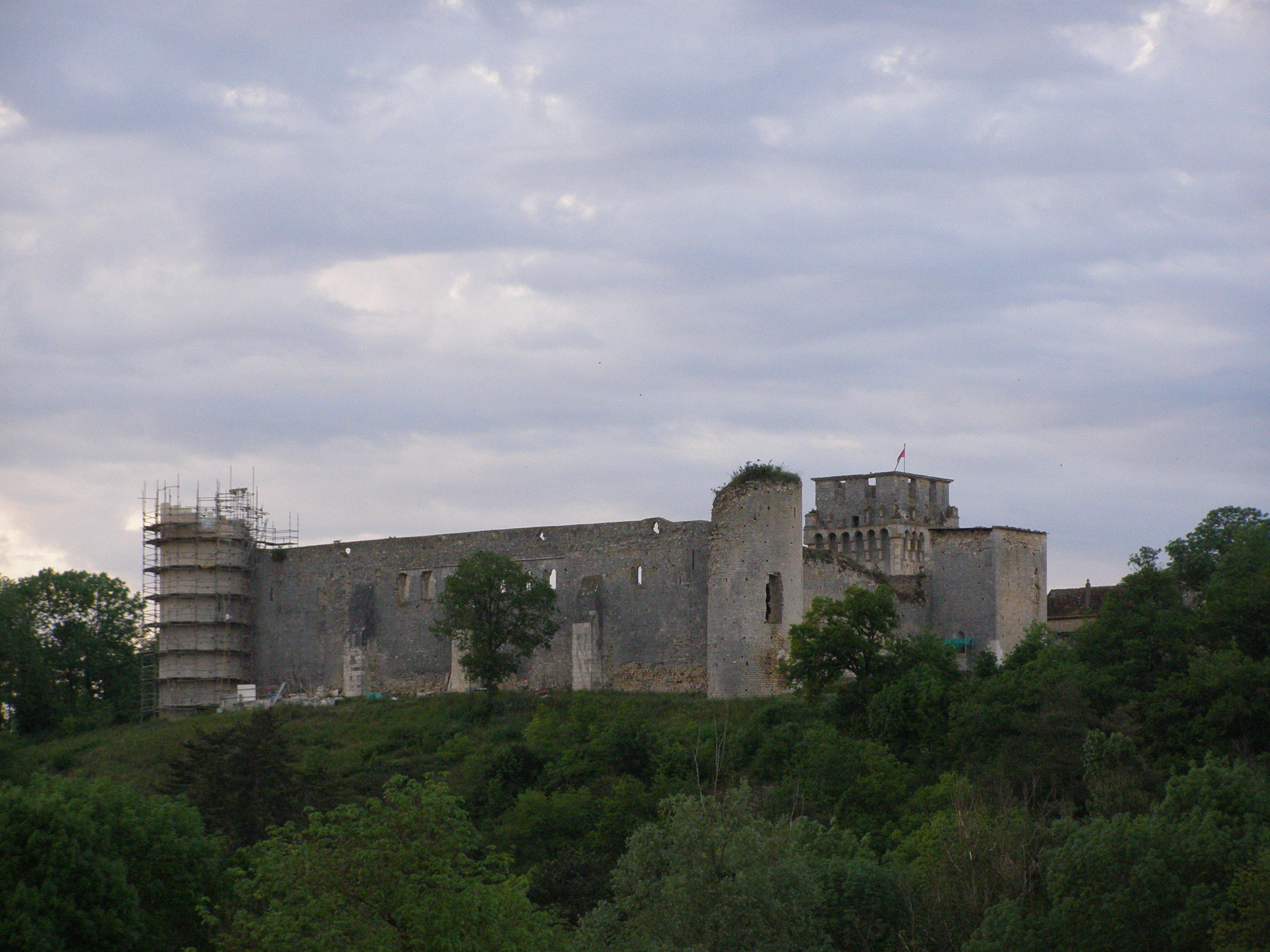
- Chateau of Druyes
- Location of Druyes-les-Belles-Fontaines
- Location within France Location within Bourgogne-Franche-Comté
- Coordinates: 47°32′54″N 3°25′16″E
- Country: France
- Region: Bourgogne-Franche-Comté
- Department: Yonne
- Arrondissement: Auxerre
- Canton: Vincelles

Government
  - Mayor (2020–2026): Jean-Michel Rigault
- Area^{1}: 39.48 km^{2} (15.24 sq mi)
- Highest elevation: 347 m (1,138 ft)
- Lowest elevation: 162 m (531 ft)
- Population (2023): 265
  - Density: 6.71/km^{2} (17.4/sq mi)
- Time zone: UTC+01:00 (CET)
  - Summer (DST): UTC+02:00 (CEST)
- INSEE/Postal code: 89148 /89560
- ^{1} French Land Register data, which excludes lakes, ponds, glaciers > 1 km^{2} (0.386 sq mi or 247 acres) and river estuaries.

Druyes-les-Belles-Fontaines (French pronunciation: [dʁɥi le bɛl fɔ̃tɛn]) is a commune in the Yonne department in Bourgogne-Franche-Comté in north-central France, in the natural region of Forterre.

It is well known for several historic monuments including the ruins of the château de Druyes, the city gate, the Romanesque church of Druyes-les-Belles-Fontaines, and the lavoir.

== See also ==
- Communes of the Yonne department
