= Charentenay =

- Commune
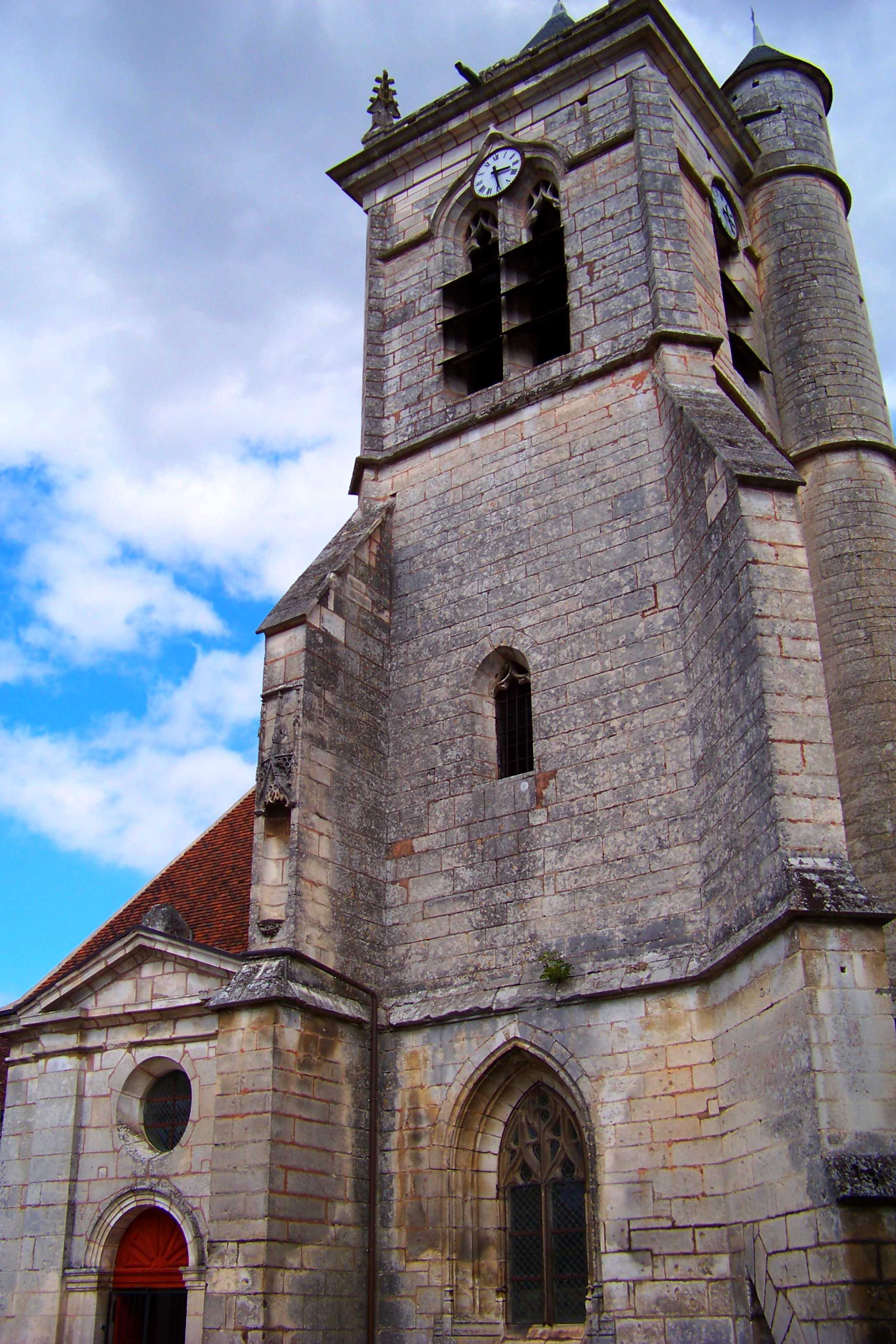
- The church in Charentenay
- Location of Charentenay
- Location within France Location within Bourgogne-Franche-Comté
- Coordinates: 47°39′03″N 3°32′46″E
- Country: France
- Region: Bourgogne-Franche-Comté
- Department: Yonne
- Arrondissement: Auxerre
- Canton: Vincelles

Government
  - Mayor (2020–2026): Gilles Houblin
- Area^{1}: 14.64 km^{2} (5.65 sq mi)
- Highest elevation: 337 m (1,106 ft)
- Lowest elevation: 168 m (551 ft)
- Population (2023): 288
  - Density: 19.7/km^{2} (51.0/sq mi)
- Time zone: UTC+01:00 (CET)
  - Summer (DST): UTC+02:00 (CEST)
- INSEE/Postal code: 89084 /89580
- ^{1} French Land Register data, which excludes lakes, ponds, glaciers > 1 km^{2} (0.386 sq mi or 247 acres) and river estuaries.

Charentenay (French pronunciation: [ʃaʁɑ̃tnɛ]) is a commune in the Yonne department in Bourgogne-Franche-Comté in north-central France, in the natural region of Forterre.

== See also ==
- Communes of the Yonne department
