= Sainpuits =

- Commune
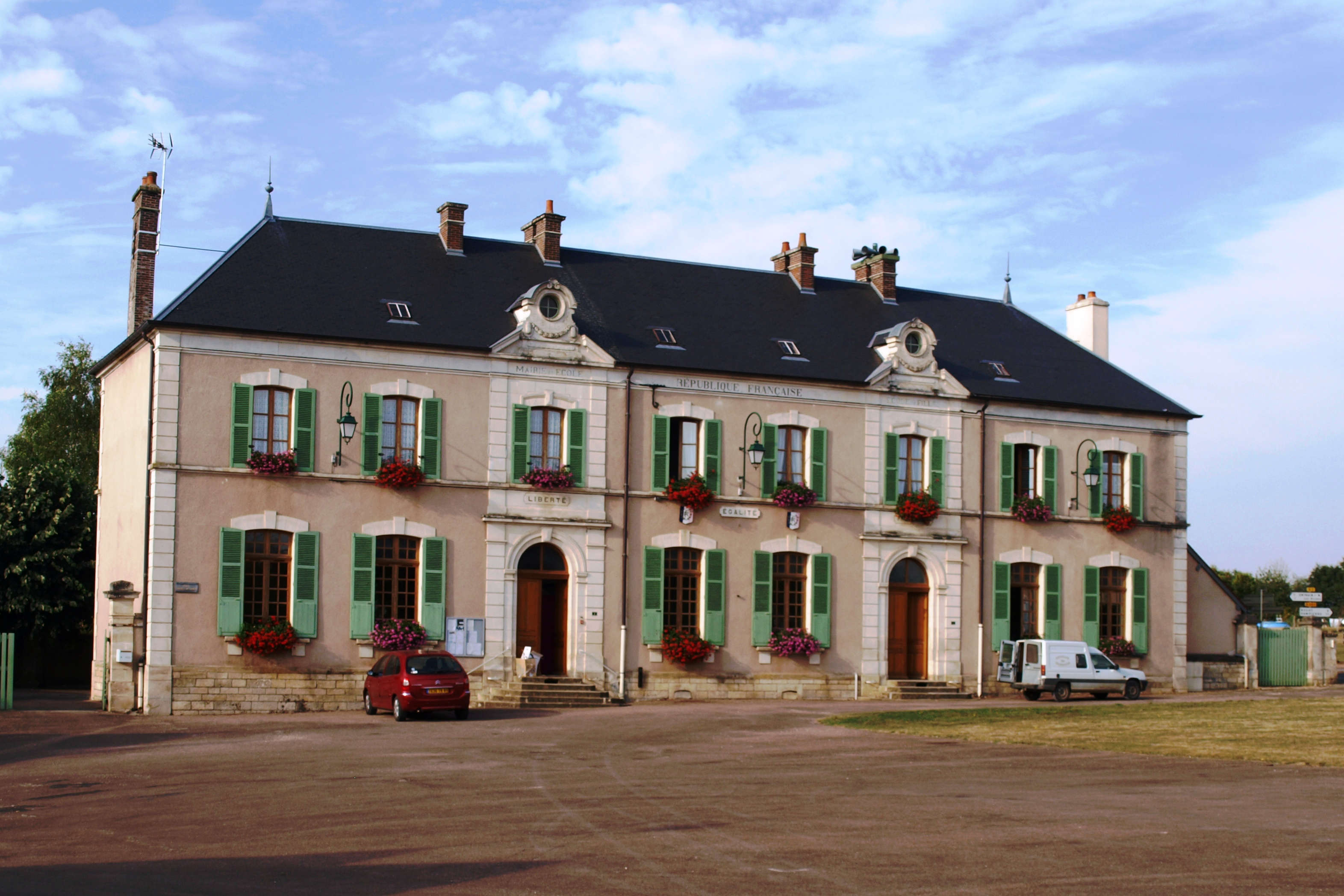
- The town hall in Sainpuits

- Coat of arms
- Location of Sainpuits
- Location within France Location within Bourgogne-Franche-Comté
- Coordinates: 47°31′08″N 3°15′36″E
- Country: France
- Region: Bourgogne-Franche-Comté
- Department: Yonne
- Arrondissement: Auxerre
- Canton: Vincelles

Government
  - Mayor (2020–2026): Denis Pouillot
- Area^{1}: 22.84 km^{2} (8.82 sq mi)
- Highest elevation: 306 m (1,004 ft)
- Lowest elevation: 217 m (712 ft)
- Population (2023): 280
  - Density: 12/km^{2} (32/sq mi)
- Time zone: UTC+01:00 (CET)
  - Summer (DST): UTC+02:00 (CEST)
- INSEE/Postal code: 89331 /89520
- ^{1} French Land Register data, which excludes lakes, ponds, glaciers > 1 km^{2} (0.386 sq mi or 247 acres) and river estuaries.

Sainpuits (French pronunciation: [sɛ̃pɥi]) is a commune in the north-central department of Yonne, in the natural region of Forterre.

== See also ==
- Communes of the Yonne department
