= Migé =

- Commune
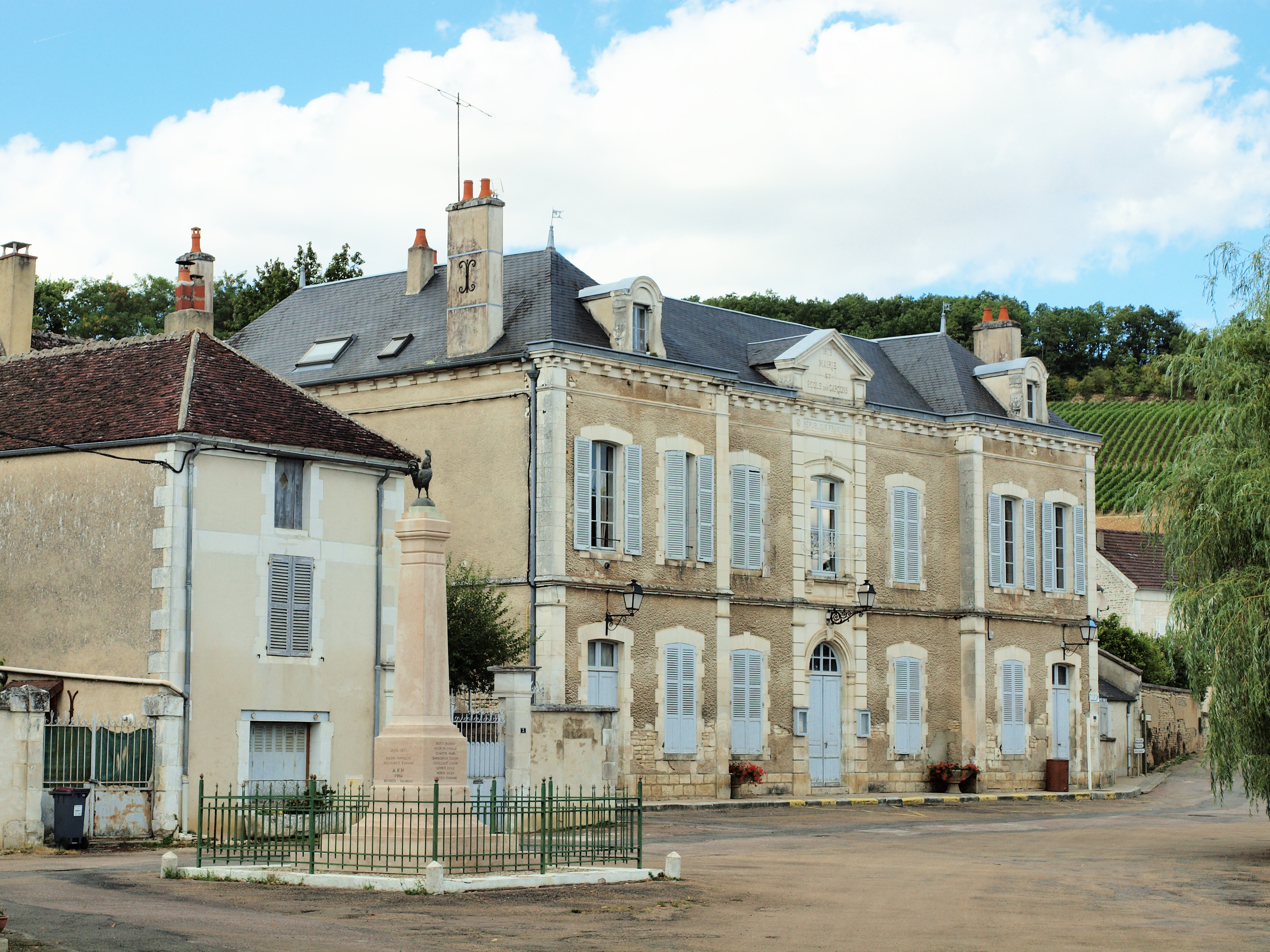
- The town hall in Migé
- Location of Migé
- Location within France Location within Bourgogne-Franche-Comté
- Coordinates: 47°40′33″N 3°32′39″E
- Country: France
- Region: Bourgogne-Franche-Comté
- Department: Yonne
- Arrondissement: Auxerre
- Canton: Vincelles

Government
  - Mayor (2020–2026): Yannick Cordet
- Area^{1}: 14.62 km^{2} (5.64 sq mi)
- Highest elevation: 327 m (1,073 ft)
- Lowest elevation: 178 m (584 ft)
- Population (2023): 384
  - Density: 26.3/km^{2} (68.0/sq mi)
- Time zone: UTC+01:00 (CET)
  - Summer (DST): UTC+02:00 (CEST)
- INSEE/Postal code: 89256 /89580
- ^{1} French Land Register data, which excludes lakes, ponds, glaciers > 1 km^{2} (0.386 sq mi or 247 acres) and river estuaries.

Migé (French pronunciation: [miʒe]) is a commune in the Yonne department in Bourgogne-Franche-Comté in north-central France, in the natural region of Forterre.

== See also ==
- Communes of the Yonne department
