= Levis, Yonne =

Levis
- Commune
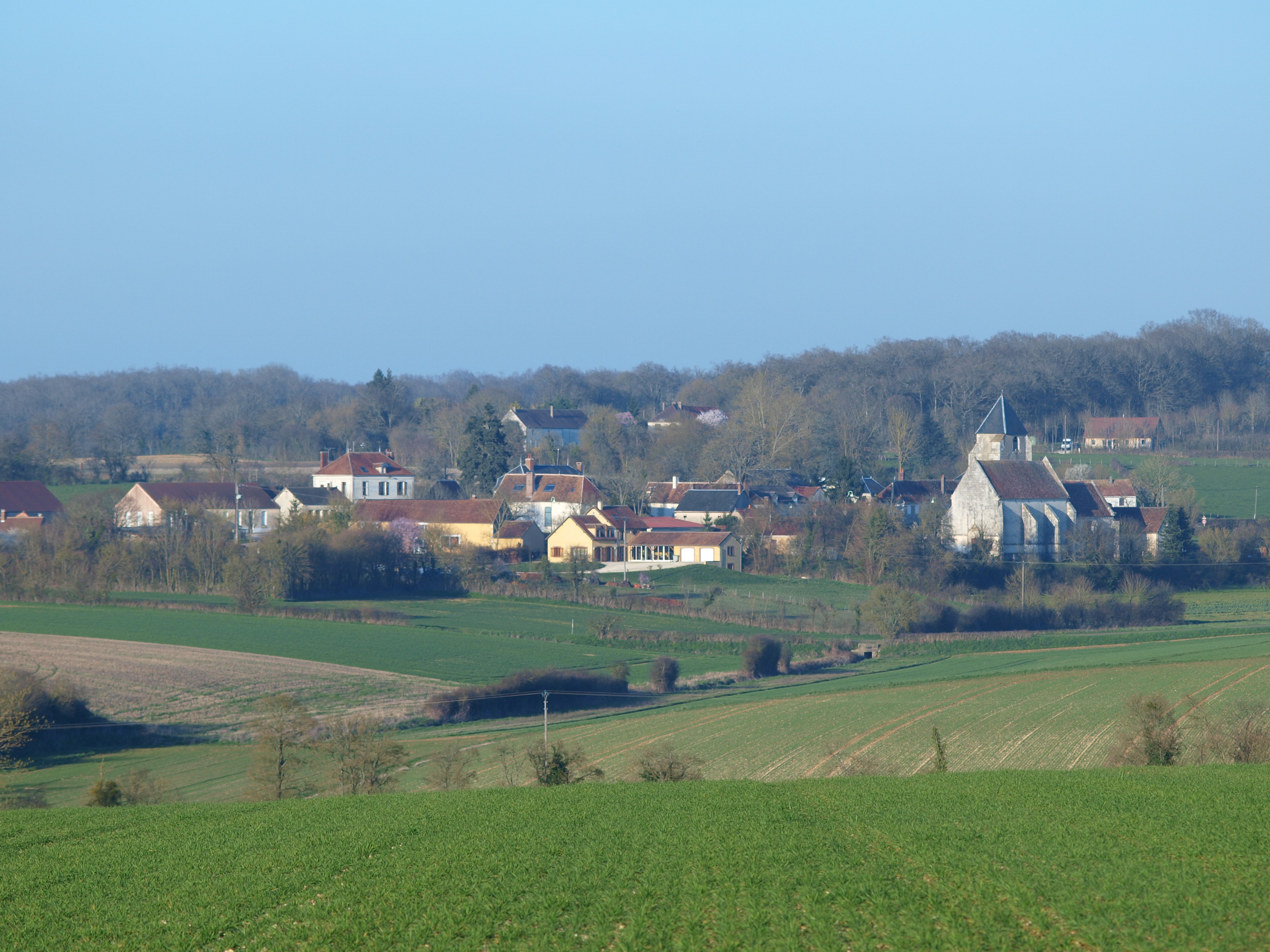
- A general view of Levis

- Coat of arms
- Location of Levis
- Location within France Location within Bourgogne-Franche-Comté
- Coordinates: 47°39′15″N 3°19′32″E
- Country: France
- Region: Bourgogne-Franche-Comté
- Department: Yonne
- Arrondissement: Auxerre
- Canton: Vincelles
- Area^{1}: 12.08 km^{2} (4.66 sq mi)
- Highest elevation: 300 m (980 ft)
- Lowest elevation: 208 m (682 ft)
- Population (2023): 223
  - Density: 18.5/km^{2} (47.8/sq mi)
- Time zone: UTC+01:00 (CET)
  - Summer (DST): UTC+02:00 (CEST)
- INSEE/Postal code: 89222 /89520
- ^{1} French Land Register data, which excludes lakes, ponds, glaciers > 1 km^{2} (0.386 sq mi or 247 acres) and river estuaries.

Levis is a commune in the Yonne department in Bourgogne-Franche-Comté in north-central France. It lies on the boundary between the natural regions of Puisaye and Forterre.

== See also ==
- Communes of the Yonne department
