= Bouhy =

- Commune
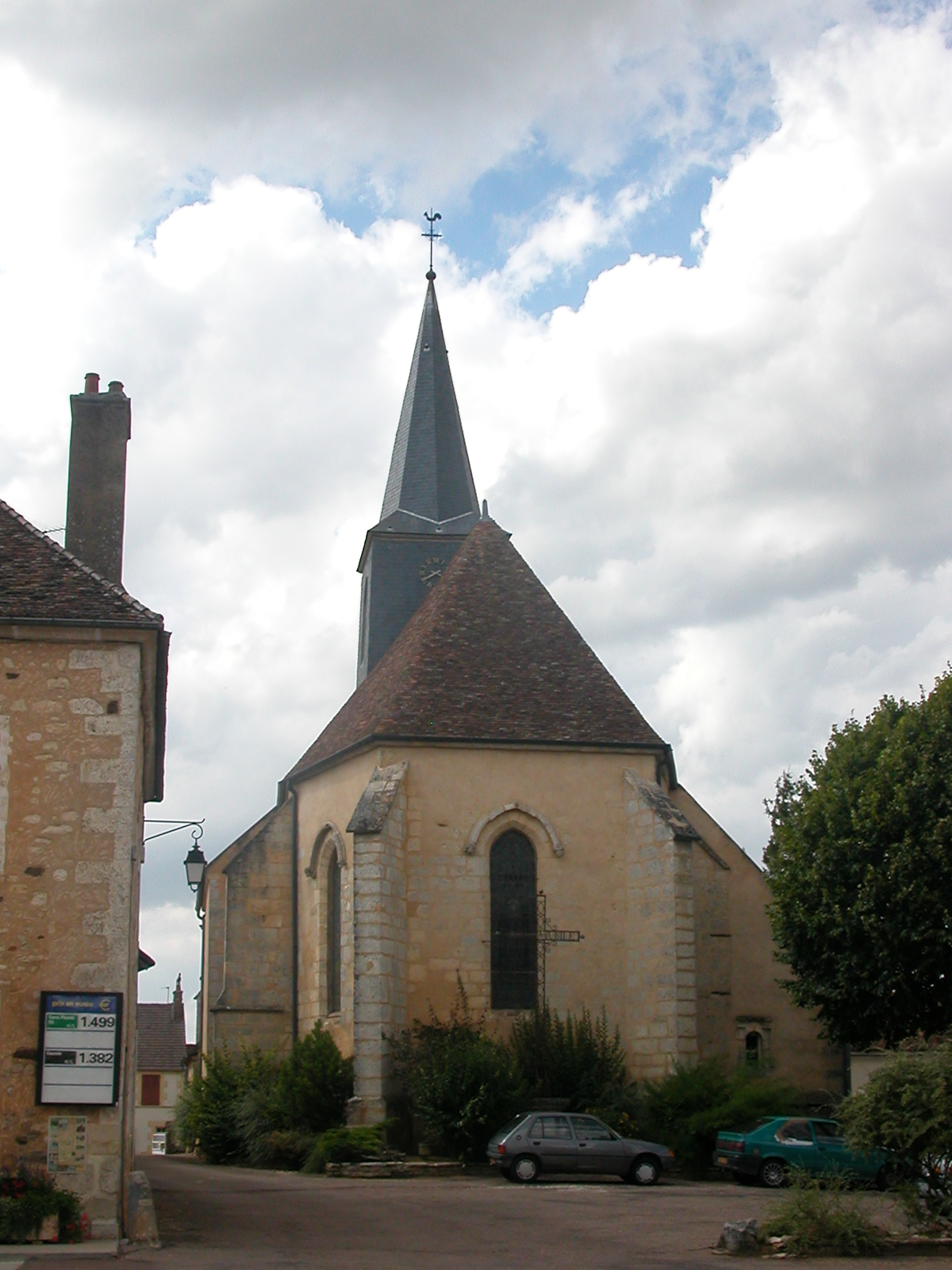
- The church in Bouhy
- Location of Bouhy
- Location within France Location within Bourgogne-Franche-Comté
- Coordinates: 47°29′11″N 3°09′58″E
- Country: France
- Region: Bourgogne-Franche-Comté
- Department: Nièvre
- Arrondissement: Cosne-Cours-sur-Loire
- Canton: Pouilly-sur-Loire
- Intercommunality: CC Puisaye-Forterre

Government
  - Mayor (2022–2026): Jean-Louis Champagnat
- Area^{1}: 36.37 km^{2} (14.04 sq mi)
- Highest elevation: 352 m (1,155 ft)
- Lowest elevation: 220 m (720 ft)
- Population (2023): 410
  - Density: 11/km^{2} (29/sq mi)
- Time zone: UTC+01:00 (CET)
  - Summer (DST): UTC+02:00 (CEST)
- INSEE/Postal code: 58036 /58310
- ^{1} French Land Register data, which excludes lakes, ponds, glaciers > 1 km^{2} (0.386 sq mi or 247 acres) and river estuaries.

Bouhy (French pronunciation: [bu.i]) is a commune in the Nièvre department in central France, in the natural region of Forterre.

== Population ==
Historical population
Year	Pop.	±% p.a.
1968	750	—
1975	667	−1.66%
1982	578	−2.03%
1990	495	−1.92%
1999	469	−0.60%
2007	463	−0.16%
2012	448	−0.66%
2017	460	+0.53%
2023	410	−1.90%
Source: INSEE

== See also ==
- Communes of the Nièvre department
