= Andryes =

- Commune
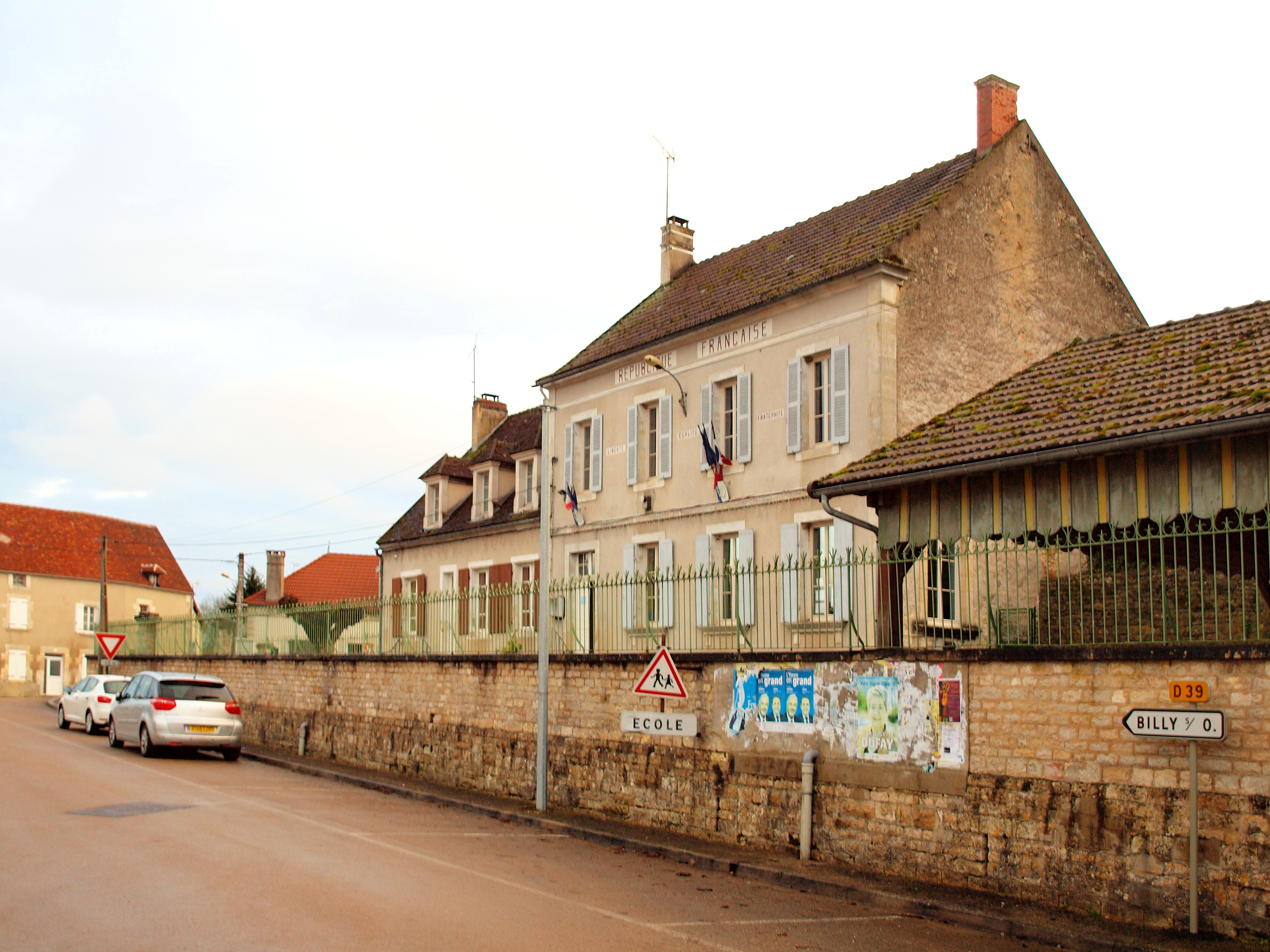
- The town hall and school in Andryes
- Location of Andryes
- Location within France Location within Bourgogne-Franche-Comté
- Coordinates: 47°31′11″N 3°29′12″E
- Country: France
- Region: Bourgogne-Franche-Comté
- Department: Yonne
- Arrondissement: Auxerre
- Canton: Vincelles
- Intercommunality: Puisaye-Forterre

Government
  - Mayor (2020–2026): Jean-Marc Leger
- Area^{1}: 29.79 km^{2} (11.50 sq mi)
- Highest elevation: 275 m (902 ft)
- Lowest elevation: 155 m (509 ft)
- Population (2023): 450
  - Density: 15/km^{2} (39/sq mi)
- Time zone: UTC+01:00 (CET)
  - Summer (DST): UTC+02:00 (CEST)
- INSEE/Postal code: 89007 /89480
- ^{1} French Land Register data, which excludes lakes, ponds, glaciers > 1 km^{2} (0.386 sq mi or 247 acres) and river estuaries.

Andryes (French pronunciation: [ɑ̃dʁi]) is a commune in the Yonne department in Bourgogne-Franche-Comté in north-central France, in the natural region of Forterre.

== See also ==
- Communes of the Yonne department
