= Forterre =

Coordinates: 47.56°N 3.35°E

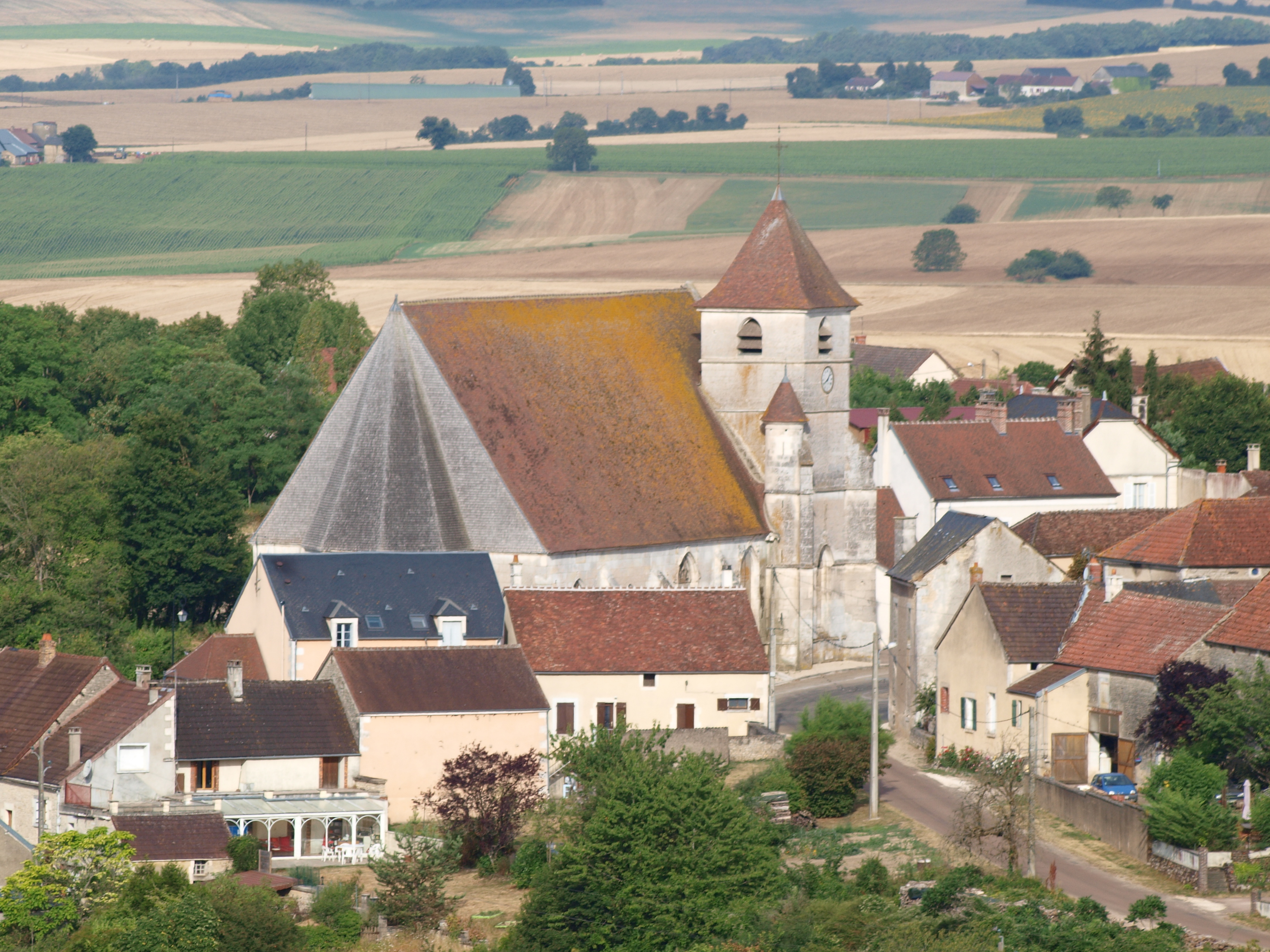
- Landscape of Forterre with the village of Taingy in the foreground
- Interactive map of Forterre
- Country: France
- Région: Bourgogne-Franche-Comté
- Départements: Nièvre, Yonne
- Arrondissements: Cosne-Cours-sur-Loire, Auxerre

The Forterre (French pronunciation: [fɔʁtɛʁ]) is a small natural region on the western edge of the French region of Bourgogne-Franche-Comté.

== Name ==
The name Forterre is a contraction of forte terre, "strong earth".

== Geography ==
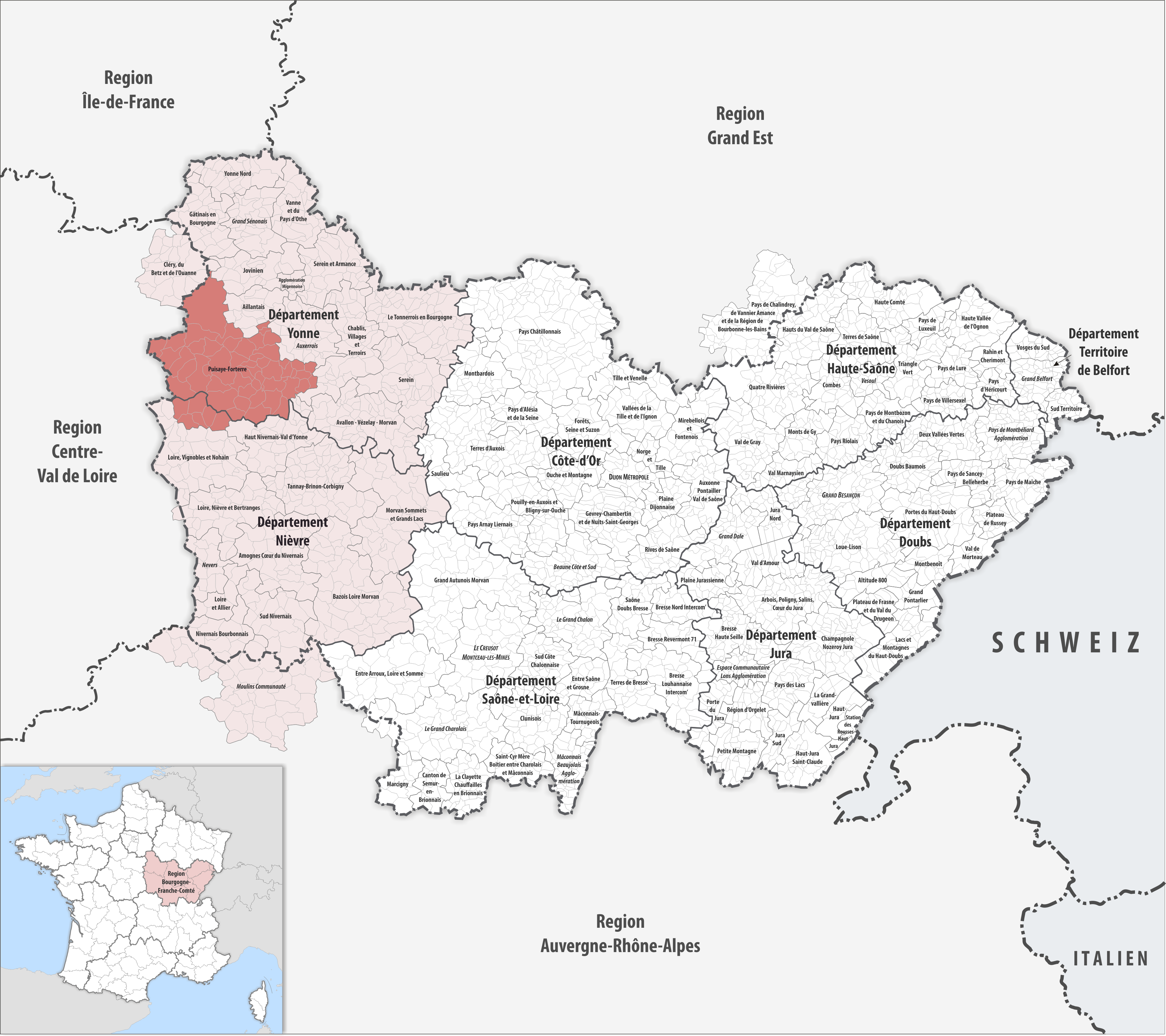
The communauté de communes de Puisaye-Forterre shown in darker red within the region of Bourgogne-Franche-Comté

The Forterre is neighbored by the Puisaye to the west and northwest, the Auxerrois to the northeast, the Yonne river valley to the east, and the hills of Nivernais to the south.

Its main town is Courson-les-Carrières. Significant villages include Bouhy, Druyes-les-Belles-Fontaines, Etais-la-Sauvin, Ouanne, and Thury.

It is traversed by the water divide between the respective catchment areas of the Loire and the Seine. The Loing, a significant tributary of the Seine, has its source in the Forterre, in Sainte-Colombe-sur-Loing.

Today Forterre is bypassed by major infrastructures, but that was not always the case. The local topography still has traces of the Roman road between Auxerre (Autissiodorum) and Entrains-sur-Nohain (Intaranum), and of a 19th-century railroad, the Triguères-Surgy Line, most of which was dismantled in 1943 by German occupation forces to supply rails to the Russian front. The viaduct of Druyes is the railroad's most spectacular local legacy.

Forterre's terrain is comparatively dry and stands in contrast to the neighboring Puisaye with its lakes, rivers and forests.

Lying mid-way between Sancerre and Chablis, it used to be a wine-producing region. One late-medieval chronicle records a vineyard planted in the 1450s in Perreuse by Antoine de Chabannes, lord of Puisaye. The Forterre's grapevines, however, were ravaged by the early-20th-century outbreak of phylloxera. Recent attempts have been made to revive wine production, with grapes including Pinot noir, César, Pinot gris, Chardonnay, Pinot blanc and Sauvignon blanc.

== Administration ==
Apart from its southwestern tip (Bouhy) in the département of Nièvre, the Forterre's territory is overwhelmingly in the Yonne département, and within it in the canton of Vincelles following the cantonal redistricting round of 2015. The same canton also includes parts of the Puisaye to the west of the Forterre, and of the Yonne valley to its east including its seat in Vincelles.

All of Forterre lies within the Communauté de communes de Puisaye-Forterre, established on 1 January 2017, of which it constitutes the southeastern third.

Together with neighboring Puisaye, Forterre has always been a borderland between different counties, provinces and later administrative regions within France. In the High Middle Ages it was on the border between the counties of Nevers and Auxerre. During the Hundred Years' War it found itself between the warring duchies of Berry and Burgundy in the Armagnac–Burgundian Civil War, then at the intersection between the respective domains of Charles VII and Henry VI as rival claimants to the French throne and of Duke Philip the Good of Burgundy. By the end of the Ancien Régime the Forterre was divided between Orléanais, Nivernais and the Duchy of Burgundy, with Champagne immediately to the north.

== History ==
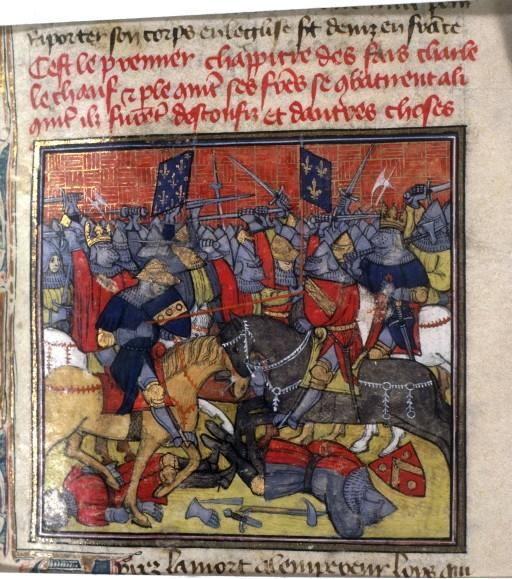
The Battle of Fontenoy (841) illustrated in the 14th-century Grandes Chroniques de France

The territory of the Forterre was Christianized in late antiquity. Some villages are traditionally associated with late-Antiquity saints, e.g. Mamertinus or Mammert in Perreuse and Romanus or Romain in Druyes. A Carolingian manuscript lists several Forterre parishes on the itinerary of Saint Aunarius, Bishop of Auxerre in the late 6th century, namely Courson-les-Carrières (Curcedonus), Druyes (Drogia), Bouhy (Balgiacus), Thury (Tauriacus), Levis (Livadiacus), and Ouanne (Odona).

In 841, the Battle of Fontenoy was fought mostly in western Forterre. Memories of the battle survive in a number of local place names. One example is the wood of Roichat near Thury, named after King Charles the Bald (roi Charles) who stayed there before the battle. A memorial obelisk was erected in 1860 near the village of Fontenoy at the initiative of local scholar Claude-Étienne Chaillou des Barres.

In the 12th and early 13th century, the Forterre was dominated by the Capetian House of Courtenay, a branch of France's royal family. The Courtenays, several of which became Emperors of Constantinople, built the Château de Druyes in Druyes-les-Belles-Fontaines, now one of the region's foremost landmarks.

The Forterre suffered severe depopulation and decline during the Crisis of the Late Middle Ages, and renewal from the second half of the 15th century. Many village churches were entirely rebuilt at that time, which now constitute what is arguably the region's most characteristic architecture. Several of these churches have ornate portals and/or prominent towers, e.g. in Charentenay, Ouanne, Sainpuits, Sougères, Taingy, and Thury. This period of dynamism and prosperity, however, ended in the time of the French Wars of Religion.

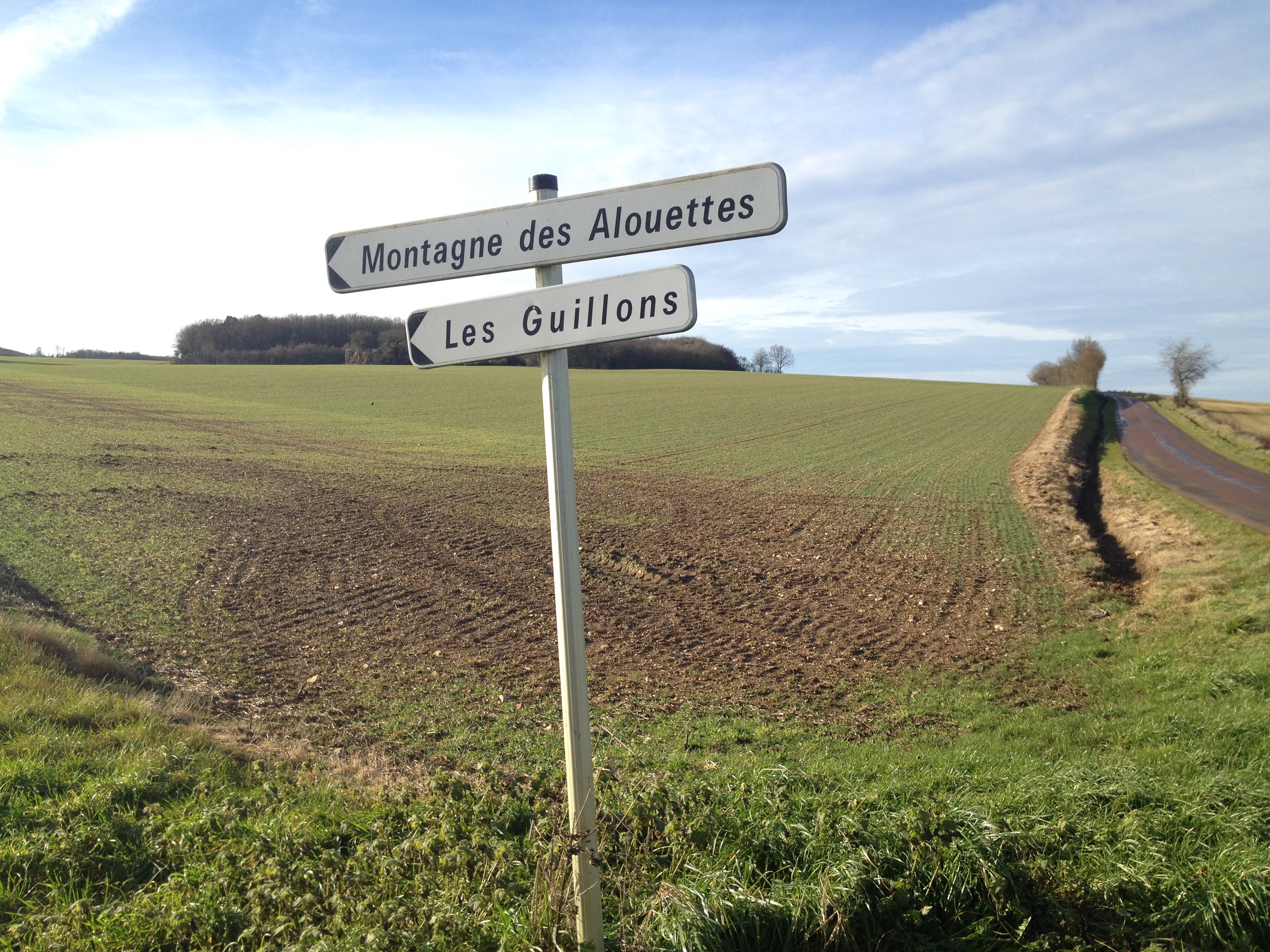
The Montagne des Alouettes was briefly a stronghold of the French resistance in the summer of 1944

The Forterre was briefly occupied by Coalition forces in the summer of 1815, and more durably by German forces in 1940–1944. An armed résistance group or maquis was established on the Montagne des Alouettes near Sougères-en-Puisaye, for a month between late July 1944 and the region's liberation in late August. About 250-strong, the group had weapons parachuted by Allied planes.

The history of the Forterre, especially its western part, is interwoven with that of the neighboring Puisaye. In the 15th and early 16th centuries, some of its villages such as Thury belonged to the Lordship of Puisaye. In 1955, the village of Sougères-les-Simon changed its name to Sougères-en-Puisaye, despite this being a misnomer if Puisaye is taken as the distinct geographical region to the northwest.

== Personalities connected to the Forterre ==
- Saint Mamertinus of Auxerre (d. ca. 462), monk and abbot, born in Perreuse
- Saint Romanus of Subiaco (d. ca. 550–560), monk and associate of Benedict of Nursia, who founded a monastery and died in Druyes-les-Belles-Fontaines
- Audebert de Montmorillon (11th century), monk at the priory of Andryes who later became Archbishop of Bourges
- Peter II of Courtenay (d. 1219), Emperor of the Latin Empire who departed to Constantinople (which he never reached) from his castle in Druyes-les-Belles-Fontaines
- Matilda I, Countess of Nevers (1188-1257), daughter of Peter II who married Hervé IV of Donzy and later Guigues IV of Forez, also often resided in the castle of Druyes
- René Lepage de Sainte-Claire (1656-1718), founder of Rimouski in Quebec, born in Ouanne
- Jean-Roch Coignet (1776-1865), soldier and memorialist from Druyes-les-Belles-Fontaines
- Claude-Étienne Chaillou des Barres (1784-1857), administrator and scholar, who renovated his family's Château des Barres and cofounded the Société des sciences historiques et naturelles de l'Yonne in 1847
- Auguste Dusautoy (1810-1873), entrepreneur and politician from Courson-les-Carrières
- Jules Valton (1867-1941), sailor from Courson-les-Carrières who represented France at the 1900 Summer Olympics
- Fernand Clas (1868-1935), regionalist author from Leugny who wrote poems in the local patois
- Henri Jobier (1879-1930), fencer from Courson-les-Carrières who won a gold medal in the foil competition at the 1924 Summer Olympics
- Arthur Rennert (1904-1983), Polish-born visual artist who settled and died in Lainsecq
- Gérard Vée (1912-1986), resistant and politician from Sainpuits
- Jean Bertin (1917-1975), scientist and inventor from Druyes-les-Belles-Fontaines, lead engineer for the French experimental Aérotrain mass transit system
- Yvette Szczupak-Thomas (1929-2003), painter and author from Pesselières near Sougères-en-Puisaye
- Paulette Perec (1938-2016), librarian and curator from Sougères-en-Puisaye, wife of Georges Perec

== Selected sights ==
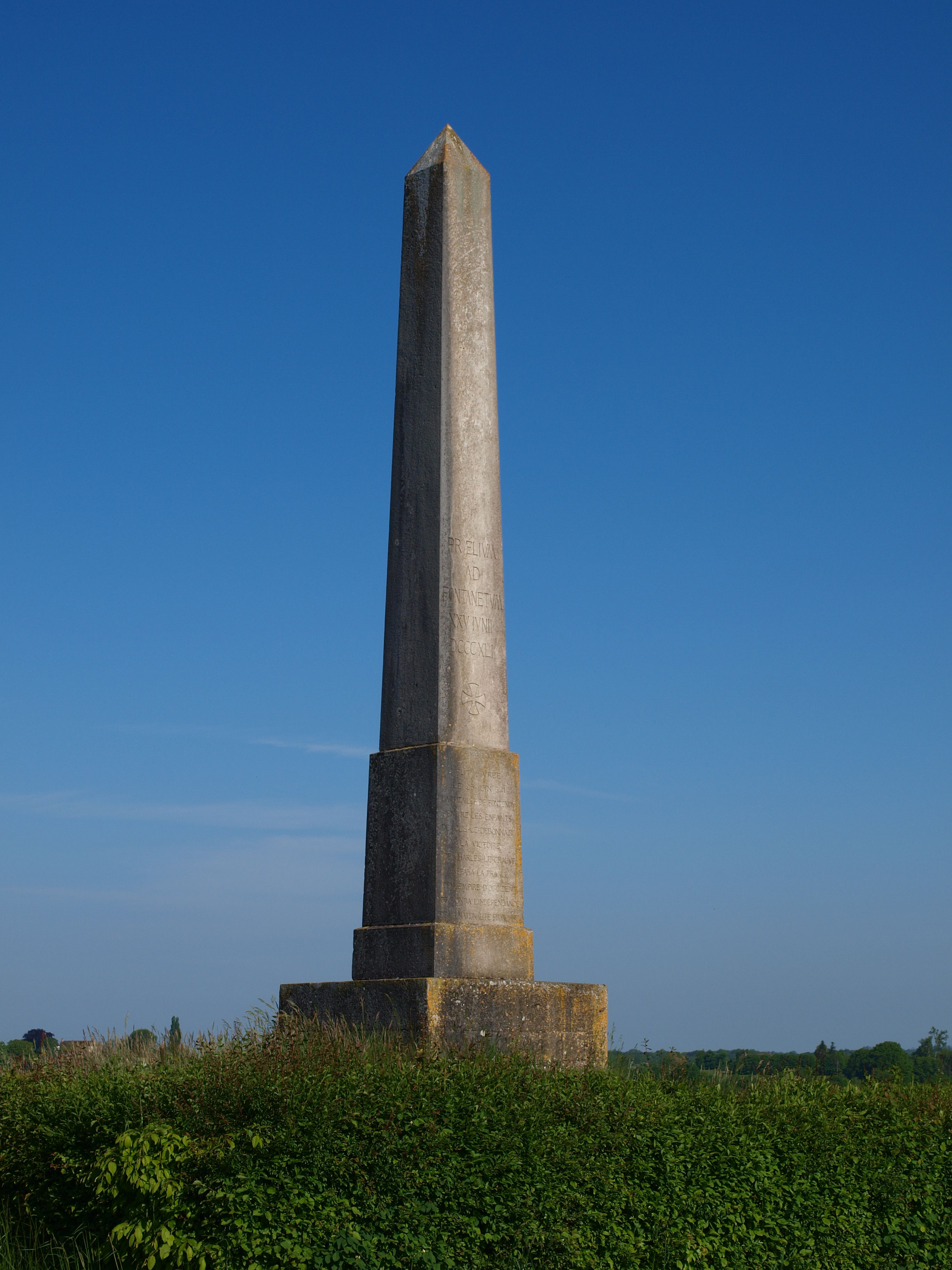
Memorial of the Battle of Fontenoy

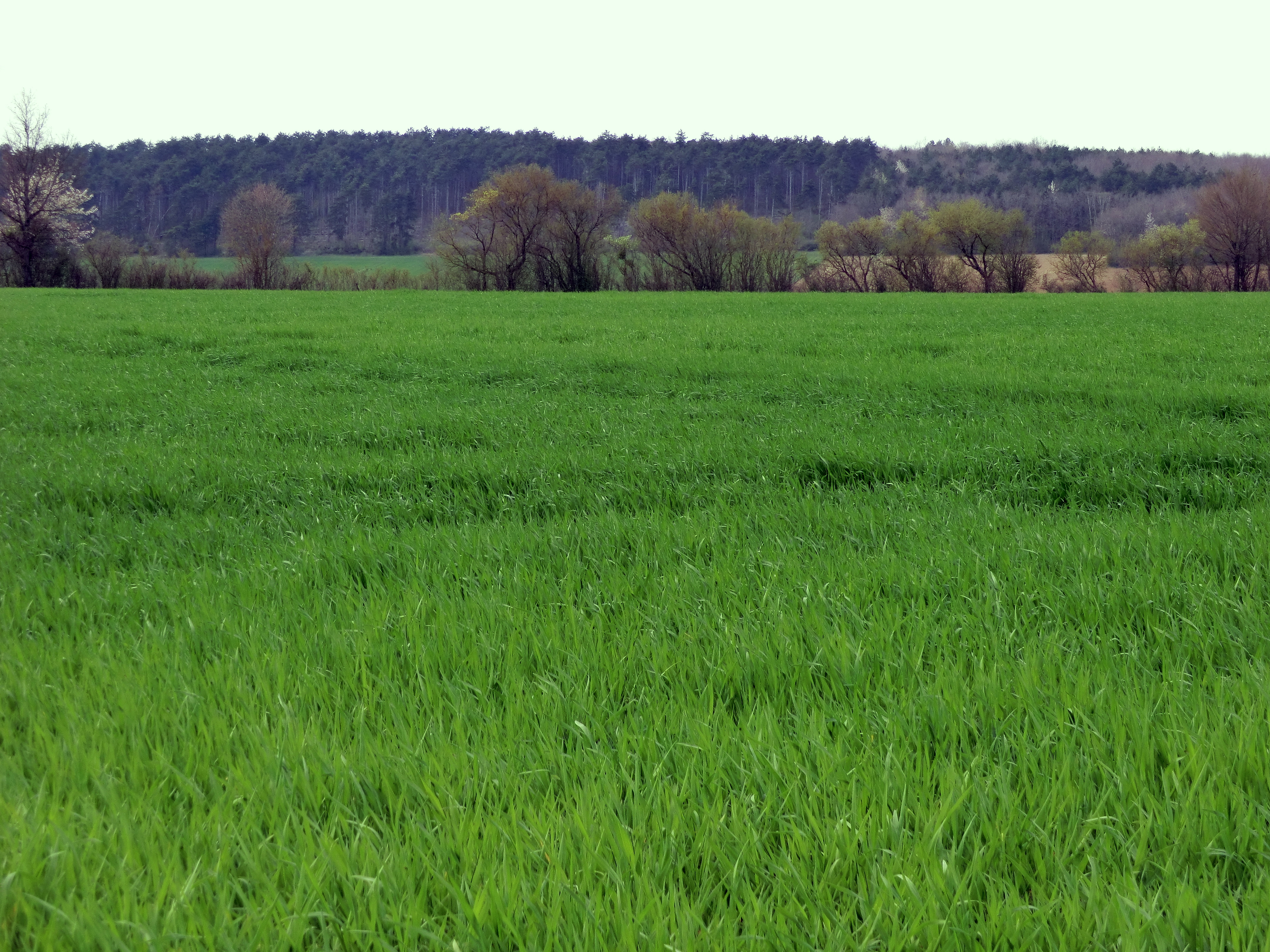
The wood of Roichat, named after Charles the Bald

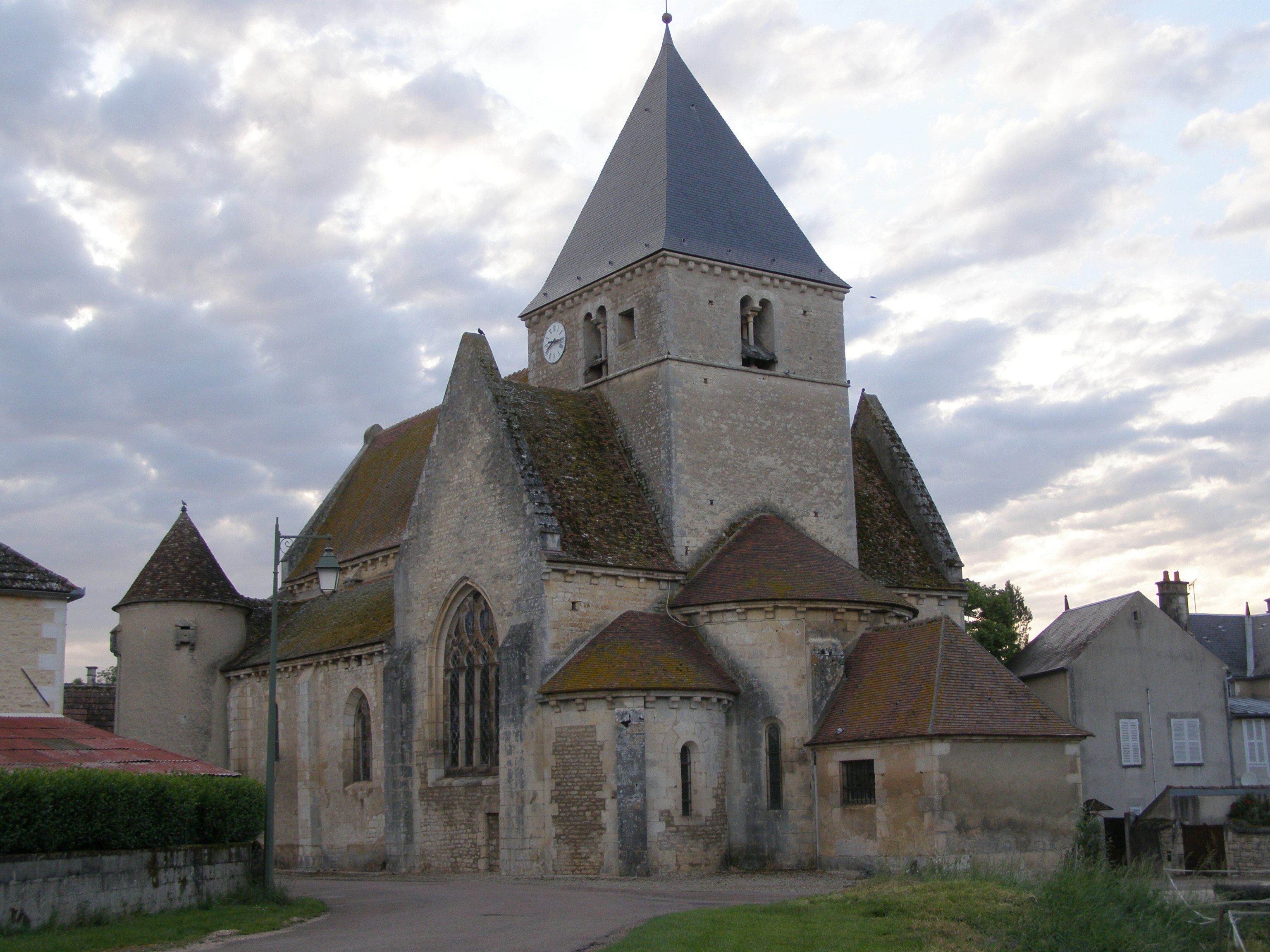
Romanesque church of Saint-Romain in Druyes

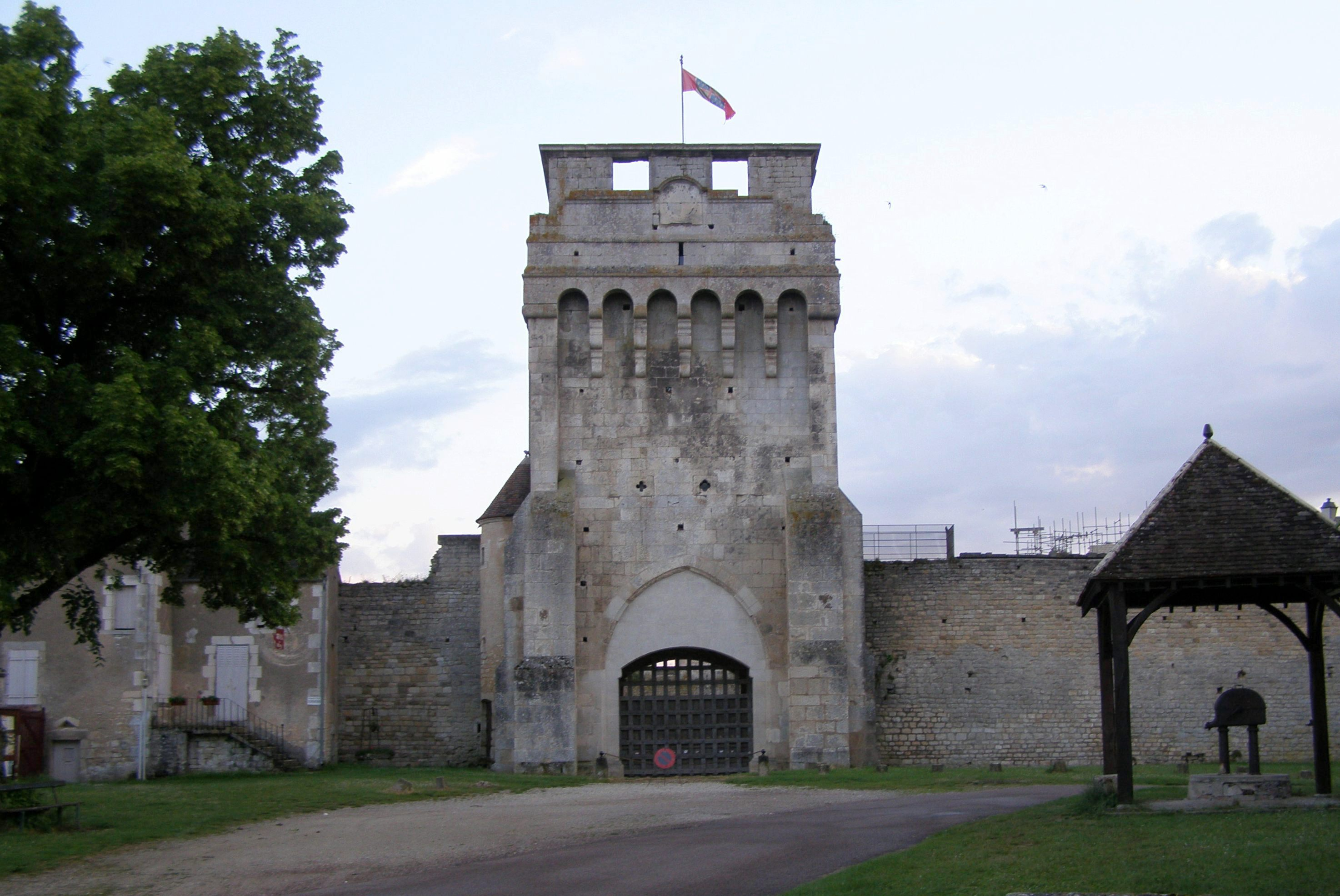
Château de Druyes

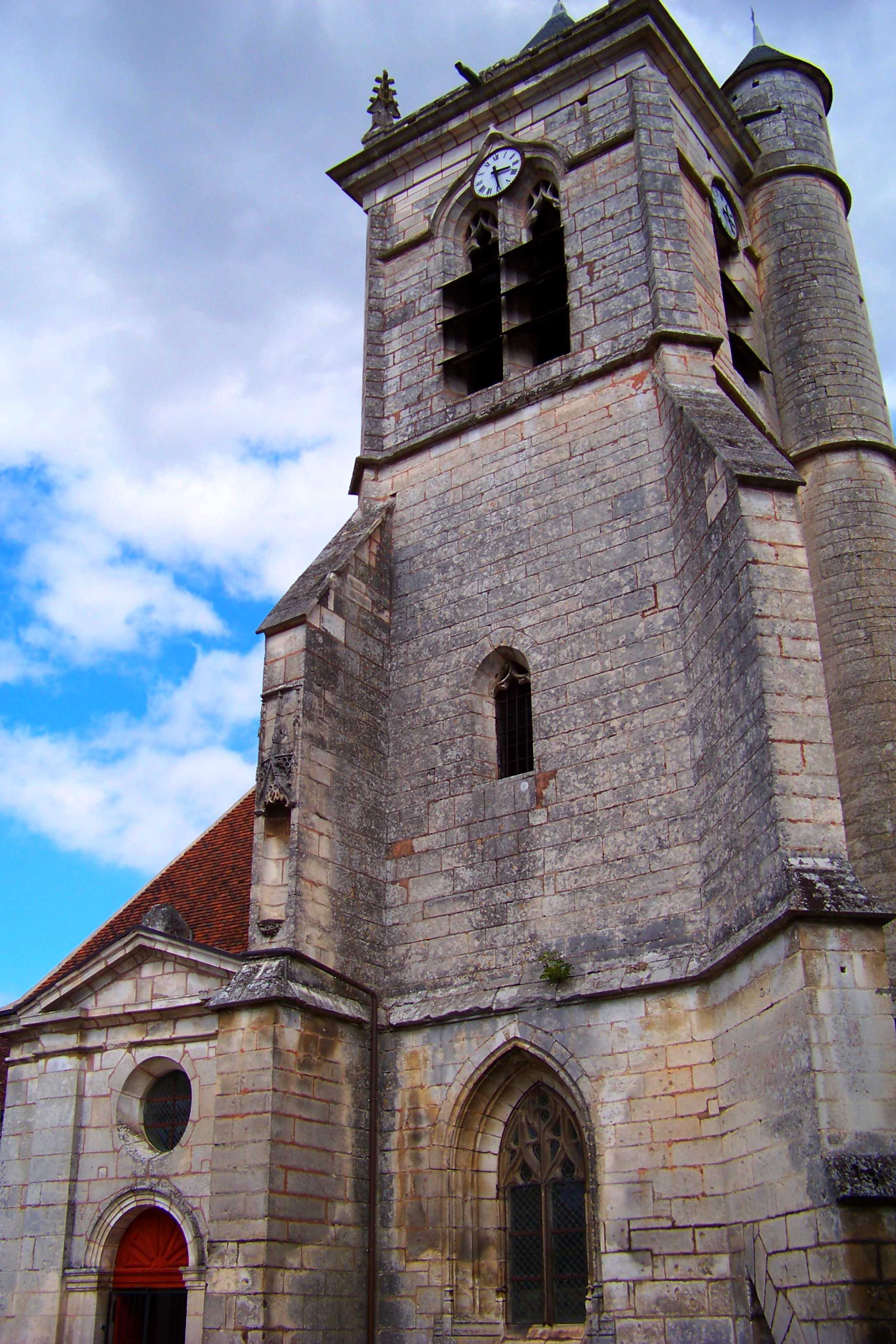
Saint-Laurent church in Charentenay

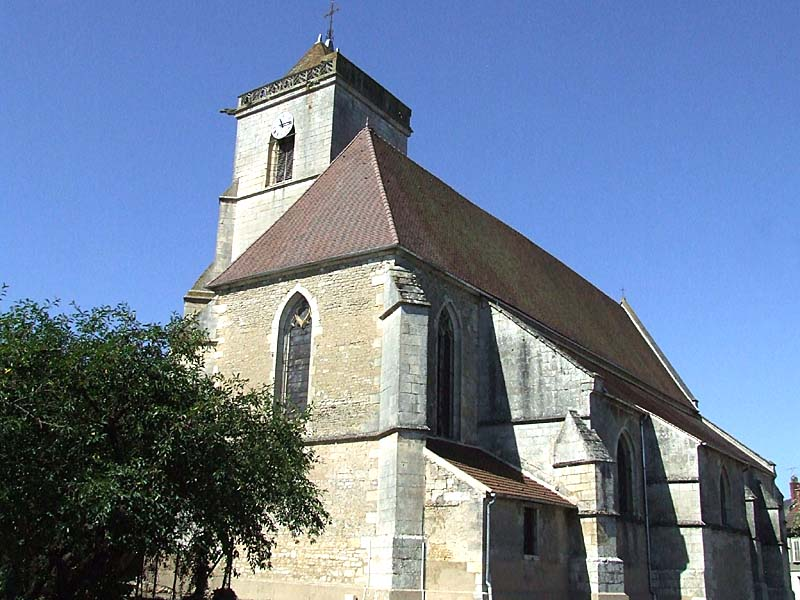
Saint-Pierre church in Etais-la-Sauvin

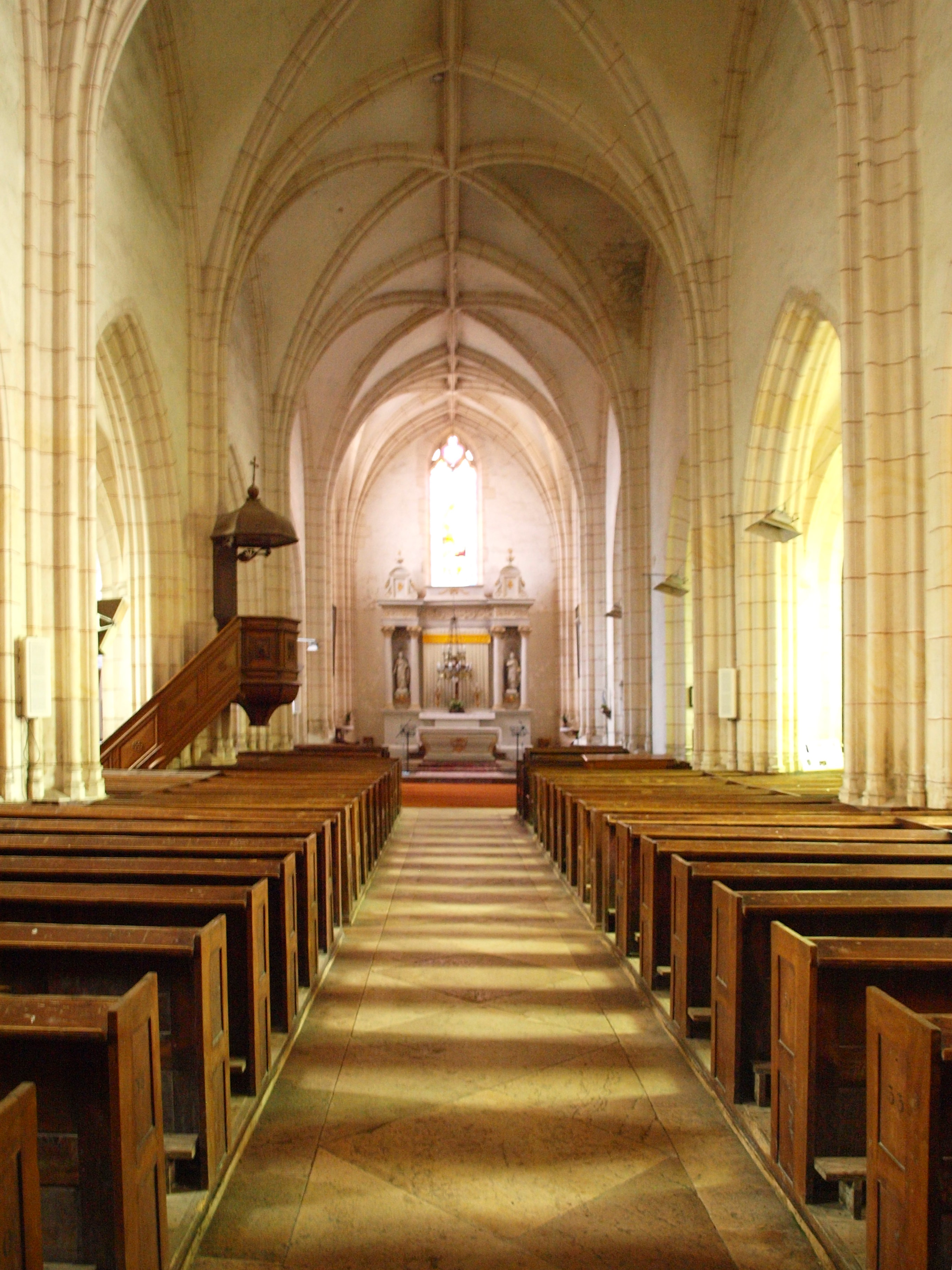
Interior of Saint-Pierre church in Etais-la-Sauvin

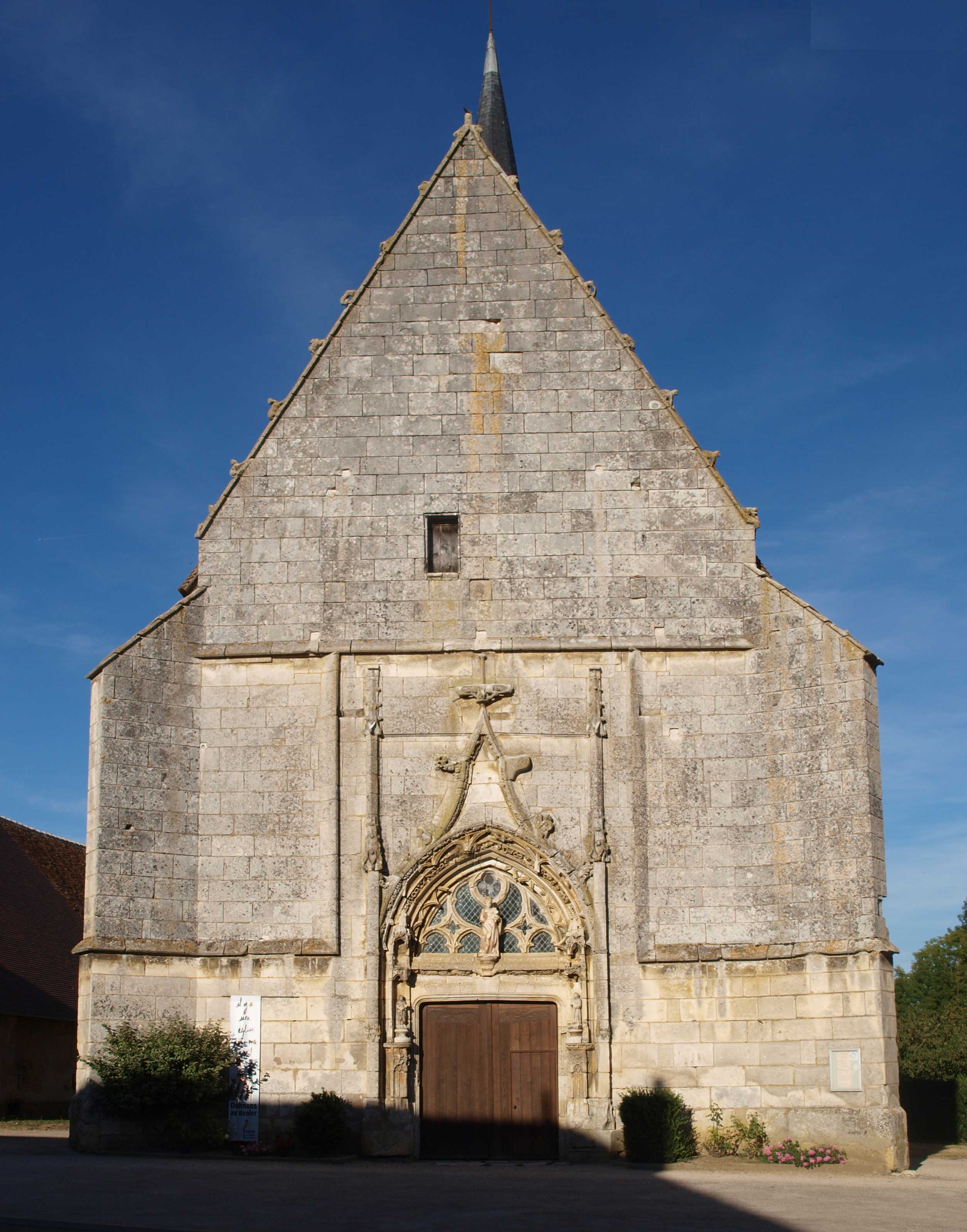
Saint-Marien church in Fontenoy

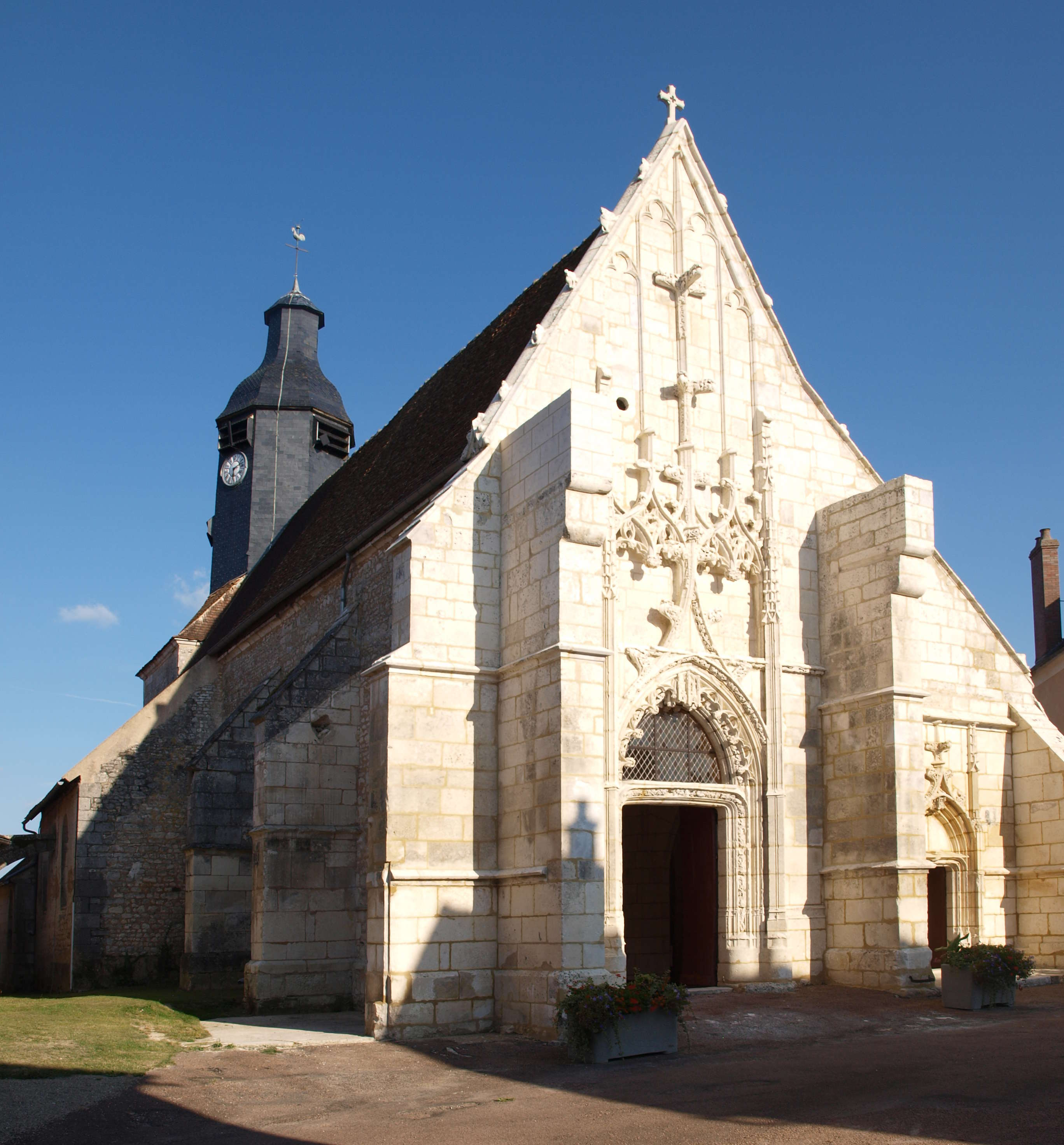
Saint-Martin church in Lainsecq

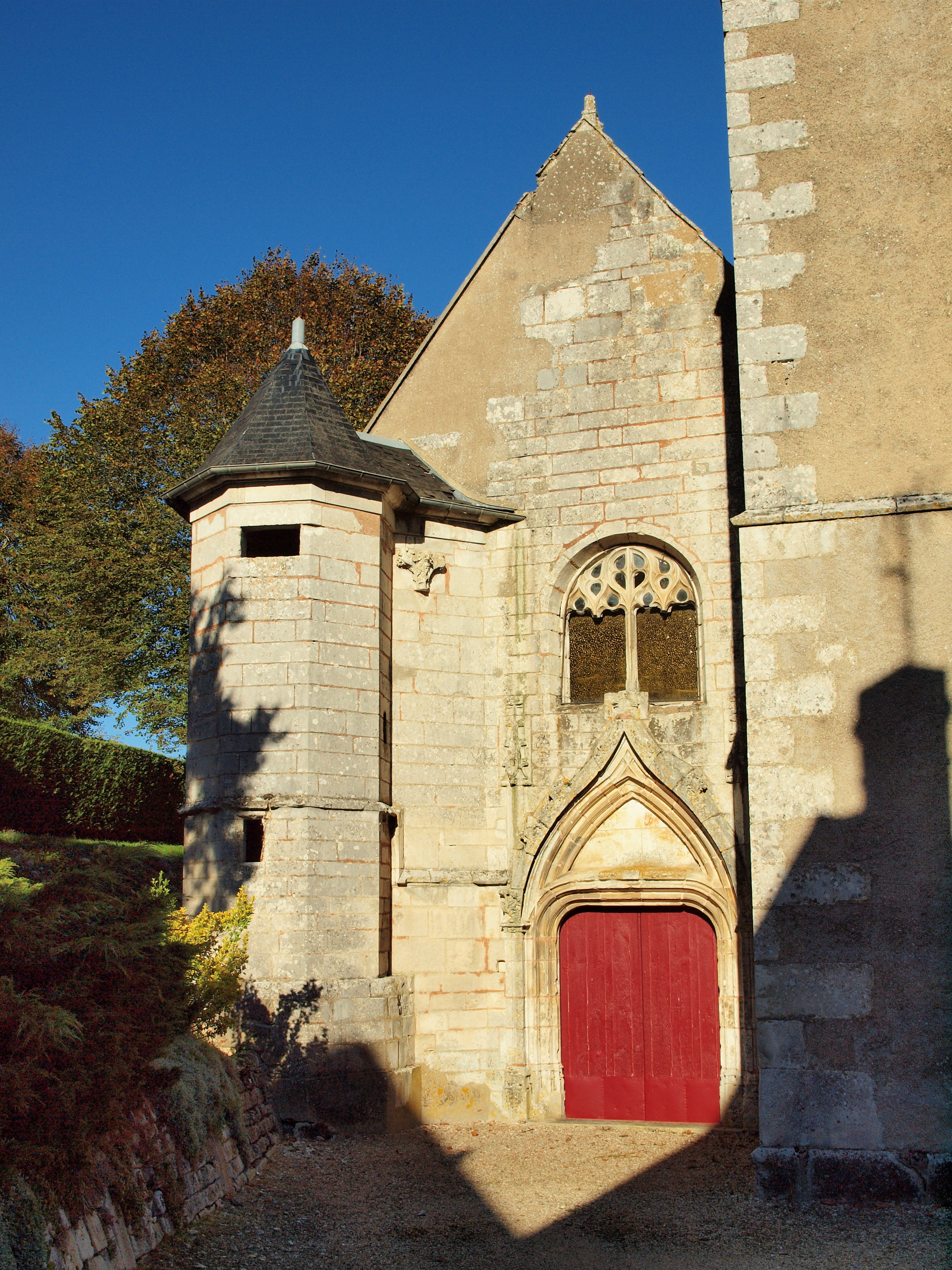
Saint-Menge church in Merry-Sec

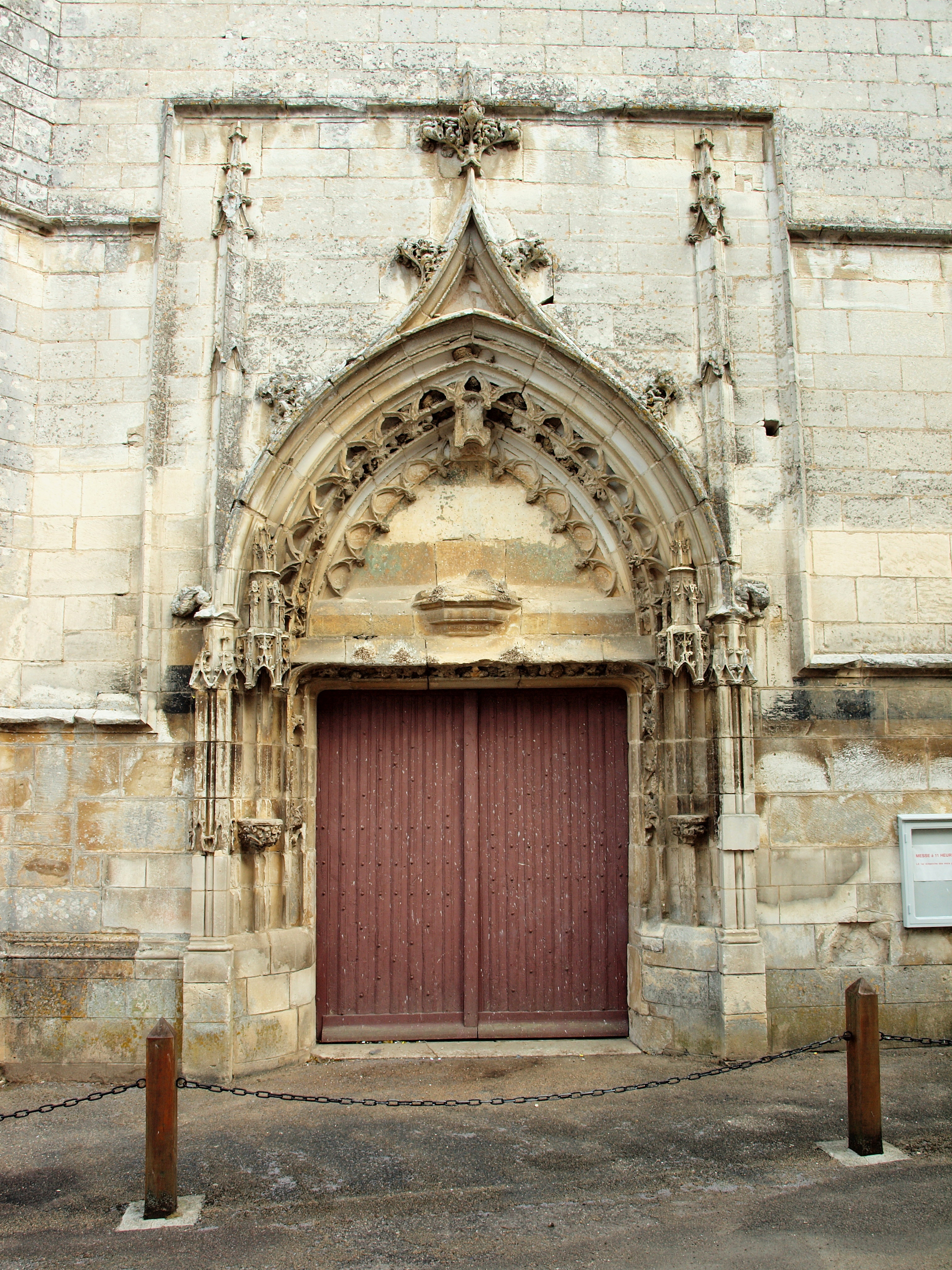
Portal of Saint-Romain church in Migé

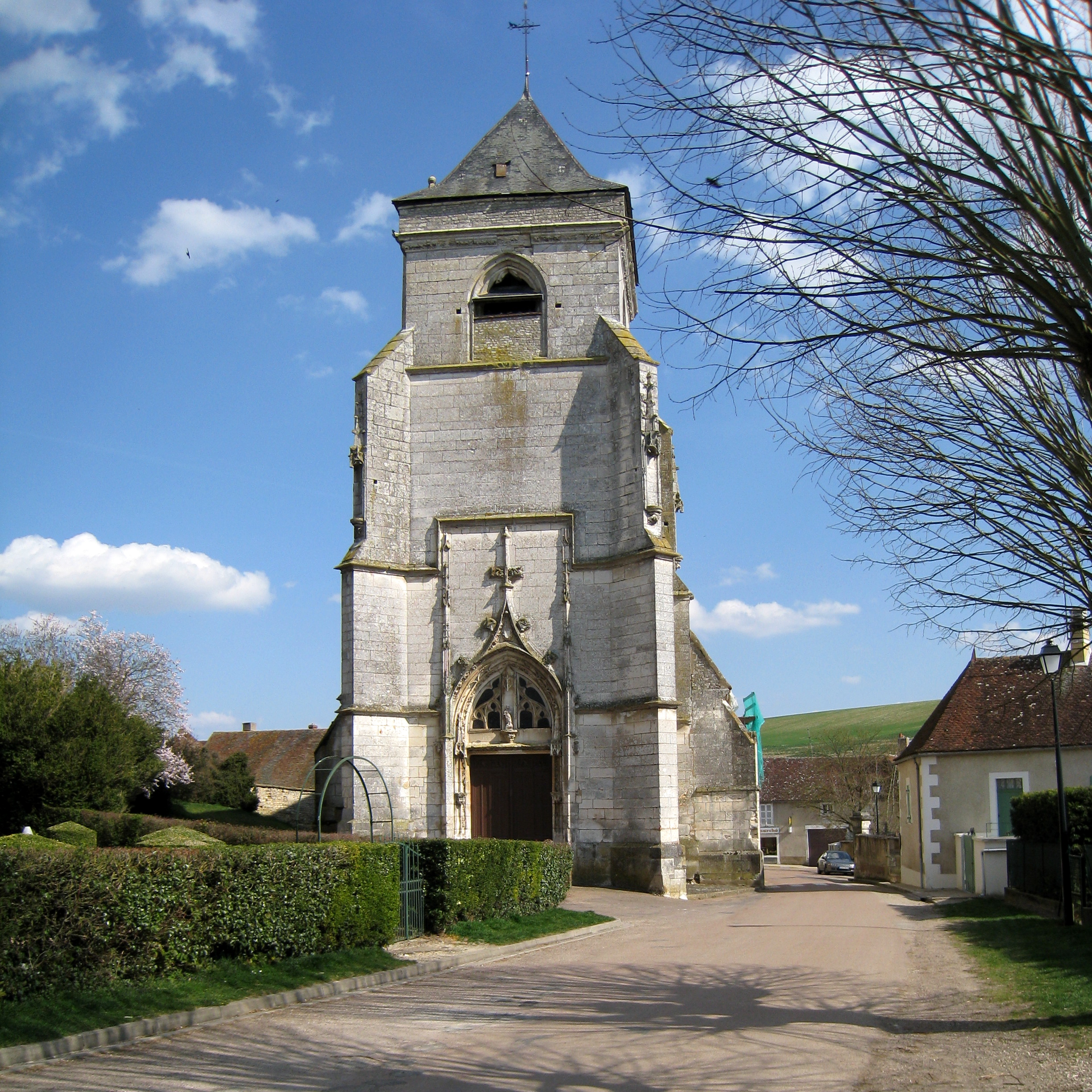
Notre-Dame church in Ouanne

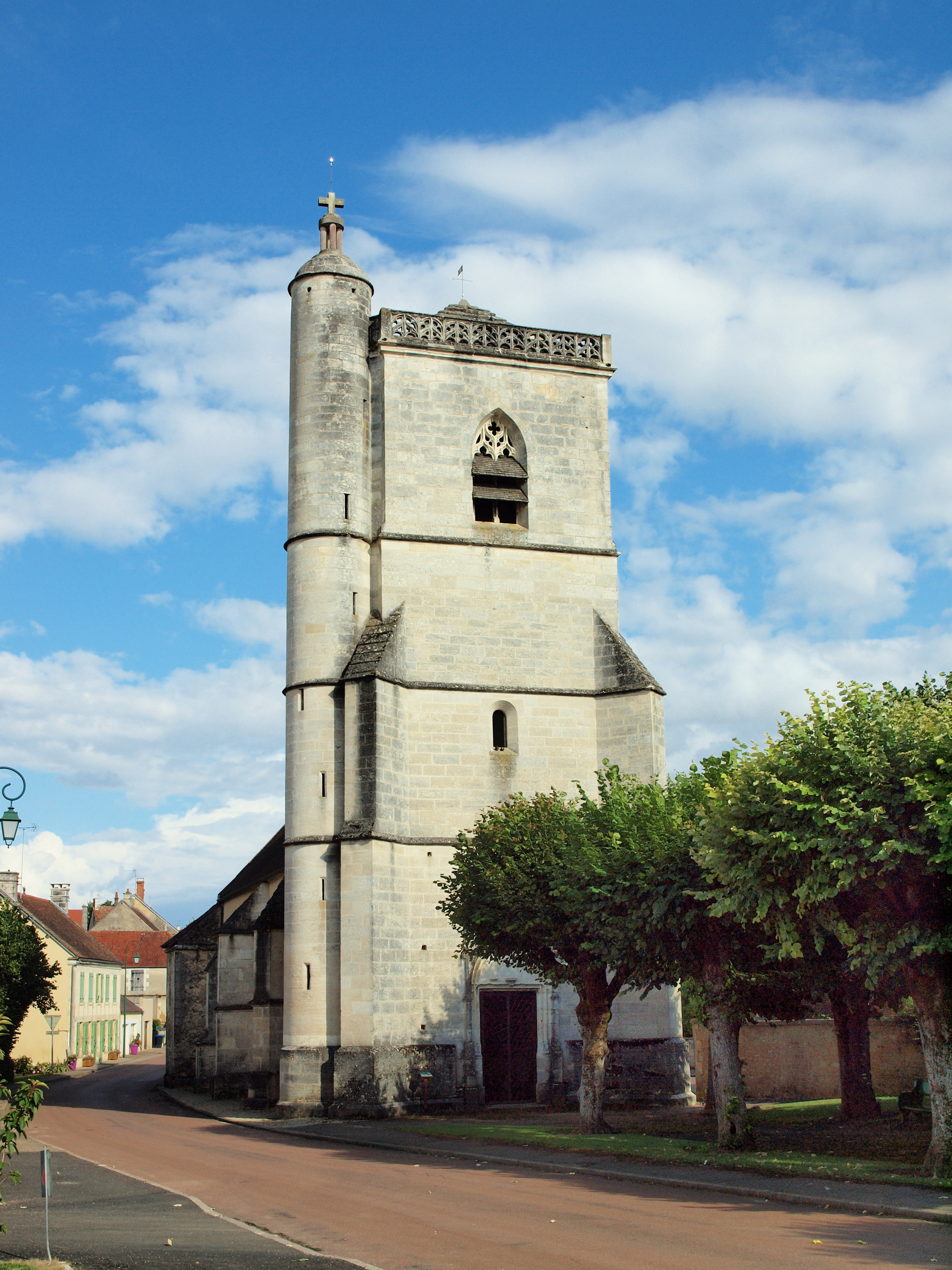
Church tower in Sainpuits

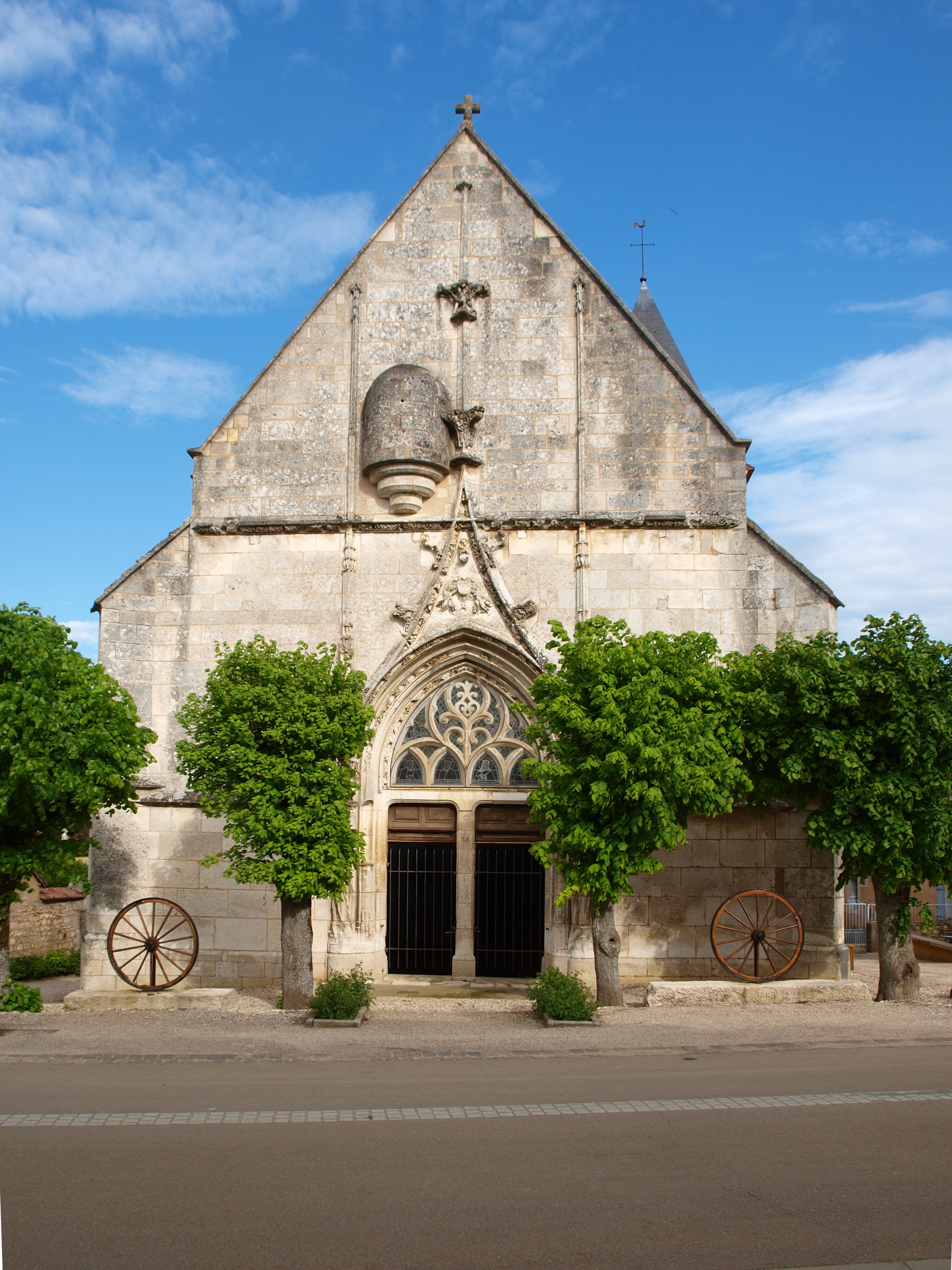
Sainte-Colombe church in Sainte-Colombe-sur-Loing

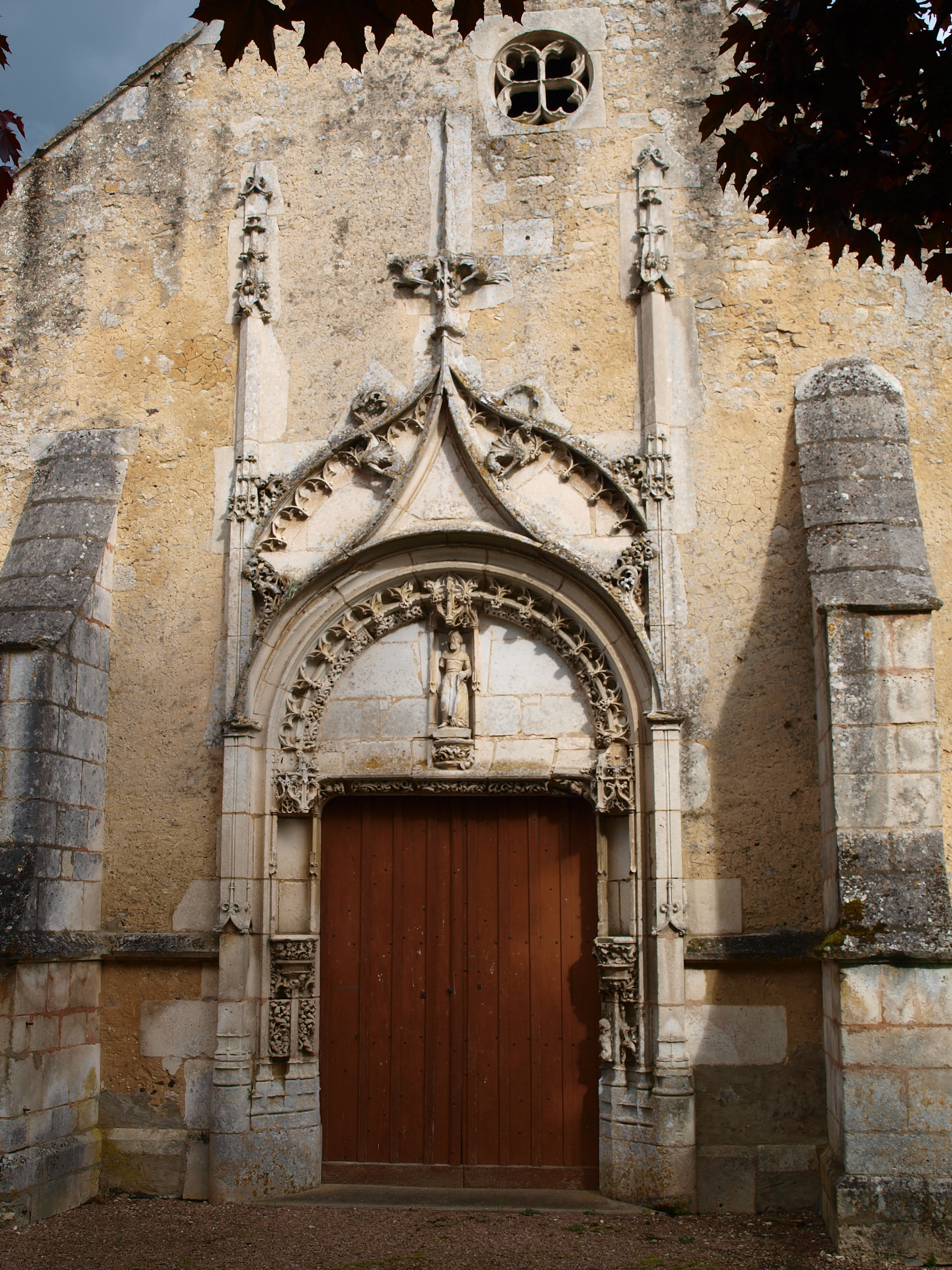
Portal of Sainte-Geneviève-et-Saint-Pierre church in Sementron

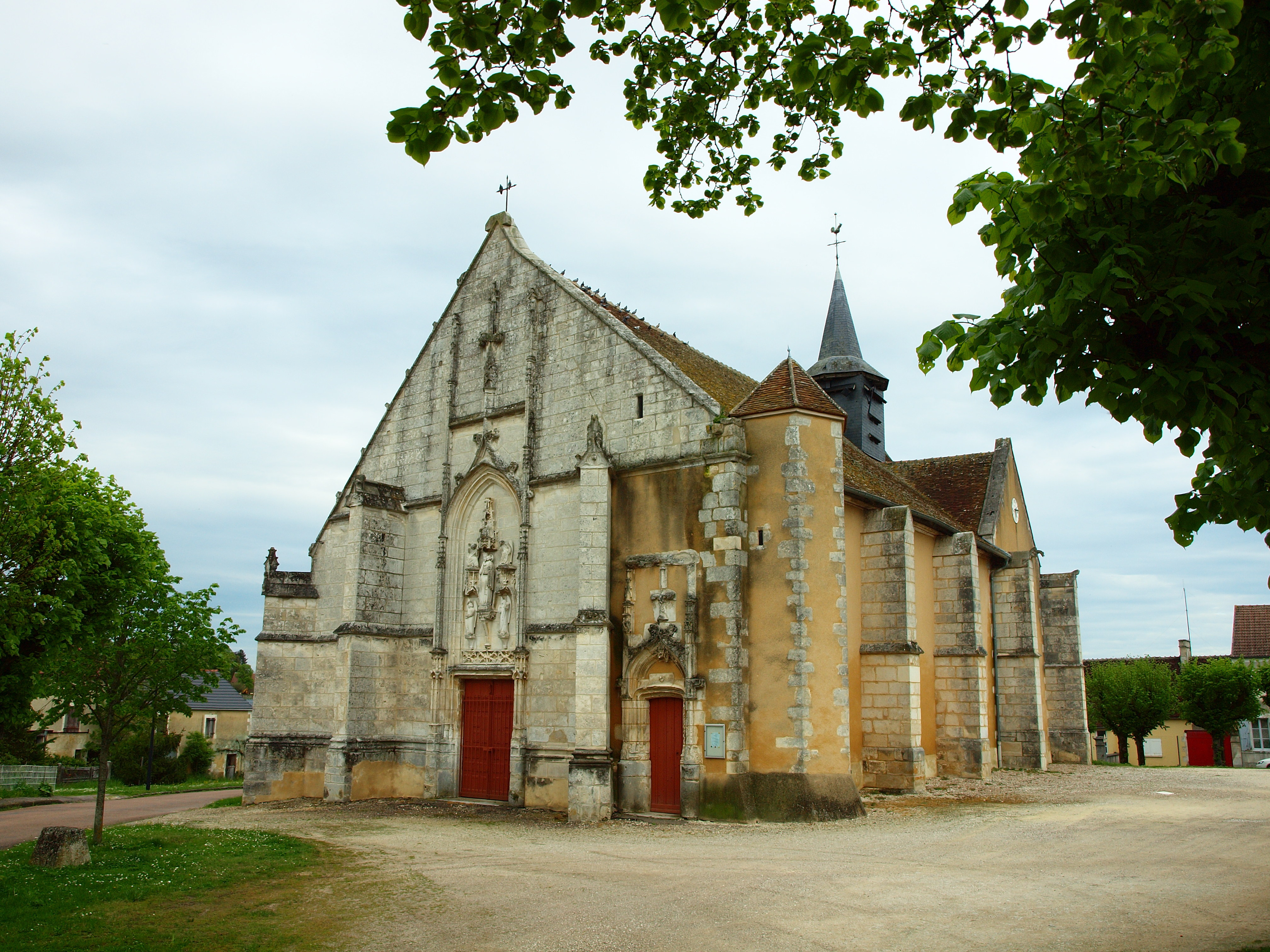
Saint-Pierre-et-Saint-Paul church in Sougères-en-Puisaye

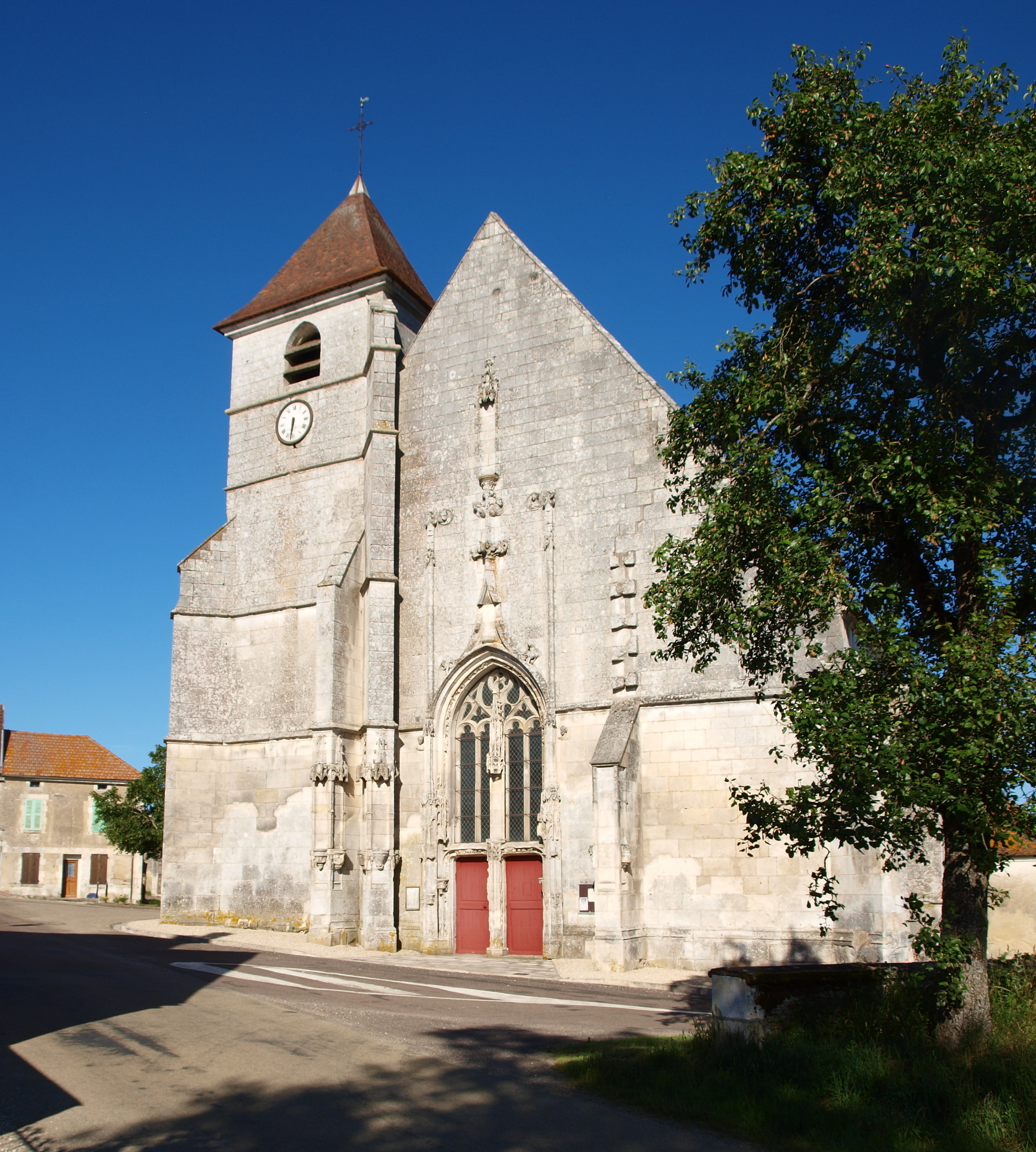
Saint-Martin church in Taingy

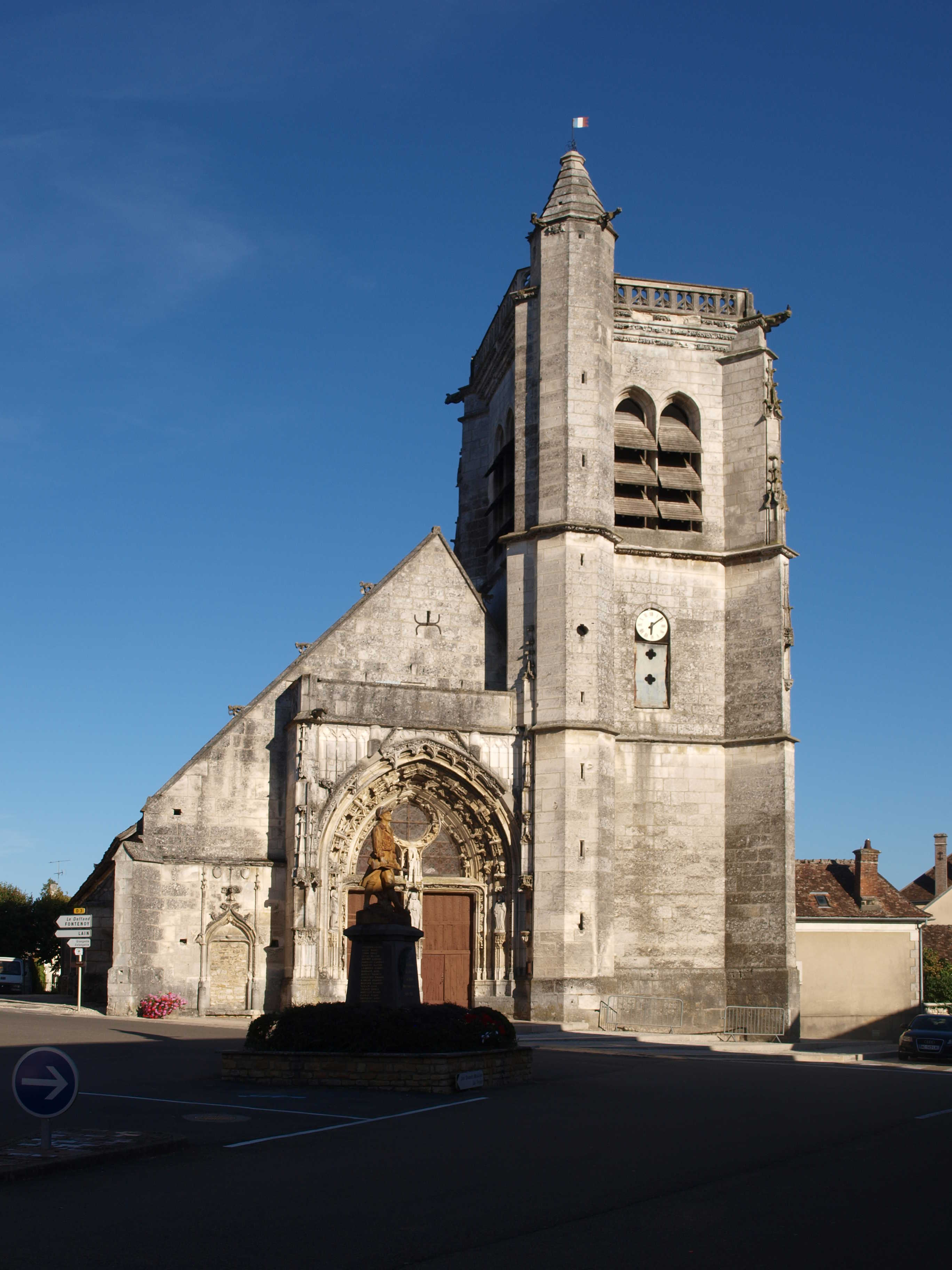
Saint-Julien church in Thury

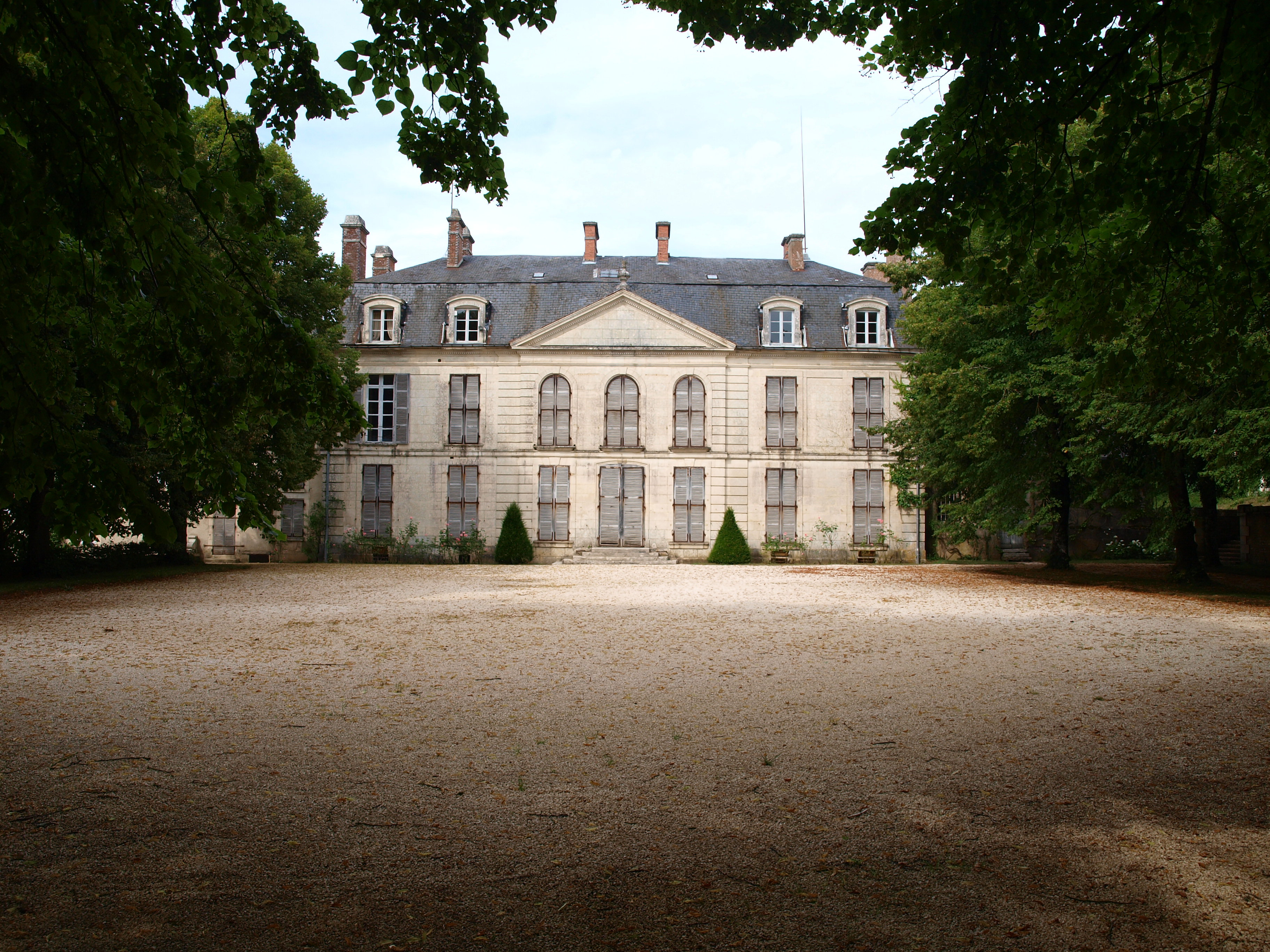
Château des Barres, 18th-19th centuries

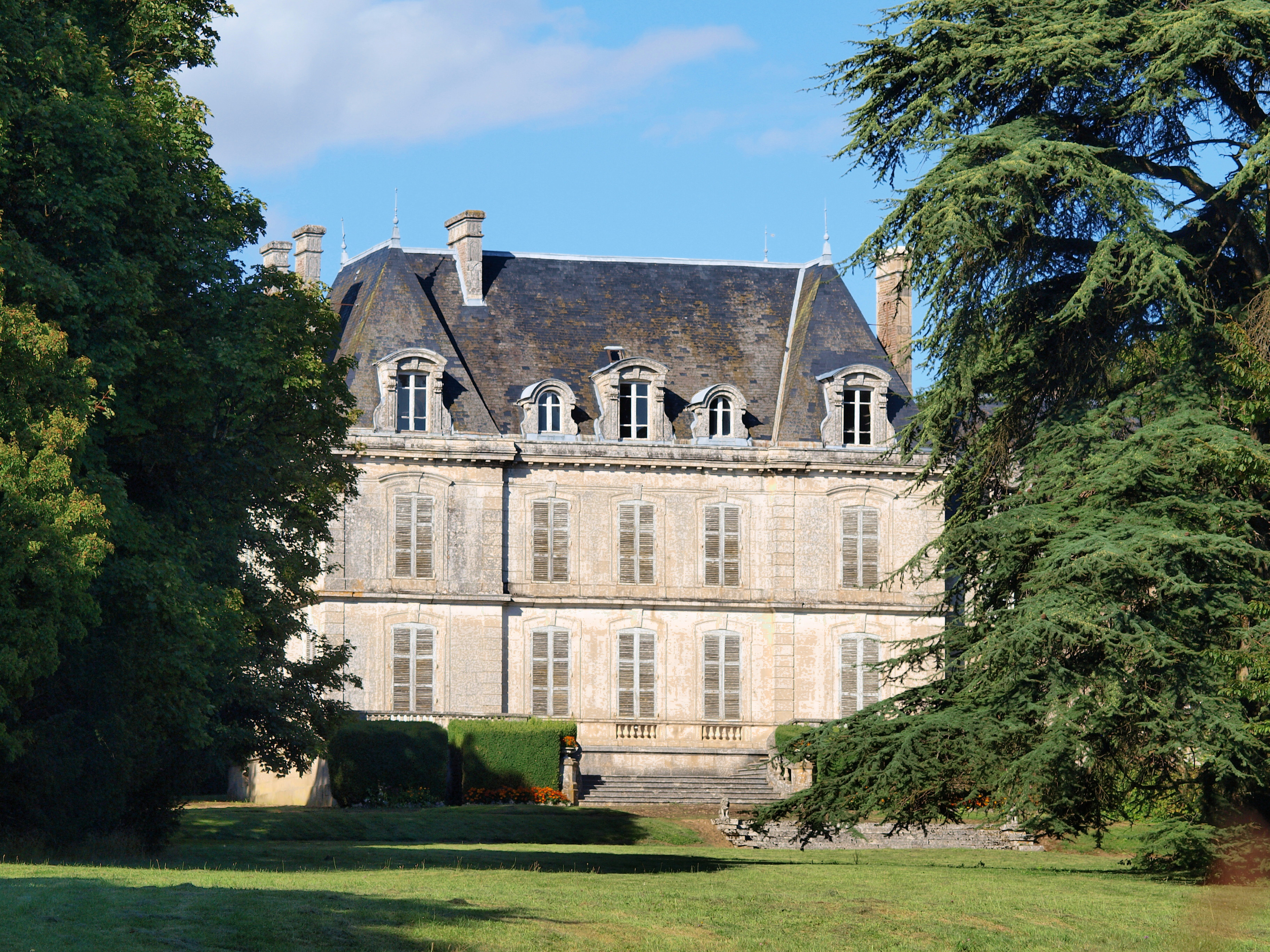
Château de Beauvais near Lainsecq, 19th century

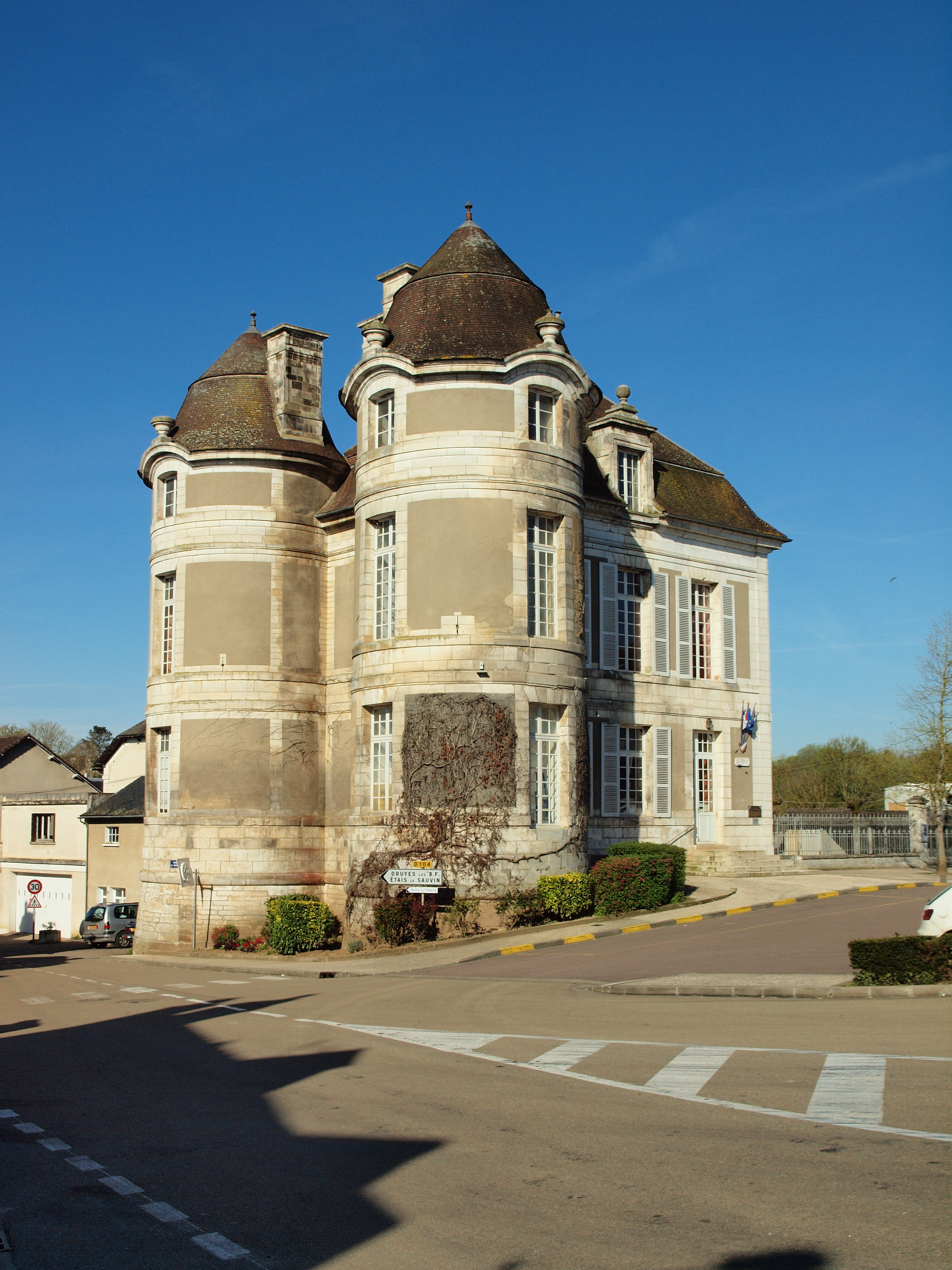
Town hall of Courson-les-Carrières

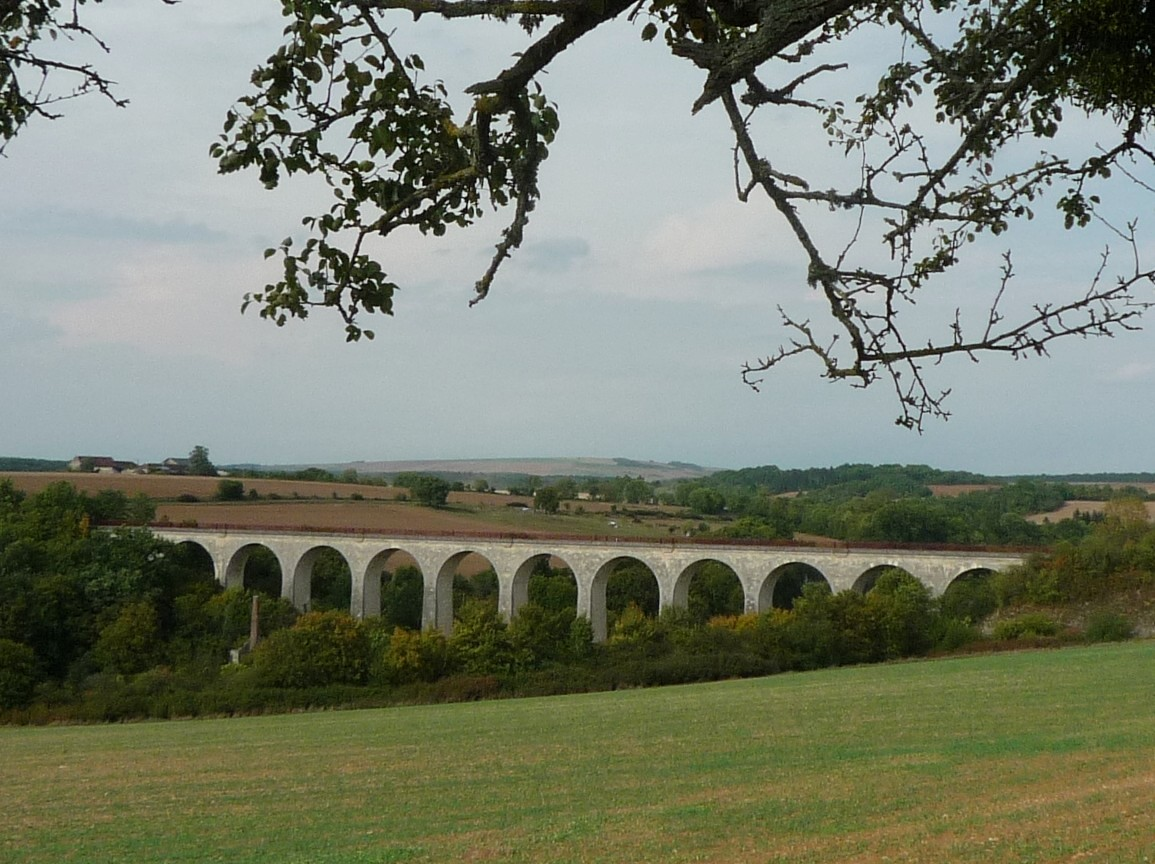
Railway viaduct of Druyes

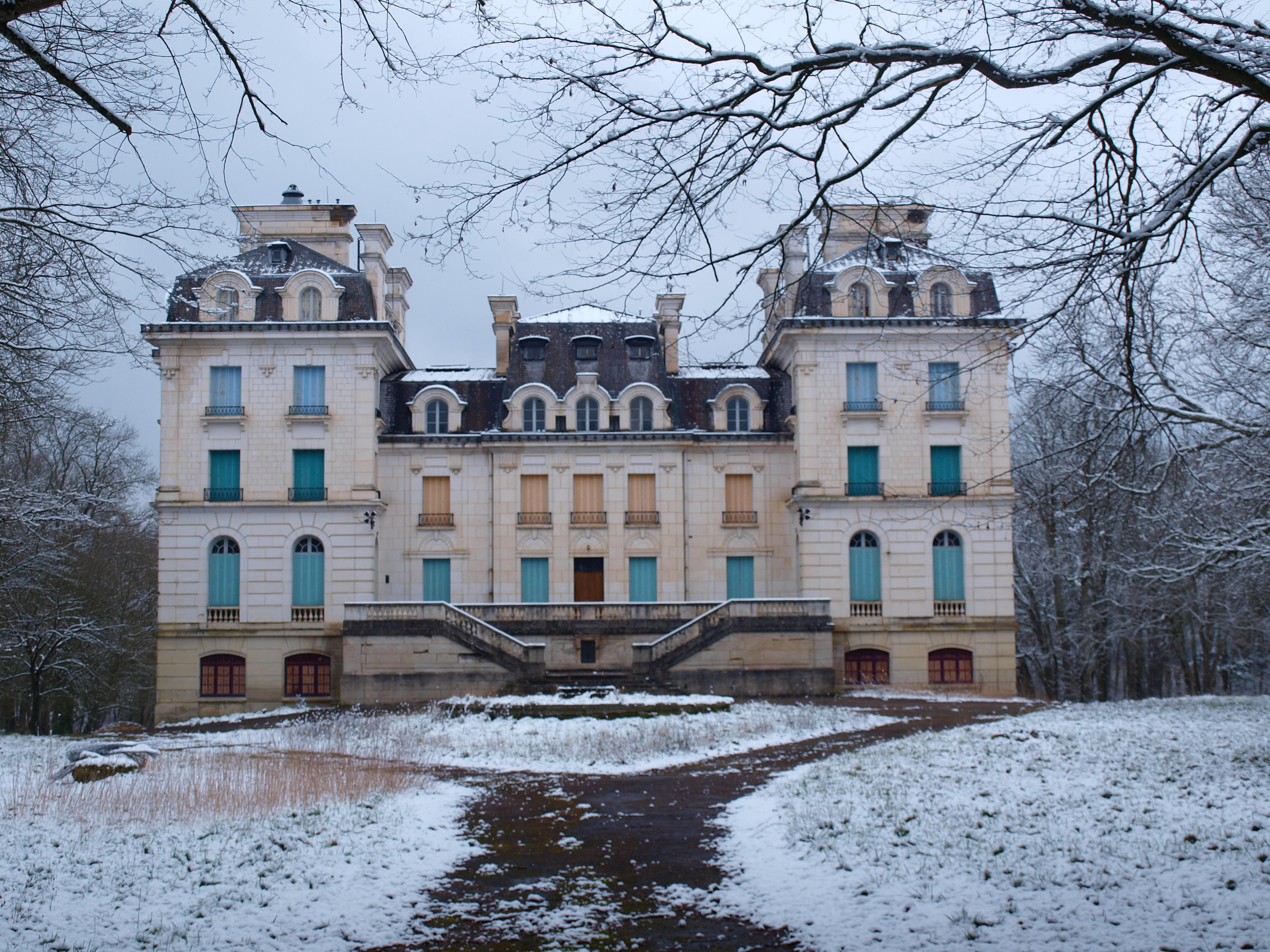
Château de Flacy near Sainpuits, 19th-20th centuries
