= Merry-Sec =

- Commune
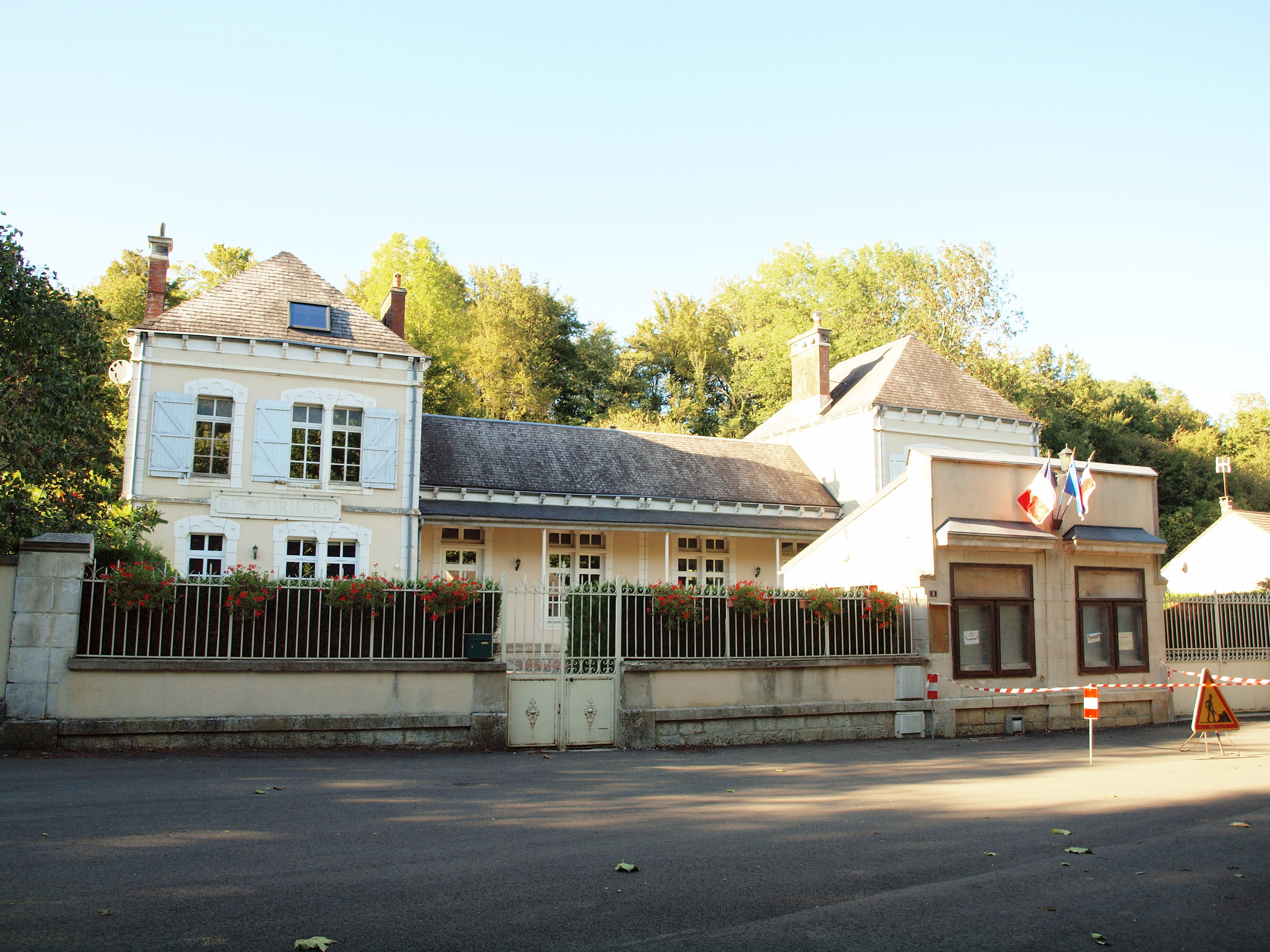
- The town hall in Merry-Sec
- Location of Merry-Sec
- Location within France Location within Bourgogne-Franche-Comté
- Coordinates: 47°39′26″N 3°29′09″E
- Country: France
- Region: Bourgogne-Franche-Comté
- Department: Yonne
- Arrondissement: Auxerre
- Canton: Vincelles

Government
  - Mayor (2020–2026): Monique Wlodarczyk
- Area^{1}: 14.17 km^{2} (5.47 sq mi)
- Highest elevation: 373 m (1,224 ft)
- Lowest elevation: 199 m (653 ft)
- Population (2023): 172
  - Density: 12.1/km^{2} (31.4/sq mi)
- Time zone: UTC+01:00 (CET)
  - Summer (DST): UTC+02:00 (CEST)
- INSEE/Postal code: 89252 /89560
- ^{1} French Land Register data, which excludes lakes, ponds, glaciers > 1 km^{2} (0.386 sq mi or 247 acres) and river estuaries.

Merry-Sec (French pronunciation: [meʁi sɛk]) is a commune in the Yonne department in Bourgogne-Franche-Comté in north-central France, in the natural region of Forterre.

== See also ==
- Communes of the Yonne department
