= Subi =

Subi may refer to:

- Subi language, a Bantu language of Tanzania
- Subi Reef, in the South China Sea
- Subi District, Natuna Regency, Indonesia
- Subiaco Oval, a sports ground and former stadium in Perth, Western Australia
- Subi Jacob George, Indian organic chemist
- Subi Suresh (1981–2023), Indian actress

== See also ==
- Subiaco (disambiguation)
- Suebi, a large group of Germanic tribes
