= Subiaco =

Subiaco may refer to:

- Subiaco, Arkansas, a town in the United States
  - Subiaco Abbey (Arkansas), a Benedictine monastery
  - Subiaco Academy, operated by the abbey
- Subiaco, Lazio, a town in Italy, site of St. Benedict's first monastery
  - Subiaco Press, a 15th-century printer based in Subiaco, Italy
    - Subiaco (typeface), an early 20th century typeface based on the types designed by the Subiaco Press
- Subiaco, Western Australia, suburb of Perth
  - Subiaco Oval, a sports ground and former stadium
  - Subiaco Football Club
  - City of Subiaco, a local government municipality in Perth, Western Australia centred on the suburb of the same name

== See also ==
- Subiaco Creek, a watercourse in Sydney, Australia
