= Abbey of Saint Scholastica, Subiaco =

Benedictine abbey in Italy

Coordinates: 41°55′00″N 13°07′07″E

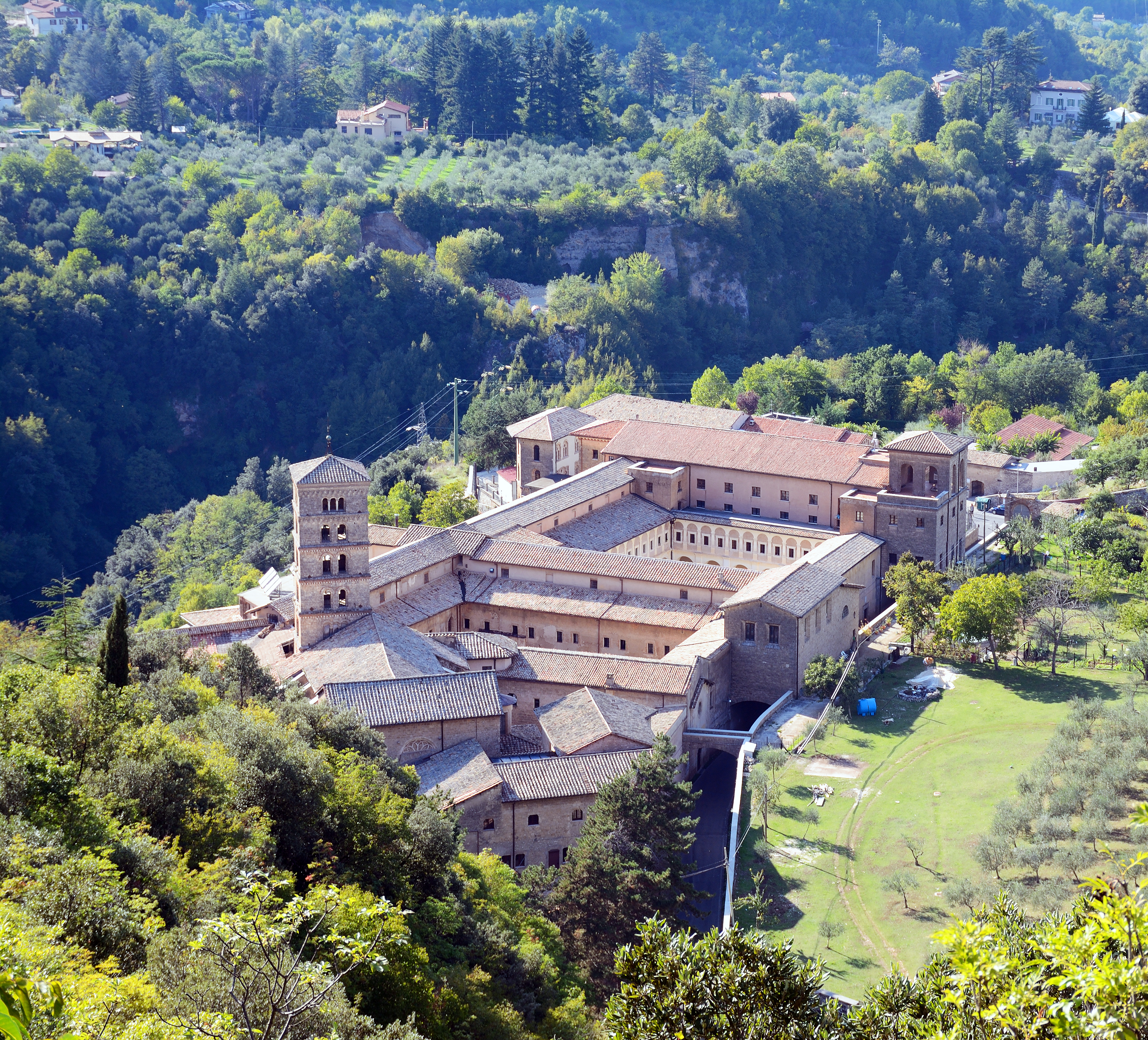
Aerial view of St. Scholastica's Abbey

The Abbey of Saint Scholastica, also known as Subiaco Abbey (Italian: Abbazia di Santa Scolastica), is located just outside the town of Subiaco in the Province of Rome, Region of Lazio, Italy; and is still an active Benedictine abbey, territorial abbey, first founded in the 6th century AD by Saint Benedict of Nursia. It was in one of the Subiaco caves (or grotto) that Benedict made his first hermitage. The monastery today gives its name to the Subiaco Congregation, a grouping of monasteries worldwide that makes up part of the Order of Saint Benedict.

St. Scholastica's Abbey today is part of the Subiaco Congregation, a grouping of 64 male Benedictine monasteries on five continents, to which 45 female monasteries also belong, within the larger Benedictine Confederation.

== History ==
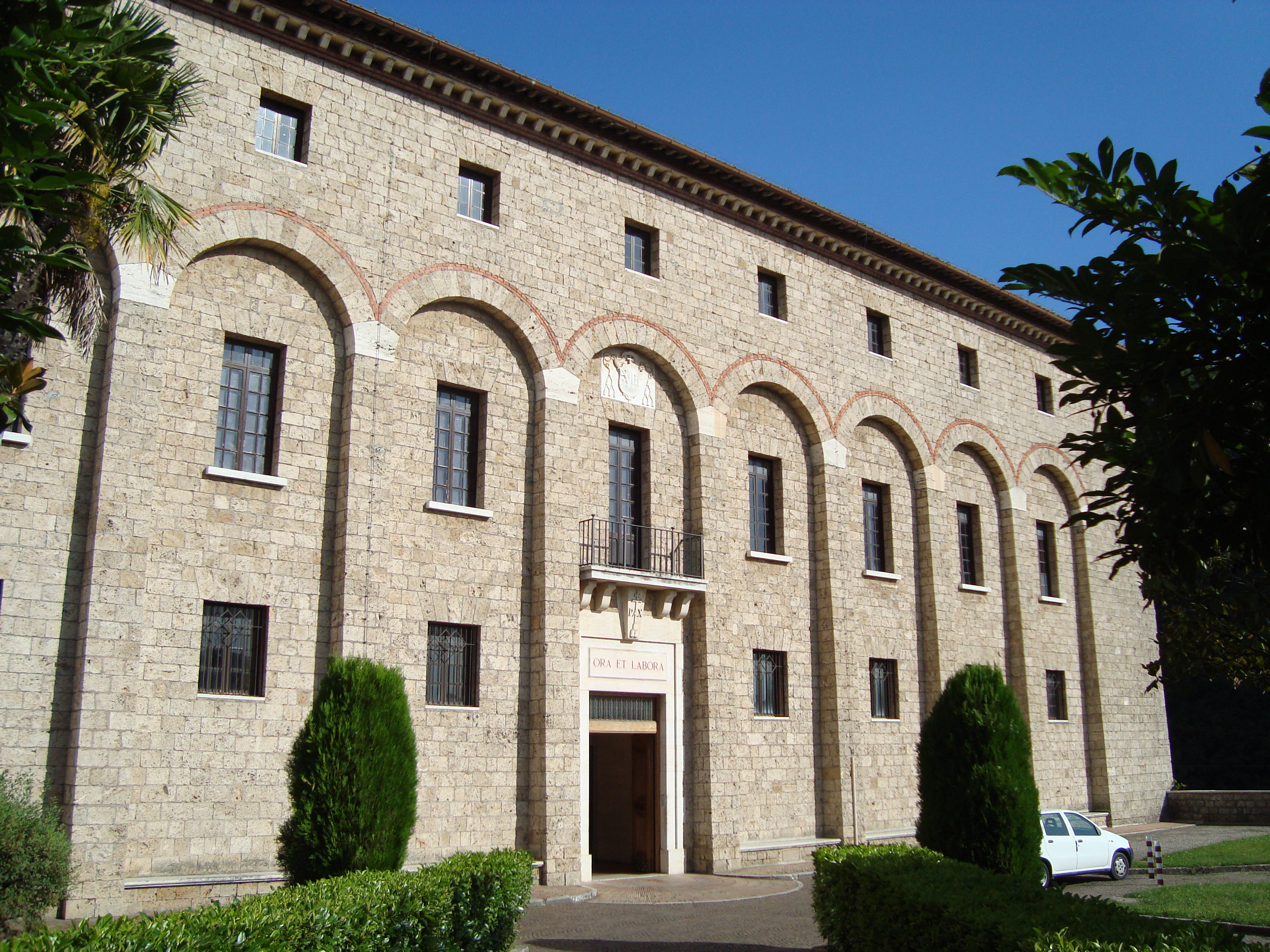
The monastery entrance.

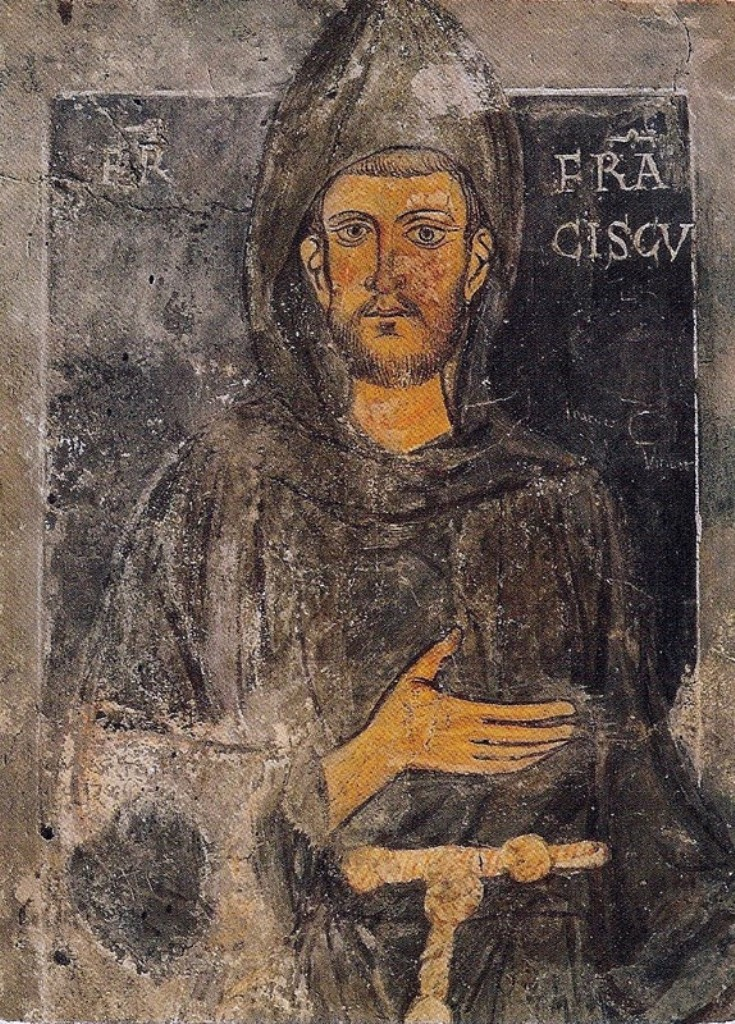
Oldest known portrait in existence of St. Francis of Assisi, dating back to his retreat to Subiaco (1223–1224): he is depicted without the stigmata.

In the early 6th century Benedict of Nursia, a man from a well-to-do family who was educated at Rome, retired to a grotto near an ancient Roman Villa in Subiaco, in the mountains of north Latium (Lazio). His reputation as a spiritual guide quickly drew disciples to him there, including many of his old Roman friends, who also settled in the area. Over the years, no fewer than thirteen monastic communities arose around Subiaco, including the one that would come to be named for St. Scholastica, Benedict's sister and herself a monastic. Eventually, seeking greater solitude, Benedict would retire to Monte Cassino, where the same process would be repeated.

In the 9th century, St. Scholastica's Abbey was twice destroyed by the Saracens, in 828-829 and 876–877. But it was restored, and grew in the tenth century thanks to the patronage and favour of several popes, many of whom were, in fact, Benedictine monks.

As for monastic establishments throughout Europe, the 11th and 12th centuries were a golden age for the abbey, when it boasted vast lands, a large number of monks, and elaborate, ornate liturgy. With economic power came political power as well. In the thirteenth century, a sanctuary was erected over the cave where St. Benedict had dwelt, the Sacro Speco or "Holy Cave".

Riches also brought covetousness, and the abbey's prestige brought it enemies. Long power struggles with the feudal establishment weakened the abbey, and decadence set in when Calixtus III made Juan de Torquemada (uncle of the famous inquisitor) commendatory abbot. Subsequently, powerful families tied to the papacy controlled it. Rodrigo Borgia (later the infamous Alexander VI) held the commendatory abbacy in 1467. The Colonna (1492), Borghese (1608), and Barberini (1633) families would also gain control of its revenues. Some took their ownership of the abbey seriously and tried to restore it, but most were content to exploit its revenues, sometimes without even ever visiting the monastery. The spiritual well-being of the monks was rarely a concern.

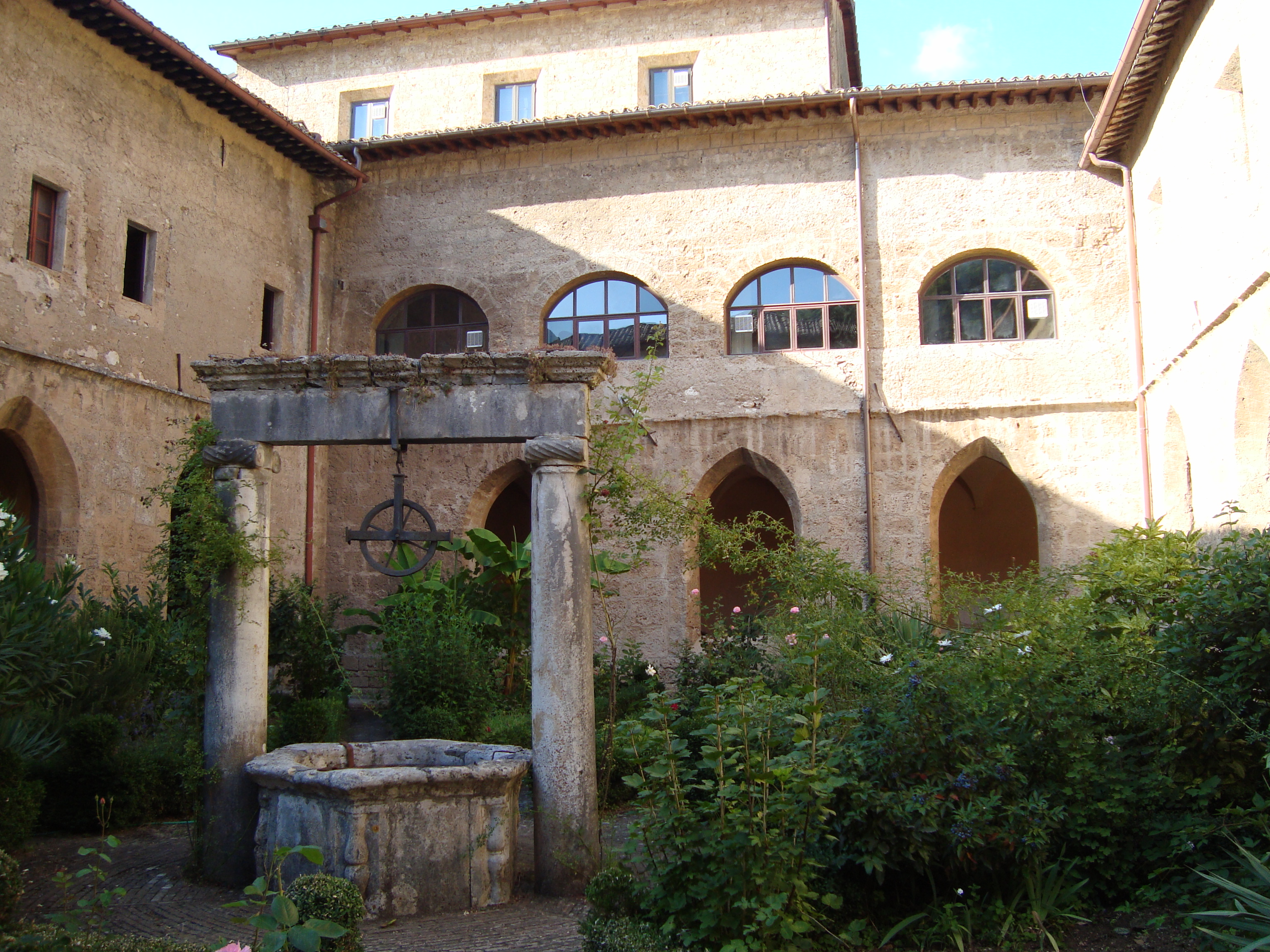
12th Century cloisters.

The tide began to turn in 1753, when Benedict XIV decided to remove commendatory abbots' power over the day-to-day running of their monasteries, leaving them only the spiritual and ecclesiastical dignity. Yet at the end of the century, when the French occupied the Papal States, the abbey was suppressed. Pius VII restored it as soon as he regained his independence. In 1915, Benedict XV accorded it the privilege of a territorial abbey.

== Description ==
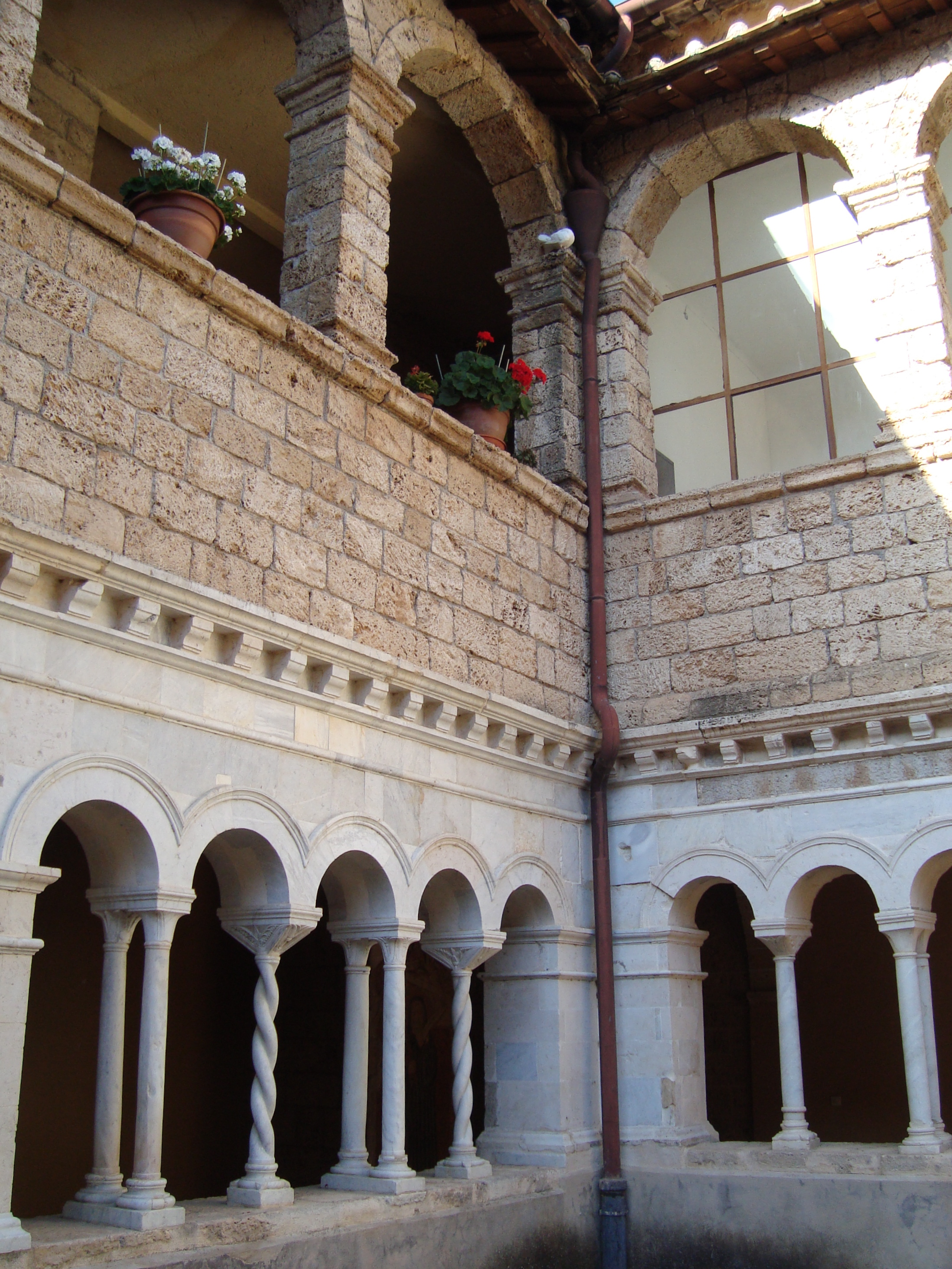
14th Century cloisters.

The monastic community today is made up of nineteen monks living at two sites: most are resident at St. Scholastica's Abbey proper, while a small contingent resides at the Sacro Speco (Holy Cave), the shrine at St. Benedict's hermitage.

=== St. Scholastica's Abbey ===
The buildings are arranged around three cloisters. The oldest (12–13th centuries) is in the cosmatesque style; the second is in the Gothic style, dating to the 14th-15th centuries. The third is from the late 16th century, in Renaissance style; it was finished in 1689.

The abbey church is a Gothic building with a Romanesque-style campanile, entirely rebuilt in 1771–1776 by Giacomo Quarenghi with a neo-classical style that stands apart from the rest of the abbey's architecture.

=== St. Benedict's Cave (Sacro Speco) ===
Located a few kilometers from the abbey proper, the ancient shrine is attached to the side of the mountain, its structure supported by nine high arcades. It can be visited in part by pilgrims and other visitors.

The interior is an extensive complex of small cells, and chapels—including one over St. Benedict's own hermitage, others hewn from the living rock. There are extensive frescoes dating to various periods. The lower church contains works by Roman painters of the mid-13th century, while the upper church has works from the Sienese school (early 14th century) and others from the Umbrian-Marche school (15th century). There is also a large statue of St. Benedict by Antonio Raggi (1657).

Among the frescoes is a representation of Saint Francis of Assisi, the oldest known portrait of the saint in existence, executed in his lifetime, during the period he spent in retreat at Subiaco (1223–1224). It is noteworthy that Francis is depicted without the stigmata and without a halo.

== Territorial status ==
The canonical status of "abbey nullius", or in modern terminology "territorial abbey", granted to Subiaco by Pope Benedict XV was modified by the Holy See in 2002, in harmony with a recent general policy, applied also in the case of other Benedictine houses, such as the Abbey of Monte Cassino and that of Montevergine. Since 1915, the Abbey of Subiaco had had jurisdiction, in a manner similar to any Catholic diocese, over 29 parishes in the vicinity. The 2002 measures transferred these parishes to a variety of neighbouring dioceses, leaving the abbot, as ordinary, with jurisdiction over the abbey church itself, the Sacro Speco and other Benedictine properties close by. The cathedral church of the Subiaco quasi-diocese remains the abbey church, which is at the same time the parish church solely of the parish where it stands.
