= Gioacchino Pagliei =

Italian painter

Gioacchino Pagliei (1852–1896) was an Italian painter born in Subiaco, Lazio, who worked in the Neo-Pompeian genre.

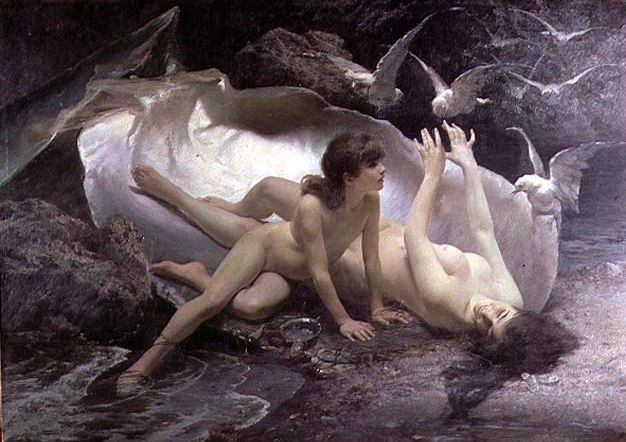
The Naiads, 1881

== Education and career ==
Pagliei studied in Rome at the Accademia di San Luca, where in 1871 he won an award for a drawing and essay. In 1875, he won the Stanziani competition.

A follower of F. Grandi, he worked on the decoration of the church of San Lorenzo in Damaso. He also worked at the Palazzo del Quirinale and the Villino Gamberini.

His oil painting style followed the Neo-Pompeian genre.

He was introduced to the Società degli Amatori e Cultori delle Belle Arti in the 1880s where he exhibited A Costume of the Empire, 1882; The Embarrassment, 1884; and Nella scala, 1895–1896.

Pagliei died in Rome in 1896.

== Works ==
Pagliei's works include:

- The Naiads, 1881
- Gallant Dragoon
- The Finishing Touches
- La danza
- At the Ball
- Young Girls Dancing by a Fountain
- A Costume of the Empire, 1882
- The Embarrassment, 1884
- Nella scala, 1895–1896.
