= Benedetto Portinari Triptych =

Oil painting by Hans Memling

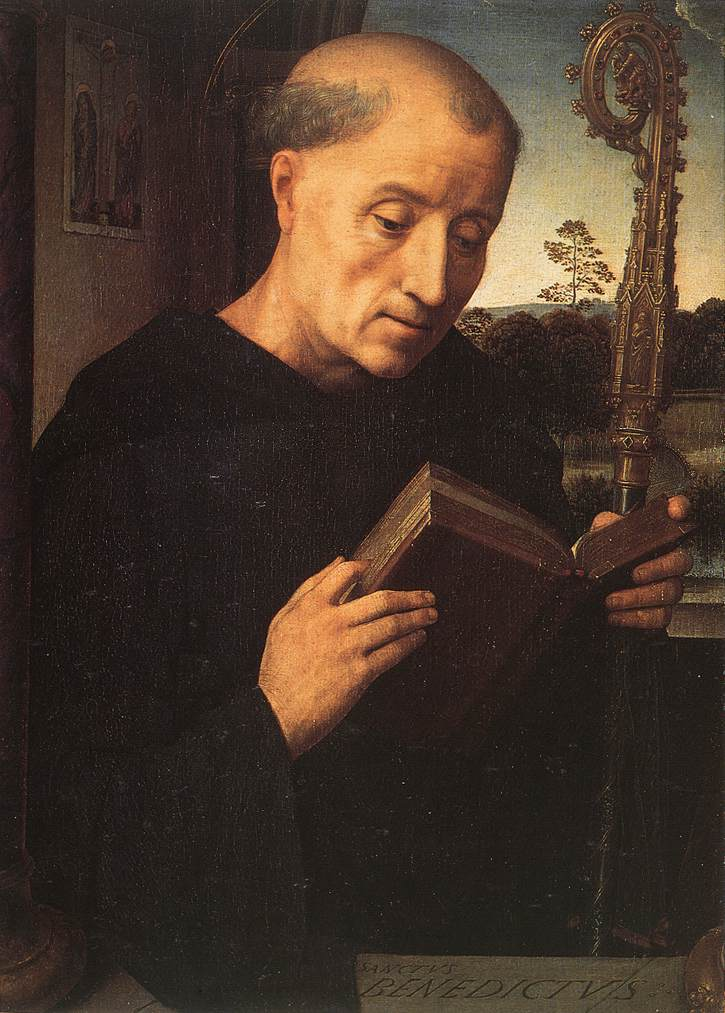
Saint Benedict

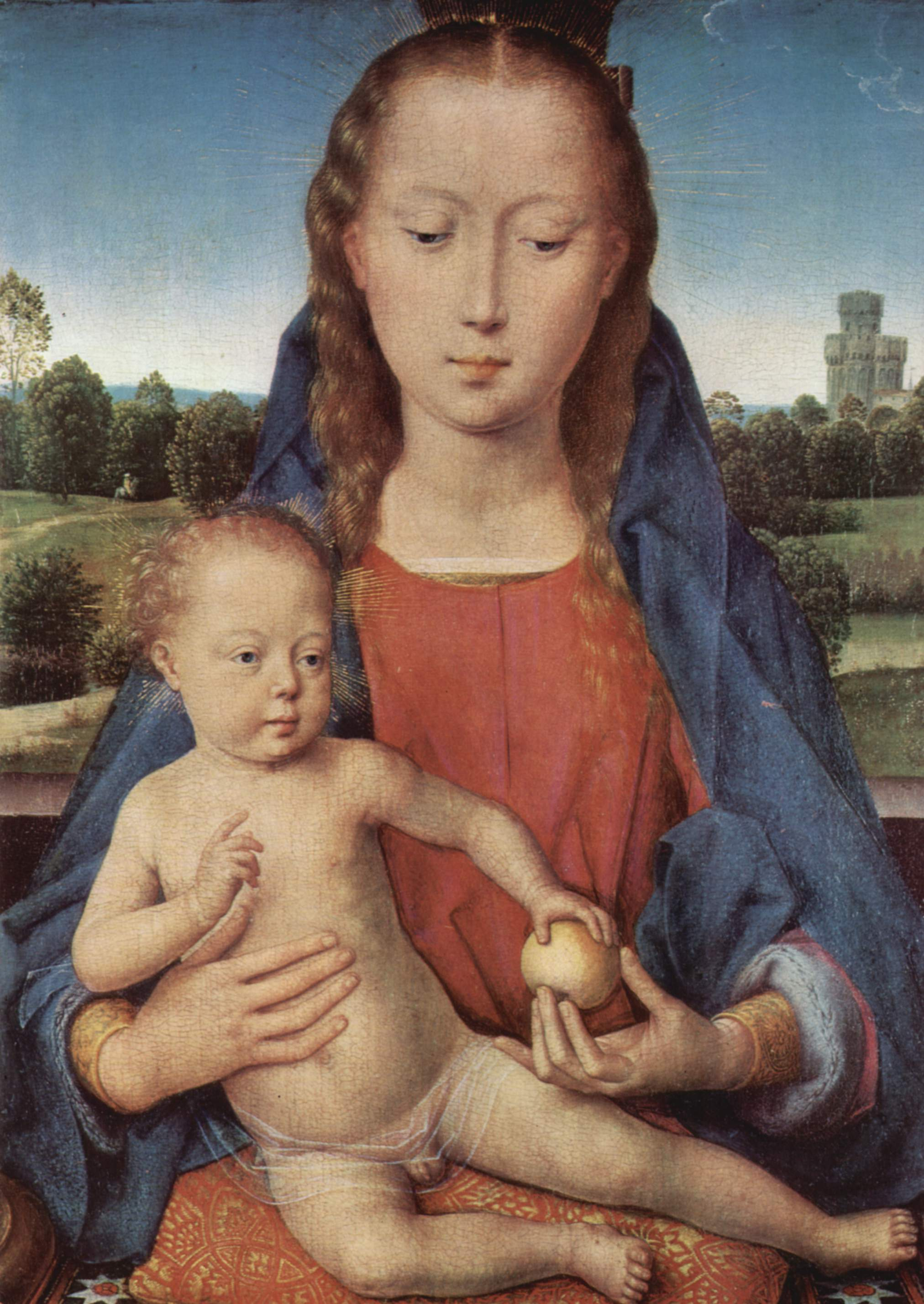
Madonna and Child

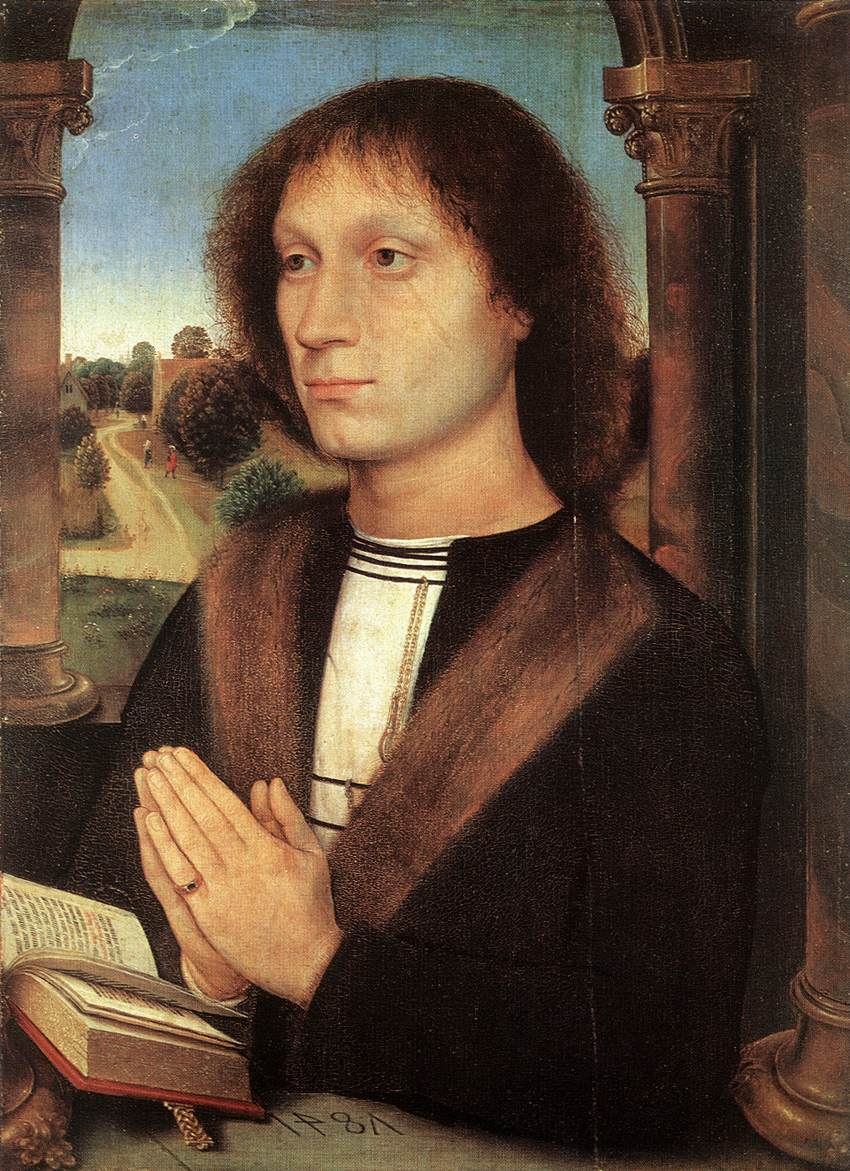
Benedetto Portinari

The Benedetto Portinari Triptych is a group of three 1487 oil on panel paintings by Hans Memling. It is named after its commissioner, who is probably the subject of its right-hand panel, now in the Uffizi in Florence. The left panel of Saint Benedict (Portinari's name-saint) and the central panel of the Madonna and Child are both now in the Gemäldegalerie, Berlin. All three panels are set within a single loggia, with a unified landscape background across all three, which proved a major influence on Umbrian painters, Perugino and Leonardo da Vinci.

The right-hand panel is not definitely Portinari (1466-1551) but the identification is highly probable, particularly due to a label on the reverse showing his motto DE BONO DANS MELIVS. Portinari is thought to have commissioned the work in Bruges. The Benedetto Portinari Triptych was taken to Florence to decorate the church of Sant'Egidio within the Hospital of Santa Maria Nuova, of which Portinari was patron.
