= Romanus of Subiaco =

Hermit in Subiaco, Italy

Saint Romanus of Subiaco
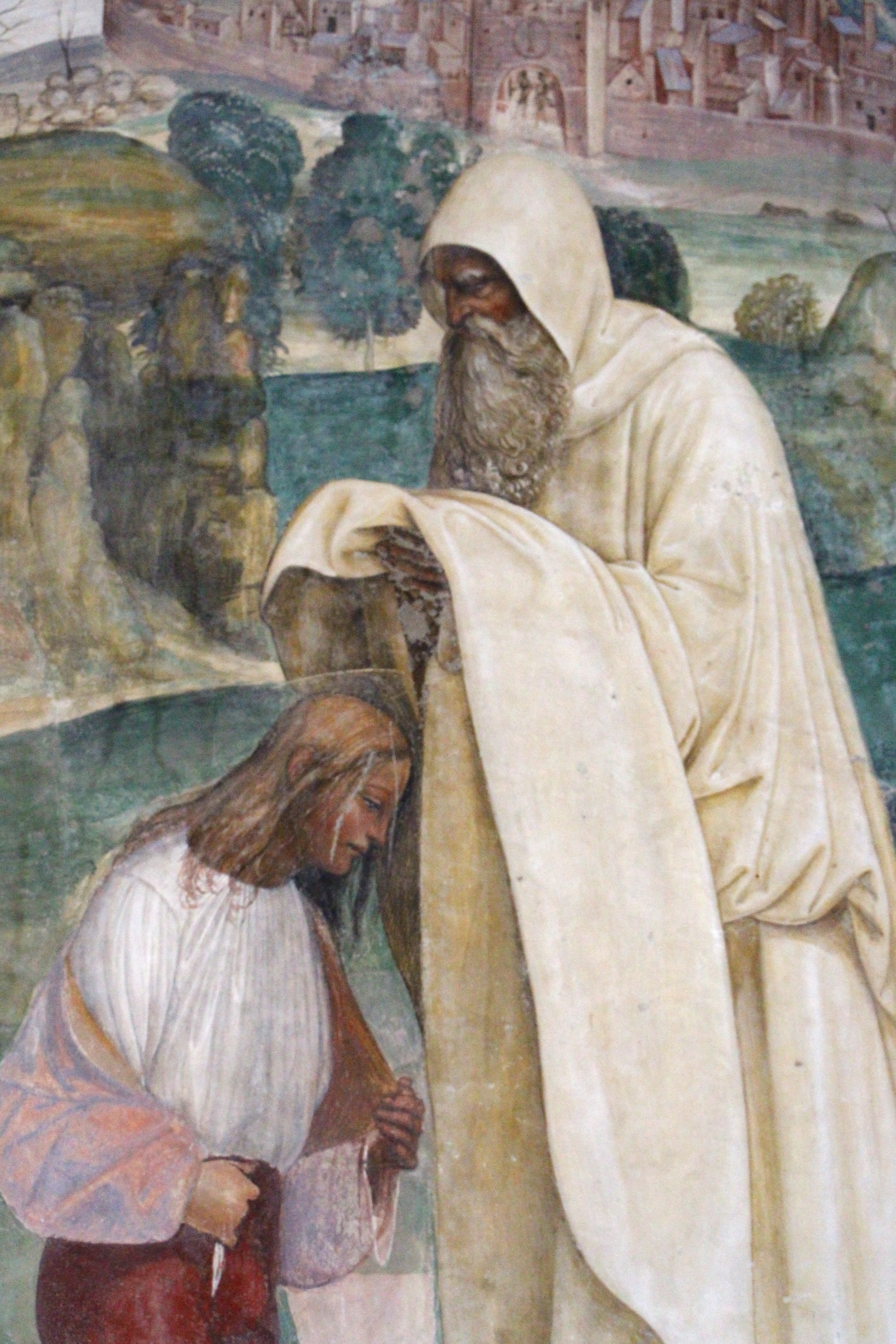
- Life of St Benedict, Scene 4: The Monk Romanus Dresses Benedict by Il Sodoma, 1505–08
- Died: c. 550 AD; Auxerre
- Venerated in: Catholic Church; Eastern Orthodox Church
- Feast: May 22

Saint Romanus of Subiaco (died c. 550 AD) was a hermit in the area around Subiaco, Italy.

He is remembered as having assisted and influenced Saint Benedict of Nursia, when the latter had just begun his life as a hermit. Romanus provided Benedict with clothing (a religious habit), food, and housing (in the form of a cave above the river Anio, which Benedict lived in for 3 years.

Romanus is said to have gone to Gaul, where he founded a small monastery at Dryes-Fontrouge (Druyes-les-Belles-Fontaines) near Auxerre. He died there about 550 and was venerated as a saint. He is sometimes identified with the Romanus of Auxerre who was venerated as Bishop of Auxerre on 8 or 6 October. He was buried at the monastery at Dryes-Fontrouge, and his relics are now located at Auxerre, Sens, and Vareilles.
