= Rocca Abbaziale =

Abbey in Subiaco, Lazio, Italy

Coordinates: 41.9258°N 13.0953°E

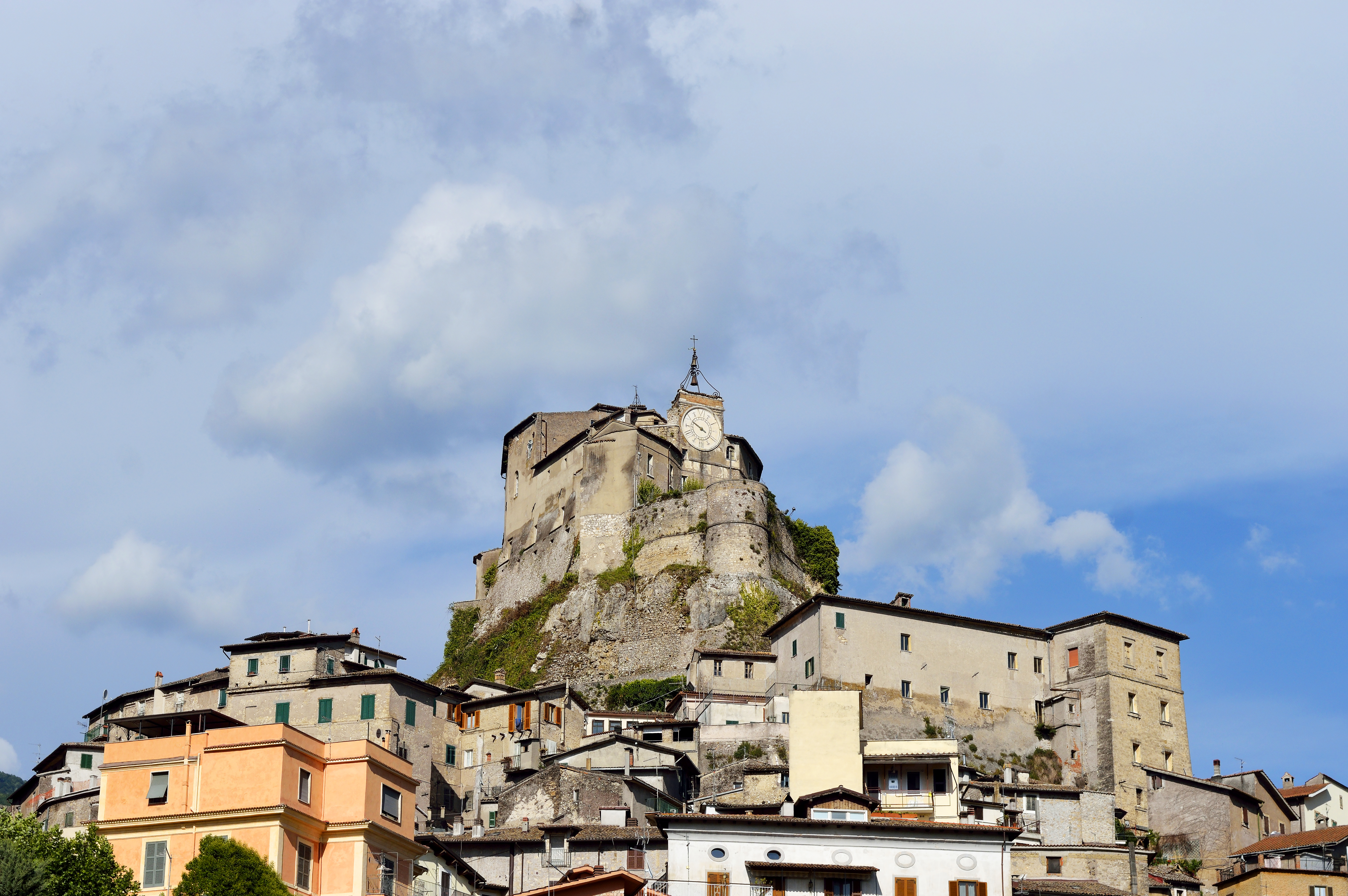
La Rocca Abbaziale de Subiaco

The Rocca Abbaziale (also called the Rocca dei Borgia) is an abbey, designed as a castle, in Subiaco, Lazio, Italy.

== History ==
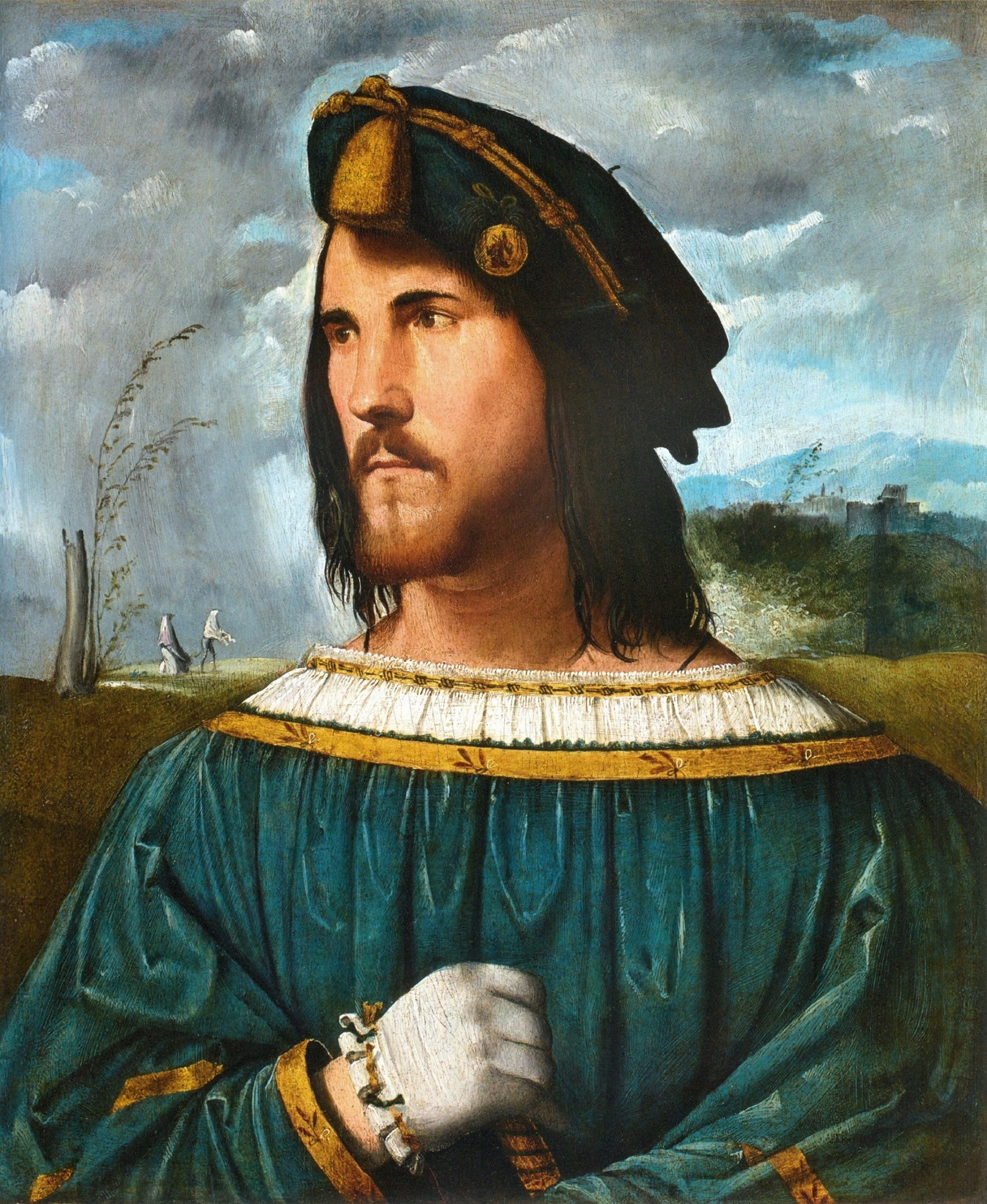
The Portrait of a Gentleman by Altobello Melone depicts Cesare Borgia, who was born in this castle.

The abbey, built in the late 11th century, was designed as a castle to establish control over the surrounding town. It was constructed with fortifications, prison cells, a watchtower, apartments and a chapel dedicated to St. Thomas. The castle was damaged by an earthquake in 1349 and was abandoned. It was looted and further damaged by townsfolk and was left uninhabited for many years thereafter.

In 1476, the castle was restored by cardinal Rodrigo Borgia who expanded the fortifications to defend the oldest part of the building. According to some historians, Cesare Borgia and Lucrezia Borgia were both born in the castle to Rodrigo's mistress Vannozza dei Cattanei. The castle was eventually purchased by the Colonna family.

In 1778, by order of Pope Pius VI, the architect Pietro Camporese further restored the castle, removing medieval elements like the prison cells and fortifications, and installing more modern features like a large clock. Subsequent popes used the castle as accommodation away from Rome.

== Features ==
The complex includes three distinct buildings, each designed in a different architectural style. Many of the original frescoes remain intact.

== Gallery ==
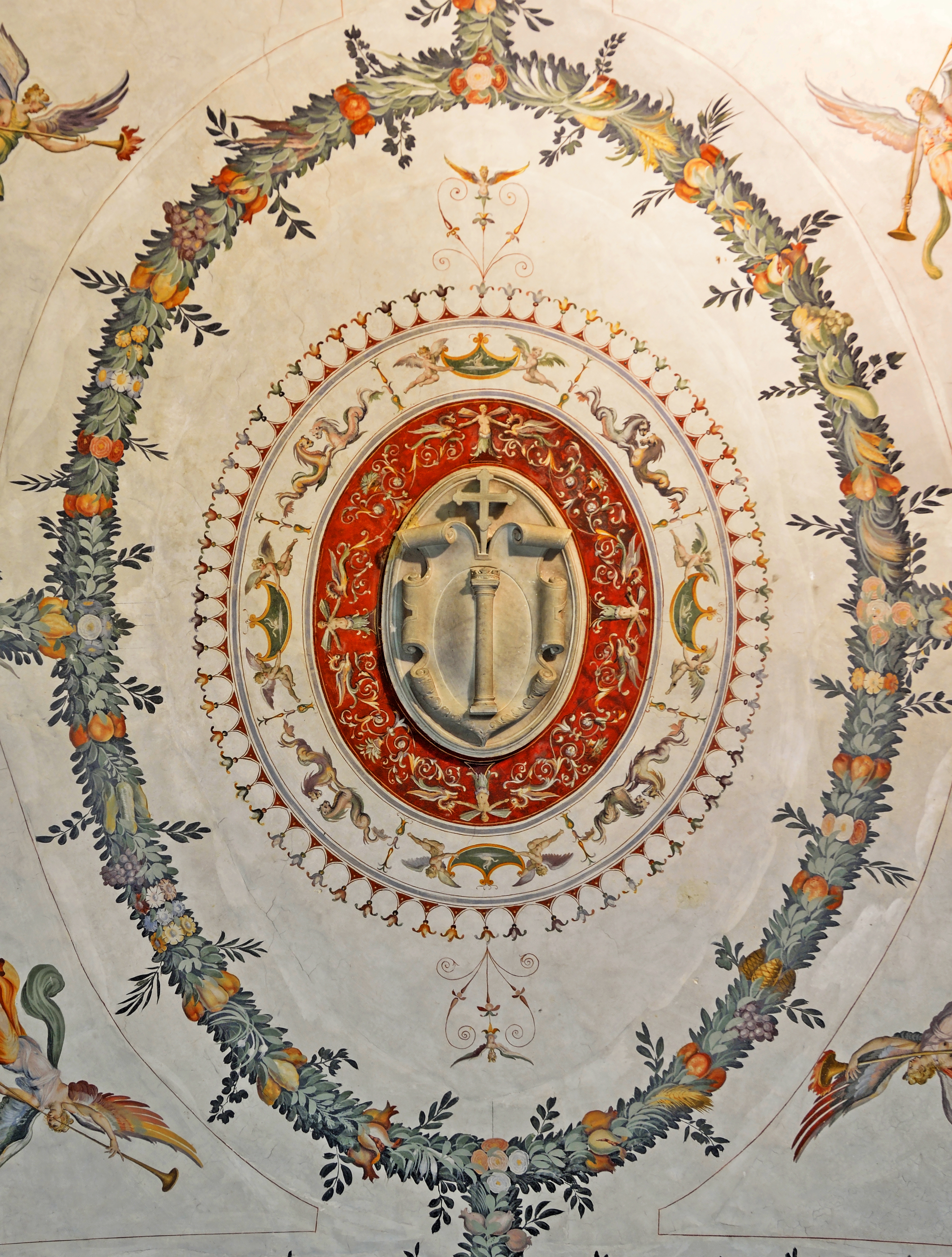
Symbol of Colonna family

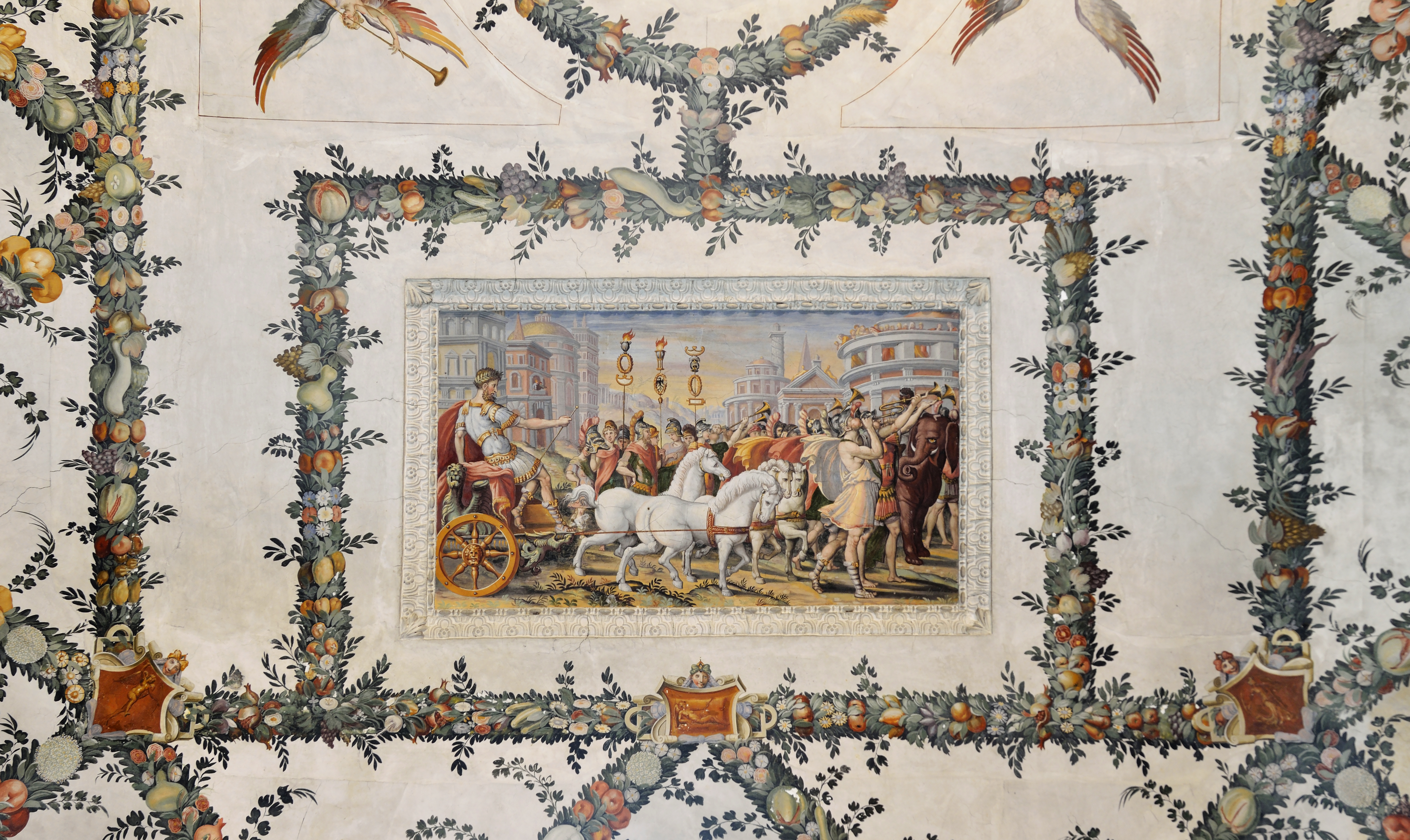
Fresco of Scipione Colonna

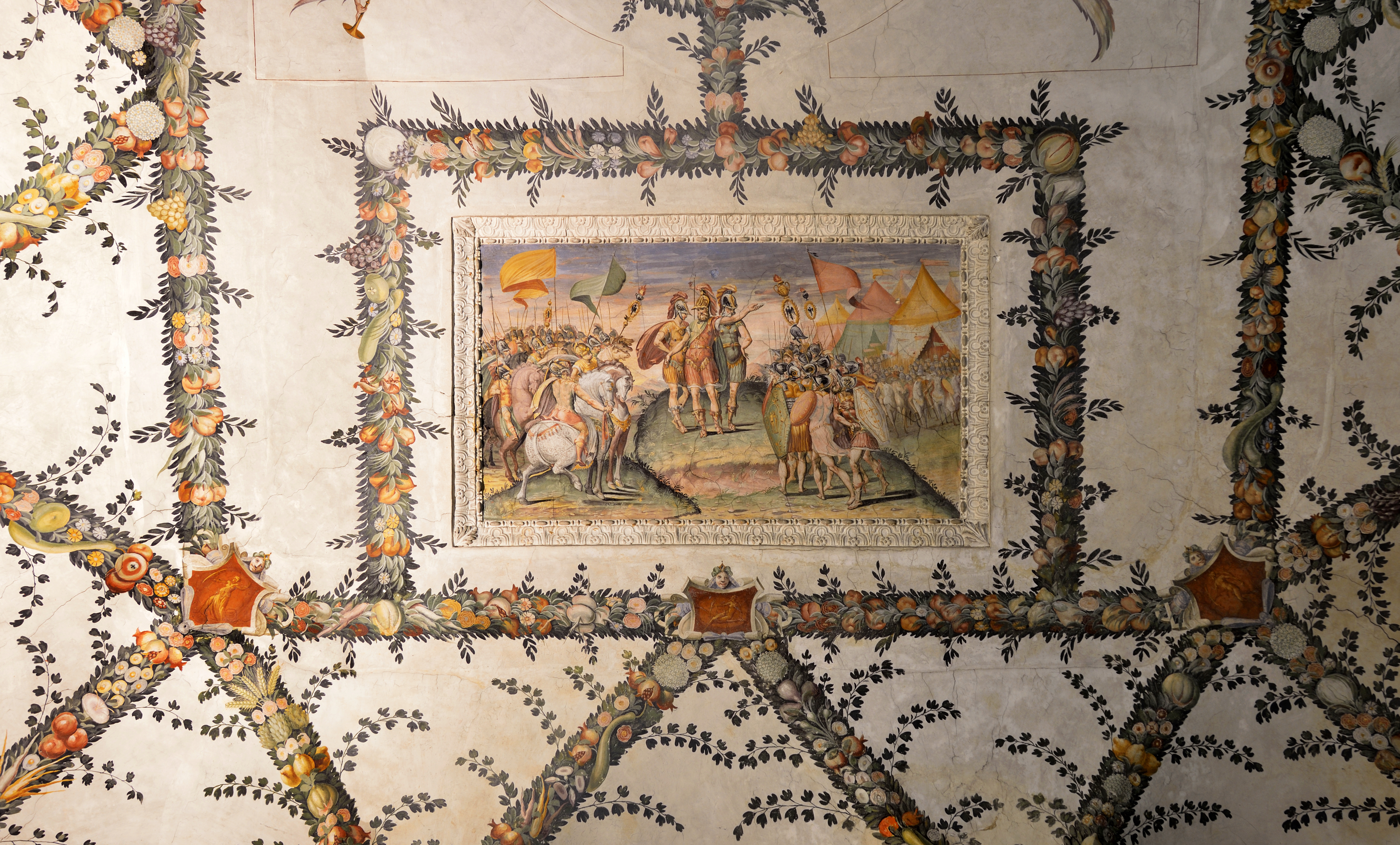

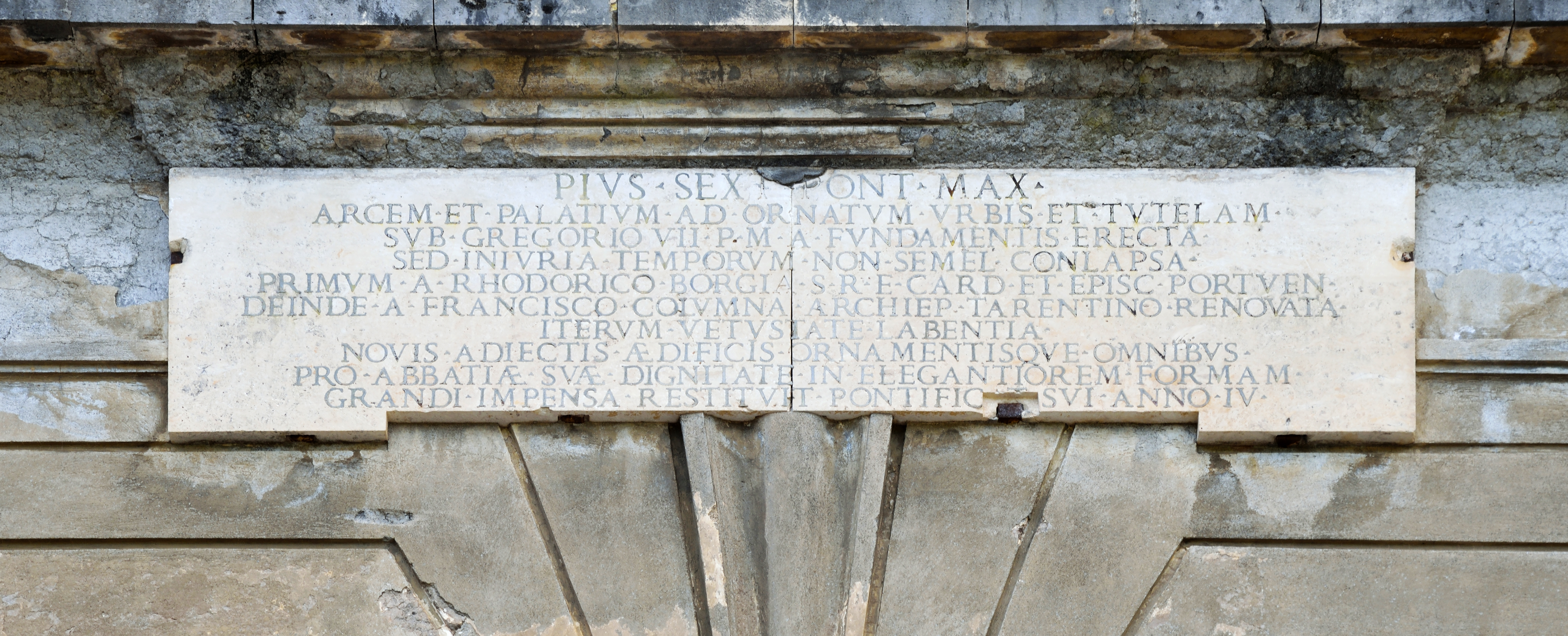
Plate on the entrance

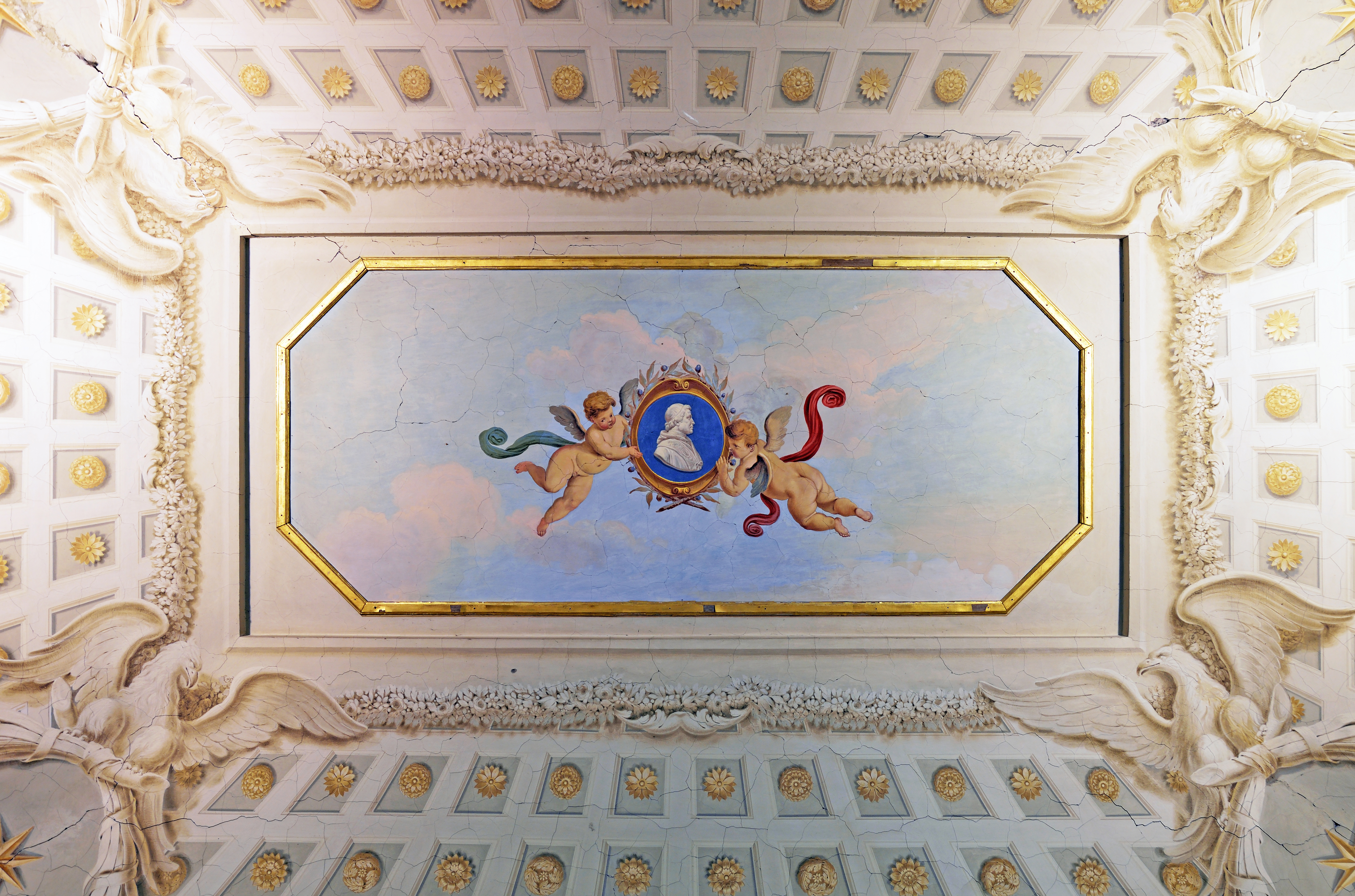
Fresco with Pope Pius VI and angels

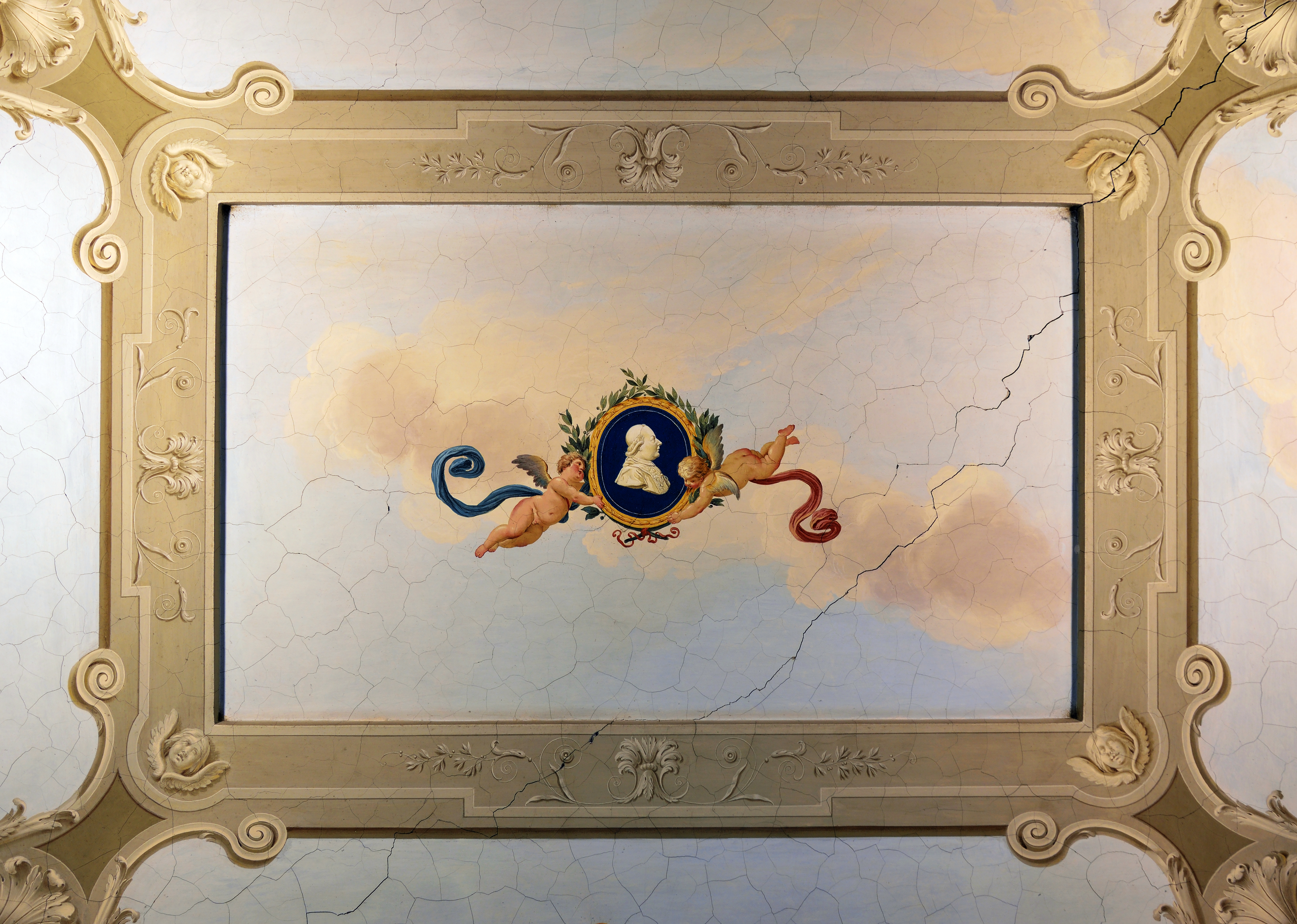
Fresco with Pope Pius VI

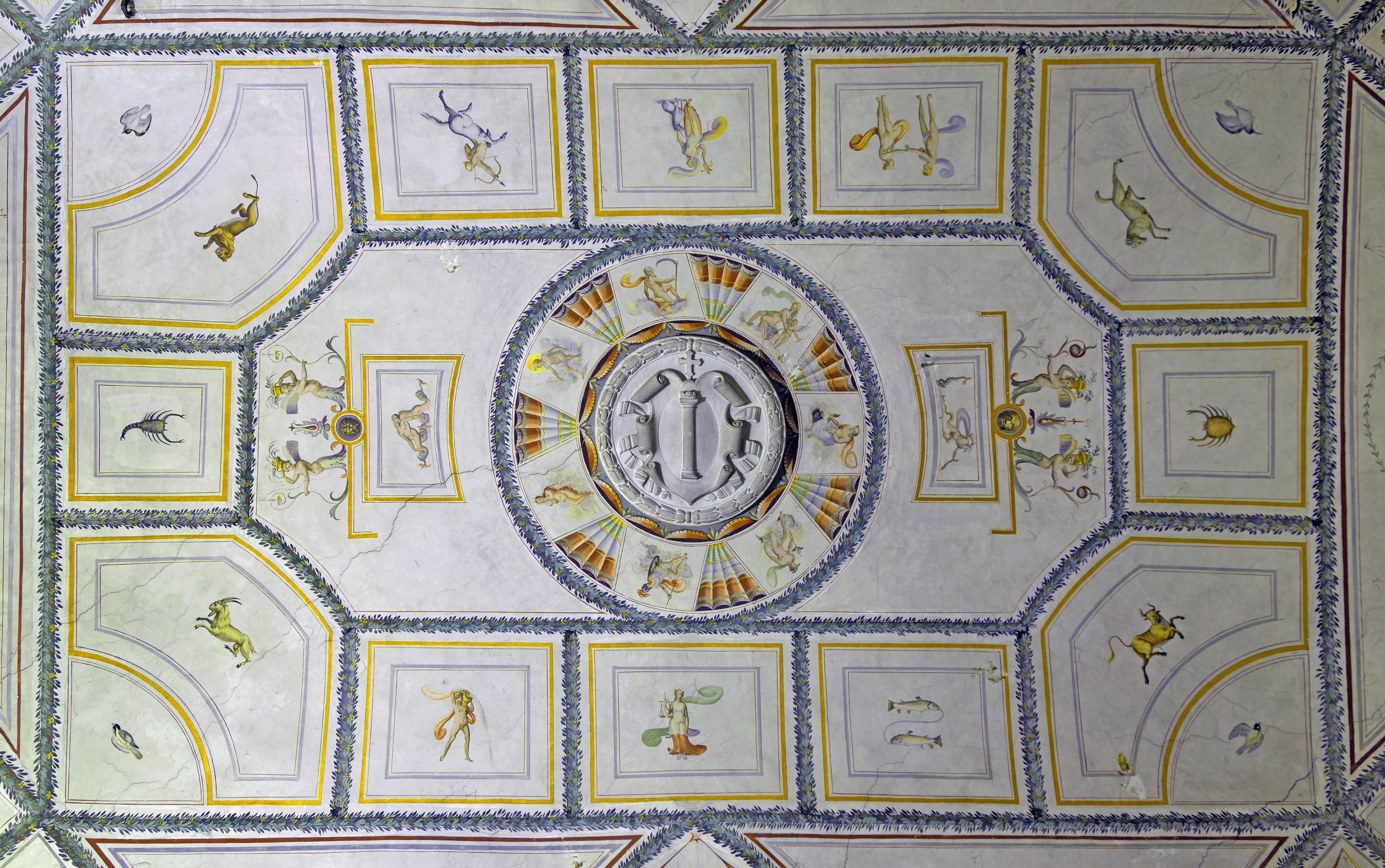
Fresco with zodiac signs

== See also ==
- List of castles in Italy
