= Subiaco Press =

15th-century printer in Italy

The Subiaco Press was a printing press located in Subiaco, Italy. The Press was established in 1464 by the German monks Arnold Pannartz and Konrad Sweynheim in the Abbey of Santa Scolastica, Subiaco. Sweynheim had worked with Johannes Gutenberg, the inventor of the mechanical movable-type printing press. Making use of the invention, Subiaco Press was the first printing press in Italy.

The first book printed at Subiaco was a work by 4th century writer Aelius Donatus; it has not been preserved. This was followed by Cicero's 1st century BC work De Oratore, printed at Subiaco in September 1465, a copy of which is preserved in the Buchgewerbehaus at Leipzig. The next book was the Lactantius 4th century work The Divine Institutes, printed in October 1465. In 1467, Augustine of Hippo's 5th century The City of God was printed.

These early books are notable for their typography. Unlike earlier German books, they were not printed in blackletter type. Instead, they were printed in a "half Roman" type, as in Italy there was a desire to use Roman characters. Furthermore, Lactantius's The Divine Institutes contains the world's first Greek printed characters. These were used for the extensive quotations in Greek which employed mobile letters now called "Subiaco type".

In 1467, Pannartz and Sweinheim left Subiaco and settled in Rome.

== Legacy ==
In the early 20th century, the Ashendene Press (a British craft printer) created the Subiaco typeface, based on the Pennartz and Sweynheim design. The original Pannartz and Sweynheim type had rather gothic characteristics but the Ashendene version eliminated the long "s" and completely redesigned the ⟨k⟩, ⟨w⟩ and ⟨y⟩. Today, Subiaco is owned by Cambridge University Press.
