= Subiaco, Lazio =

Subiaco
- Comune
- Comune di Subiaco
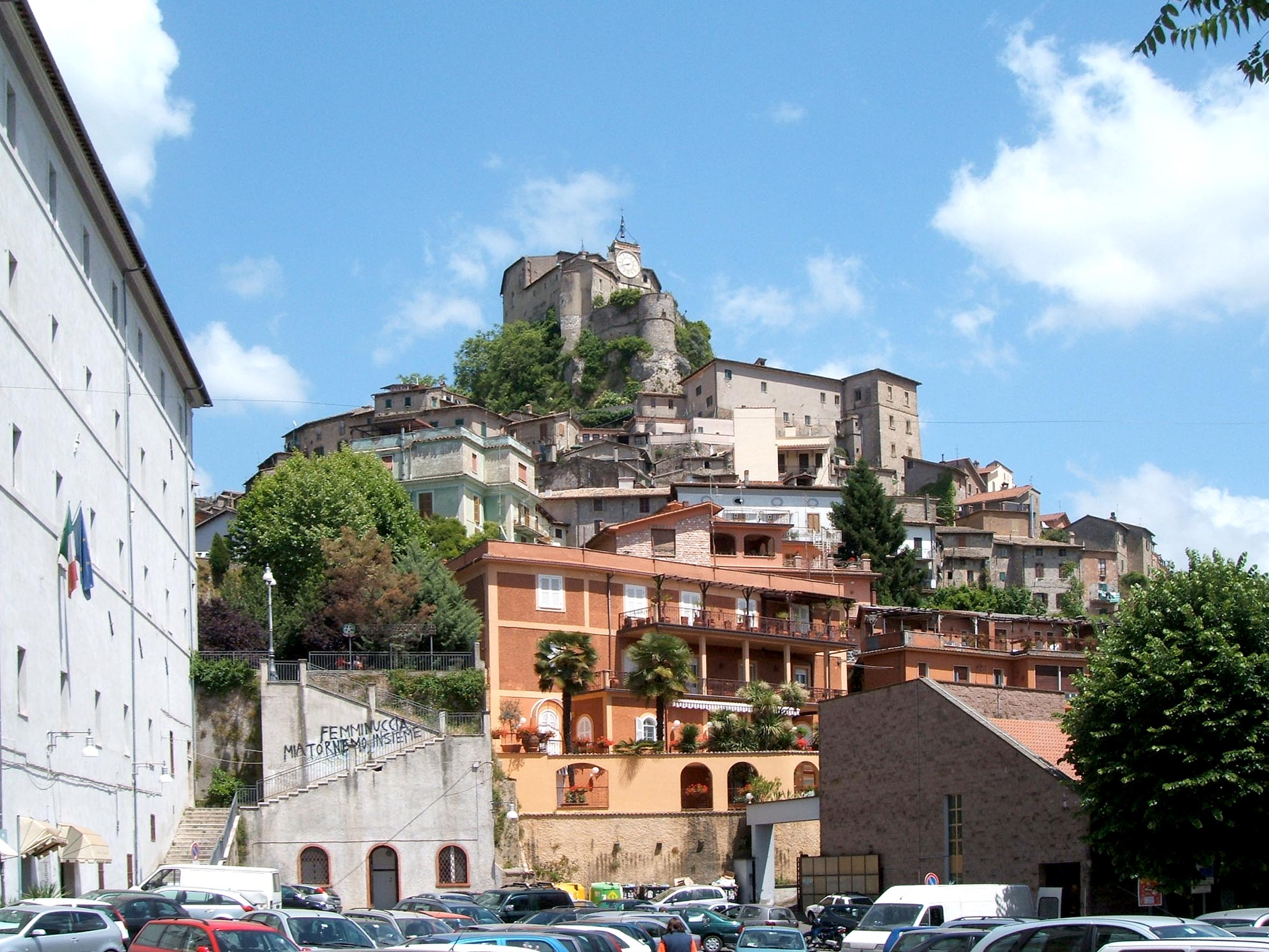
- View of Subiaco, Lazio

- Coat of arms

- Location within Italy Location within Lazio
- Coordinates: 41°56′N 13°06′E
- Country: Italy
- Region: Lazio
- Metropolitan city: Rome (RM)
- Frazioni: Cappuccini, Livata, Ponte Lucidi-La Torre, San Lorenzo, Vignola

Government
  - Mayor: Domenico Petrini

Area
  - Total: 63.23 km^{2} (24.41 sq mi)
- Elevation: 408 m (1,339 ft)

Population (1 January 2022)
  - Total: 8,490
  - Density: 134/km^{2} (348/sq mi)
- Demonym: Sublacense(i)
- Time zone: UTC+1 (CET)
  - Summer (DST): UTC+2 (CEST)
- Postal code: 00028
- Dialing code: 0774
- Patron saint: St Benedict
- Saint day: March 21
- Website: Official website

Subiaco (Italian /su.biˈa.ko/ or /suˈbja.ko/ in rapid speech) is a comune (municipality) in the Metropolitan City of Rome Capital, in the Italian region of Latium, about 50 kilometres (31 mi) east of Rome and 40 kilometres (25 mi) upstream of Tivoli on the River Aniene. It is a tourist and religious attraction because of its sacred grotto (Sacro Speco), in the medieval Monastery of San Benedetto, and its Abbey of Santa Scolastica. It is a member of the I Borghi più belli d'Italia ("The most beautiful villages of Italy") association. The first books to be printed in Italy were produced here in the late 15th century.

== History ==
Among the first ancient settlers in the area were the Aequi, an Italic people. In 304 BC they were conquered by the Romans, who introduced their civilization and took advantage of the waters of the River Aniene. The present name of the city comes from the artificial lakes of the luxurious villa that Roman Emperor Nero had built: in Latin Sublaqueum means "under the lake". The name was applied to the town that developed nearby. The biggest of the three Subiaco Dams was then the highest dam in the world until its destruction in 1305. After the fall of the Roman Empire, the villa and the town were abandoned, becoming almost forgotten ruins.

When St. Benedict, at the age of fourteen (c. 494), retired from the world and lived for three years in a cave above the River Aniene, he was supplied with the necessaries of life by a monk, St. Roman. From this grotto, St. Benedict developed the concepts and organization of the Benedictine Order. He built twelve monasteries, including one at the grotto, and placed twelve monks in each. In 854 a record noted its renovation. In this year, Pope Leo IV is said to have consecrated an altar to Sts. Benedict and Scholastica, who was St Benedict's sister, and another to St. Sylvester.

Another renovation took place in 1053 under Abbot Humbert of the Abbey of St. Scholastica. Abbot John V, created cardinal by Pope Gregory VII, made the grotto the terminus of a yearly procession, built a new road, and had the altars reconsecrated. By 1200 there was a community of twelve monks, on which Innocent III conferred the title of priory; John XXII in 1312 appointed a special abbot for the monks. A new road was built by the city in 1688.

The sacred grotto is still a favourite place of pilgrimage. On October 27, 1909, Pius X granted a daily plenary indulgence to those who received Holy Communion there and pray according to the intention of the pope (Acta. Ap. Sedis, II, 405). The Abbey of St. Scolastica, located about a mile and a half below the grotto, was built originally by St Benedict about 520, and endowed by the Roman patricians, Tertullus and Æquitius. The second abbot, St. Honoratus, changed the old monastery into a chapter house and built a new one, dedicating it to Sts. Cosmas and Damian. It was destroyed by the Lombards in 601 and the ruins abandoned for a century. By order of John VII, it was rebuilt by Abbot Stephen and consecrated to Saints Benedict and Scholastica.

Demolished once more in 840 by the Saracens and then in 981 by the Hungarians, it was rebuilt each time. Benedict VII consecrated the new church, and from then on the abbey was dedicated to Santa Scholastica. In 1052, Leo IX came to Subiaco to settle various disputes and to correct abuses; a similar visit was made by Gregory VII. Special favour was shown by Paschal II, who took the abbey from the jurisdiction of the Bishop of Tivoli and made it an abbacy nullius. Its temporal welfare was also a personal care of the popes. Among others, Innocent III at his visit in 1203 increased the revenues of the abbey.

With the decline of religious fervor, strife and dissension among the monks arose to such an extent that Abbot Bartholomew in 1364, by command of the pope, had to dismiss some of the disputatious monks and fill their places with religious from other monasteries. Numerous monks were brought in from Germany, and for many decades Subiaco was a center of German thrift, science, and art. Urban VI (1378–1389) abolished the position of abbot for life, withdrew from the monks the right of election, and made the administration and revenues the responsibility of a member of the Curia.

The arrival of German monks at Subiaco attracted other Germans. Printers Arnold Pannartz and Konrad Sweynheim established the Subiaco Press here in 1464 and produced an edition of Donatus, a Cicero, De Oratore (September 1465), Lactantius' De divinis institutionibus (October 1465) and Augustine's De civitate Dei (1467), which were the first books to be printed in Italy.

Pope Callixtus III, in 1455, gave the abbey in commendam to a cardinal. The first of these was the Spanish Cardinal Juan de Torquemada and the second Roderigo Borgia (later Alexander VI), who remodeled the Castrum Sublacence, once the summer resort of the popes, and made it the residence of the commendatory abbot. Many of these abbots cared little for the religious life of the monks and looked only for revenue. One example, Pompeo Colonna, Bishop of Rieti, commendatory abbot since 1506, squandered the goods of the abbey and gave the income to people described as unworthy subjects.

On receiving a complaint from the community, in 1510 Julius II readjusted matters and restored the monastic possessions. For spiritual benefit, a union was made between Subiaco and the Farfa Abbey, but it lasted only a short time. In 1514, Subiaco joined the Congregation of Santa Justina, whose abbot-general was titular of St. Scholastica, while a cardinal remained commendatory abbot. Even after this union there were quarrels between Subiaco and Farfa, Subiaco and Monte Cassino, essentially between the Germans and the Italians.

After this little is known from historical records about the abbey and the city until the 19th century. In 1798–1799 and 1810–1814 French troops under Napoleon entered the city, plundering the monasteries and the churches. In 1849 and 1867 Giuseppe Garibaldi conquered the city as part of his campaign to end the temporal rule of the pope and unify Italy: in 1870 the city became definitively part of the Kingdom of Italy.

In 1891, a Benedictine abbey founded earlier in western Arkansas, United States, changed its name to Subiaco as part of an effort to more closely align its teachings and practices to those of the famous abbeys of the Italian namesake.

In the first years of the 20th century, the Subiaco area was improved by national investment in infrastructure, with the connection to a railway, a hydroelectric plant and an aqueduct. Electricity was brought to the houses and a hospital was built. In World War II, however, Subiaco was bombed by Allied planes.

== Main sights ==
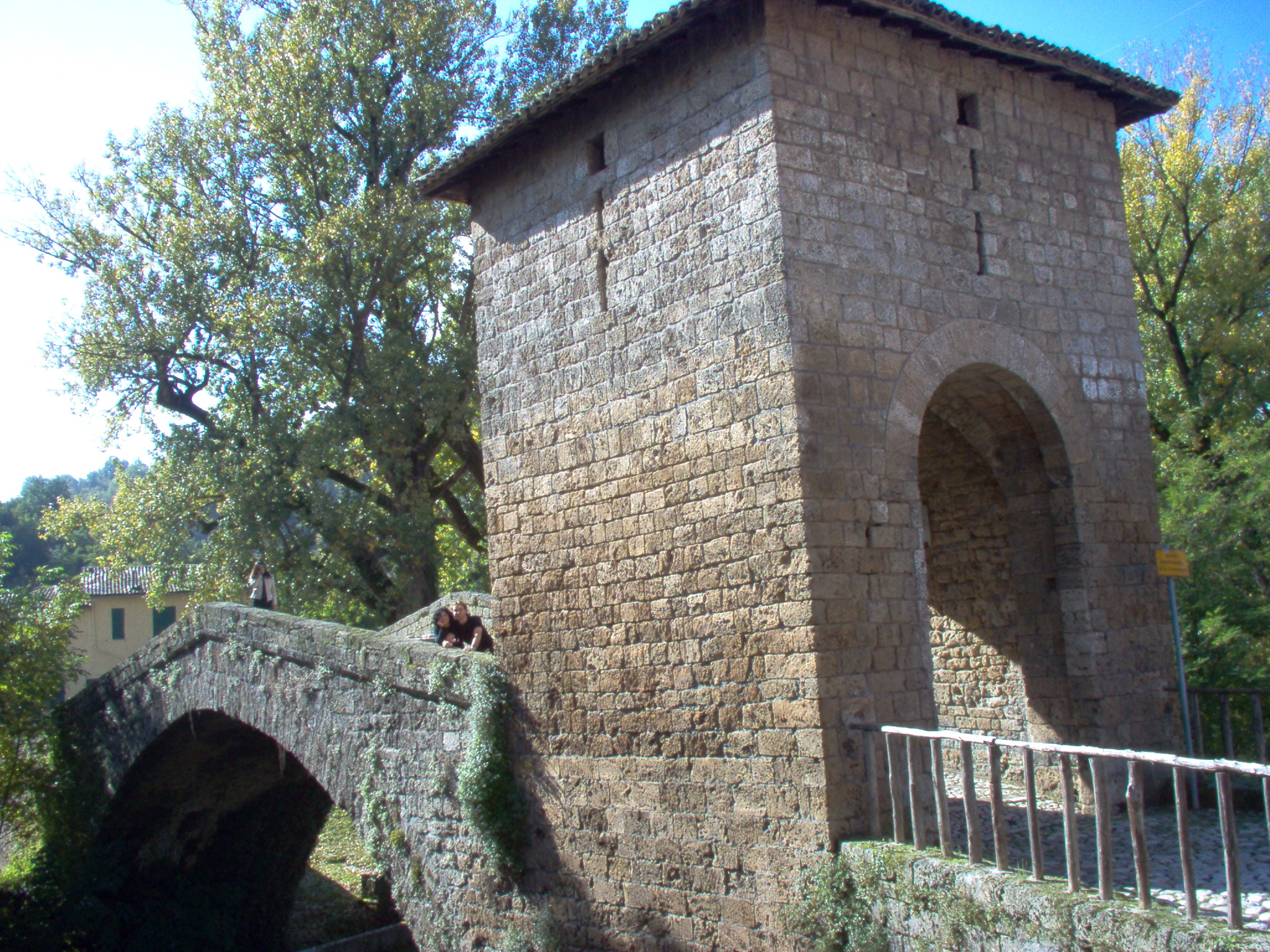
The medieval St. Francis' bridge

In addition to the two abbeys, including Abbey of Santa Scolastica, also noteworthy are:

- Nero's villa
- Rocca Abbaziale ("Abbot's castle"), a massive medieval edifice largely rebuilt in the 16th and 17th centuries
- Church of Saint Francis (1327), holds notable paintings from the 15th and 16th centuries.
- The medieval Ponte di San Francesco, a fortified bridge featuring a span of 37m
- The neo-classical churches of Sant'Andrea and Santa Maria della Valle

== People ==
- St Benedict of Nursia (480–543/547)
- Lucrezia Borgia (1480–1519)
- Gioacchino Pagliei (1852–1896), Italian artist
- Gina Lollobrigida (1927–2023), Italian film actress
- Pier Paolo Capponi (1938–2018), Italian actor
- Francesco Graziani (born 1952), Italian footballer
- Ashley Tshanda Ongong'a (born 2007), Kenyan-Italian skier
