= Ferrier of Tannerre-en-Puisaye =

Antique ferrier of Tannerre-en-Puisaye
- Ferrier antique de Tannerre-en-Puisaye (French)
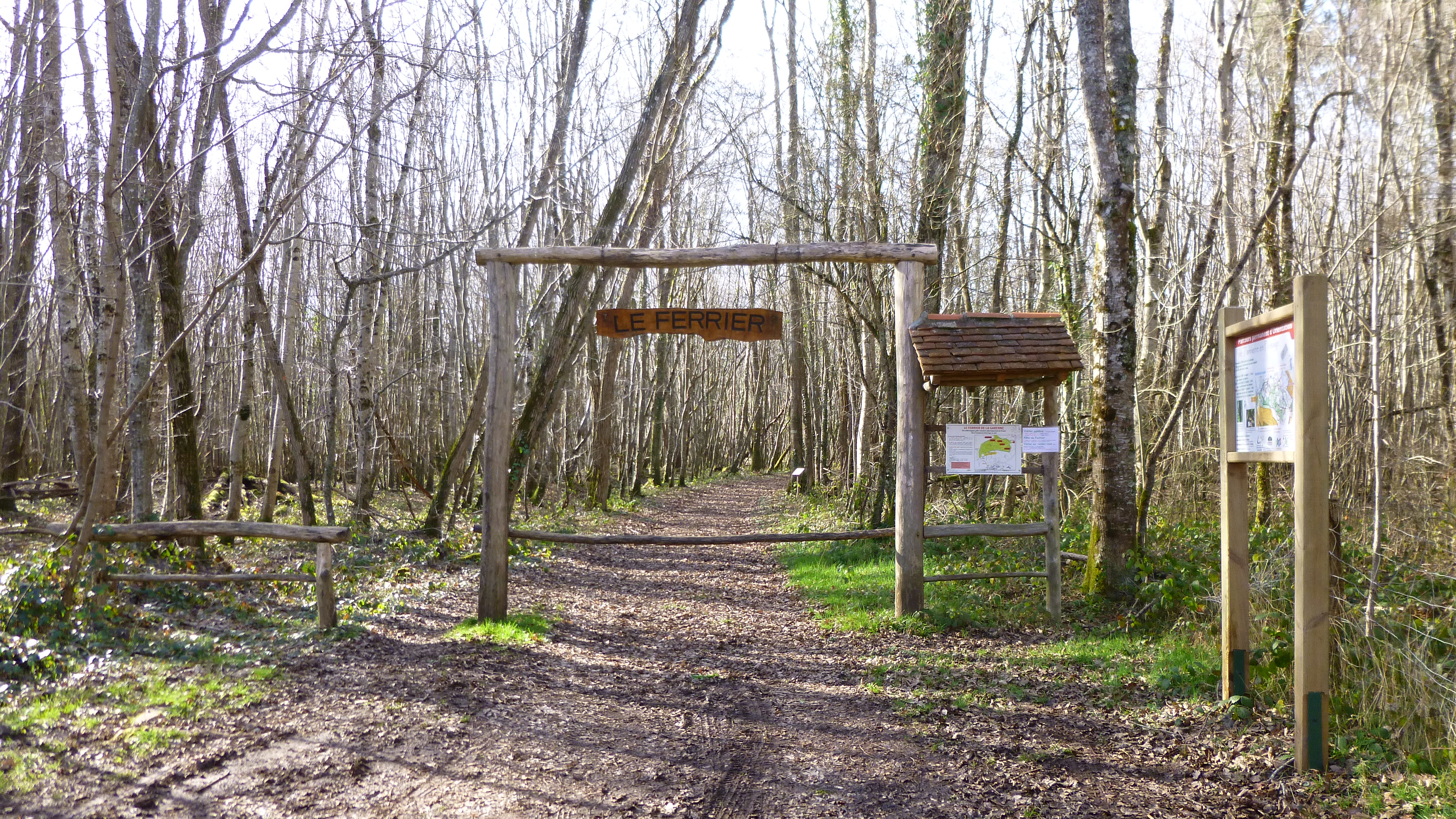
- Main entrance on route des Mussots

- Location of Antique ferrier of Tannerre in France
- 47.737386°N 3.138761°E
- Type: Mine
- Periods: Iron Age, Roman period, Middle Ages, Modern era
- Cultures: La Tène, Gallo-Roman, Merovingian
- Satellite of: Auxerre
- Location: Tannerre-en-Puisaye, Yonne, Burgundy, France

Site notes
- Elevation: 221 m (725 ft)
- Area: 30 ha (74 acres)
- Owner: Part council / Part private

Monument historique
- Official name: Ferrier antique - Archaeological site
- Designated: 1982
- Reference no.: Base Mérimée: PA00113898, Ministère français de la Culture. (in French)

The ancient ferrier of Tannerre-en-Puisaye, located in the village of Tannerre-en-Puisaye in Burgundy, France, is a historic site used for mining and working of iron. The works date from the Gallic and Gallo-Roman times. It is one of two largest ferriers in France and one of the largest in Europe. Industrial exploitation of the site ceased when it was classed as French Heritage monument in 1982.

== Etymology ==
The root of the word "ferrier" is "fer", which means iron. This word is quite unique to French : no other language has a word that specifically means "pile of iron slag" or "iron tailings heap": these terms, "slag" and "tailings", can apply to the extraction waste by-product of any metal and not just of iron.

== Location ==
The ferrier of Tannerre is in the northern part of Burgundy, in the Yonne department, in the commune of Tannerre-en-Puisaye, in and around the bois de la Garenne (Wood of La Garenne) that stands just north of the village.

Two thirds of its total surface of 30 ha (74 acres) are in a wood of approximately 75 ha (190 acres) surface. 15.2 ha (38 acres) of the southern part of the wood is owned by the town council, the rest of it being privately owned. The ferrier also spreads over inhabited areas and agricultural land.

The wood was likely much larger originally, as extracting iron from its ore required great quantities of charcoal. Metal extraction also requires a lot of water to wash the ore, a need fulfilled with the Branlin river flowing at the foot of the hill. The ore also needed to be crushed, and that was done in appropriate mills. Lastly, extracting iron required air to activate the bloomeries and the site is at the top of a hill, well exposed to winds.

This is not the only ferrier in Tannerre-en-Puisaye, a village that holds a large part of the 2,250 ferriers listed in Puisaye in 2008. Other large ferriers in Puisaye are in Aillant-sur-Tholon, Saint-Amand-en-Puisaye, Saint-Fargeau, Fontaines, Dracy, Mézilles.

== Description ==
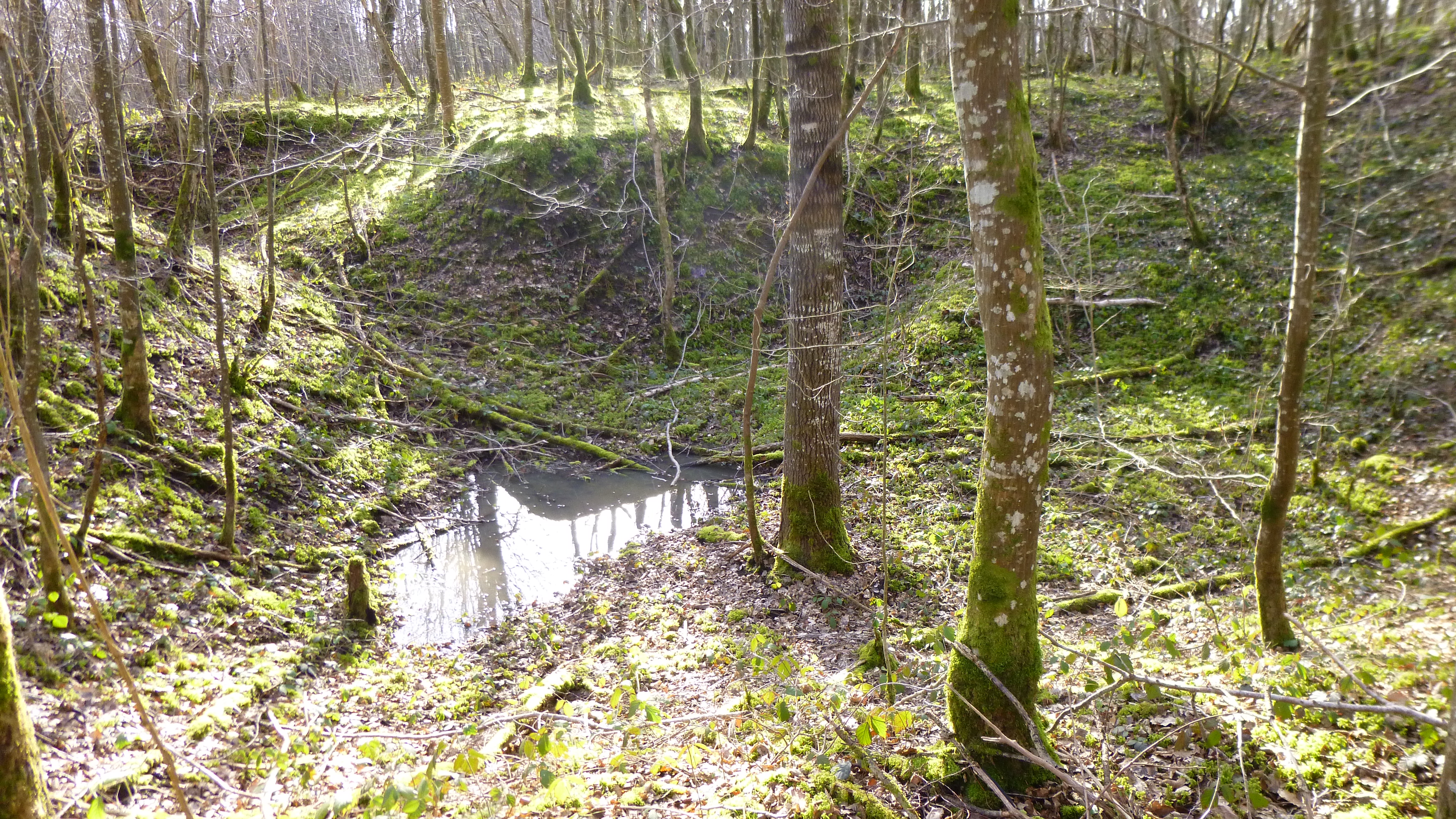
Mining hole retaining water among slag mounds

Those remains of ancient and recent exploitation have remodelled the land to heaps and holes: many holes from mineral extraction and from the removal of slag, many mounds of all sizes from miscellaneous small heaps to 15 m (49 ft) high mounds. The whole ferrier is spread over 30 ha (74 acres) surface. It is the largest ferrier in the Puisaye area, followed by those in Villiers-Saint-Benoît, Dracy, Toucy and several others, the largest of France with that of Les Martys (Aude departement), and one of the largest in Europe.

Of this surface, 15.2 ha (38 acres) are owned by the council and are classed as monument historique since October 15, 1982.

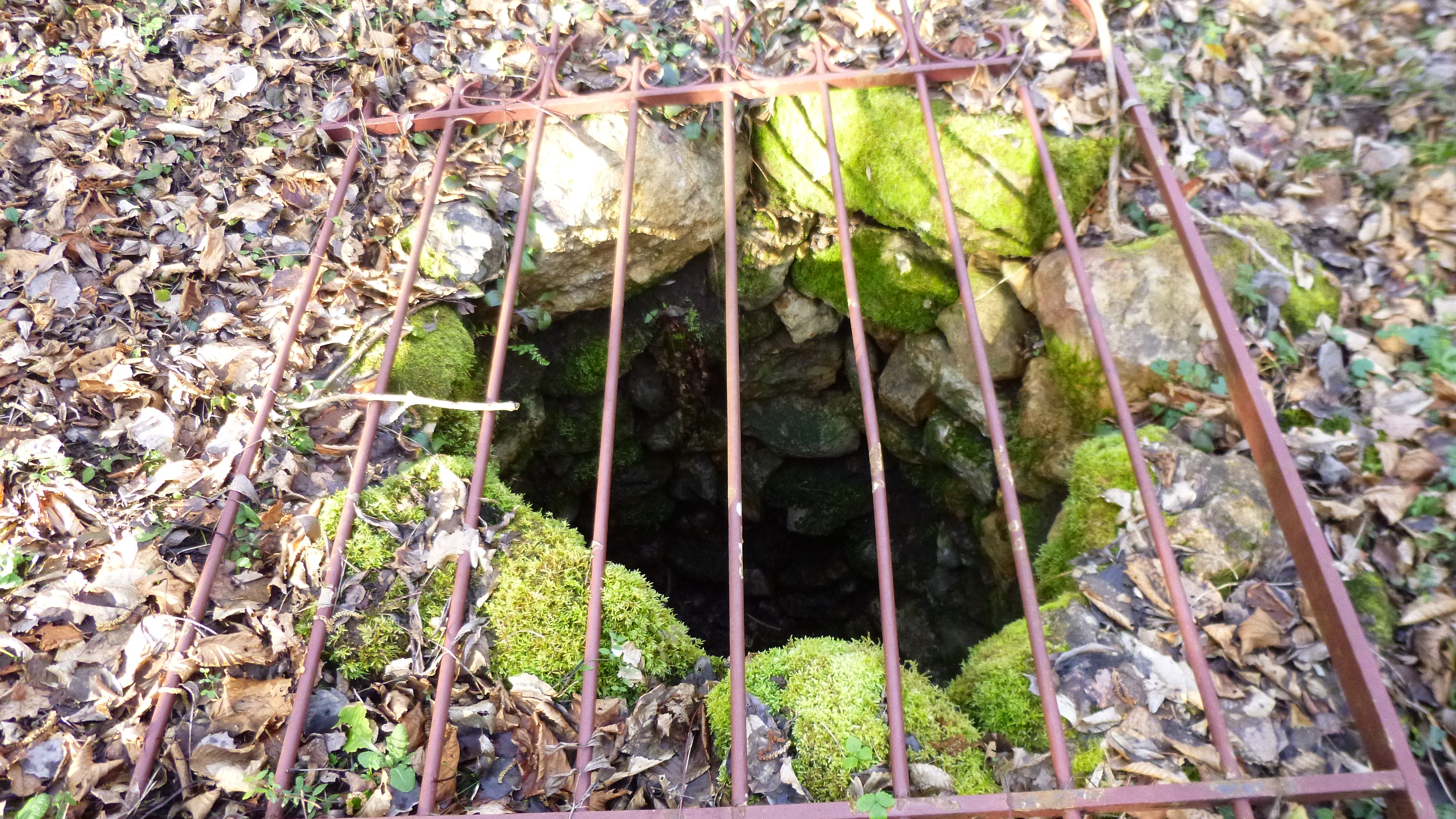
Gallo-Roman well

Three Gallo-Roman wells have been found, each 1.20 m (3.9 ft) wide and providing 2 m^{3} (71 cu ft) per hour. One of them is 6 to 8 m (20 to 26 ft) deep, the two others 7 to 9 m (23 to 30 ft) deep (the latter have been filled for security purposes). Of the two deeper wells, one is near the Motte Champlay fort and the other towards the end of the old rail track.

== History ==
Ores most commonly used in Tannerre were red hematite (Fe_{2}O_{3}) (Note: Hematite or haematite is the mineral form of iron(III) oxide (Fe_{2}O_{3}), one of several iron oxides. Hematite also contains traces of titanium (Ti), aluminium (Al), manganese (Mn) and water (H_{2}O).) (local hematite bearing a 70% iron content) and limonite ($\ce{FeO(OH).\mathit{n}H2O}$), (Note: The formula given here for limonite $\ce{FeO(OH).\mathit{n}H2O}$ is not entirely accurate as the ratio of oxide to hydroxide can vary quite widely.) a hydroxide hematite (here with 60% iron content). Marcasite, an iron sulfide (FeSFe_{2}), was little used.

=== Antiquity and Middle Ages ===
Tannerre's ferrier, and iron extraction in the area, was active from the Iron Age up to the Middle Ages, with most production taking place during the Roman occupation.

In the early times the ore was picked straight from ground surface, with no digging involved. Surface ore eventually became all used up, so mining holes were dug down to 2 m (6.6 ft) deep; many examples of that operation remain within and around the ferrier, generally partly refilled and often retaining water. Later, deeper wells were dug as well as galleries with pit props.

Iron was produced in bloomeries made of clay, using the technique of « direct iron reduction », and forge-wrought on the spot. The people living there were Senones. This place is less than 40 km (25 mi) (on a beeline) from the Loire river and from the Bituriges, to whom is attributed the discovery of tinning and who were held among the best regarding their metalwork in general and ironwork in particular. The oldest bloomeries studied in France, some "trapped slag" furnaces (fours à scories piégées) giving off only a low production, are in the area of Sens only 50 miles away to the north and may date from the 7th century BC. There are many of those in the south of Puisaye, their quantity decreasing towards the north of that area. Towards the end of the Tene era (from about 500 BC to the Roman conquest in the 1st century BC), all the large exploitation sites of Puisaye seem to have increased their size and perfected their equipment.

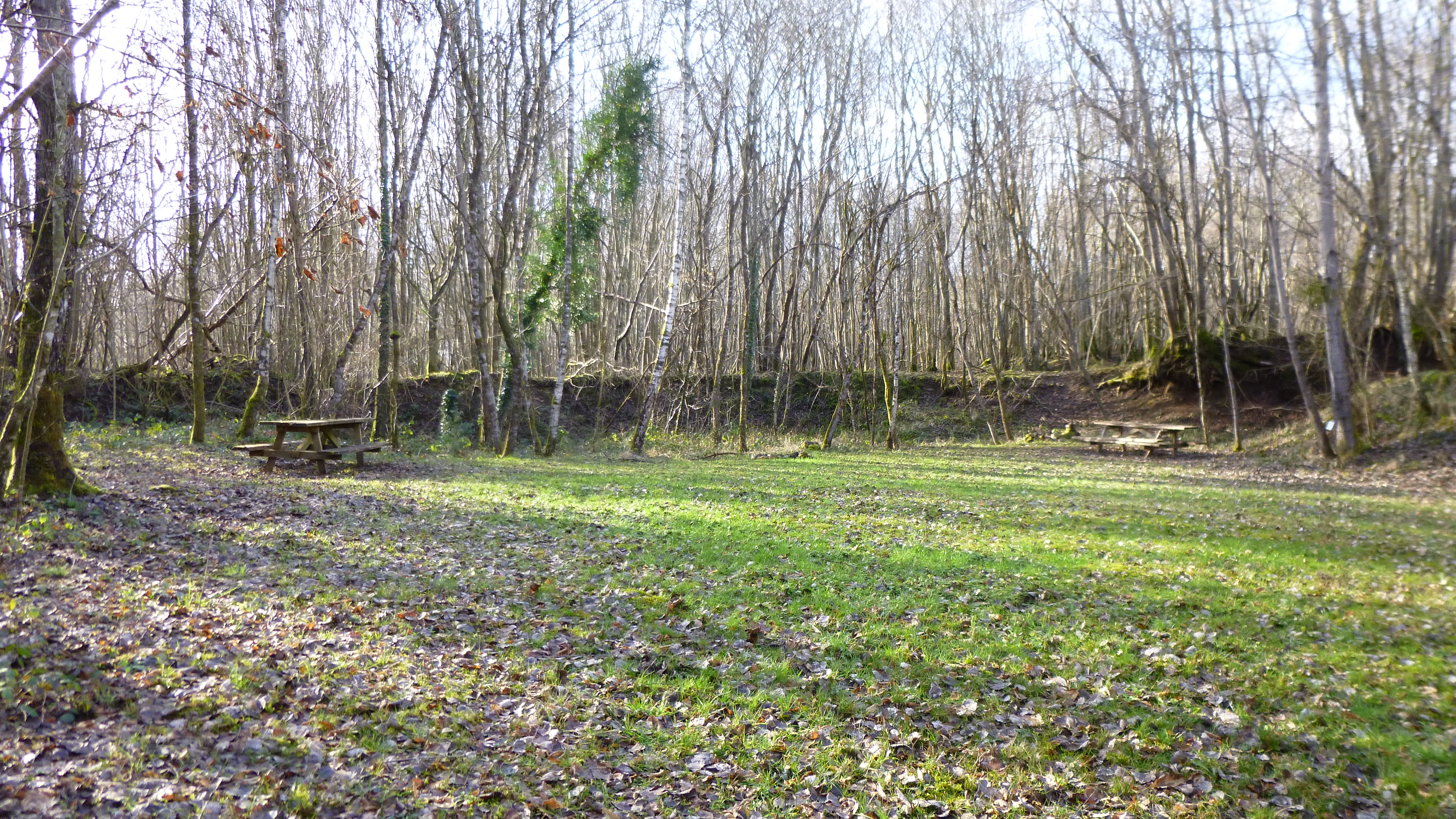
Location of the Motte-Champlay fort

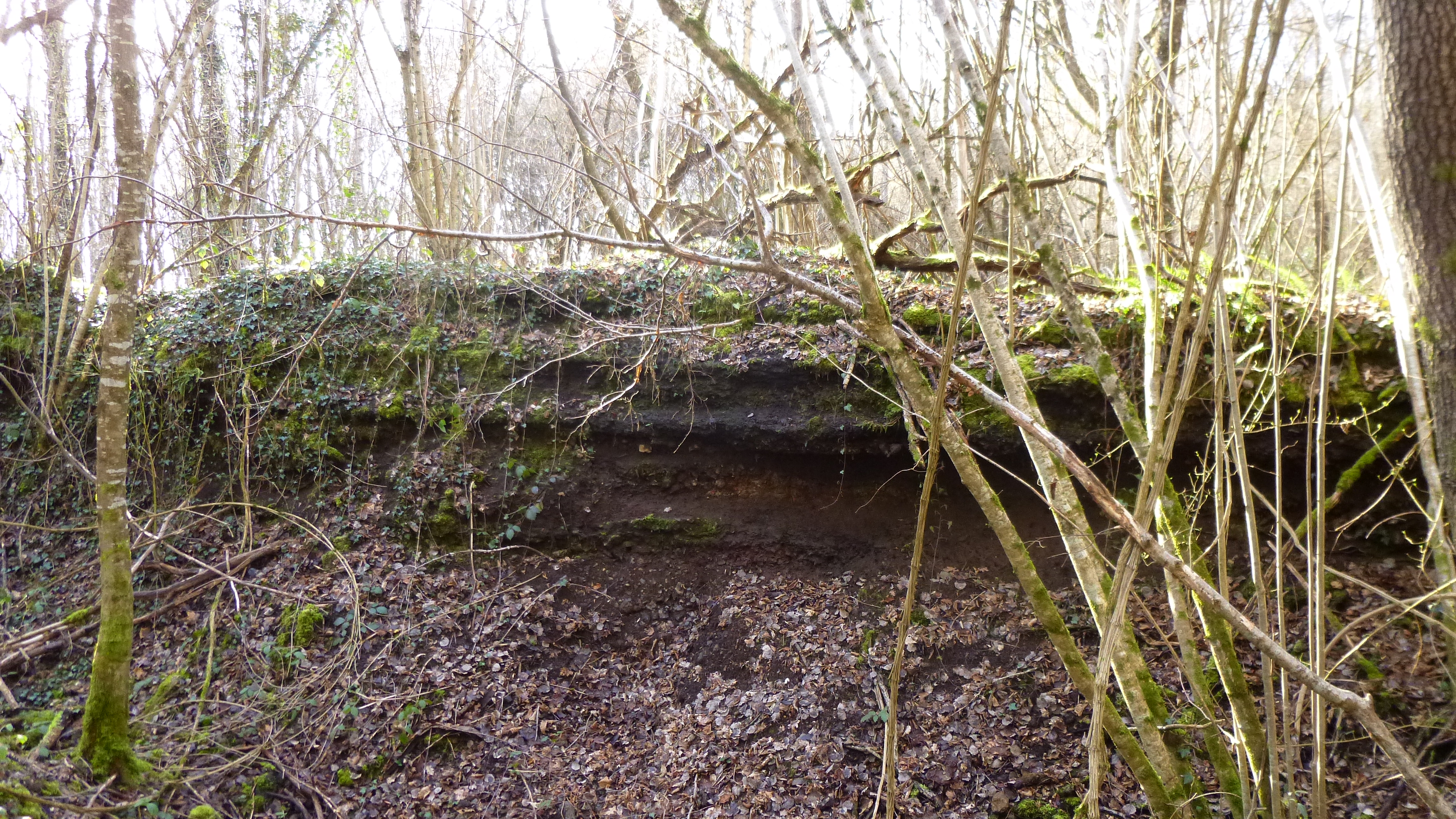
Heap of slag revealing its layers

Already largely present in Celtic times, (the Iron Age in western Europe started around 800 to 700 BC), the site's production tremendously increased with the Romans intent on grabbing resources in conquered territories. They ordered the construction of very large workshops, while private production did not significantly slow down. The means and techniques that they put to use produced what is called in French « scories à laitier » literally « milk slag » (Note: « Scories à laitier » or « milk slak » is slag that contains little or no more iron. At that stage it takes on a sort of milky shine, hence the French name.) of the same quality than those of modern blast furnaces. Production during the 300 years of Roman occupation is estimated at 80% of total production of the site, all periods included. This means that in 300 after JC, the ferrier already occupied more or less the same surface as now. A Gallo-Roman village was most probably built on the hill side.

==== Early Middle Ages ====
After the Romans left, mining and smelting activity notably decreased in the area. During early Middle Ages, small ferriers remained active around Saint-Fargeau as far as Lavau and to the north of Villiers-Saint-Benoit. However, the records mention forging activities much more often than iron production. This decrease continued until the near-extinction of this activity towards the end of the High Middle Ages, leaving behind as the only visible remains these mounds of slag, the ferriers, that in Tannerre reached 15 metres (49 ft) high for the lowest and are mainly found in the northern part of the ferrier.

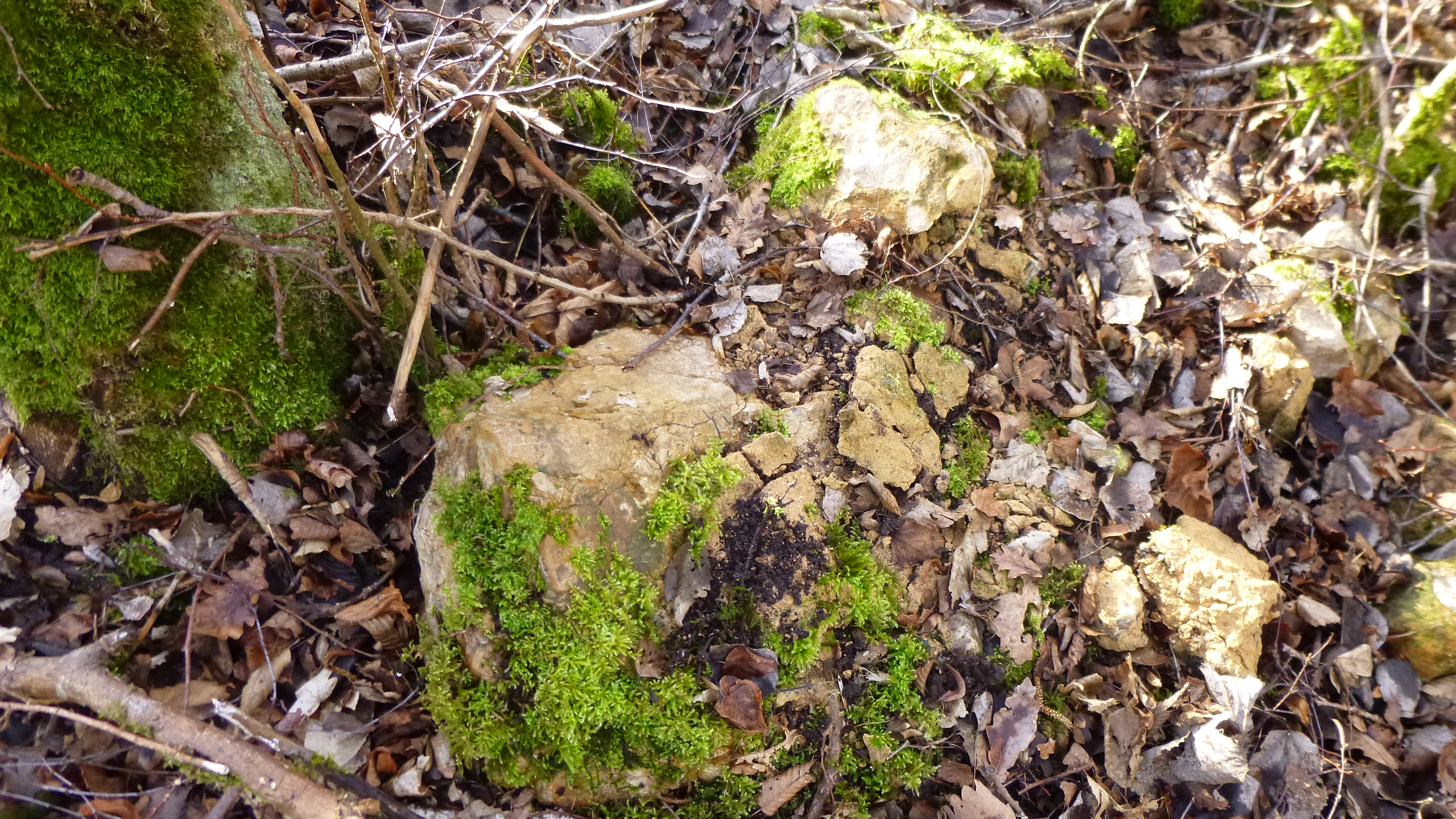
Blocks of lime and mortar from the Motte-Champlay

==== Late Middle Ages ====
Towards the 10th century an area in the western part of the ferrier was levelled and a fort built there to guard the road to Paris. That fort is the Motte Champlay. It was taken over in 1359 by the English captain Robert Knolles, in the service of Charles II of Navarre during the latter's attempt to take over the French crown. The Motte Champlay fort was a good base for plundering travellers; Knolles left there his lieutenant Dauquin of Halton to hold Motte Champlay. An accord was made between Knolles and the Constable of France Robert de Fienne following the Treaty of Brétigny in 1360: upon leaving the Puisaye area, Motte Champlay was razed to the ground by the Anglo-navarre troops - as well as the village (that likely was not part of the agreement) and the fort in the lower part of the village. Tannerre nearly died for more than two centuries and never again found its intense activity of old. The Motte Champlay was not rebuilt. Some large mortared blocks of its walls and foundations were found in 2009 during a land survey.

=== Modern era ===
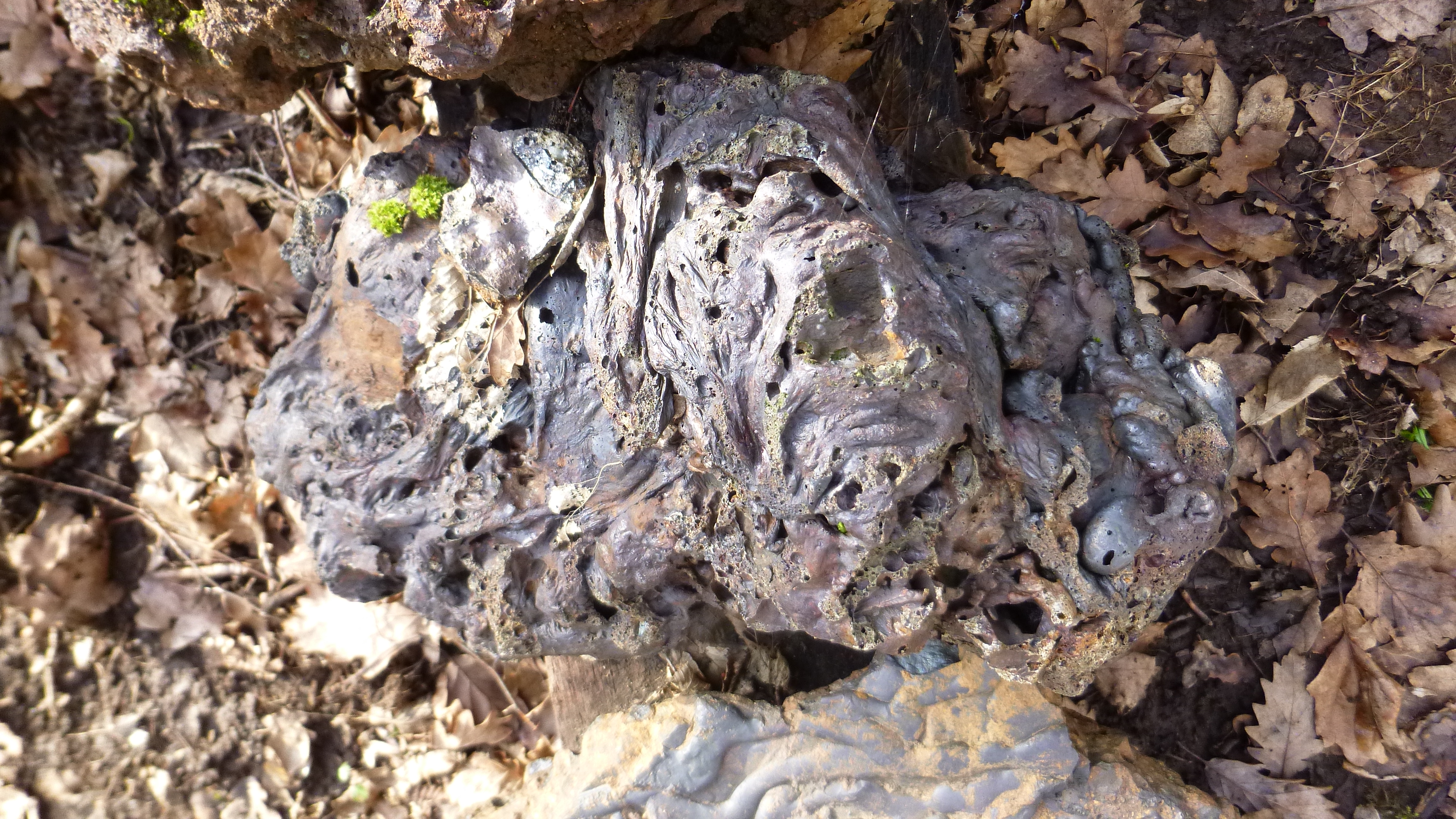
Slag, bloc produced on-site

At all periods, slag was occasionally used for road repairs and strengthening the road surface; that was called "ferrer" or "iron-loading" roads and other areas driven over. But the quantity of material taken overall from the antique ferriers for that purpose remained low.

From 1900 to 1982 the ferriers' mounds were used on industrial scale, systematising the use (a trend already started in the 19th century) of slag to "iron-load" the roads and for rail track ballast.

Besides that, as the slag was still rich in metals, it was sent to Lorraine's blast furnaces (among which those of Homécourt) to extract the remaining iron and manganese. Indeed, Puisaye slag was more iron-rich than Lorraine ore, the latter's iron content then nearing only 30%. So Tannere's slag was used as bulk material to the usual charge: the load was said to be "enriched".

Moreover, the slag in Tannerre contains silica, that for a blast furnace is the equivalent of flux for a bloomery: it allows for the ore to melt at a lower temperature, which made the task easier for blast furnaces and cured their malfunctioning. During those times a complete network of railway tracks covered the ferrier along with switches, turntables, derailers, workshop and well. The workmen built lodgings on-site for themselves, with a mess.

World War I stopped activity on the site; it began again in 1916 with the arrival of refugee workers, Belgians and Italians. At the end of the war, Serbian workers came to the ferrier. At the end of World War II heavy equipment such as excavators and other large machines arrived. Using these considerably modified the ferrier in many ways, notably by greatly upsetting the order of archaeological strata in many places and thus locally preventing near-any historical tracing.

This new exploitation stopped when the ferrier was classified as monument historique in 1982, leaving for the future researchers a vast land open for investigation; it has been so disturbed that Henri de Raincourt, the minister present at the inauguration in September 2009, compares it to Verdun or the ligne Maginot.

== Promotion of the site ==
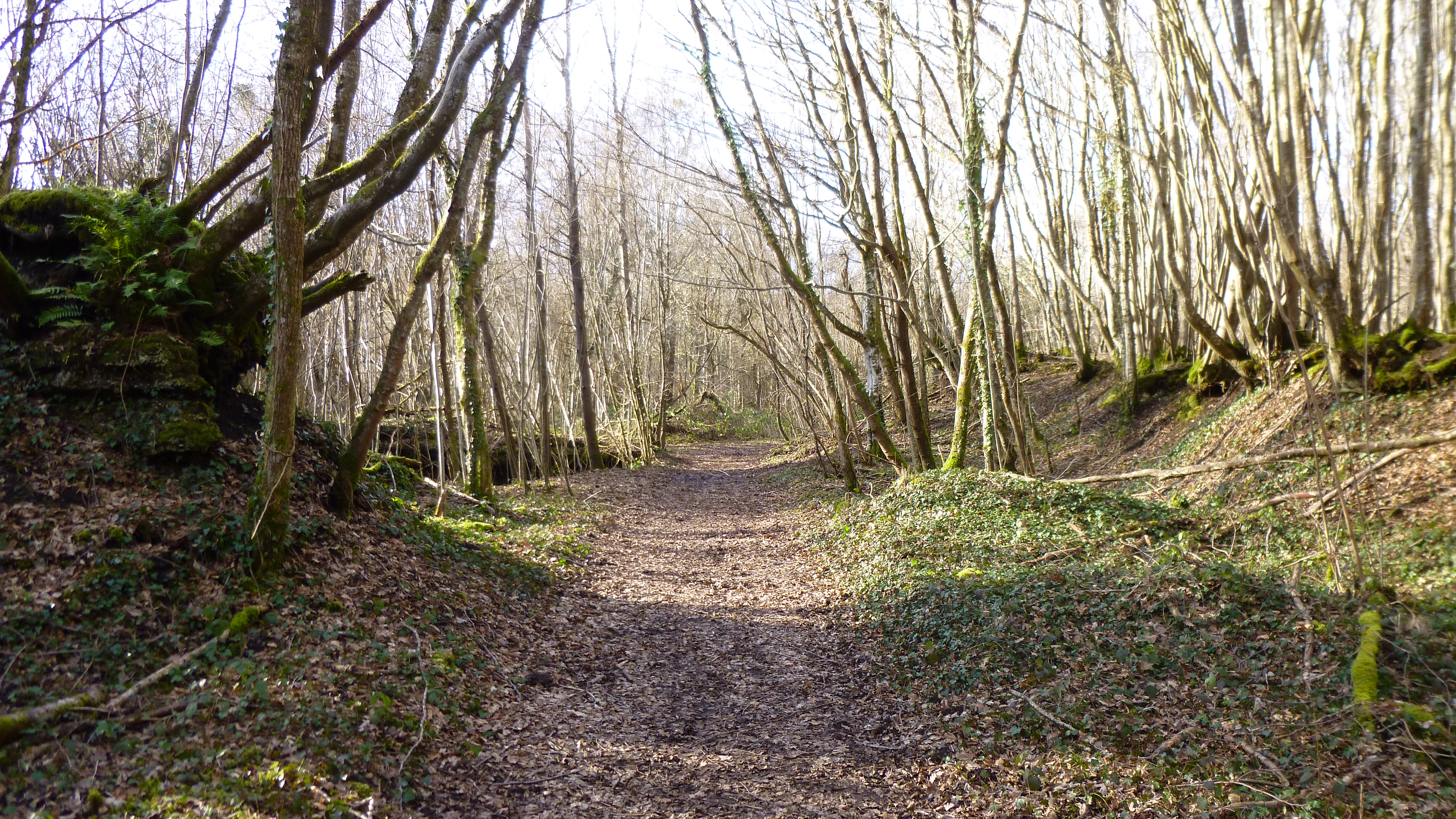
A welcoming path among mounds of slag and trenches

After the land was abandoned for 20 years, the "association du ferrier de Tannerre", created in 2008, did a lot of work to make the site known to the public. Previously to the opening a tremendous amount of cleaning was necessary, as the site had been used for wild-dumping. There also needed to clear up heavily over-grown vegetation and to find the old paths again. Opening day was on September 19 (Heritage Day) 2009. A thorough research allowed to identify the Motte Champlay fort, le railway tracks, sites of activity at the beginning of the 20th century and other interesting points.

=== Orienteering grounds ===
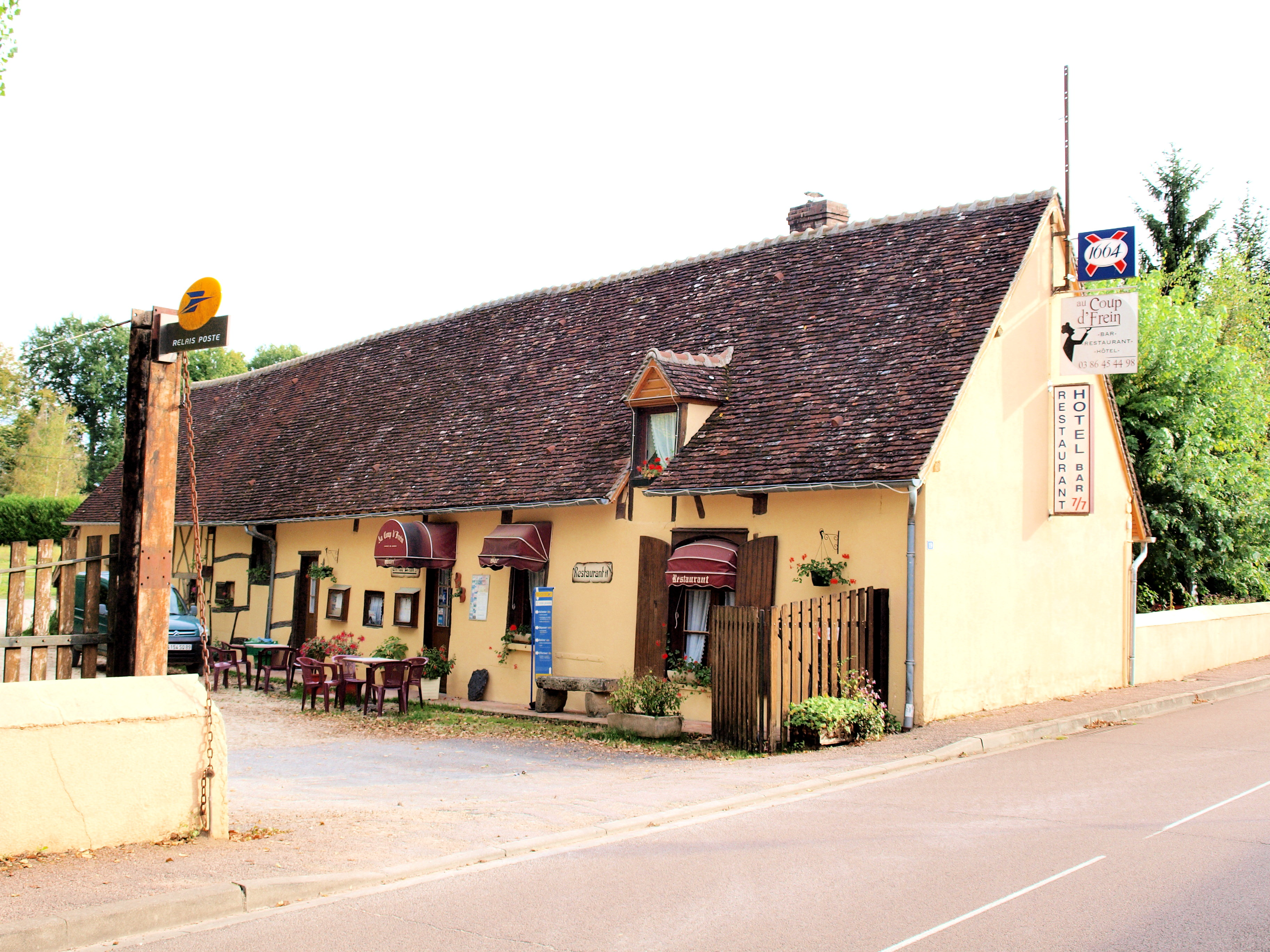
« Le Coup d'Frein » restaurant, official repository for orienteering kit

La communauté de communes a misé on the creation of orienteering courses, this being facilitated by that the wood is not a hunting ground: it can therefore be open to the public all year round. The comité de l’Yonne de course d’orientation (comity in the Yonne departement for the French Orienteering Federation) gave its expert advice on tracing the tracks and installing 25 control points and an information panel. The tracks can extend on nearby private land for one-off events, after obtaining permission from the owners.

The first two events in June 2011 and March 2012 were the final tests for the new courses before the National association for school sports (in French Union nationale du sport scolaire or UNSS) Academy championship on April 17, 2012, with 177 runners who expressed unanimous appreciation for the new courses and have helped strengthen the reputation of the grounds' installations. Access to the grounds is open and free all year-round. Orienteering maps, control description sheets, control cards and such are available at the restaurant « Le Coup d'Frein » in Tannerre, official repository.

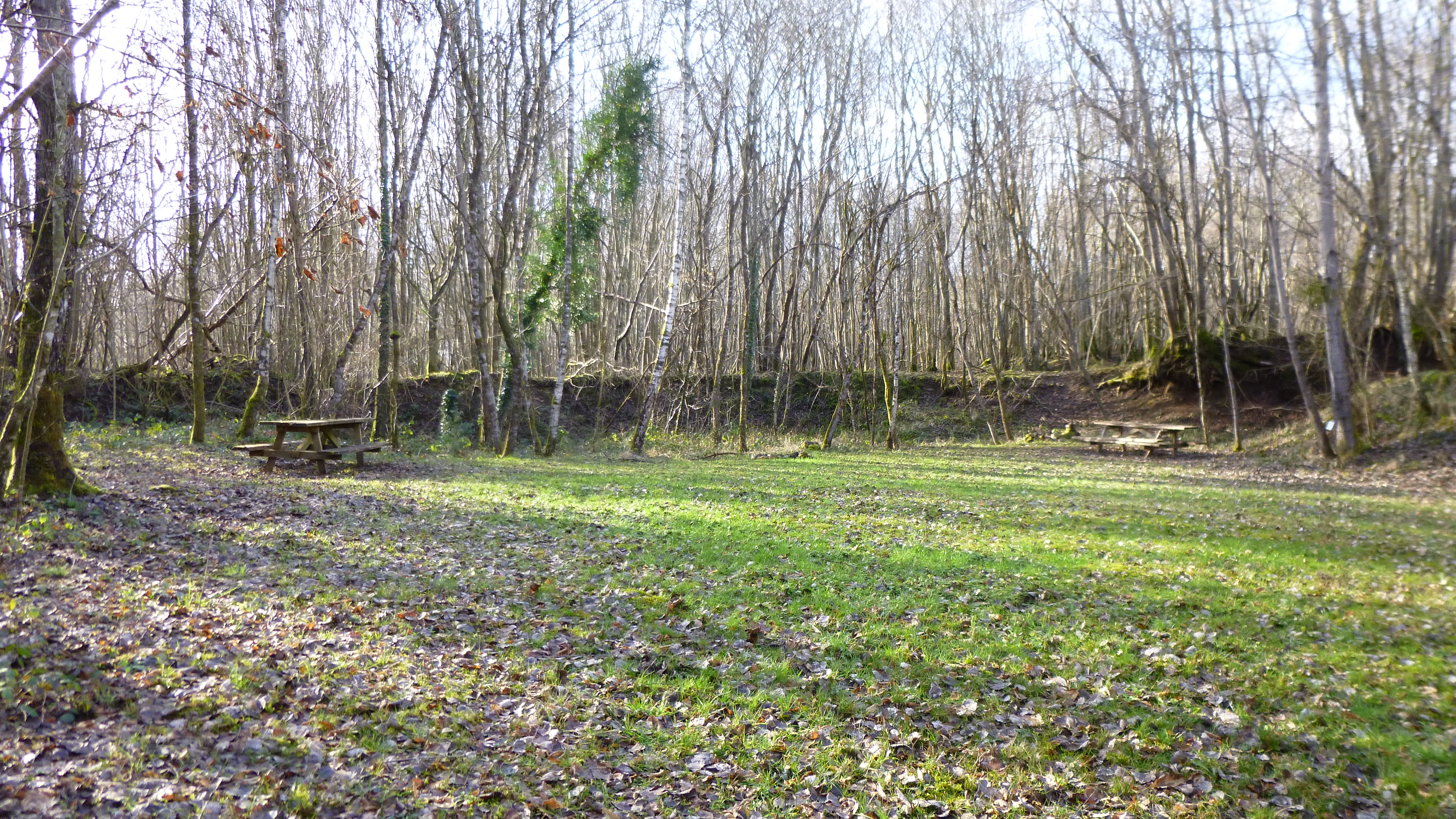
Site of Motte-Champlay with tables and benches

=== Welcoming visitors ===
Adding to this successful project and beyond maintaining the site, paths a.s.o., the ferrier association has created and installed equipments and information media : portals at site entrances with visitor information panels, panels on history or plants at significant points along the discovery paths... At the centre of the ferrier, the site of one of the towers that made up the Motte Champlay fort was set up as a rest area with benches and tables.

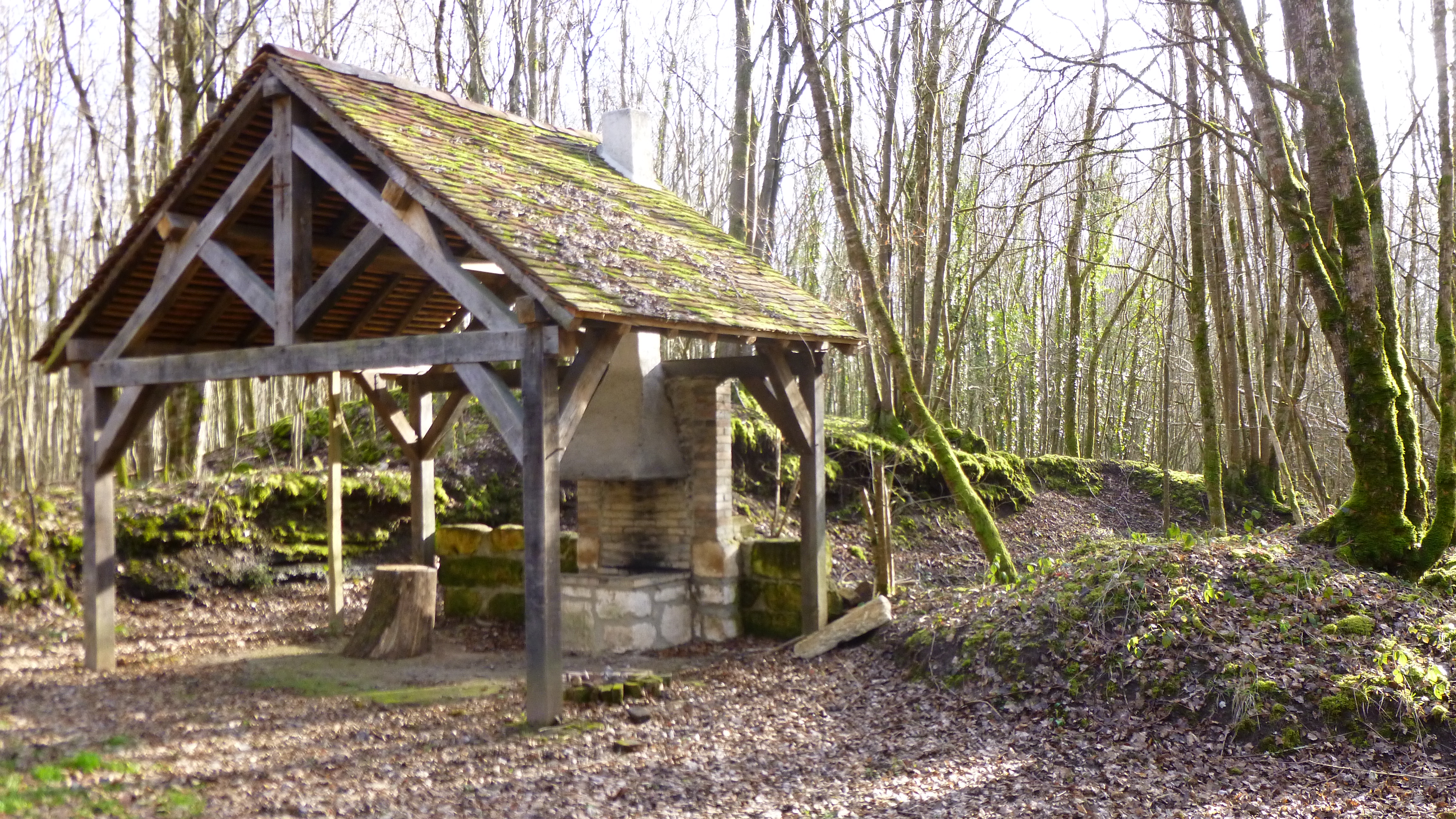
The new forge

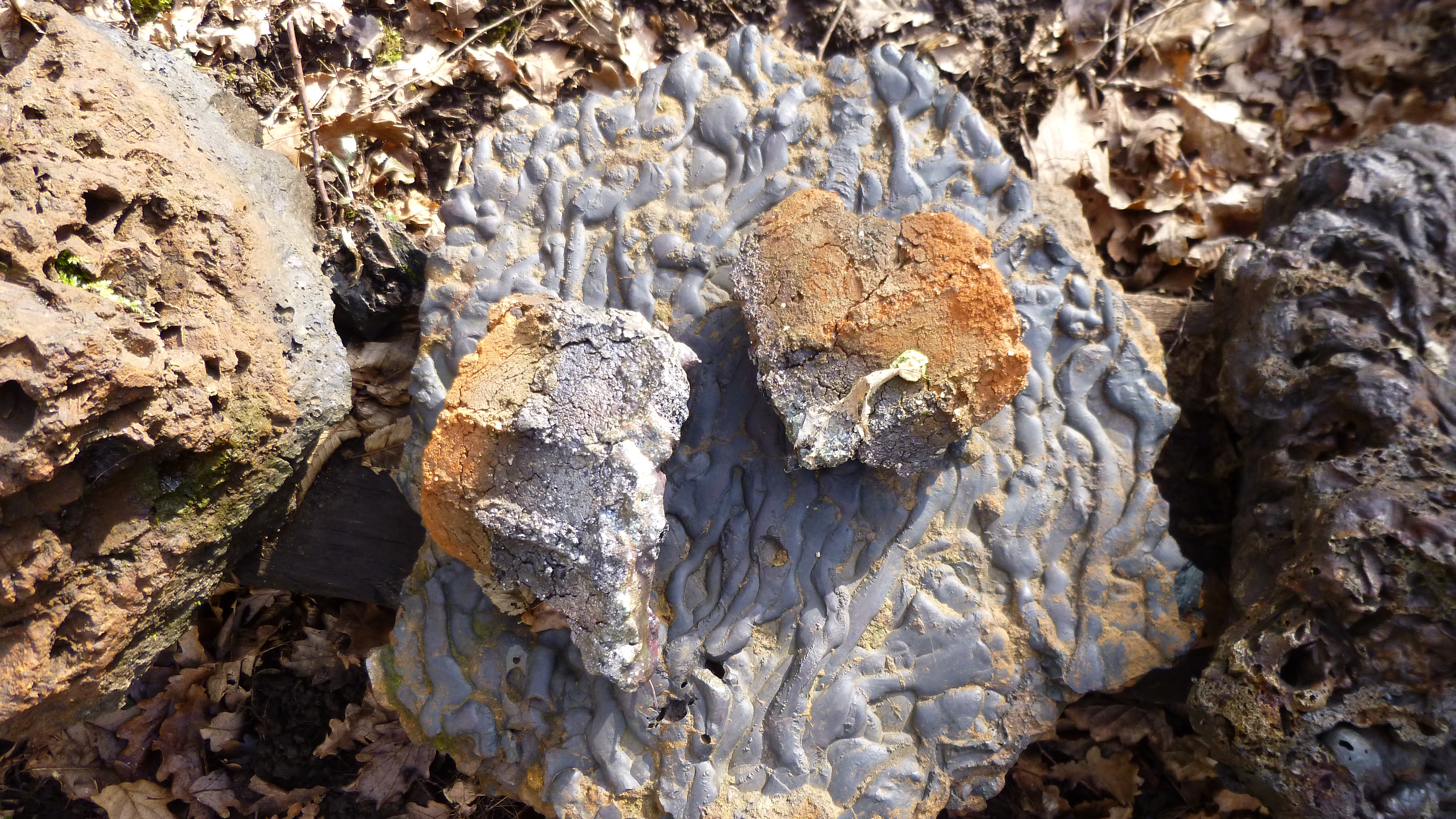
Block of slag produced on-site

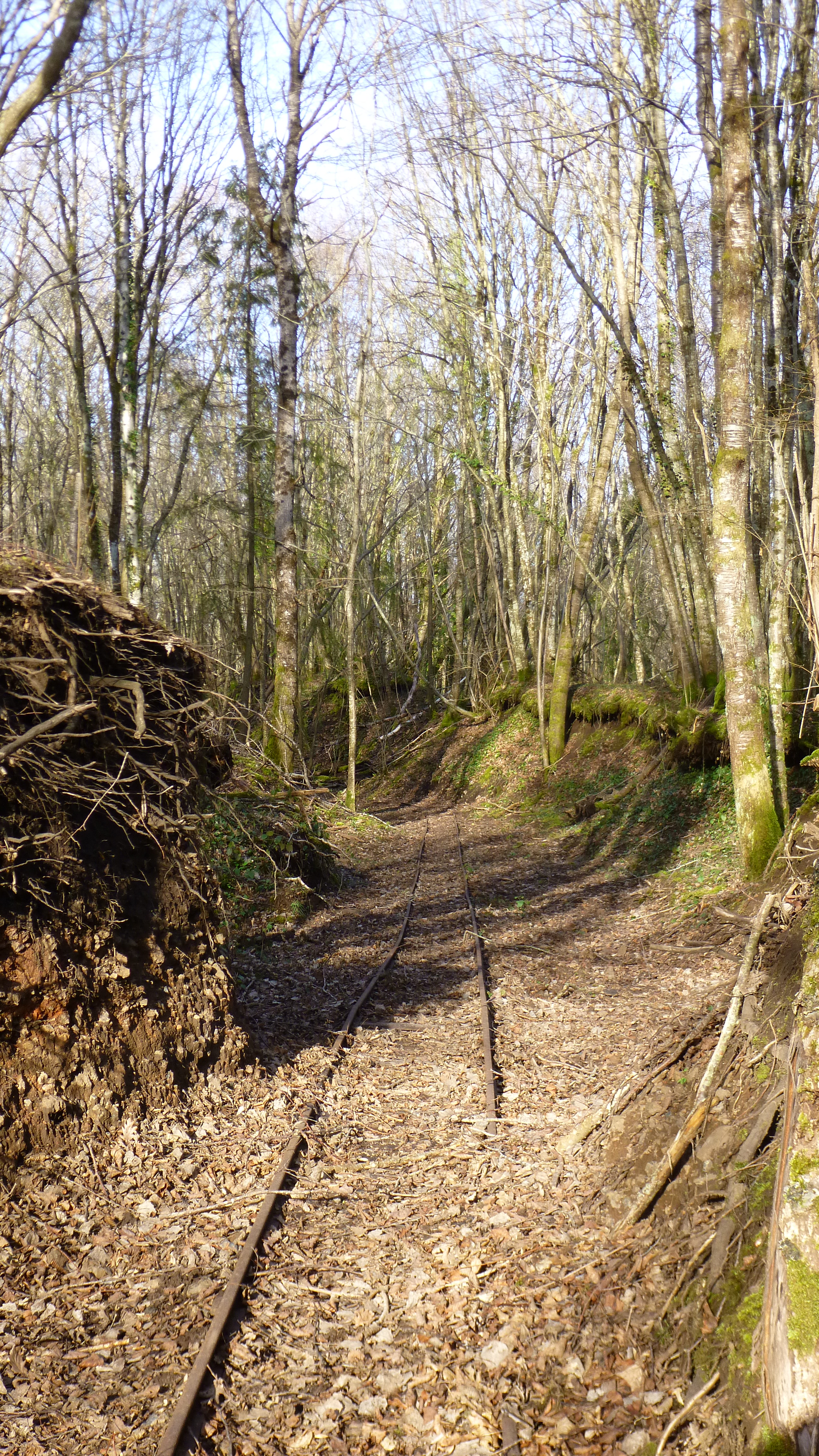
500mm narrow gauge track rebuilt identical to the original tracks

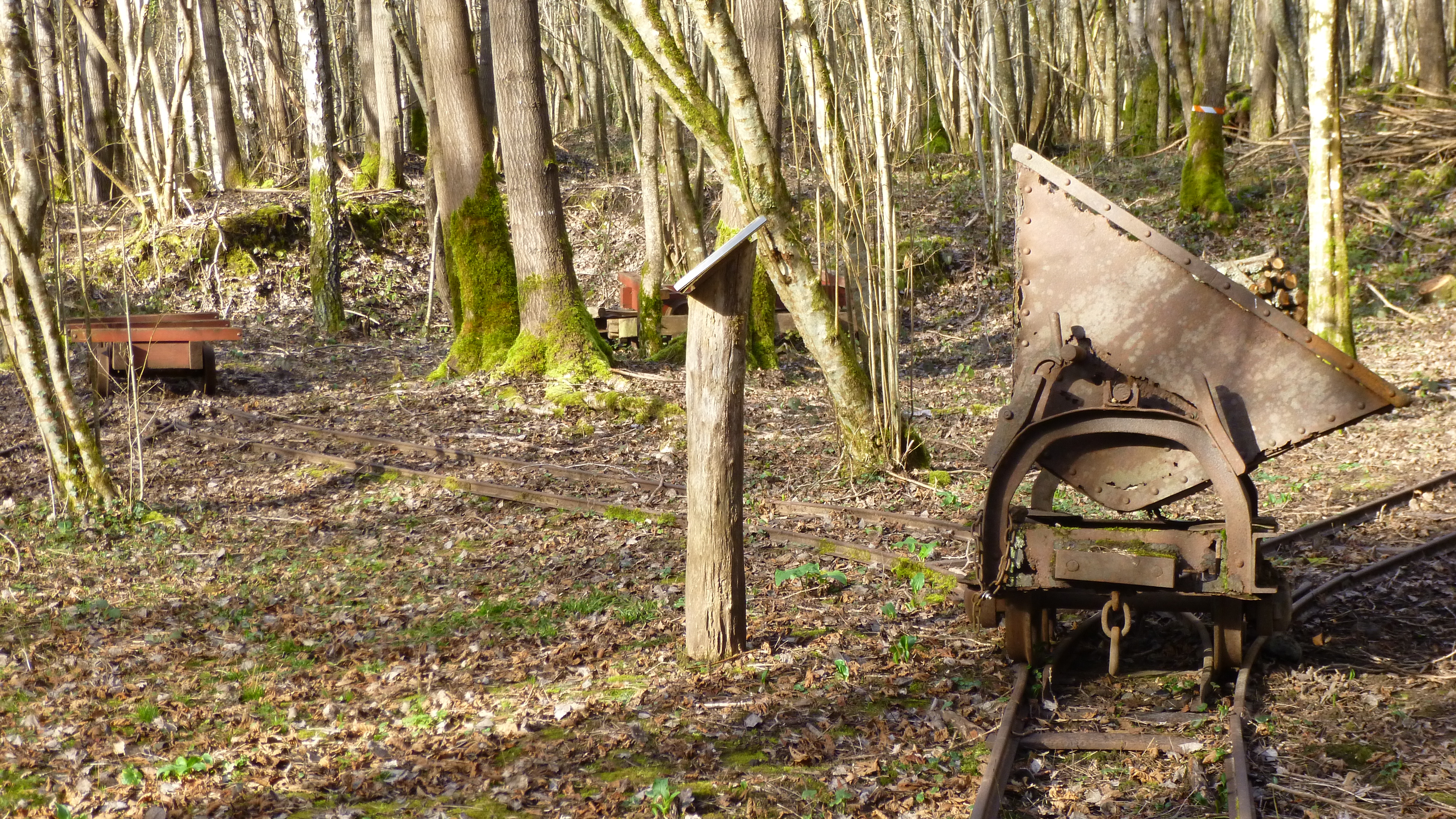
Original minecart shown with a draisine near a railroad switch

=== Historical highlights ===
Reminders of Antiquity and Middle Ages

The ferrier association has also re-created some workstations showing the successive stages of ore extraction and processing during Antiquity and during the last two centuries. Various tools have been made identical to those in that remote period, including bloomeries made in the ancient fashion and their adapted double bellows, a medieval forge and its large bellows copied from a 19th-century model. The bloomery requires frequent rebuildings as its lifespan covers only a few firings. It brings temperatures up 800 to 900 °C (1,470 to 1,650 °F).

A glimpse on 19th-20th century period

To represent modern times, the team has re-installed and relaunched part of the railway tracks that were in use from 1912 to 1931. It asked for help from the association "Le Petit Train de Champignelles", which provided needed documentation and support. This educative railway track takes up part of the path of the old 600 mm gauge railway track that linked the site to Villiers-Saint-Benoit, and of some of its 500 mm gauge track in the ferrier. In 2009, 40 m (130 ft) of 500 mm narrow gauge rail tracks were laid and a railroad switch was installed. In 2012, the 20th century worksite was linked to the heart of the ferrier with 50 m (160 ft) of 500 mm narrow gauge tracks; that installation revealed part of a clay tuyere and the bottom of a pot, coming from the oldest layers of the ferrier. The minecart used is an original (in 1931 minecarts were replaced by trucks). A slag-extraction workplace has also been recreated, showing a sieve rebuilt identical to an original model.

These efforts have brought to life a site that is representative of the ferrier exploitation during the 19th century, with discovery paths that link all the main history points.

=== Tours ===
Guided tours and demonstrations of direct iron reduction in bloomeries are organised yearly, usually during the ferrier feast beginning of September and the Heritage Days later in the same month.

The association wrote a booklet on the history of the site, available since end of 2013.

Some views from the discovery paths

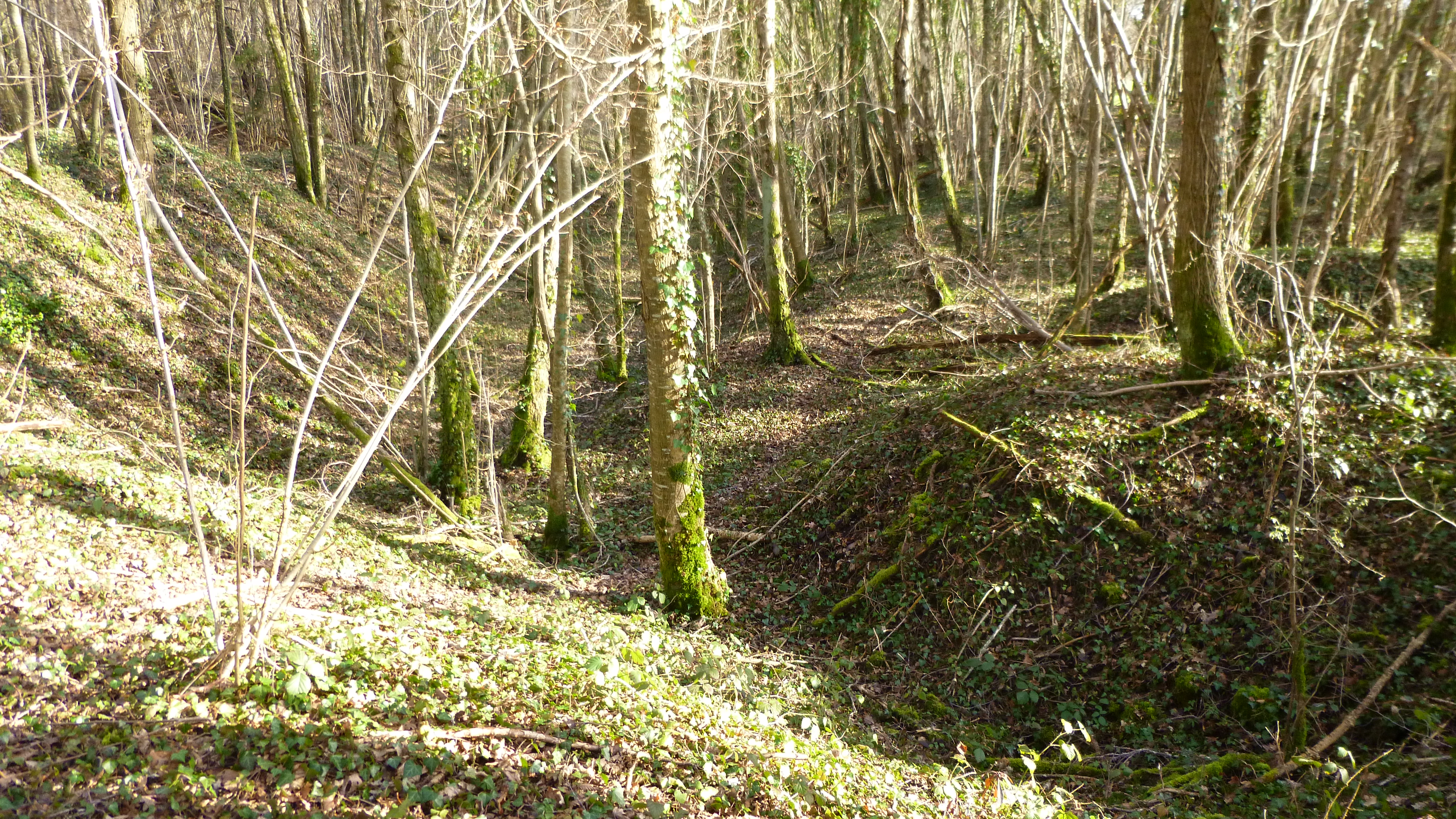
Trenches...

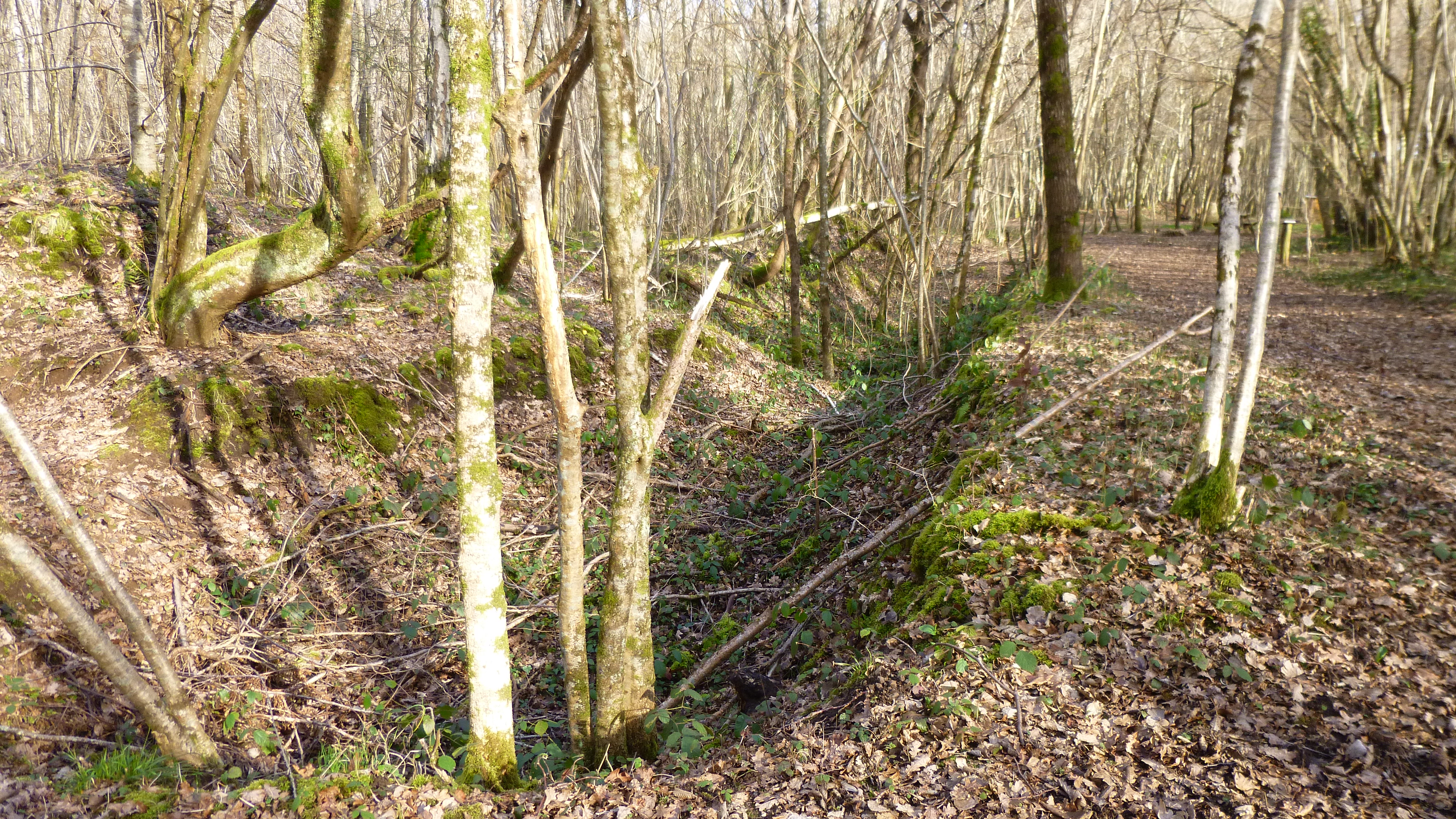
... among slag mounds

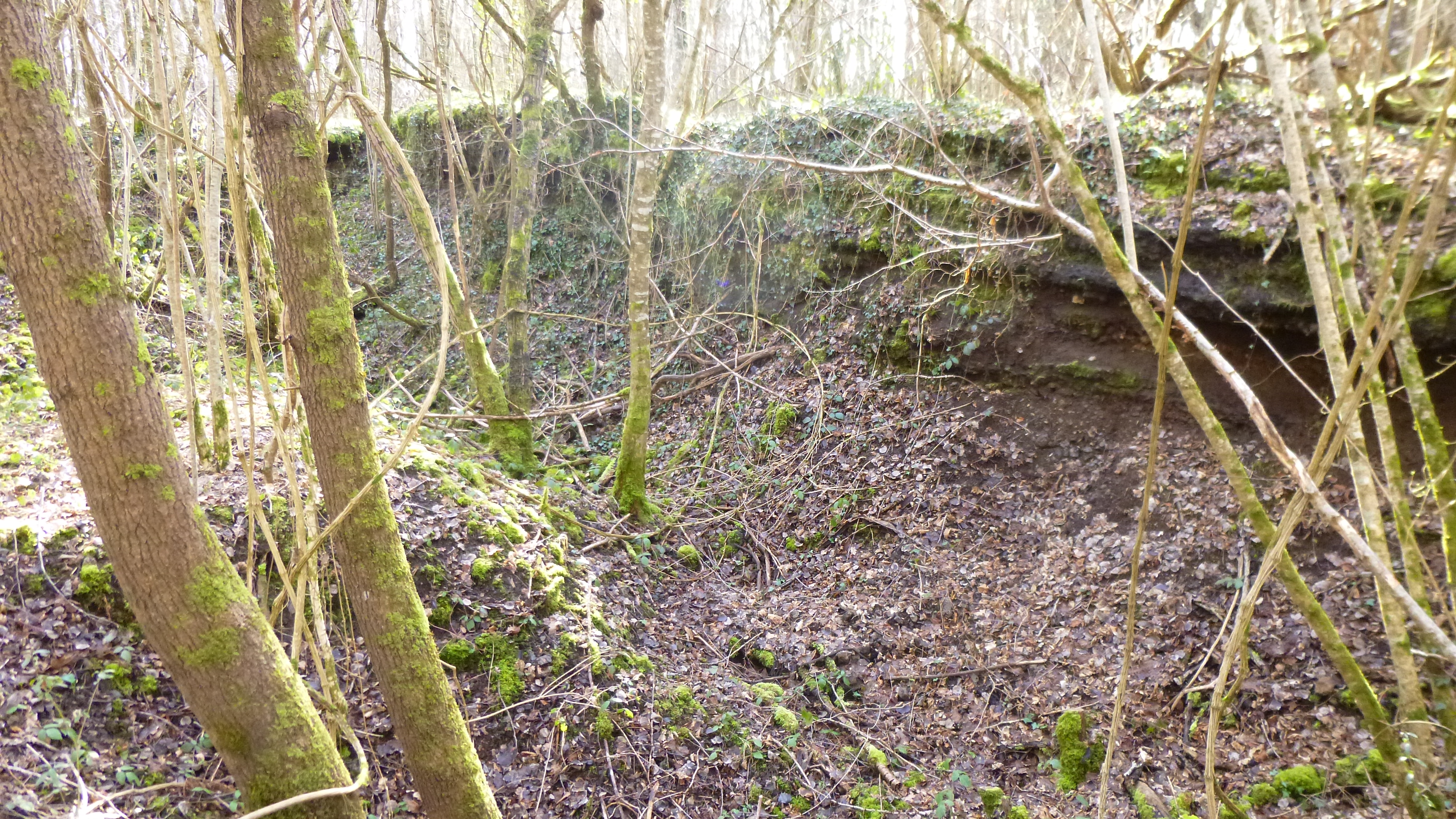
A truncated slag mound shows its layers

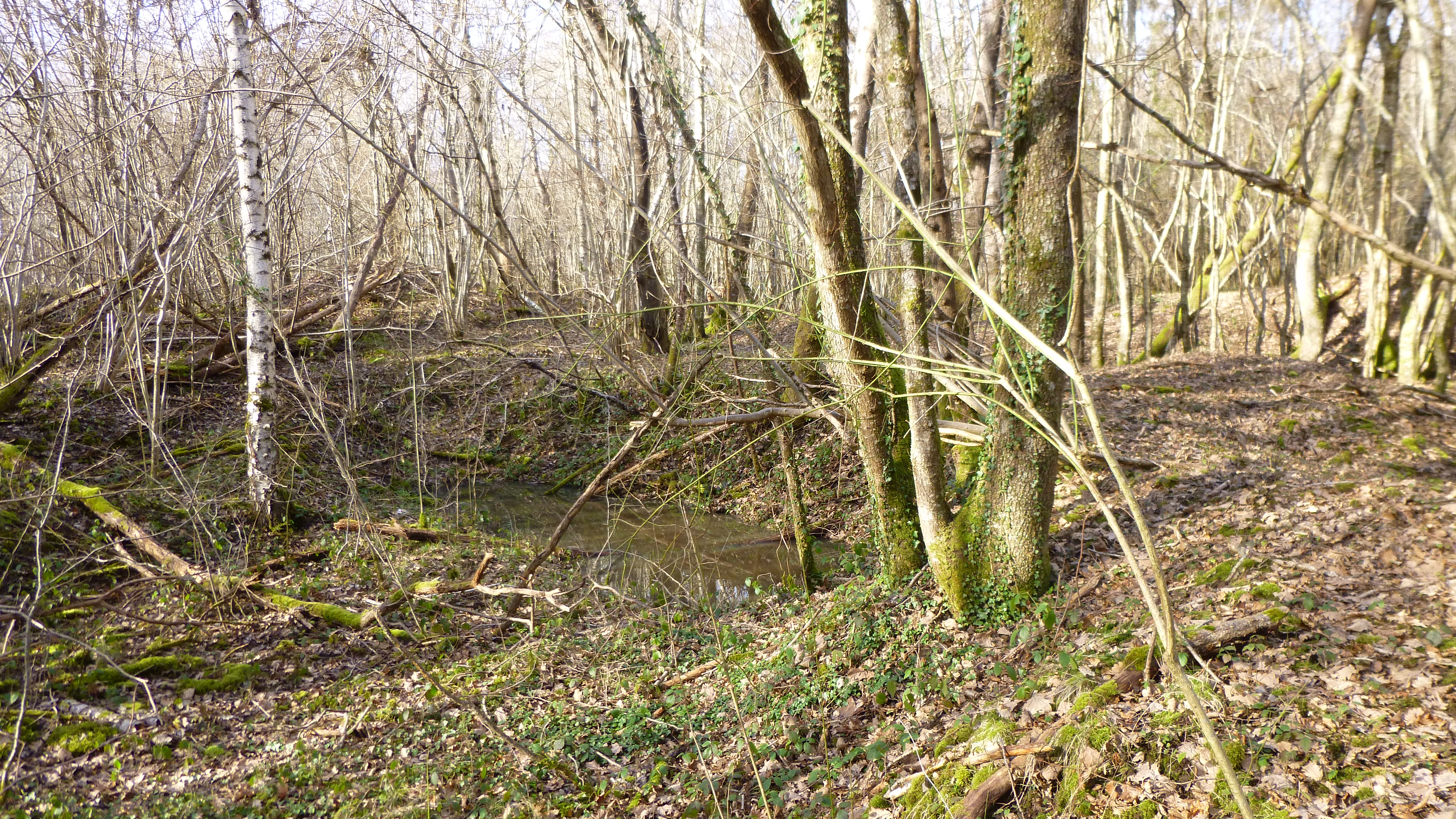
Mining hole filled with water

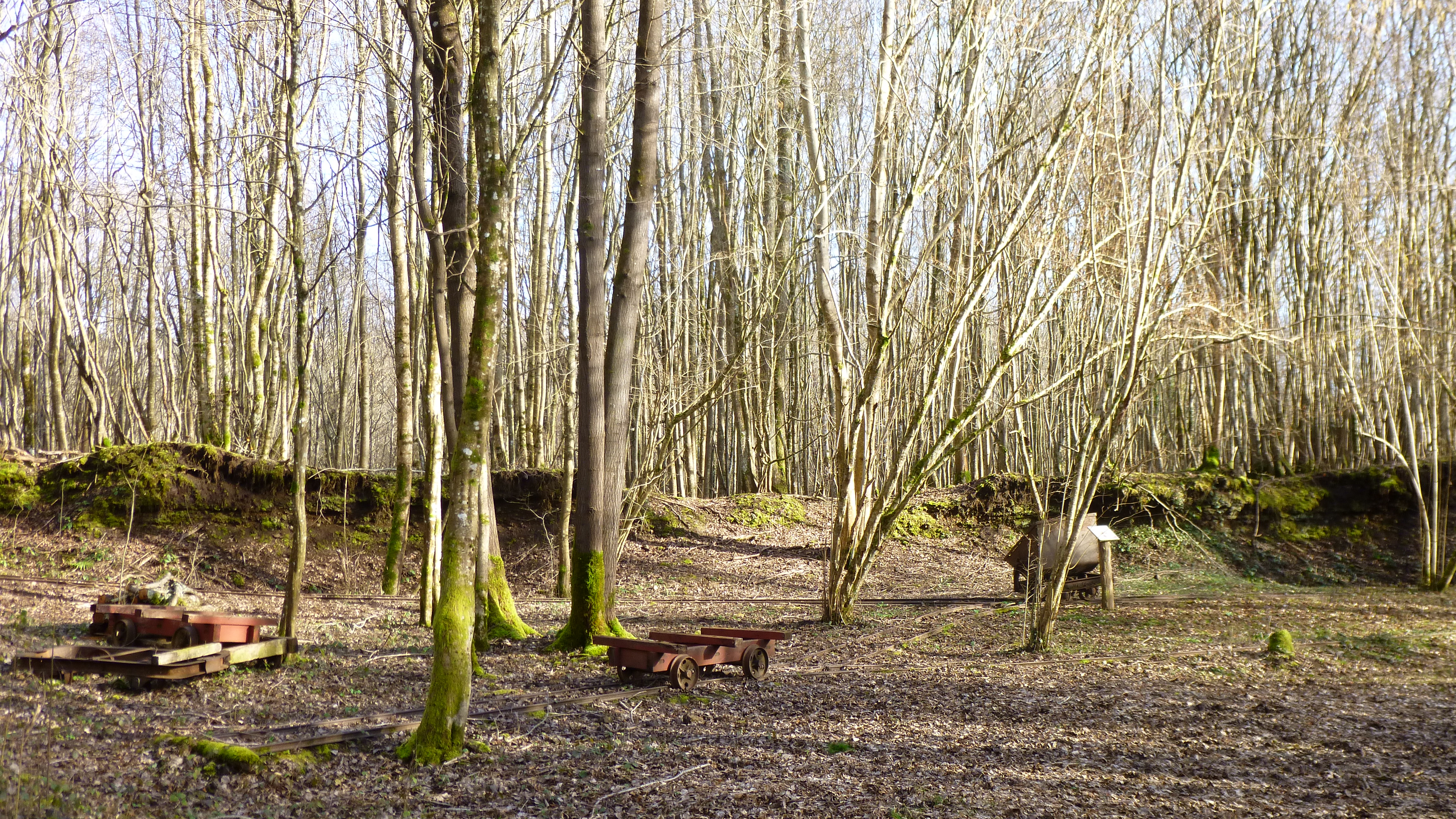
Minecart and draisine display, surrounded by truncated slag mounds showing their layers

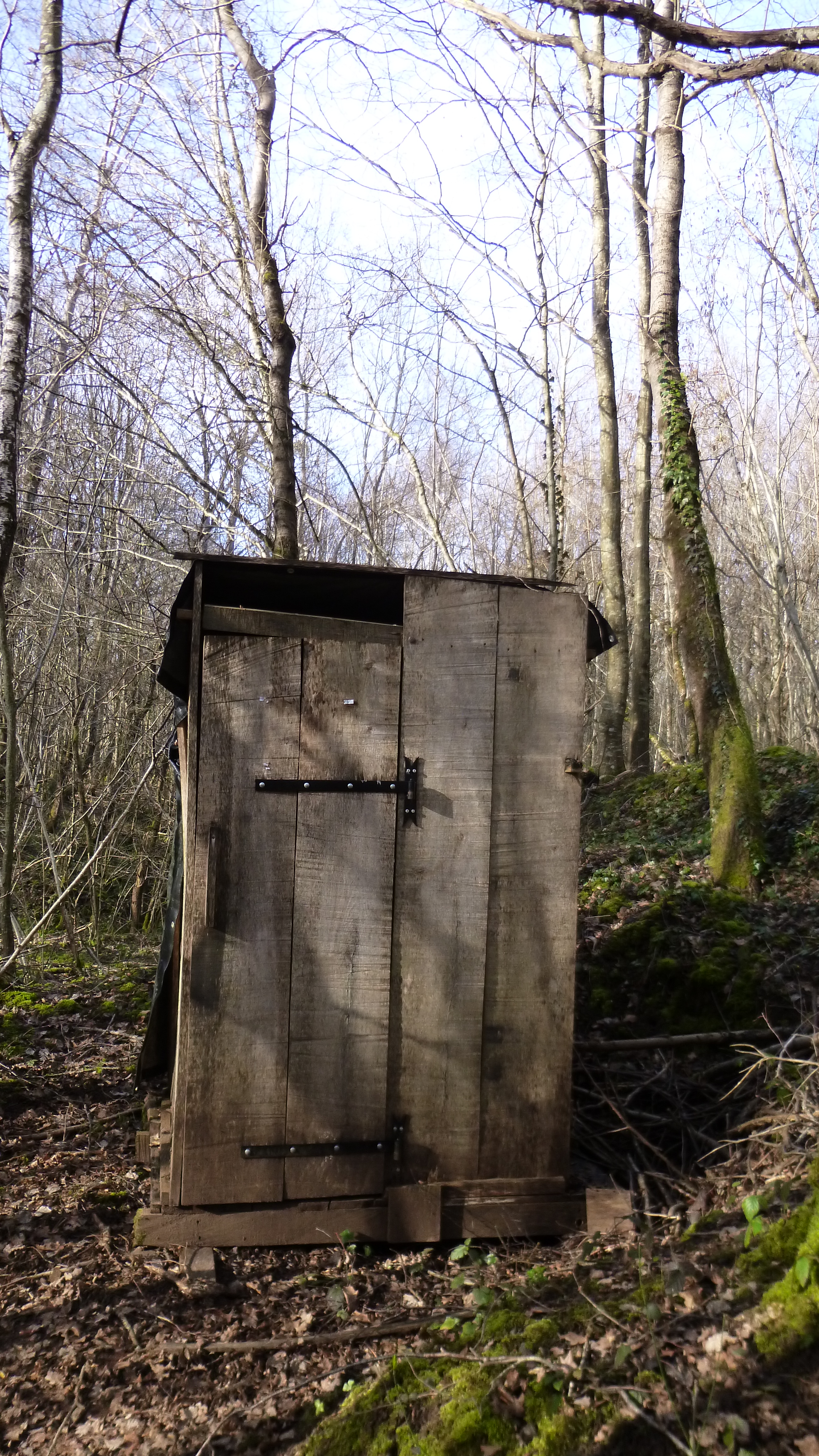
Dry toilet near the center of the ferrier

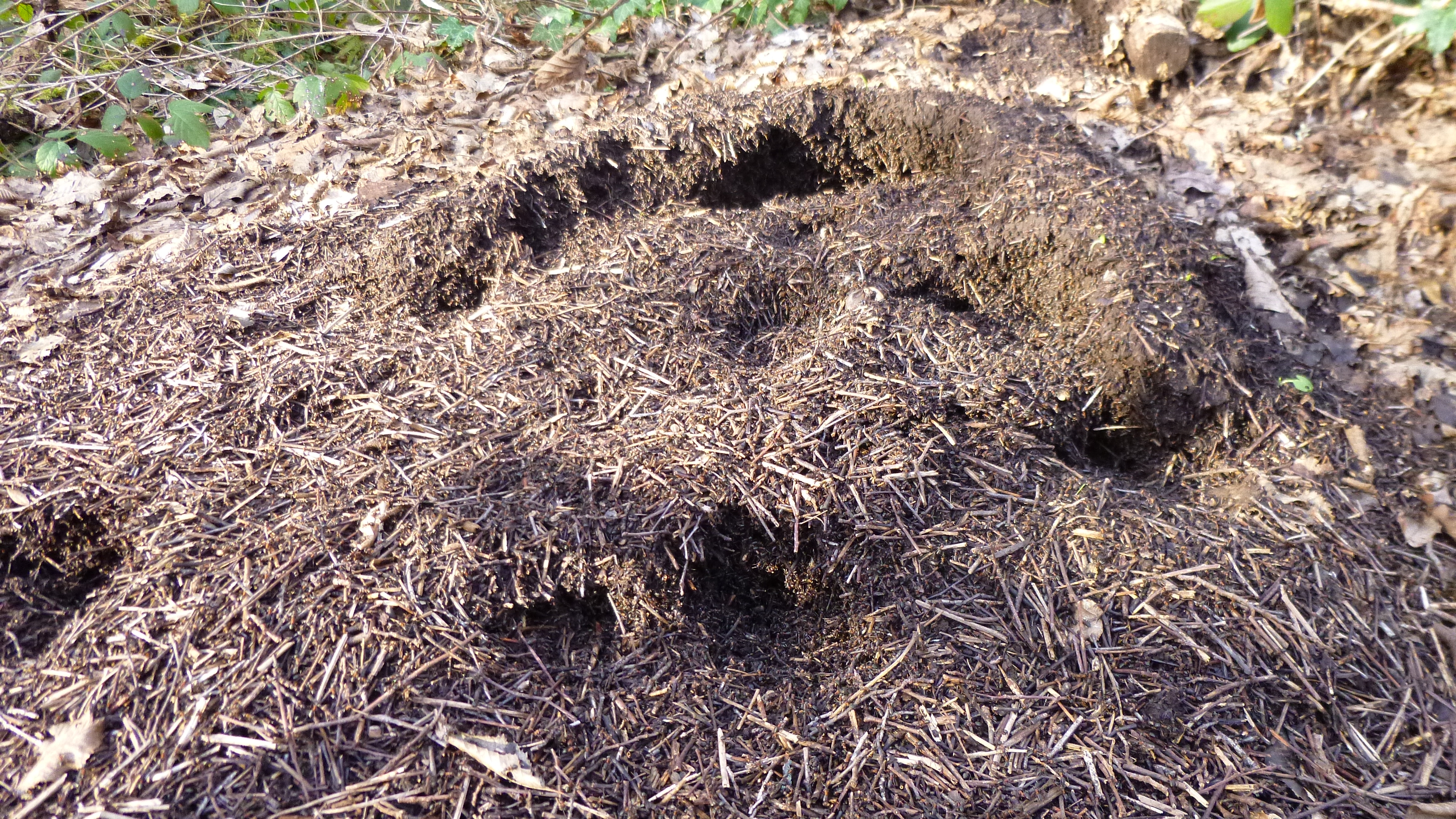
4 m^{2} (43 sq ft) wood ant nest along a path

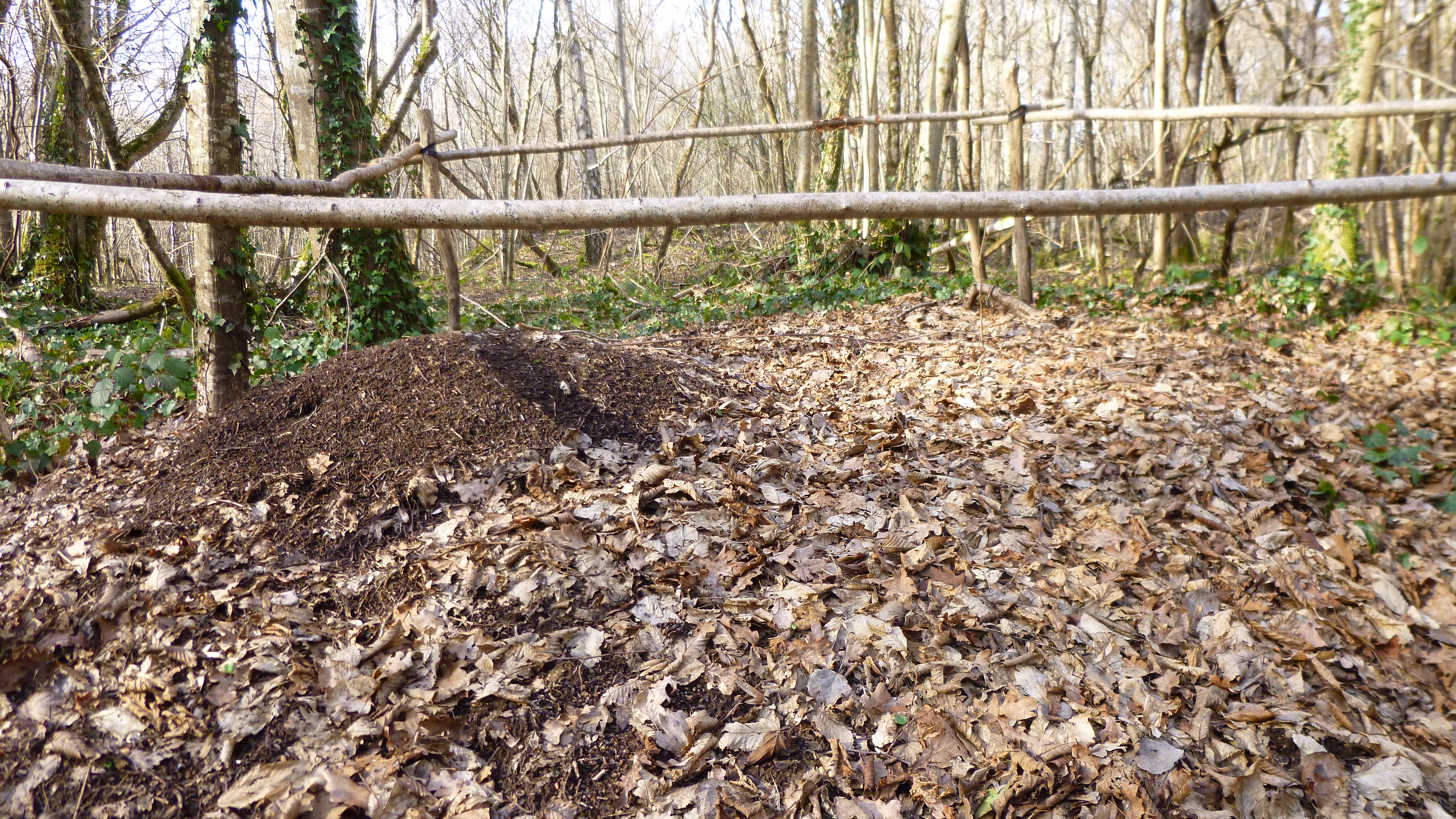
Another wood ant nest

== Notes and references ==
Notes

== See also ==
=== Related articles ===
- Iron ore
- Extraction of iron
- Ferrous metallurgy
- Bloomery
- Blast furnace
- Smelting
- Direct reduced iron
- Reduction (chemistry)
- Sponge iron reaction
- Spoil tip
- excavation (archaeology)
- Hull–Rust–Mahoning Open Pit Iron Mine
- Sherman Mine
- Glossary of rail transport terms
