= Tannerre-en-Puisaye =

- Commune
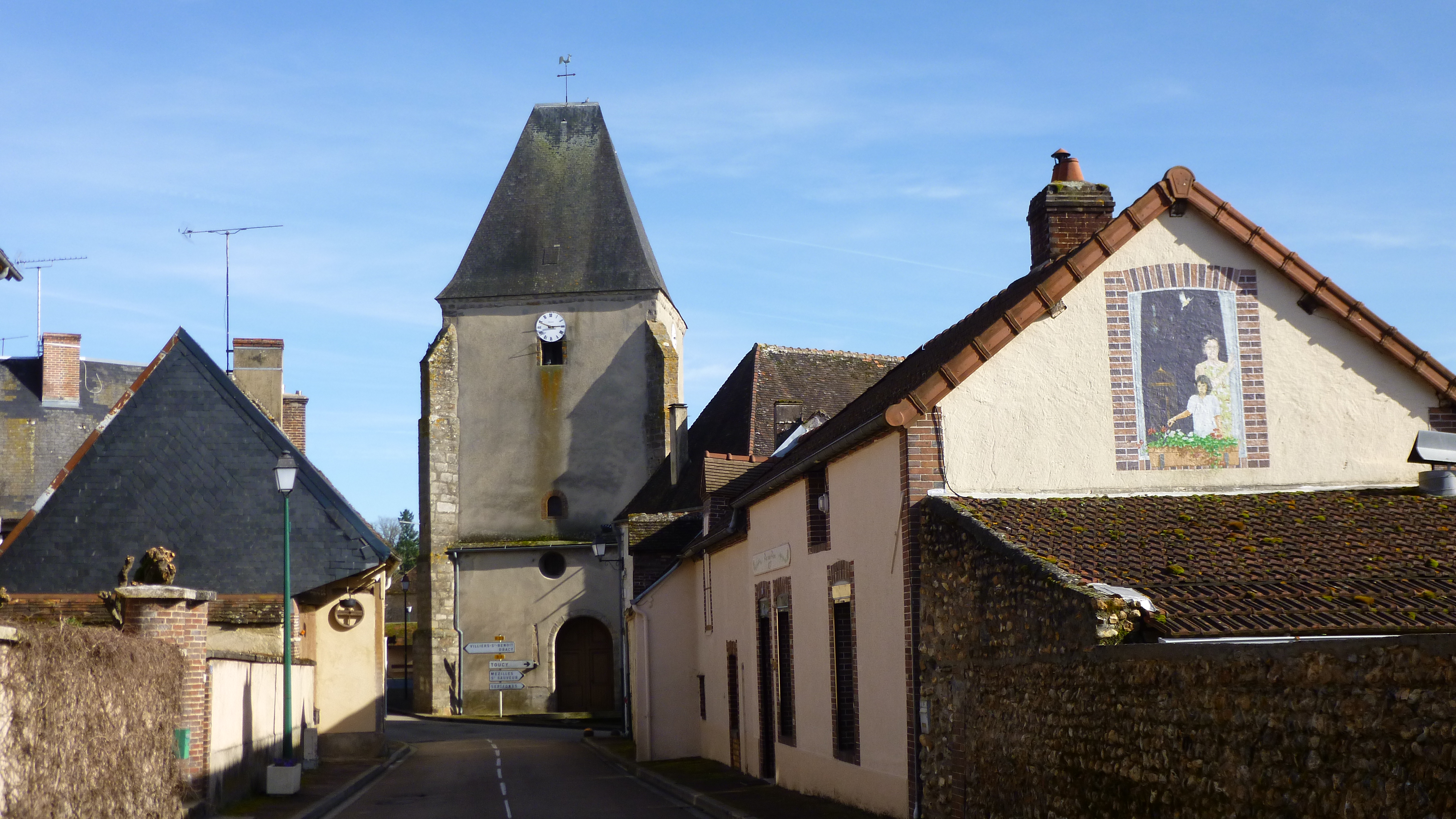
- Coming from Champignelles, the rue Carreau - Church and mural
- Location of Tannerre-en-Puisaye
- Location within France Location within Bourgogne-Franche-Comté
- Coordinates: 47°44′09″N 3°07′55″E
- Country: France
- Region: Bourgogne-Franche-Comté
- Department: Yonne
- Arrondissement: Auxerre
- Canton: Cœur de Puisaye

Government
  - Mayor (2020–2026): Claudine Pesant
- Area^{1}: 28.93 km^{2} (11.17 sq mi)
- Highest elevation: 242 m (794 ft)
- Lowest elevation: 168 m (551 ft)
- Population (2023): 269
  - Density: 9.30/km^{2} (24.1/sq mi)
- Time zone: UTC+01:00 (CET)
  - Summer (DST): UTC+02:00 (CEST)
- INSEE/Postal code: 89408 /89350
- ^{1} French Land Register data, which excludes lakes, ponds, glaciers > 1 km^{2} (0.386 sq mi or 247 acres) and river estuaries.

Tannerre-en-Puisaye (French pronunciation: [tanɛʁ ɑ̃ pɥizɛ]) is a commune in the Yonne department, in Bourgogne-Franche-Comté, in north-central France, in the historical region of Puisaye.

It is famous for its antique ferrier, one of the two largest in France with 31 hectares (77 acres) covered. It has been a listed Heritage Monument since 1982.

A ferrier is a mound, hillock or hill made with residues from the extraction and smelting of iron ore.

== Geography ==
Tannerre is crossed by the Branlin river, a tributary of the Ouanne river.

== History ==
Tannerre's ferrier was started during the Iron Age, but 80% of its bulk was made during the 300 years of Roman occupation. A Celtic village, which then became Gallo-Roman, was set half-way up the hill on which the ferrier grew.

After the Romans left, the mining activity in the area steadily declined to almost entirely disappear towards the 10th century. By then, the village had moved down near the river, where it still lays.

During the 10th century, a fort called "Motte-Champlay" was built on a leveled surface above the piles of slag. It was destroyed by English captain Robert Knolles in 1360, along with the village and its other fort in the valley.

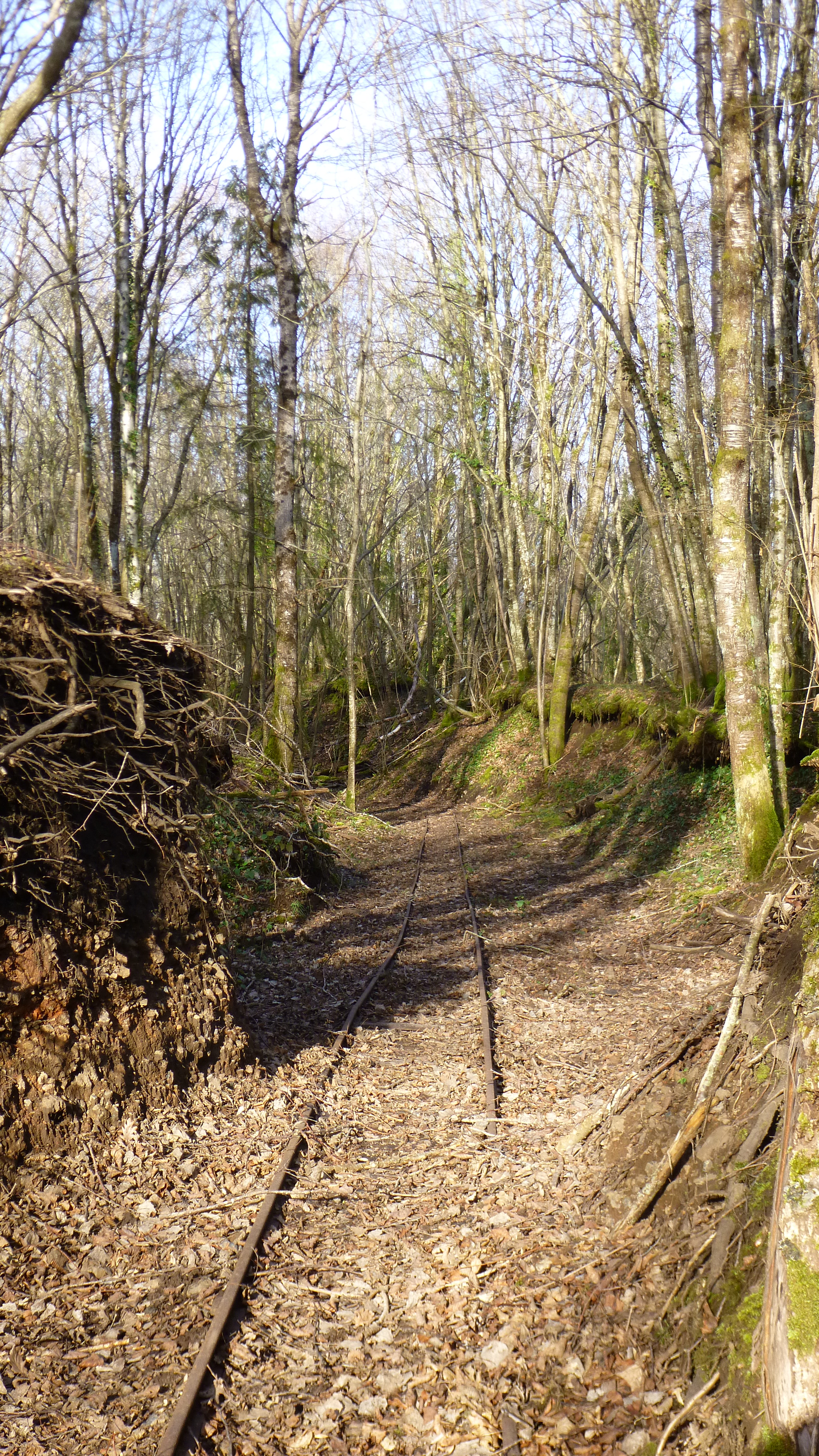
The railway leading to the outgoing loading area

The ferrier's slag had long been used in a small way to repair roads and pathways. Towards the end of the 19th century, industrial methods began to be applied. To that purpose, a whole railway network was built in the ferrier at the beginning of the 20th century, using a 500 mm narrow gauge within the ferrier and a 600 mm gauge for the out-going tracks, complete with switches, turntables, derailers, workshop and well. It enabled the approach and operation of all workstations.

The slag, still richer in iron than the common ore in Lorraine, was sent to the blast furnaces that were a trademark of that eastern part of France at that time. Not only it enriched their iron content; it also contained silica, a natural flux that helped the reduction reaction necessary to extract the iron from its ore, and was said the "cure" the blast furnaces.

== Present day ==
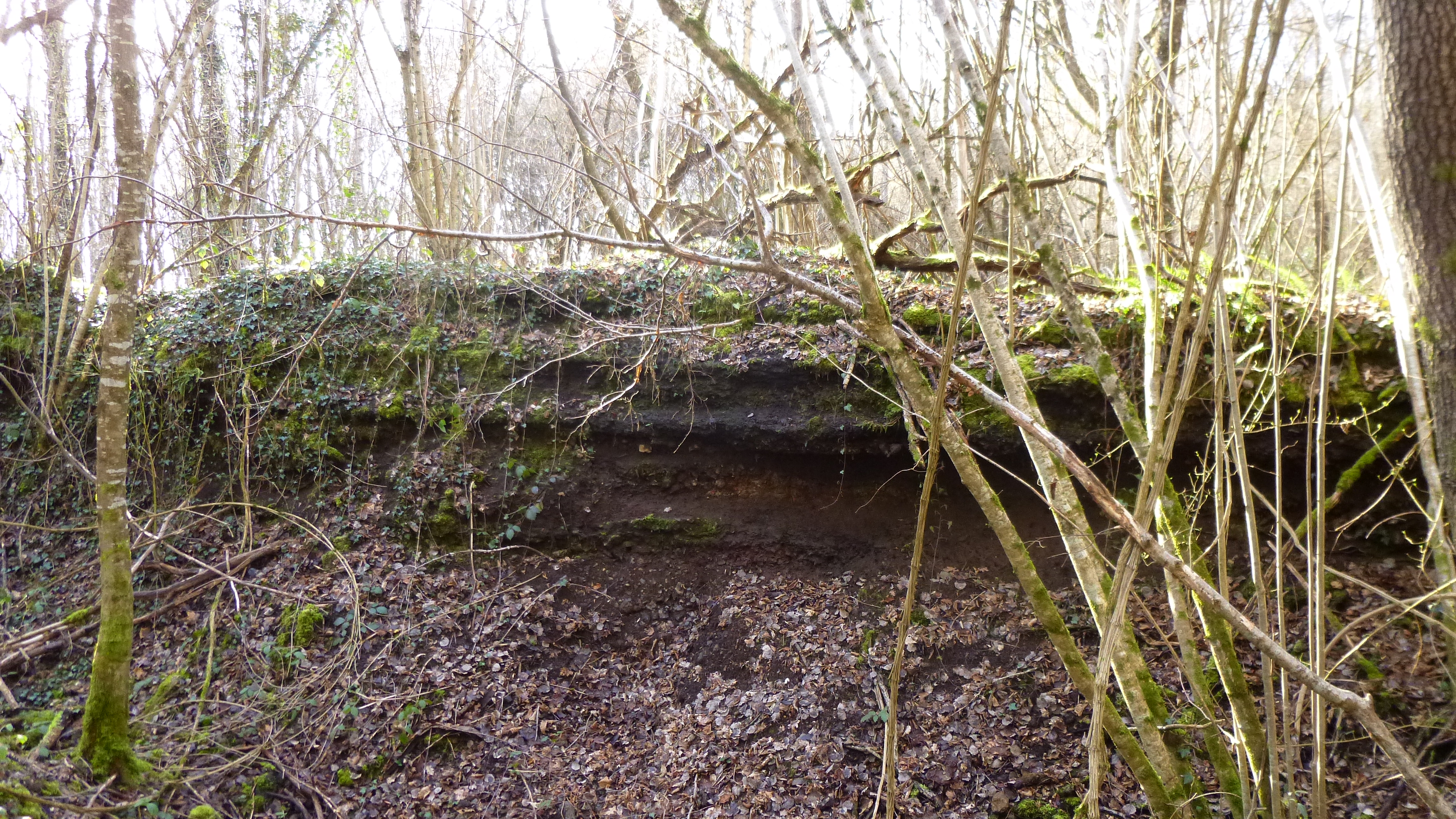
Slag mound showing its strata

The ferrier's industrial exploitation ceased in 1982, when it became a Heritage site. During the following 25 years it became overgrown and was occasionally used as a dump.

An association was created in 2008, "Le ferrier de Tannerre". After cleaning up the grounds, retracing paths in the wood, building dry toilets a.s.o., they have built a forge, recreated a bloomery furnace (in fact several, as bloomeries' lifespan does not exceed 3 or 4 loads) and double bellows for it, and restored large bellows for the forge. They also found a vintage quarry tub and draisine, now on display in the ferrier, and have recreated some of the old railway network to illustrate the ferrier's 20th century industrial period.

The association also holds a yearly ferrier party in September, with demonstrations of the working bloomery; visitors can try their hand at the forge and at pottery, there are children games, a free guided tour, and a meal composed with old recipes and roasted boar.

== Orienteering ==
The association "Le ferrier de Tannerre" has also enlisted the help of regional sports authorities and initiated the creation of a fully-fledged orienteering triple course (3 levels of difficulty), with 25 permanent control points and the corresponding 3 orienteering maps. There is also a presentation panel at the main entrance of the ferrier. National events have already been held there.

== Gallery ==
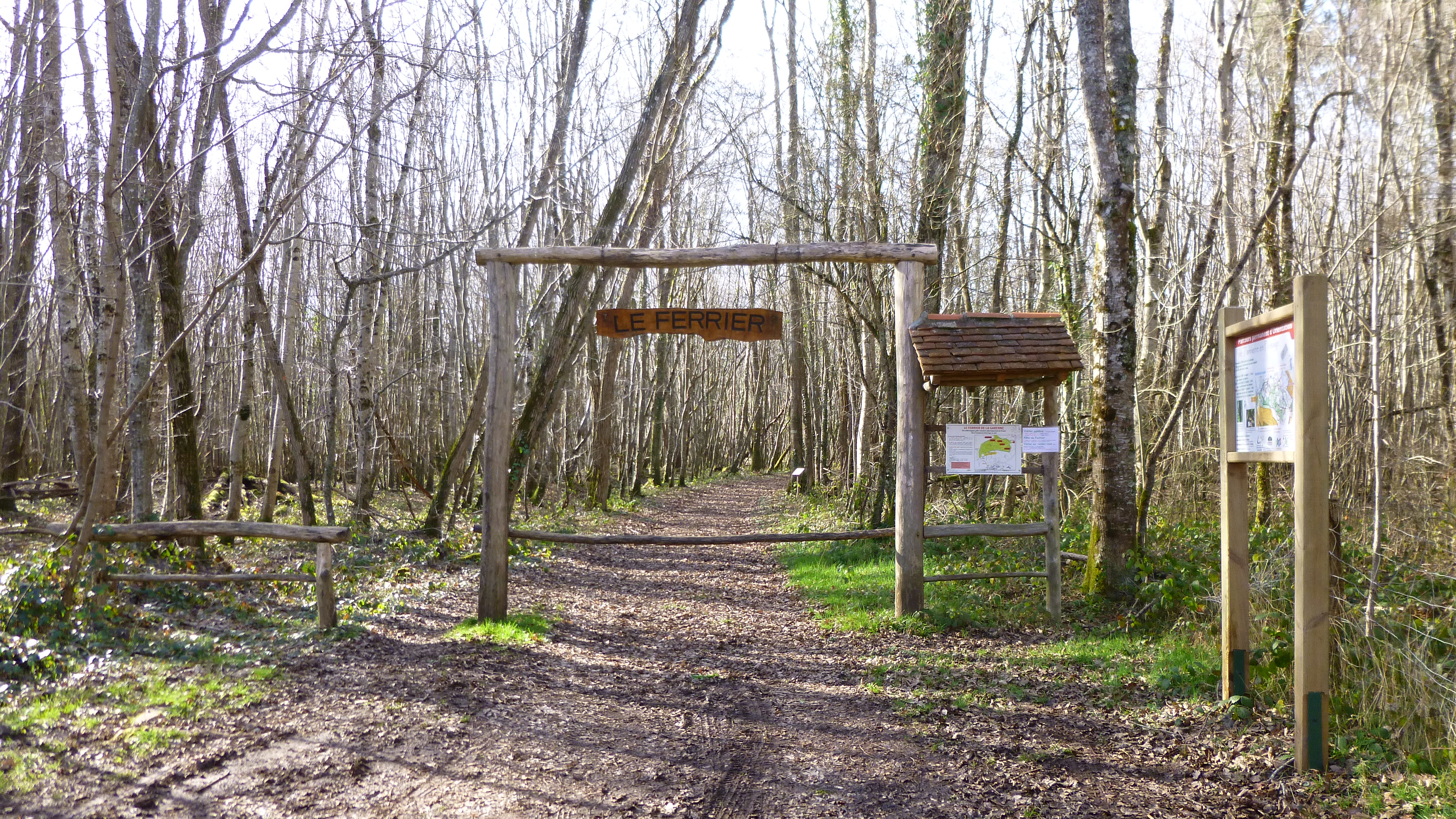
The ferrier - Entrance by the route des Mussots

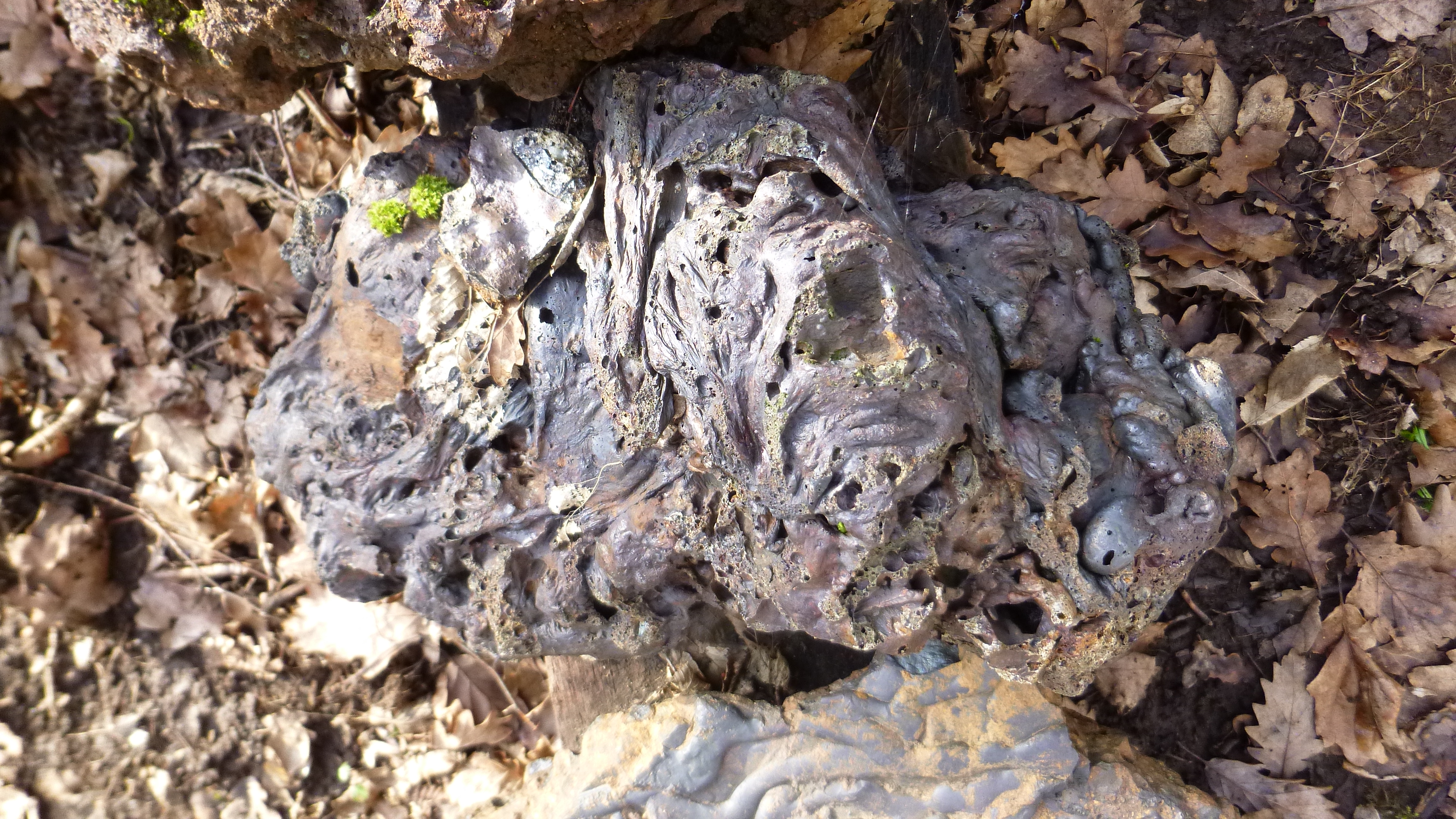
Slag produced on site

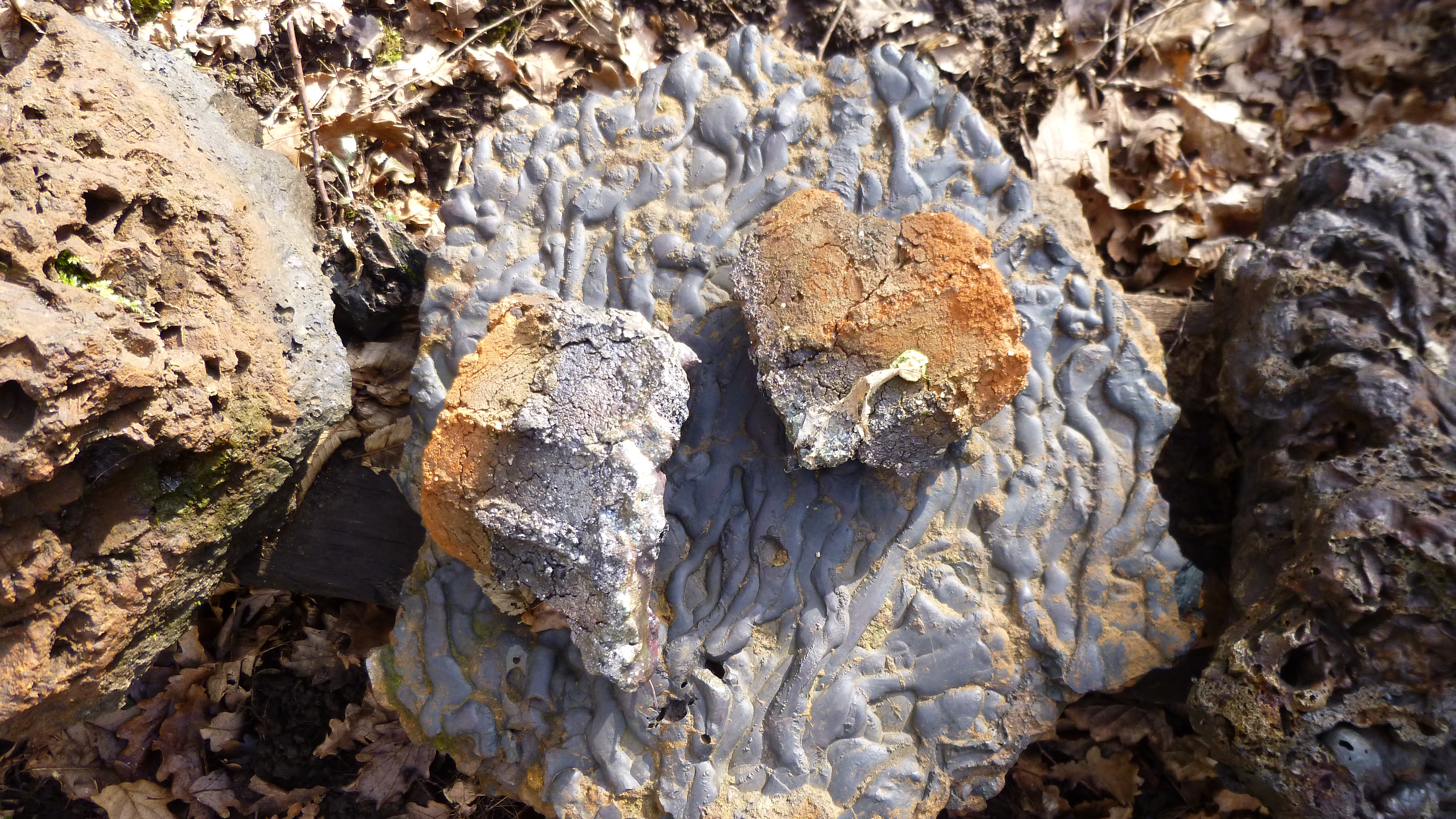
Slag produced on site

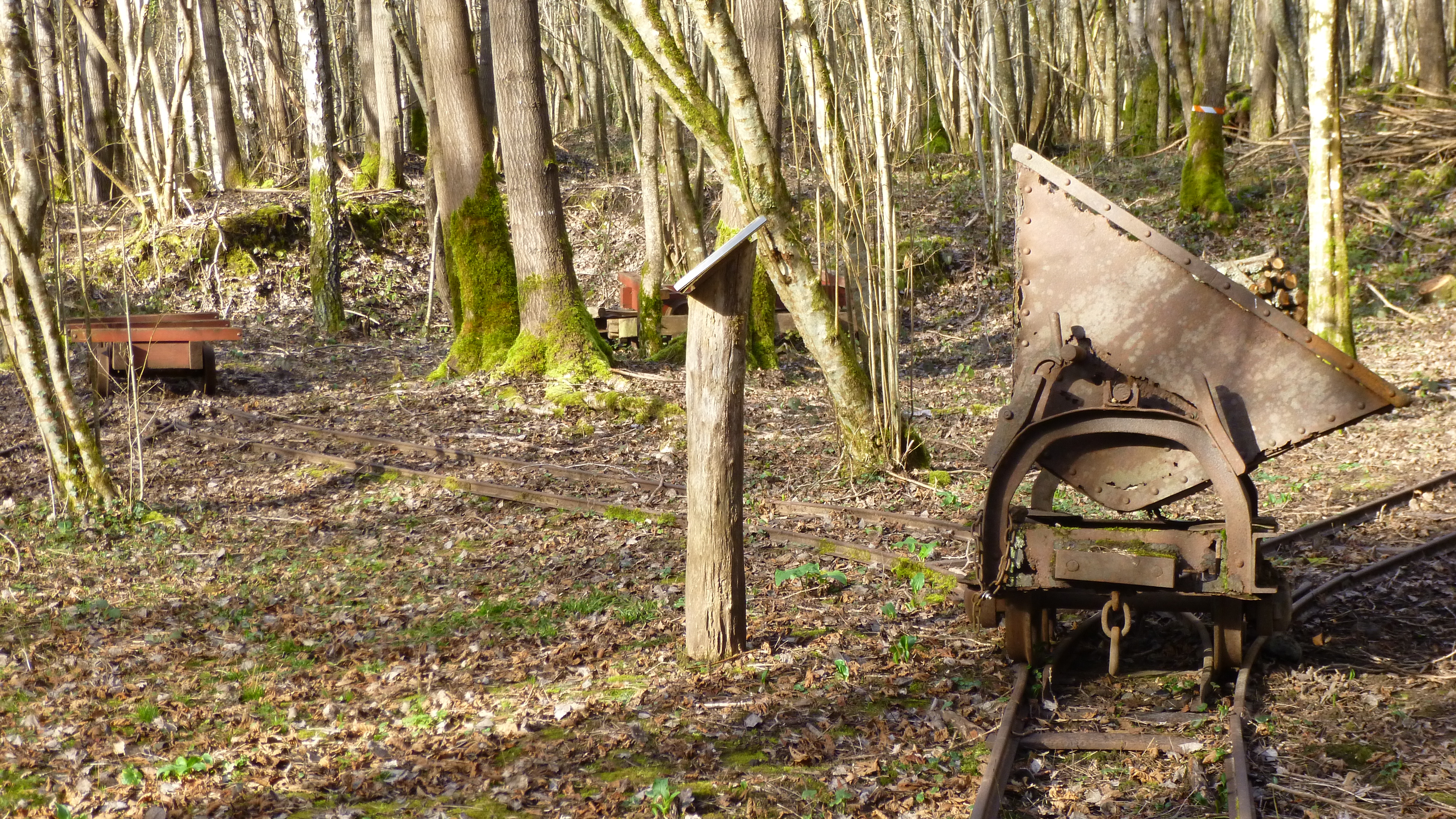
Vintage quarry tub and draisine on display on rails

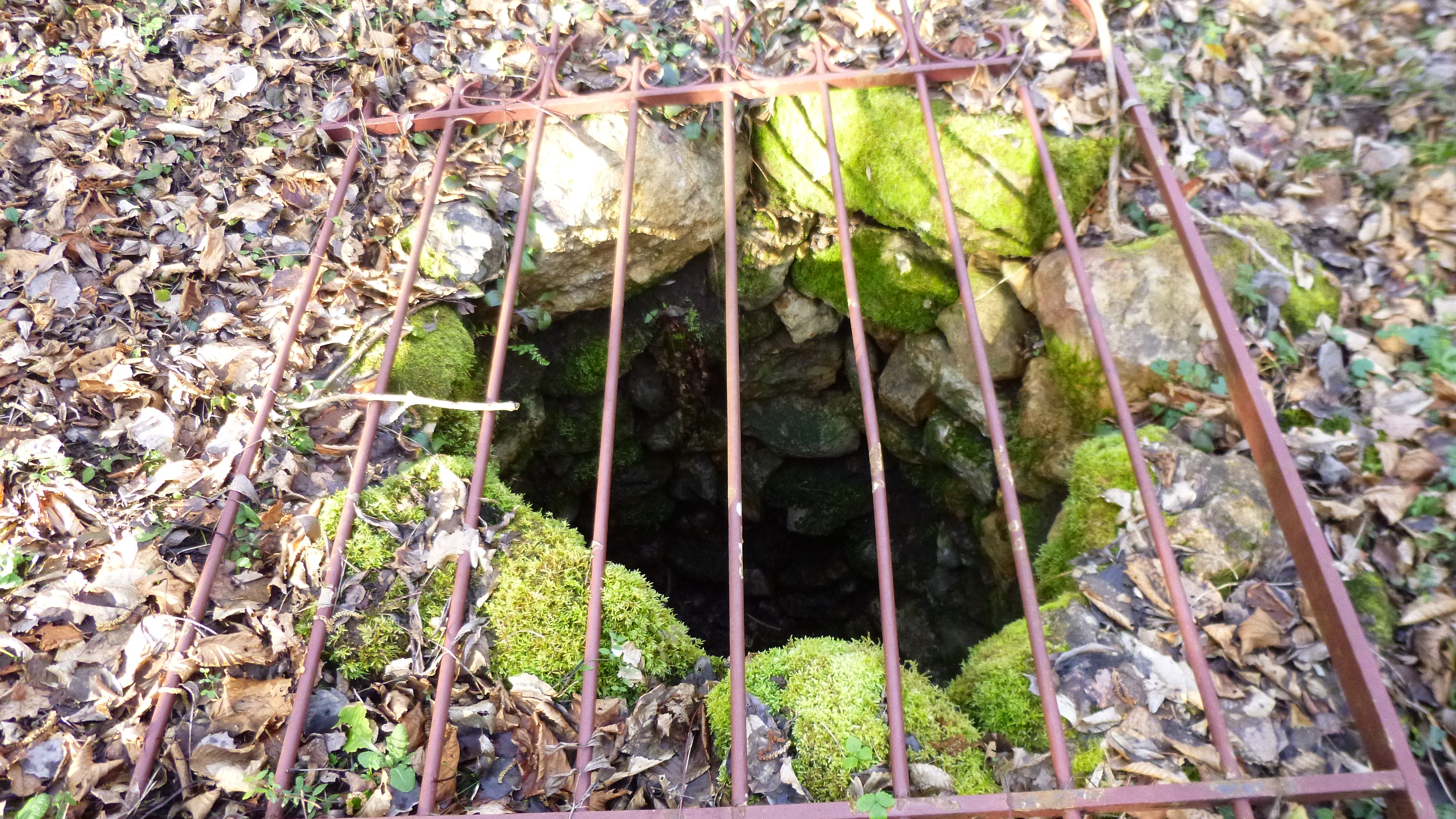
Roman water well in the ferrier

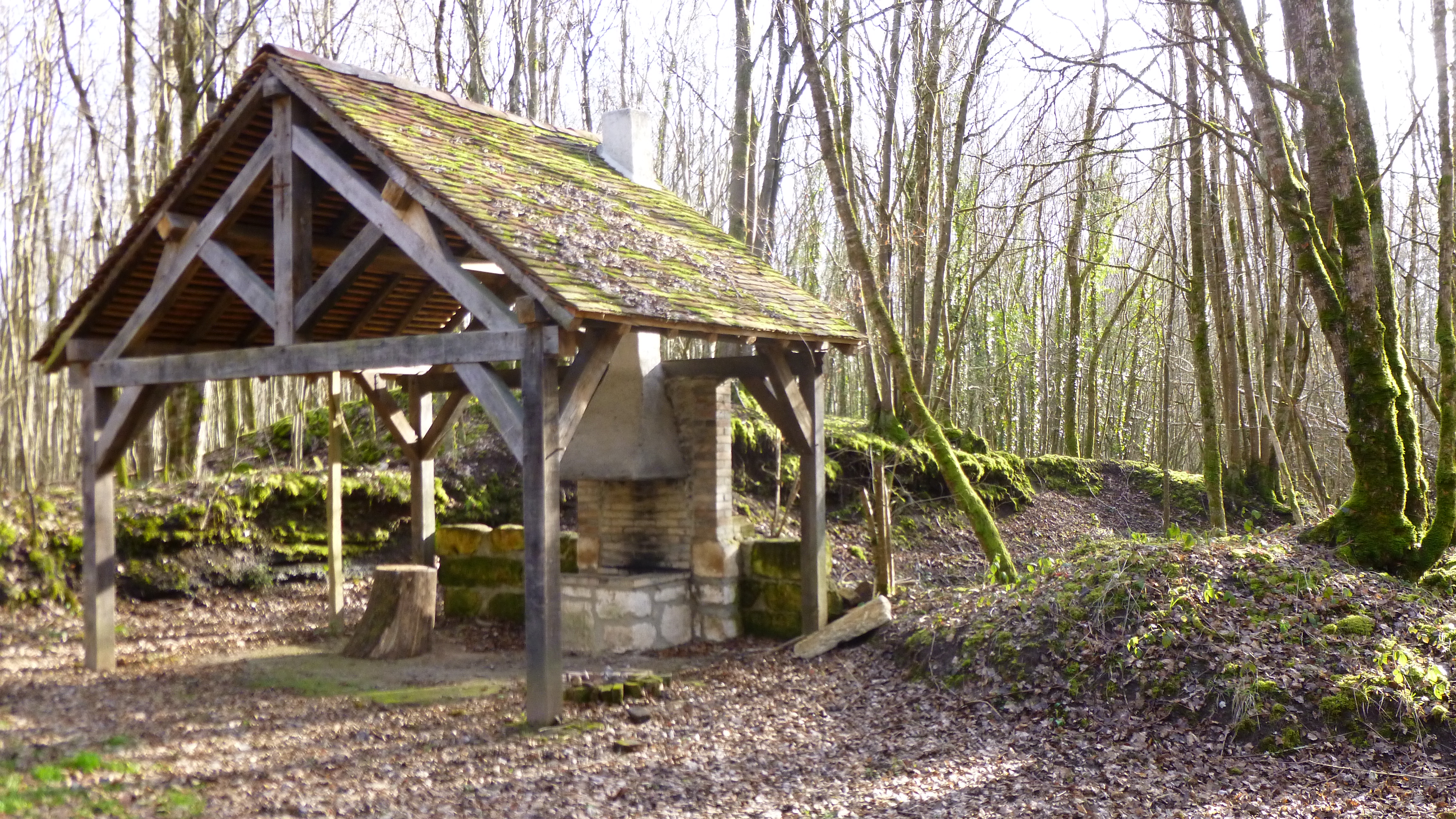
The new forge

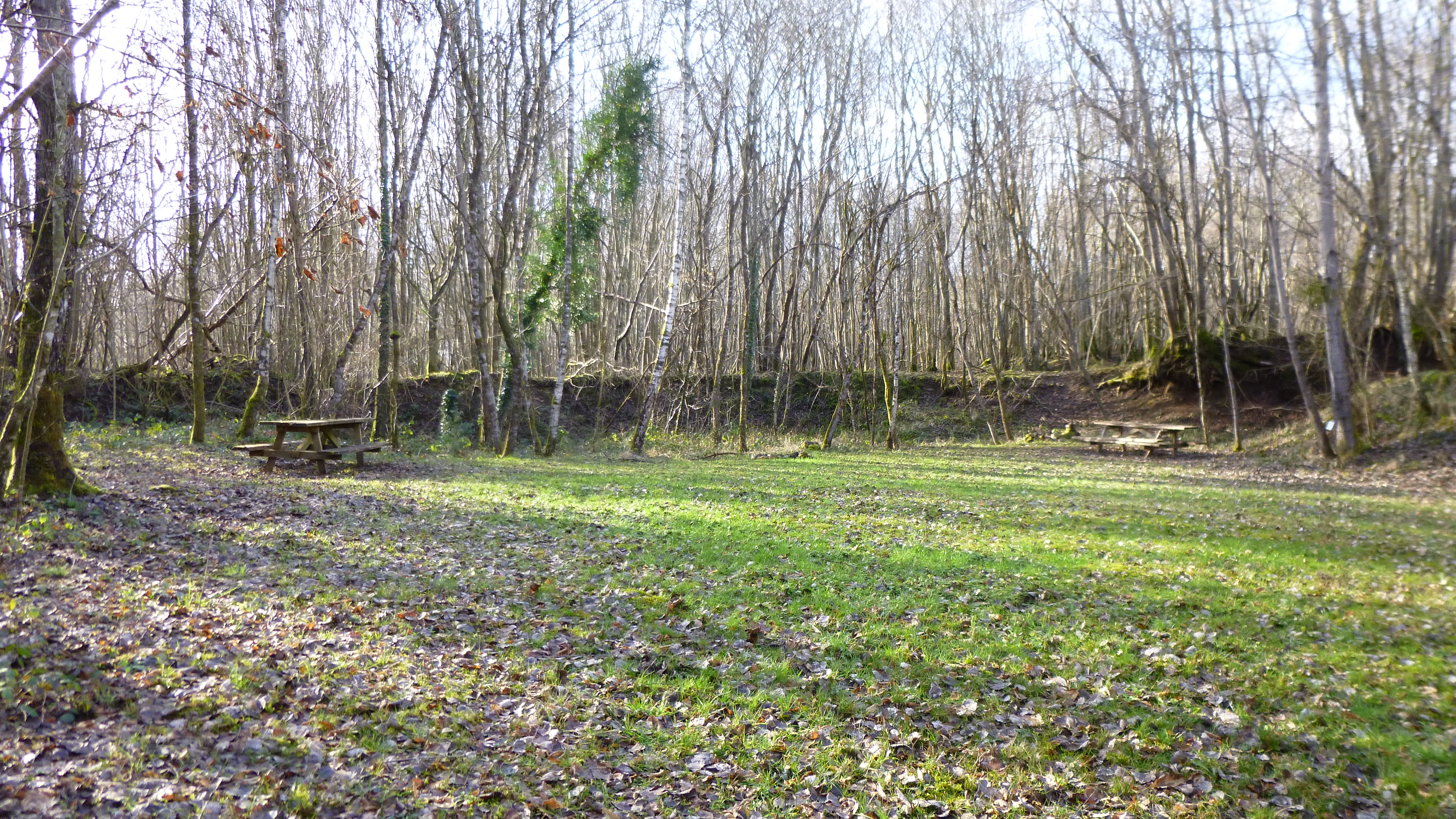
The Motte-Champlay site, now with benches and tables

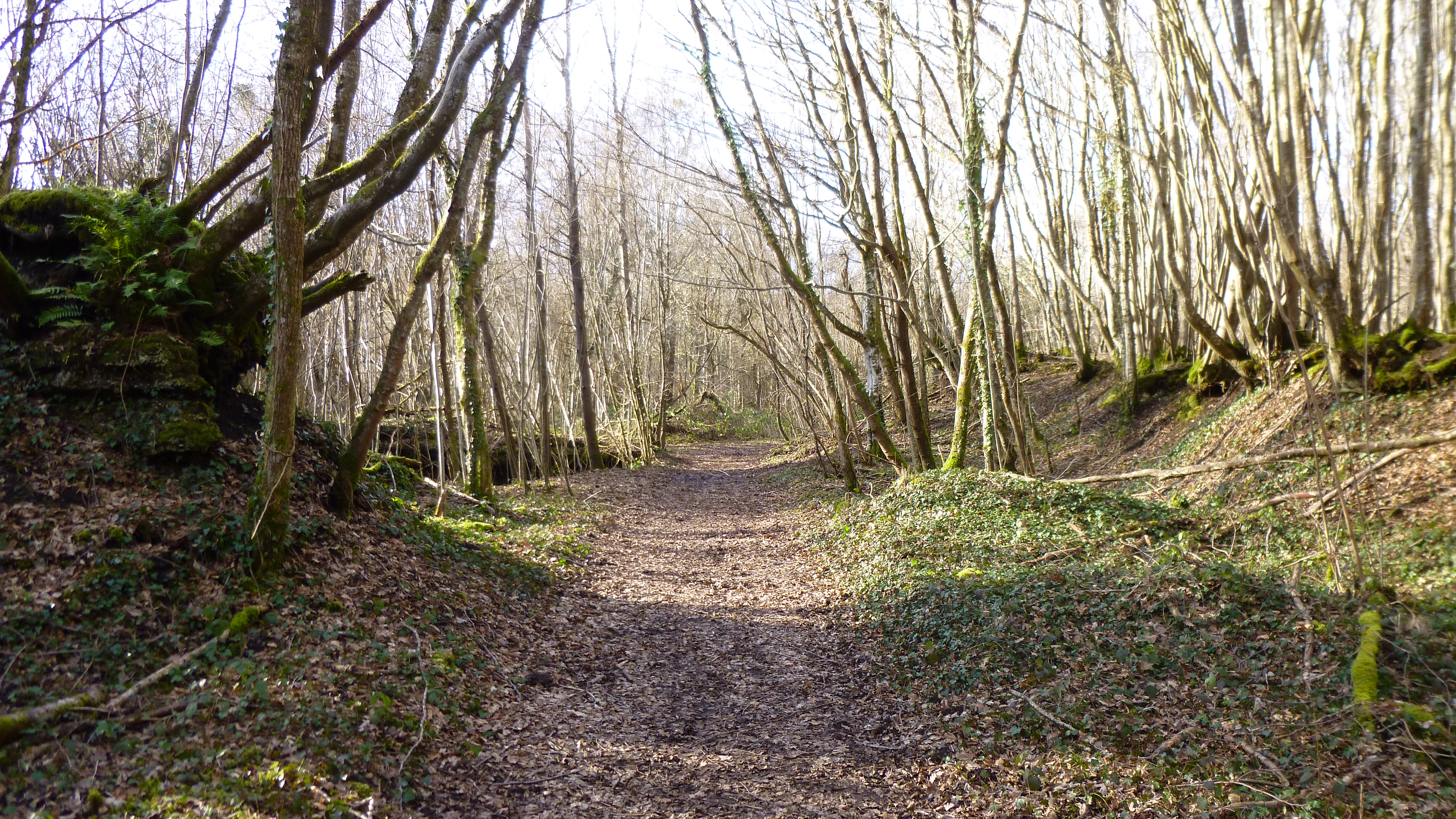
Welcoming path between trenches and mounds of slag

== See also ==
- Ferrier of Tannerre-en-Puisaye
- Communes of the Yonne department
