= Villiers-Saint-Benoît =

- Commune
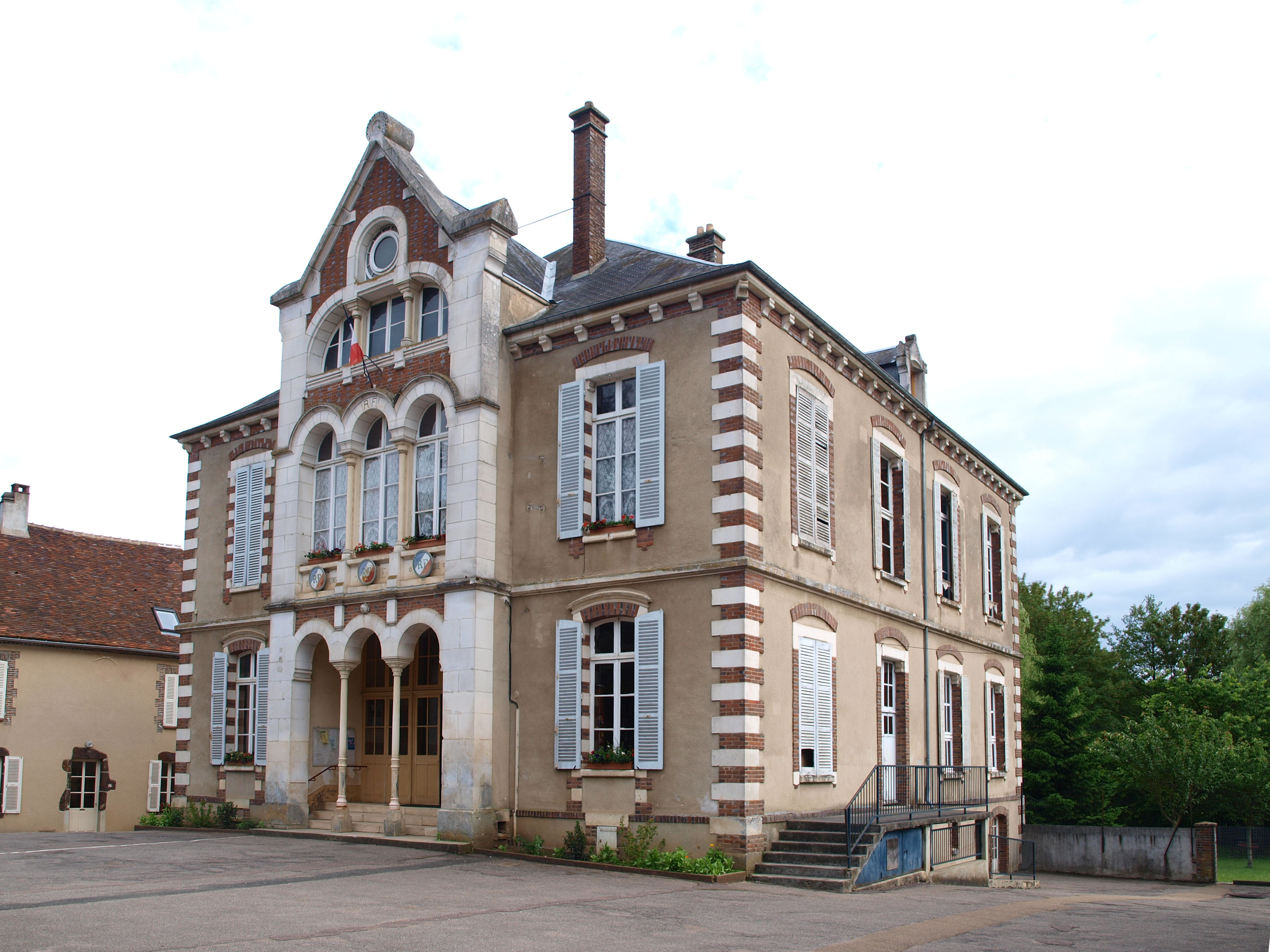
- The town hall in Villiers-Saint-Benoît

- Coat of arms
- Location of Villiers-Saint-Benoît
- Location within France Location within Bourgogne-Franche-Comté
- Coordinates: 47°46′57″N 3°12′42″E
- Country: France
- Region: Bourgogne-Franche-Comté
- Department: Yonne
- Arrondissement: Auxerre
- Canton: Cœur de Puisaye

Government
  - Mayor (2020–2026): Patrick Büttner
- Area^{1}: 34.04 km^{2} (13.14 sq mi)
- Highest elevation: 247 m (810 ft)
- Lowest elevation: 167 m (548 ft)
- Population (2023): 427
  - Density: 12.5/km^{2} (32.5/sq mi)
- Time zone: UTC+01:00 (CET)
  - Summer (DST): UTC+02:00 (CEST)
- INSEE/Postal code: 89472 /89130
- ^{1} French Land Register data, which excludes lakes, ponds, glaciers > 1 km^{2} (0.386 sq mi or 247 acres) and river estuaries.

Villiers-Saint-Benoît (French pronunciation: [vilje sɛ̃ bənwa]) is a commune in the Yonne department in Bourgogne-Franche-Comté in north-central France.

== See also ==
- Communes of the Yonne department
