= Dracy =

- Commune
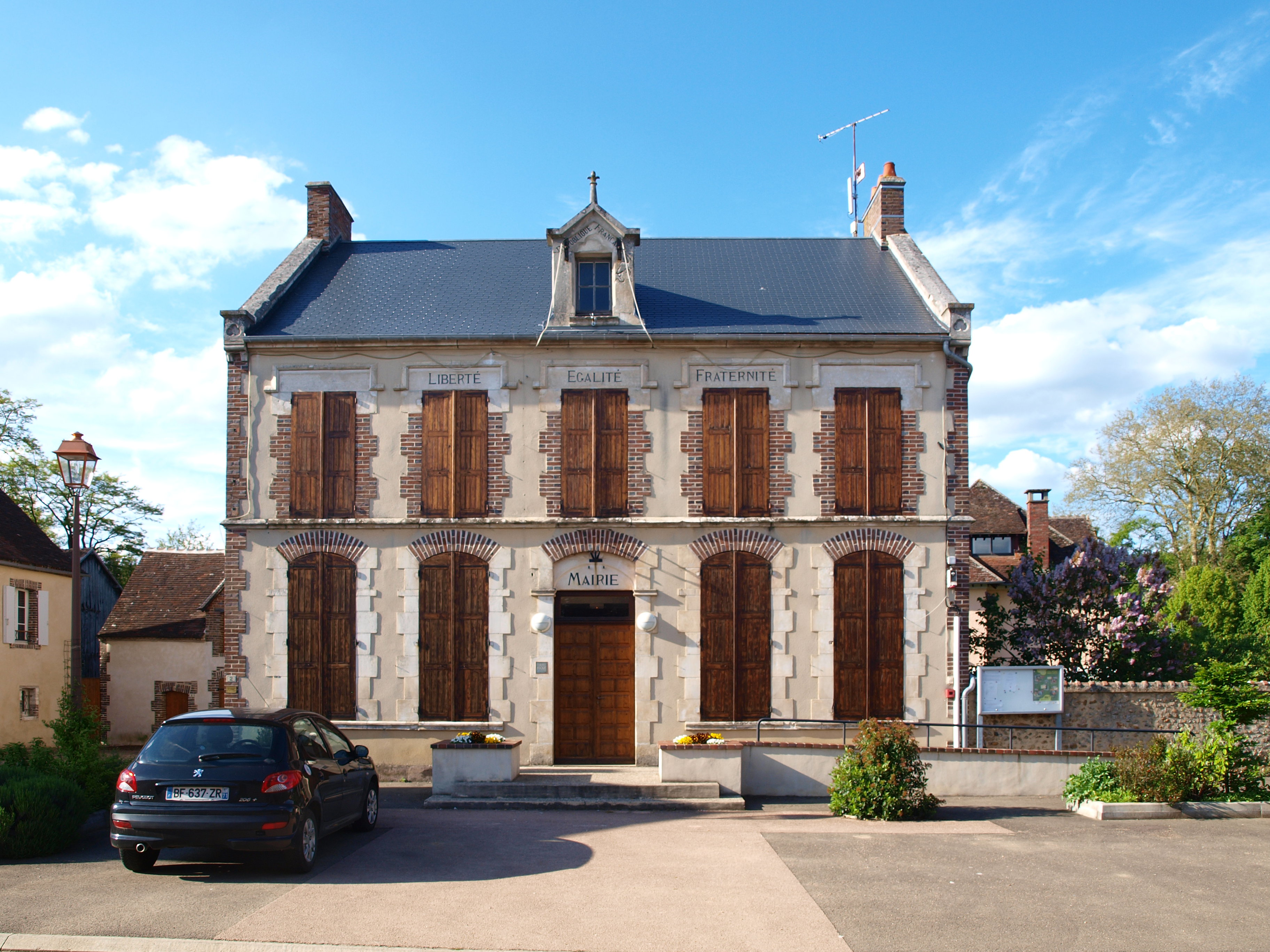
- The town hall in Dracy
- Location of Dracy
- Location within France Location within Bourgogne-Franche-Comté
- Coordinates: 47°45′31″N 3°15′05″E
- Country: France
- Region: Bourgogne-Franche-Comté
- Department: Yonne
- Arrondissement: Auxerre
- Canton: Cœur de Puisaye

Government
  - Mayor (2023–2026): Michel Prot
- Area^{1}: 21.86 km^{2} (8.44 sq mi)
- Highest elevation: 264 m (866 ft)
- Lowest elevation: 168 m (551 ft)
- Population (2023): 236
  - Density: 10.8/km^{2} (28.0/sq mi)
- Time zone: UTC+01:00 (CET)
  - Summer (DST): UTC+02:00 (CEST)
- INSEE/Postal code: 89147 /89130
- ^{1} French Land Register data, which excludes lakes, ponds, glaciers > 1 km^{2} (0.386 sq mi or 247 acres) and river estuaries.

Dracy (French pronunciation: [dʁasi]) is a commune in the Yonne department in Bourgogne-Franche-Comté in north-central France.

== Geography ==
The river Ouanne forms part of the commune's eastern border, flows north-westward through the north-eastern part of the commune, crosses the village and forms part of its northern border.

== See also ==
- Communes of the Yonne department
