= Puisaye =

Coordinates: 47°38′N 3°04′E

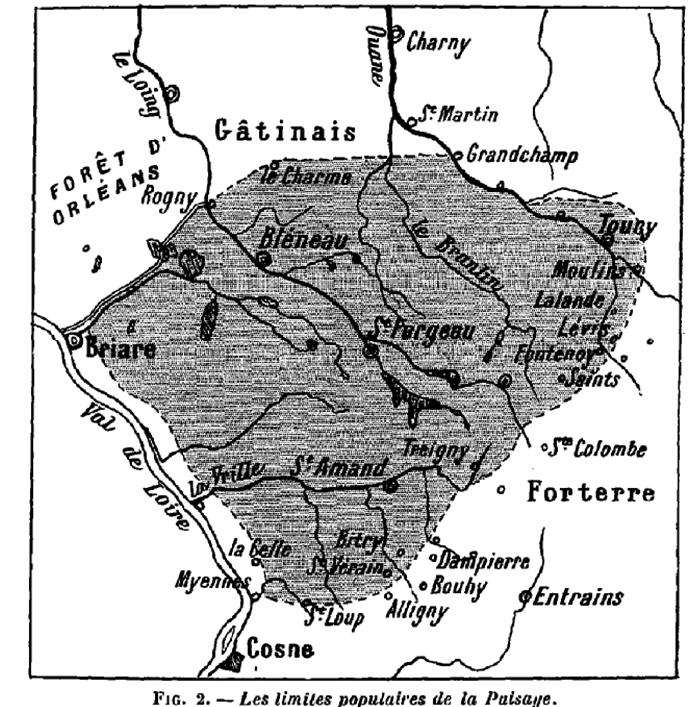
- Map of Puisaye by cartographer Gustave Goujon, 1906

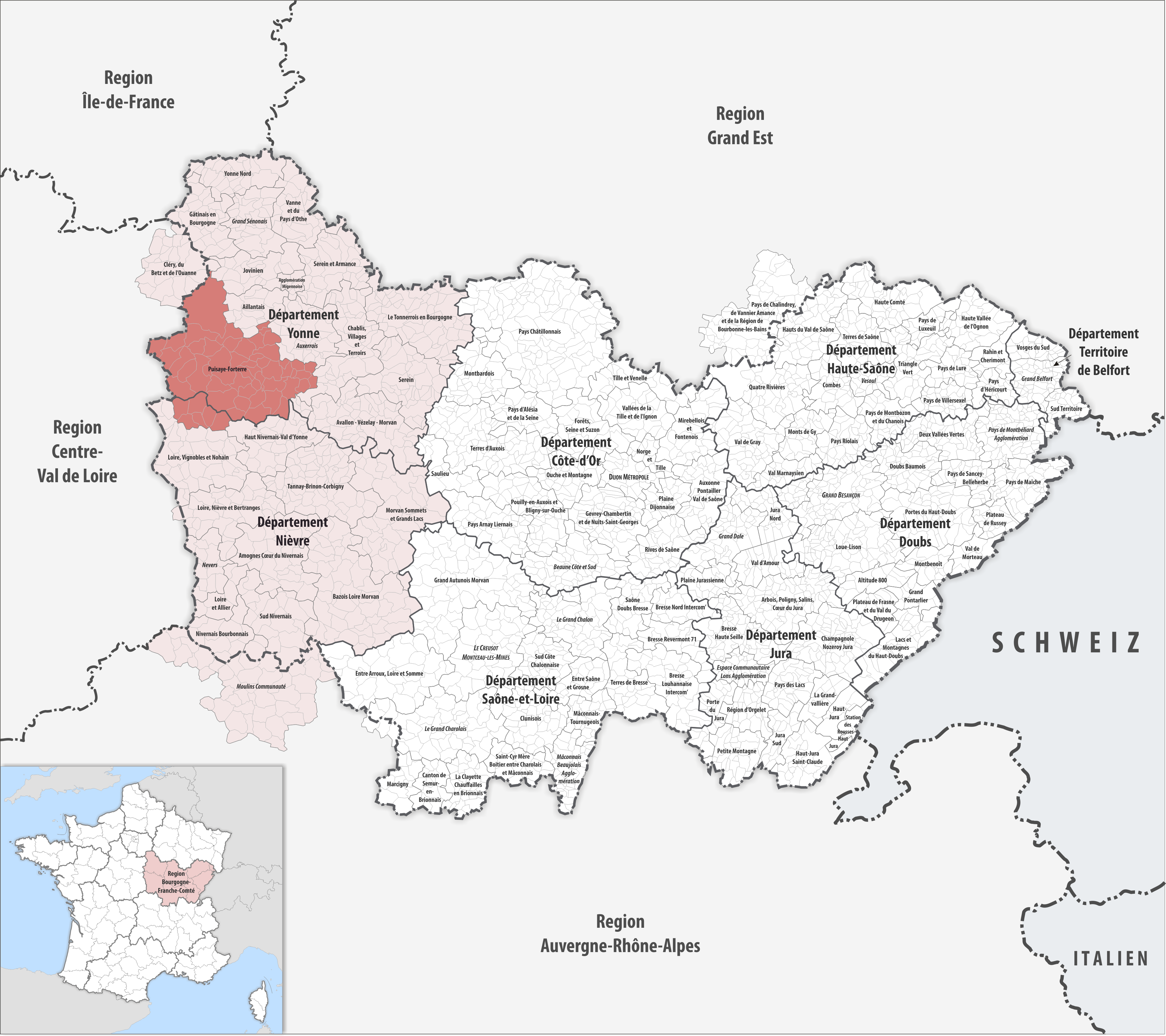
- The communauté de communes de Puisaye-Forterre (darker red) in the region of Bourgogne-Franche-Comté, including most of Puisaye except its western part in the Loiret
- Country: France
- Départements: Loiret, Nièvre, Yonne
- Arrondissements: Montargis, Cosne-Cours-sur-Loire, Auxerre
- Cantons: Gien, Pouilly-sur-Loire, Cœur de Puisaye, Vincelles

The Puisaye (French pronunciation: [pɥizɛ]) is a natural and historical region of France, now divided between the departments of Loiret, Nièvre and Yonne. Its historical and administrative center is the town of Saint-Fargeau. Its inhabitants are known as Poyaudins (or Puisayens).

== Name ==
According to local 19th-century historian Ambroise Challe, the name Puisaye first appeared in 12th-century charters. It was variously spelled Poiseia, Puseium, Pusaya, Puiseia, Puteacia, or Poidaceia.

== Geography ==
Since the Puisaye is not an administrative region, its exact definition and limits can vary depending on time and context. Its core is a land of forests and ponds, traversed by several rivers including the Loing. It is bordered by Sancerrois to the west across the Loire river, Gâtinais to the northwest, Auxerrois to the northeast, Forterre to the southeast, and Donziais to the south.

The Communauté de communes de Puisaye-Forterre, created in 2017, covers most of the historical Puisaye, though not its Western fringe in the Loiret. It also includes the geologically distinct land of Forterre as well as parts of the Auxerrois, both to the east. The name Puisaye appears to exert a certain attraction, leading communities that are not historically part of Puisaye to adopt it. This has been the case of Sougères-en-Puisaye, which changed its name from Sougères-les-Simon in 1955, and of Charny-Orée-de-Puisaye, which adopted this name when it was formed by the merger of 14 villages in 2016. As a result, the contemporary usage of the word Puisaye can cover a broader territory than has been the case in the past.

The Lac du Bourdon is the largest body of water in Puisaye, albeit far from the only one. It is a reservoir formed in 1901 to help regulate water levels of the Briare Canal. The Bourdon is a small tributary of the Loing that feeds into and from the lake.

== History ==
The territory of Puisaye was Christianized in late antiquity. Some villages are traditionally associated with late-Antiquity saints, e.g. Priscus in Saints-en-Puisaye. A Carolingian manuscript lists several Puisaye parishes on the itinerary of Saint Aunarius, Bishop of Auxerre in the late 6th century, namely Neuvy-sur-Loire (Novus Vicus), Briare (Brioderus), Bléneau (Blanoilus), Bitry (Vitriacus), and Arquian (Arcuncius), and also refers to Toucy (Tociacus).

The lordship of Toucy was prominent in the High Middle Ages, as several of its leaders and family affiliates played significant roles, not least as associates of the House of Courtenay in their overseas endeavors. Meanwhile, the south of the Puisaye was in the orbit of the County of Nevers and specifically of the Barony of Donzy.

The crisis of the late Middle Ages and specifically the Hundred Years' War marked a rupture in the history of the region. Toucy was devastated in the runup to the Battle of Cravant, and was subsequently displaced by Saint-Fargeau as the main urban center of the Puisaye. Antoine de Chabannes significantly developed Saint-Fargeau, reconstructing its castle but also founding a hospital there. Generally, the century between 1450 and 1550 was a time of prosperity and renewal in the region, still represented in the landscape by numerous village churches built during that era. This period of prosperity ended with the Wars of Religion and troubles of the early 17th century.

Former province of Orléanais in the 18th century, with Puisaye to the far east

By the end of France's Ancien Régime, the core of Puisaye including Bléneau, Saint-Fargeau, Toucy and Saint-Sauveur was part of the province of Orléanais. It was a provincial borderland, with parts of the present communauté de communes de Puisaye-Forterre in Champagne (e.g. Charny), Burgundy (e.g. Pourrain, Courson-les-Carrières), and Nivernais (e.g. Saint-Vérain). Moreover, Île-de-France (e.g. Courtenay) was close by to the north, and Berry just across the Loire river.

=== Lordship of Puisaye ===
The Lordship of Puisaye is attested under that name from the late 13th century to the late 16th century, corresponding to an area that varied across time but generally included the towns of Bléneau, Mézilles, Saint-Fargeau, and until the early 16th century, Toucy.

The lordship of Puisaye was inherited by the Counts, then Dukes of Bar following the 1255 marriage between Theobald II, Count of Bar and Joanna of Toucy, heiress of a lineage that started with Ythier de Narbonne in the 11th century (Maison de Toucy). On Joanna of Toucy's death in 1317 the lordship went to Edward I, Count of Bar and then to his son Henry IV, Count of Bar, and grandson, Robert, Duke of Bar. One of Robert's sons, John of Bar, inherited the lordship (but not the Duchy of Bar) when Robert died in 1411, but he was himself soon killed at the Battle of Agincourt in October 1415. The Lordship of Puisaye was then seized, together with the Duchy (whose ruler Edward III was also killed in Agincourt) by Cardinal Louis of Bar, brother of John and Edward and a significant political figure of the era.

On Louis's death the lordship of Puisaye went to John Jacob, Marquis of Montferrat, son of Marquis Theodore II who had married Louis's sister Joanna. John Jacob sold parts of the lordship to Georges de La Trémoille, but he was not able or willing to pay and John Jacob's sons recovered them in the late 1440s. They in turn sold the entire lordship to Jacques Coeur in February 1450. After Jacques Coeur's downfall in 1451, the lordship was taken by Antoine de Chabannes. Charles VII's decision of 29 May 1453 specifically granted him: "(1) the lands, castles and lordships of Saint-Fargeau, of Lavau, of La Couldre, of Perreuse, of Champignelles, of Mézilles, or Villeneuve-les-Genêts and their dependencies; (2) the lands of Saint-Maurice-sur-Aveyron, Melleroy, La Frenaie, Fontenelles, and their dependencies; (3) the Barony of Toucy with its belongings and dependencies." Jacques Coeur's family sued, but eventually the Chabannes were able to keep their Puisaye domains.

After the death of Antoine's son John of Chabannes in 1503, the lordship was divided between his two young daughters. Antoinette (1498-ca. 1527) received most of Puisaye including Saint-Fargeau. In 1515 she married René d'Anjou-Mézières (1483-1521) who thus became lord of Puisaye as later was his son Nicolas (1518-1569). These domains later went to François, Duke of Montpensier following his 1566 marriage with Renée d'Anjou-Mézière, daughter of Nicolas d'Anjou. John of Chabannes's elder daughter Avoye (1492-ca. 1545) kept other Chabannes domains including Toucy, and in 1504 she married Aymon du Prie (or Prye, a locale near La Fermeté and home of the château de Prye). The latter's family kept the Barony of Toucy following Aymon's death in 1510.

In 1575, King Henry III elevated the County of Saint-Fargeau to a Duché-Pairie. After that, the reference to Puisaye as a lordship or political entity, which had already been infrequent under Nicolas d'Anjou, appears to fade away. In the archives of the château de Saint-Fargeau, however, there are references to the "duché de Saint-Fargeau et de Puisaye" in a document from 1606 and "duché de Saint-Fargeau et du païs de Puisaie" in another one from 1714.

== Personalities connected to Puisaye ==
=== Antiquity and Middle Ages ===
- Prix de Saints or Priscus (d. 274), soldier and Christian martyr decapitated together with companions near Saints-en-Puisaye
- Hermenold d'Auxerre (771-?), associate of Charlemagne and first Count of Auxerre, founded a monastery in Saint-Sauveur-en-Puisaye
- Rodulfus Glaber (985-1047), chronicler and monk at the priory of Moutiers-en-Puisaye
- Ithier de Narbonne (11th century), founder of the Maison de Toucy
- Gilo of Toucy (ca. 1080–1140), cardinal and papal legate, born in Toucy
- Narjot III de Toucy (died 1241), Regent of the Latin Empire of Constantinople in 1228-1231
- Pierre de Charny (died 1274), Archbishop of Sens born in Charny
- Philippe de Toucy (died 1277), Regent of the Latin Empire of Constantinople in 1243–1248, Admiral of the Kingdom of Sicily in 1273
- Narjot IV de Toucy (died 1293), Captain-General of the Kingdom of Albania, Admiral of the Kingdom of Sicily in 1277, and bailli of the Principality of Achaea in 1282
- Mathieu of Ratilly (13th century), builder of the Château de Ratilly near Treigny
- Robert Knolles (ca. 1325–1407), English warlord during the Hundred Years' War, based in Malicorne between 1358 and 1360
- Antoine de Chabannes (1408-1488), Lord of Puisaye and builder of the Château de Saint-Fargeau

=== Early modern period ===
- Pierre Grognet (ca. 1460–1540), Catholic priest and poet from Toucy
- Antoine de Rochechouart (ca. 1488–1544), military leader and builder of the Château de Saint-Amand-en-Puisaye
- Hugues Cosnier (1573-1629), engineer and builder of the pioneering Briare Canal between the Loire and Seine rivers (via the Loing) which runs on the northwestern fringe of Puisaye
- Étienne Texier d'Hautefeuille (1626-1702), Knight Hospitaller and provincial prior of the Order for Aquitaine from 1691 to 1702, born in Malicorne
- Anne Marie Louise d'Orléans, Duchess of Montpensier (1627-1693) known as la Grande Mademoiselle, owner of the Château de Saint-Fargeau who lived there in exile from Paris from 1652 to 1657
- Alexandre Dubois-Descours (1680-1754), naval commander who participated in the Siege of Louisbourg (1745), born in Bitry

=== Late modern and contemporary period ===
==== Political, administrative and military leaders ====
- Edme Henri de Beaujeu (1741-1818), army general during the French Revolution, born in Mézilles
- Louis-Michel le Peletier de Saint-Fargeau (1760-1793), iconic victim of the French Revolution
- Louis Dubois-Descours, marquis de la Maisonfort (1763-1827), army commander and author born in Bitry
- Mathieu Delabassée (1764-1830), army general during the Napoleonic Wars born in Saint-Fargeau
- Pierre Louis François Paultre de Lamotte (1774-1840), army general during the Napoleonic Wars born in Saint-Sauveur-en-Puisaye
- Louis Frémy (1805-1891), politician and banker, born in Saint-Fargeau and owner of a mansion in L'Orme du Pont near Saint-Sauveur-en-Puisaye
- Alfred Loreau (1843-1922), industrialist, politician and philanthropist, died in Briare
- Albert Grodet (1853-1933), colonial administrator in French Sudan, Equatorial Africa and French Guiana, born in Saint-Fargeau
- Georges Demetz (1865-1942), commander of French colonial troops during World War I, born in Saint-Fargeau
- Marcel Serret (1867-1916), army general killed during World War I, born in Bléneau
- Léon Noël (1888-1987), senior civil servant and politician, resistant during World War II and historian (including on Gilo of Toucy) who settled and died in Toucy

==== Scholars, scientists and industrialists ====
- Eusèbe Girault de Saint-Fargeau (1791-1855), geographer born in Saint-Fargeau
- Jean-Baptiste Robineau-Desvoidy (1799-1857), polymath and entomologist from Saint-Sauveur-en-Puisaye
- Onésime Delafond (1805-1861), veterinarian and pioneer of bacteriology born in Saint-Amand-en-Puisaye
- Guy Adolphe Arrault (1806-1861), mineralogist at France's Corps des mines from Toucy, of which he was also mayor from 1848 to 1860
- Jean-Félix Bapterosses (1813-1885), industrialist and developer of the Faïencerie de Gien, died in Briare
- Pierre Larousse (1817-1875), one of the foremost French lexicographers, born in Toucy
- Eugène Lefébure (1838-1908), Egyptologist who worked in the Valley of the Kings, born in Prunoy
- Alexandre Parat (1843-1931), Catholic priest and polymath scholar from Toucy
- Edgar Bérillon (1859-1948), psychiatrist and researcher of hypnosis, born in Saint-Fargeau
- Henri Vigreux (1869-1951), inventor of an early type of fractional distillation column, born in Parly
- Gaston Fleischel (1885-1965), inventor and developer of an automatic transmission system that paved the way for modern gearboxes in a manufacturing facility in Bléneau
- Hubert Reeves (born 1932), astrophysicist and popularizer of science, has lived part of his time in Malicorne for decades

==== Literature and arts ====
- Henri Harpignies (1819-1916), French landscape painter of the Barbizon school, buried in Saint-Privé
- Colette (1873-1954), author who was born in Saint-Sauveur-en-Puisaye and wrote acclaimed works about her native land
- Julienne Mathieu (1874-1943), early silent film actress from Saint-Sauveur-en-Puisaye
- Henri Nibelle (1883-1967), organist and composer born in Briare
- Marie Noël (1883-1967), poet who spent her vacations in Diges from 1928 and 1956
- Robert Gall (1918-1990), author of the lyrics of songs for Edith Piaf and for his daughter France Gall, born in Saint-Fargeau
- Norbert Pierlot (1919-1979), stoneware artist who promoted Puisaye pottery and renovated the Château de Ratilly
- Hubert Deschamps (1923-1998), cinema actor who was buried in Chêne-Arnoult
- Antoine de Vinck (1924-1992), Belgian ceramist and sculptor, lived in Treigny from 1984 and died there
- Jean d'Ormesson (1925-2017), author whose family owned the Château de Saint-Fargeau about which he wrote in his novel Au Plaisir de Dieu
- Georges Suffert (1927-2012), journalist and writer, owned an estate in Saint-Vérain and was buried there

==== Other ====
- Georges Joseph Toutée (1855-1927), explorer of West Africa born in Saint-Fargeau
- Paul Cololian (1869-1956), physician and organizer of France's Armenian community, lived and died in Bléneau
- Jules Guiraud (1876-1952), First Deputy Governor of the Bank of France from 1934 to 1937, owner of the Château de Saint-Amand-en-Puisaye from 1935 to 1947
- Alcide Rousseau (1881-1974), record-breaking cyclist born in Champcevrais
- Michel Guyot (born 1947), owner of the Château de Saint-Fargeau and promoter of the Guédelon Castle project

== Selected sights ==
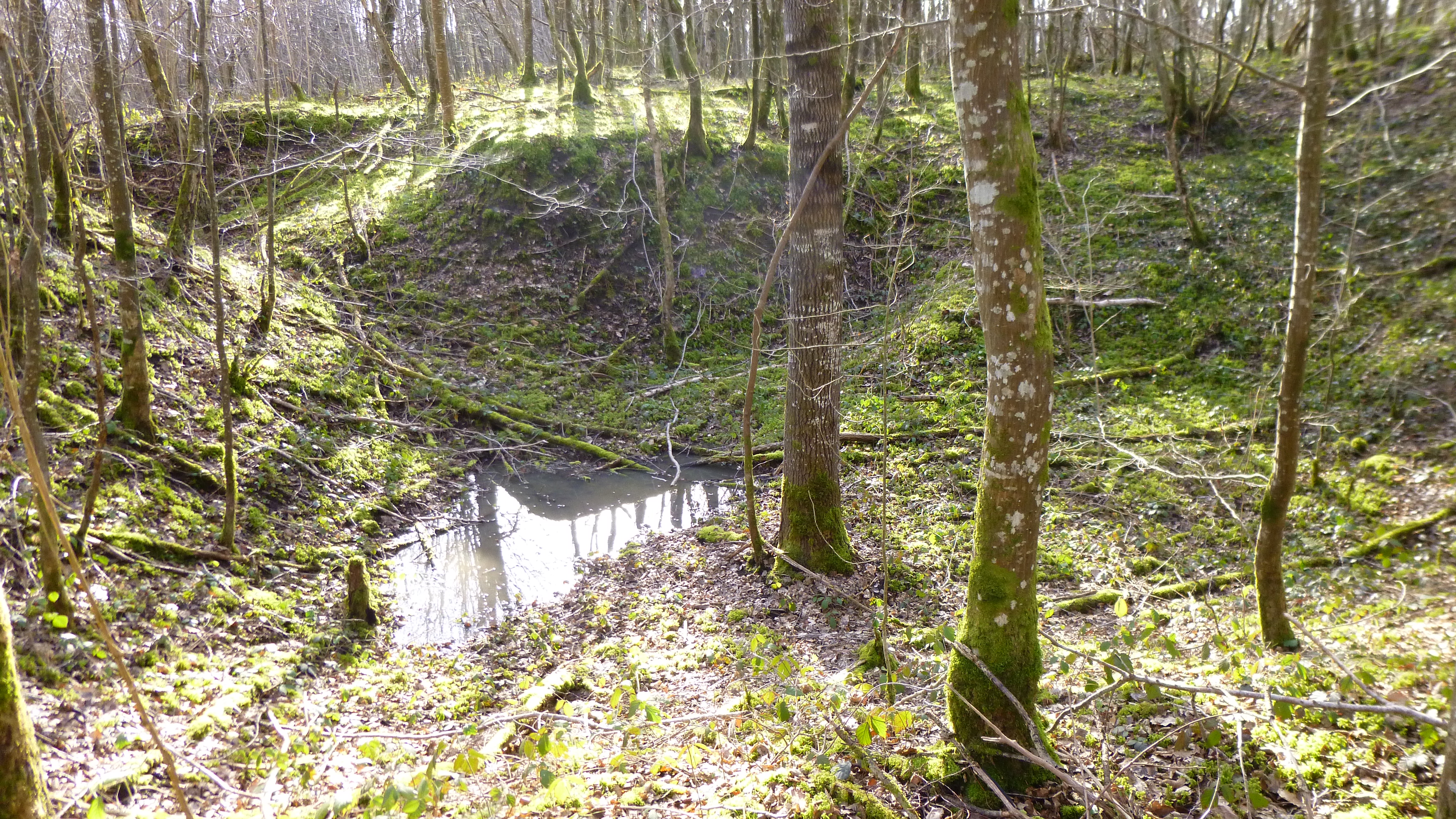
Ferrier of Tannerre-en-Puisaye, an iron mining and working site in Antiquity

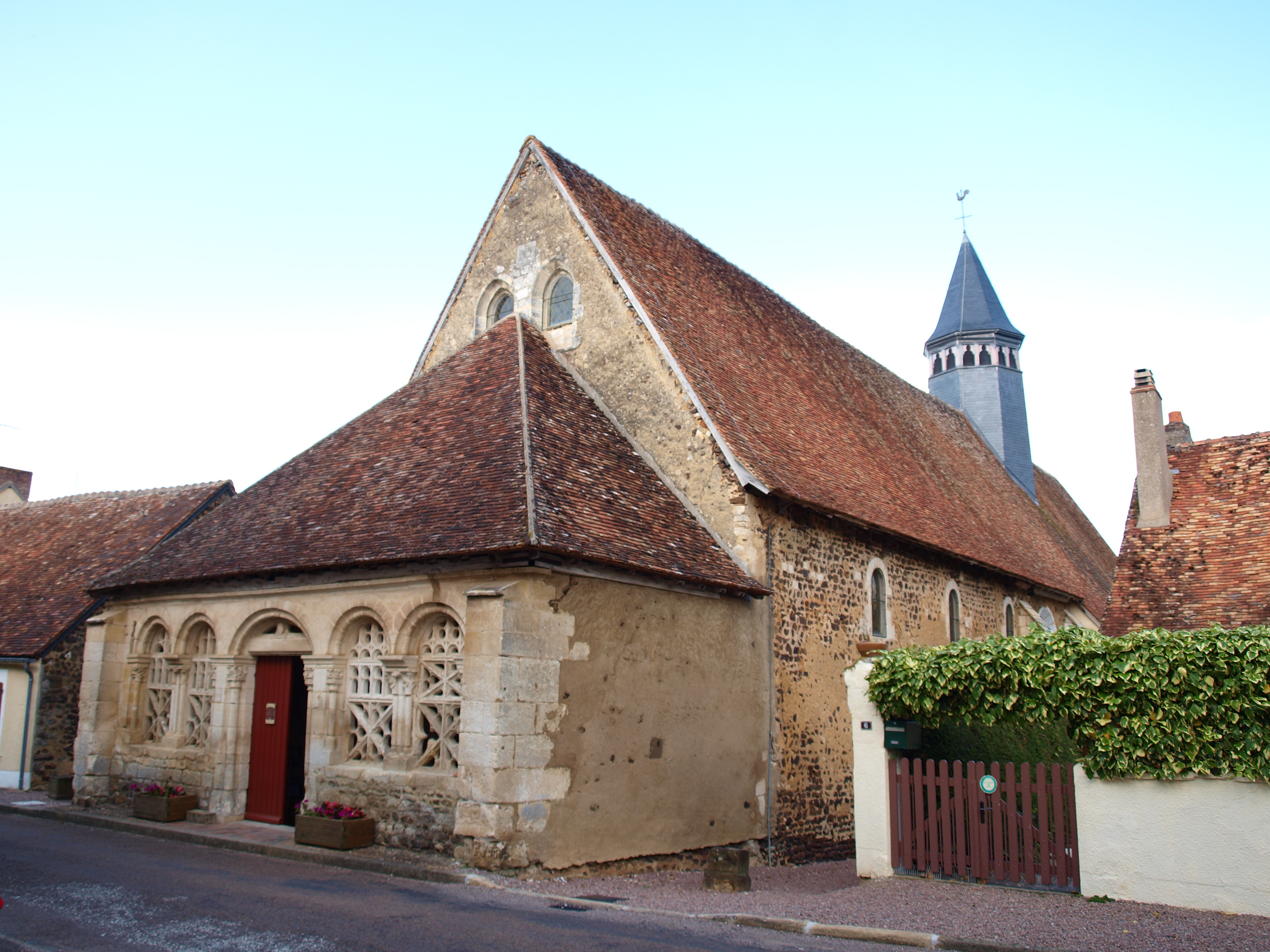
Church of the ancient monastery of Moutiers-en-Puisaye, home of Rodulfus Glaber

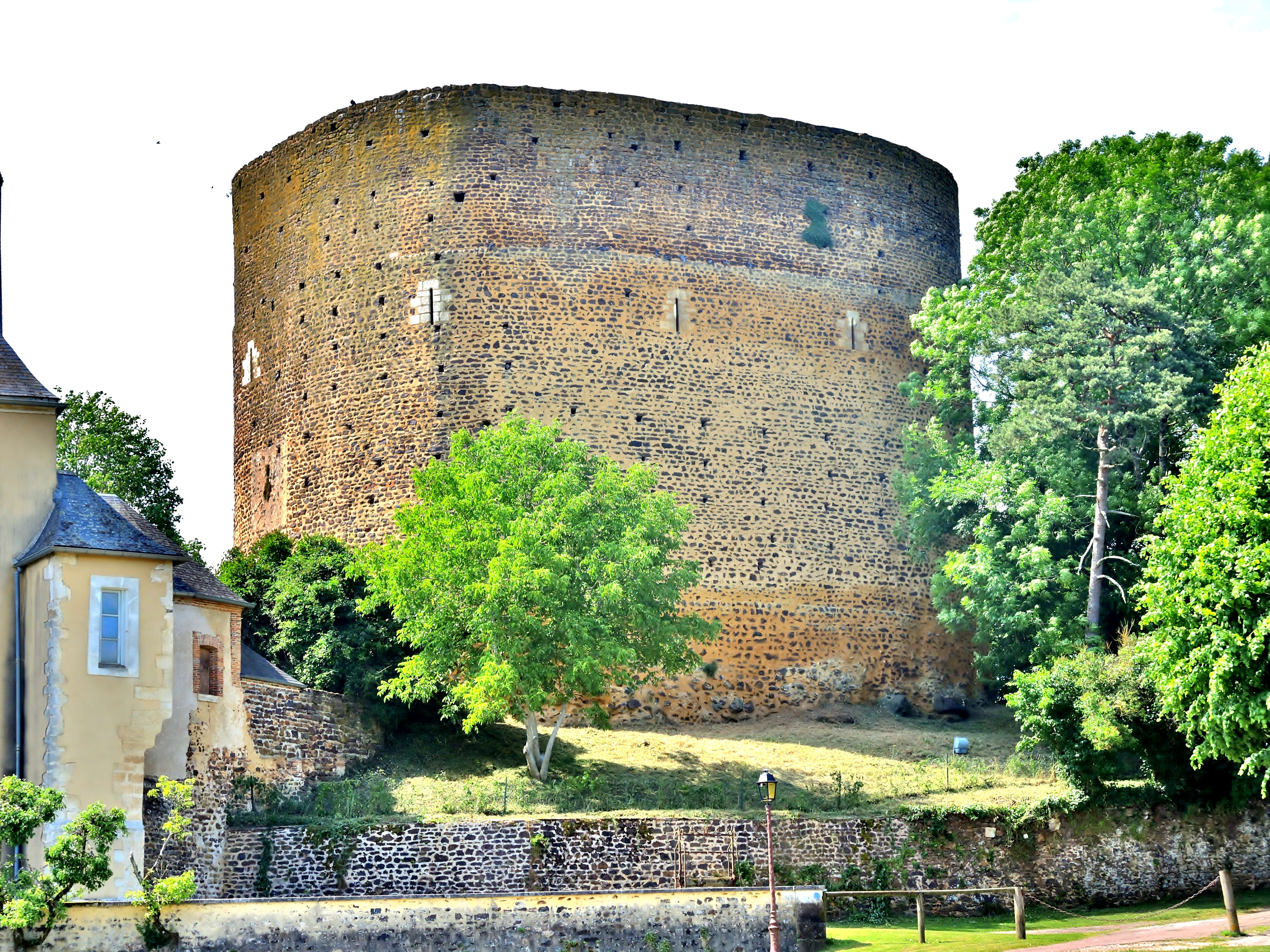
11th-century keep (tour sarrazine) in Saint-Sauveur-en-Puisaye

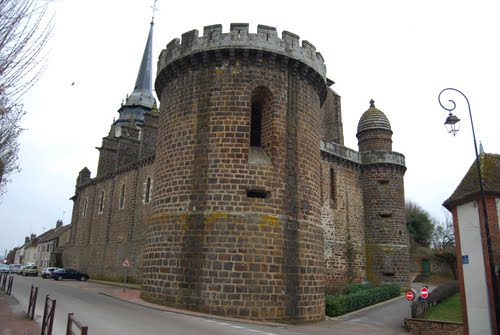
"Bishops' Tower" in Toucy, first built in the 12th century

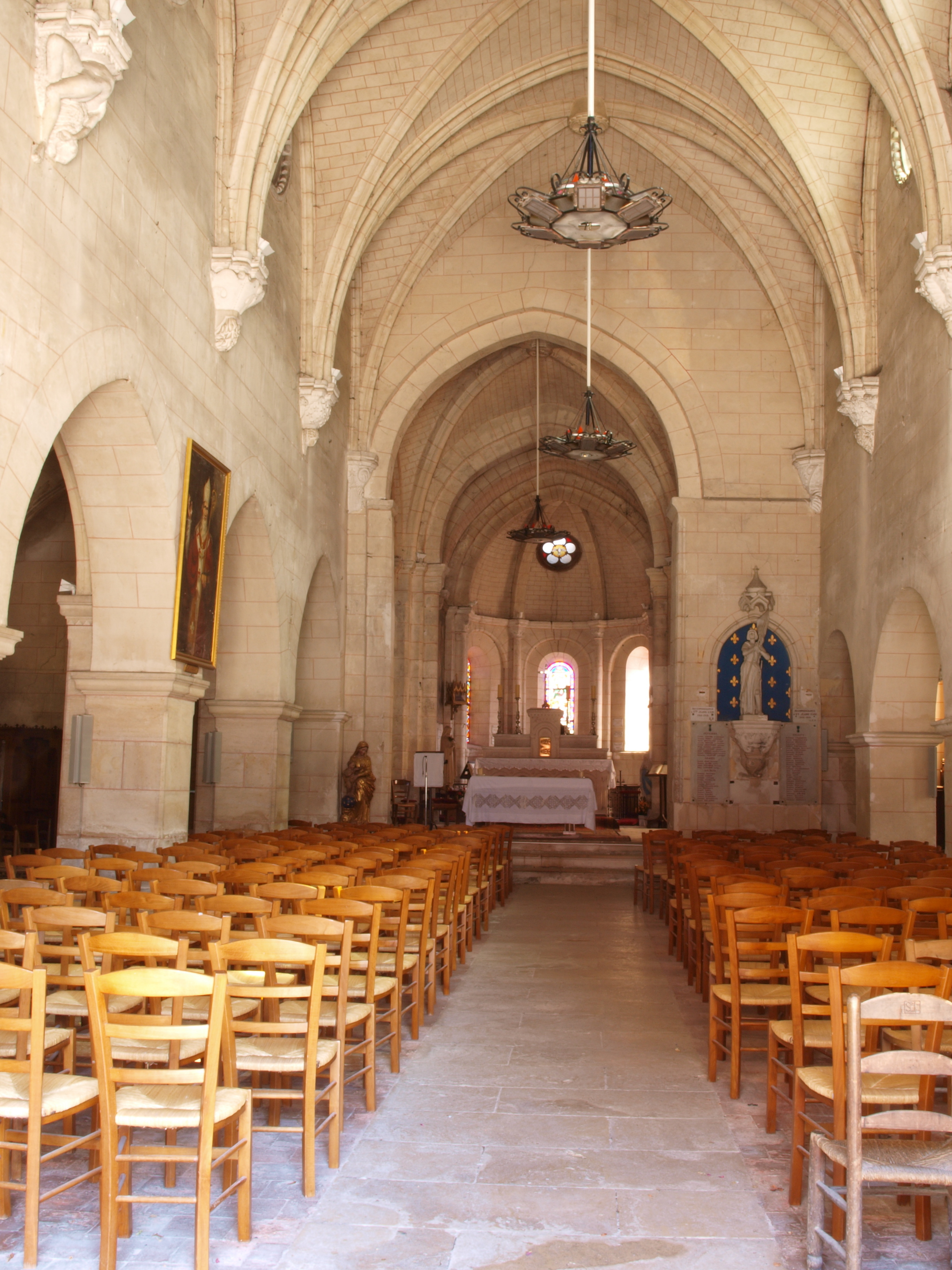
Saint-Loup Church in Bléneau

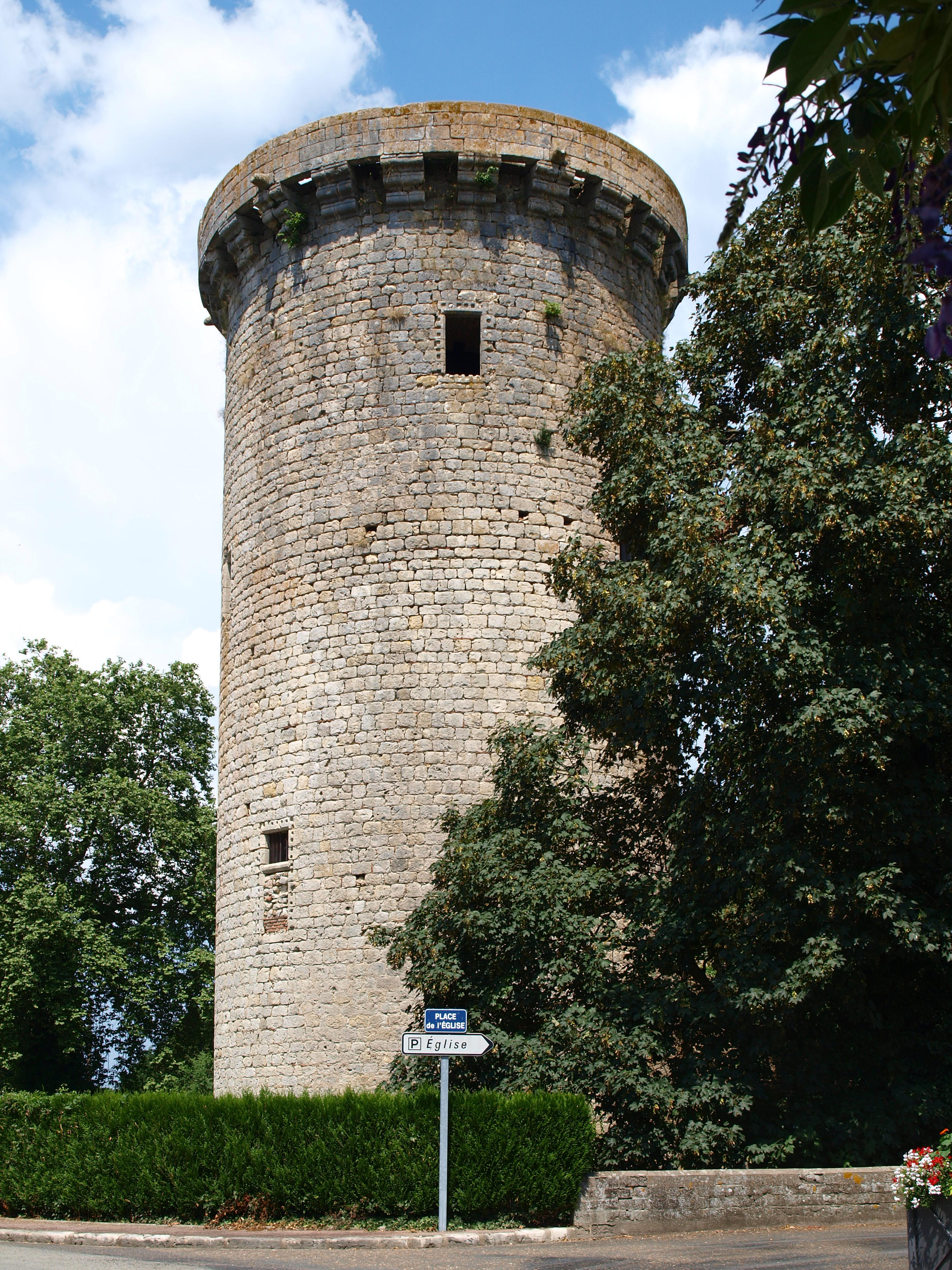
Medieval tower at Dammarie-en-Puisaye

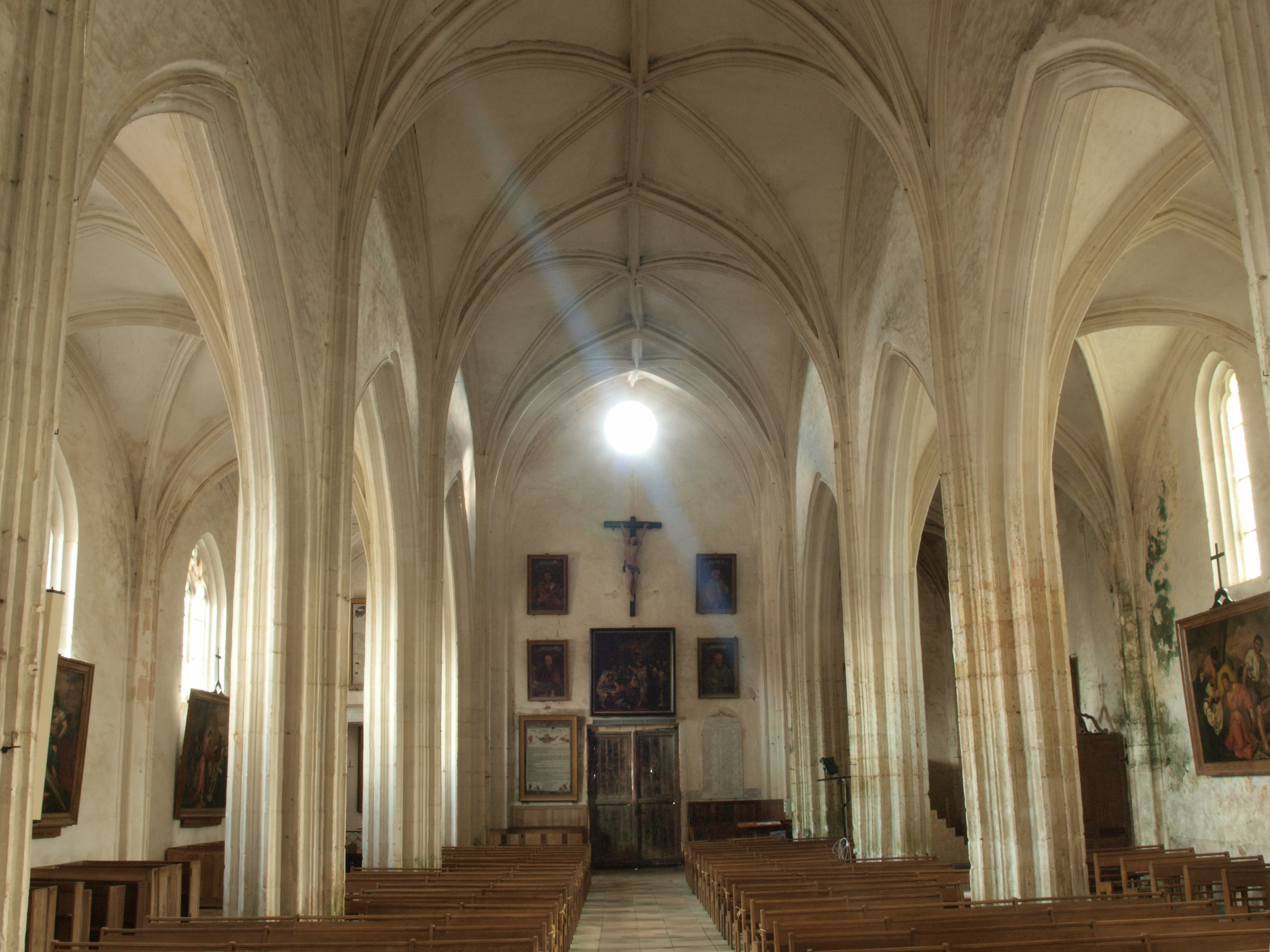
Saint-Symphorian Church in Treigny, known as the Cathédrale de la Puisaye

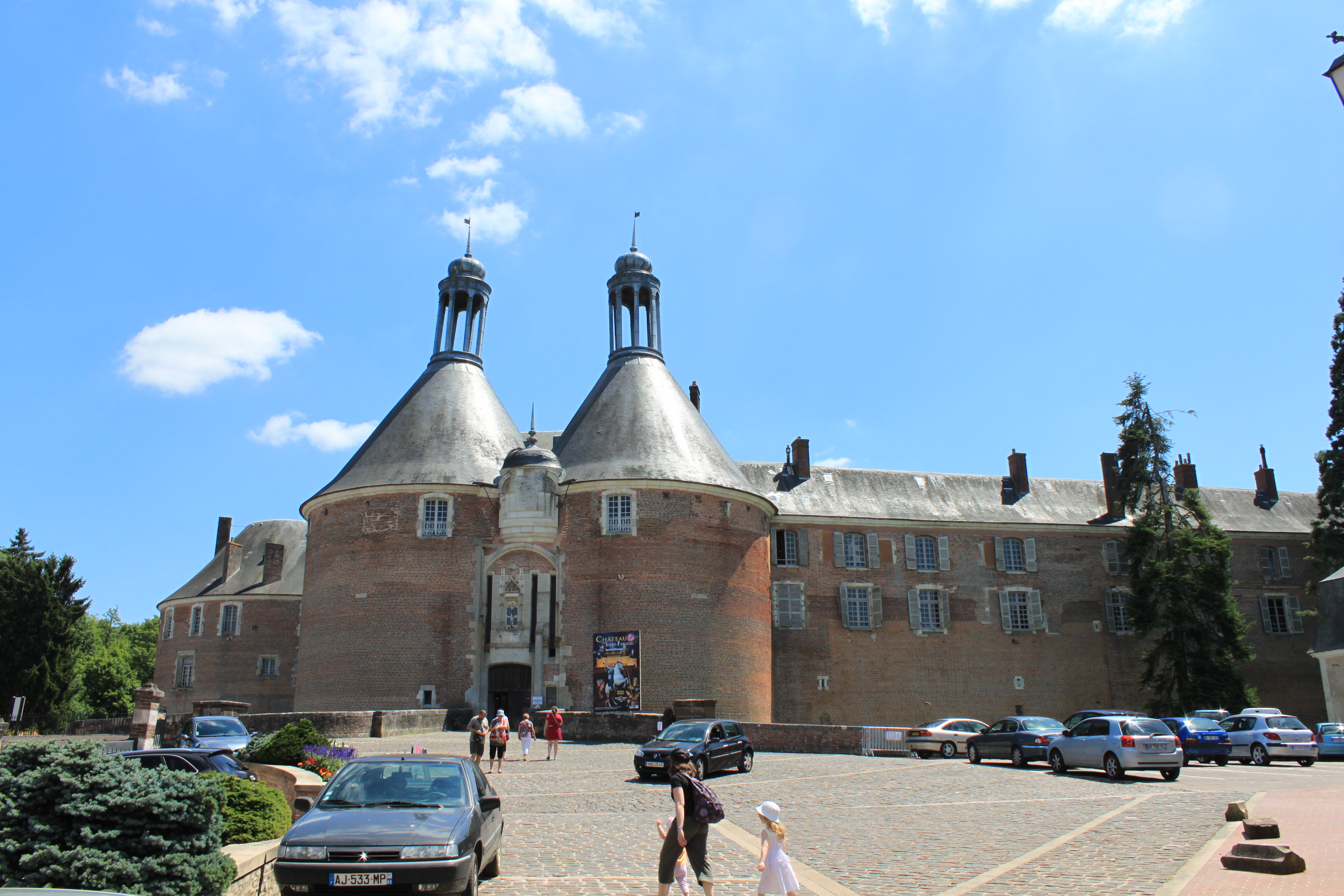
15th-century Château de Saint-Fargeau, built by Antoine de Chabannes

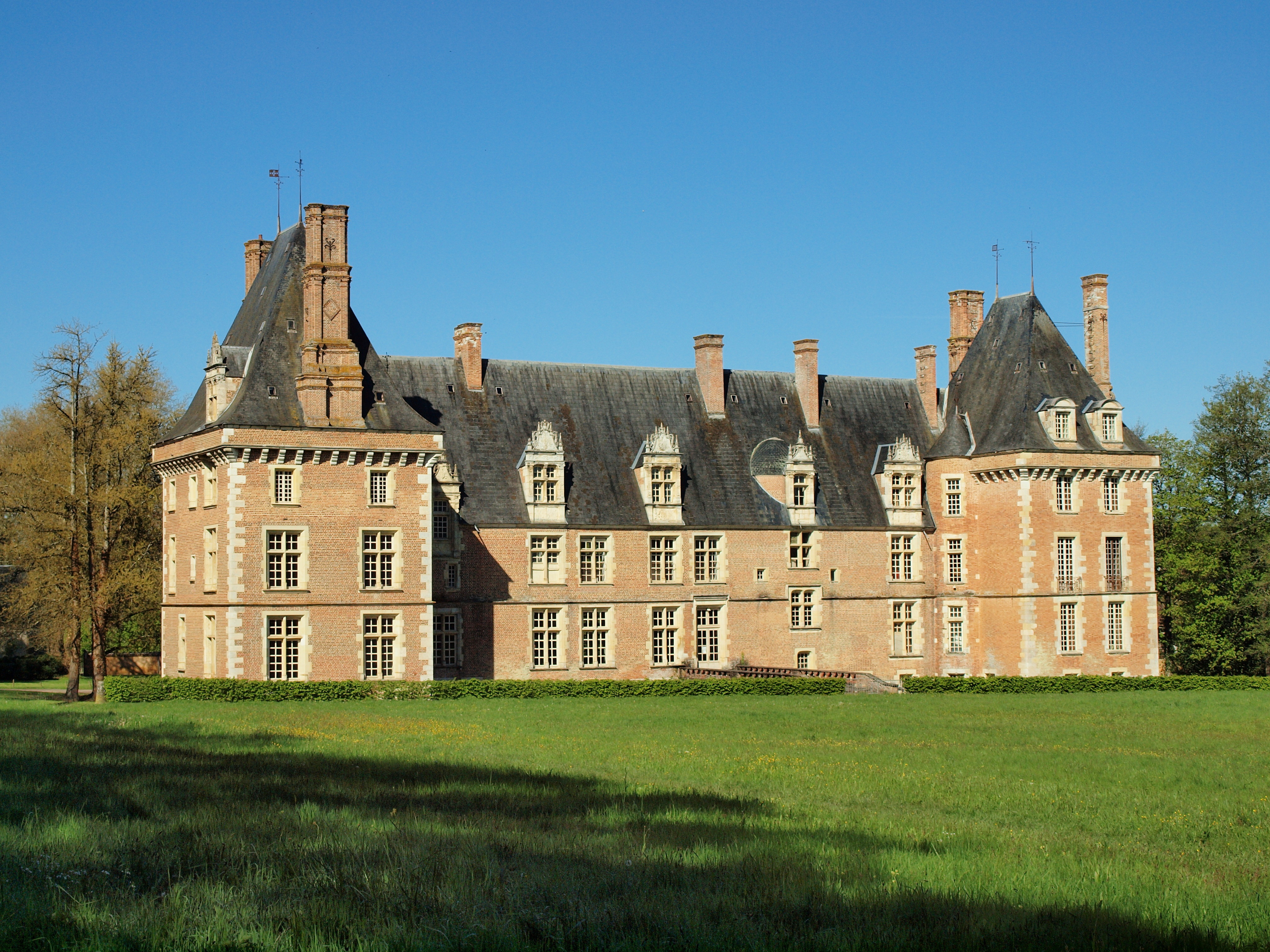
Château de Saint-Amand-en-Puisaye

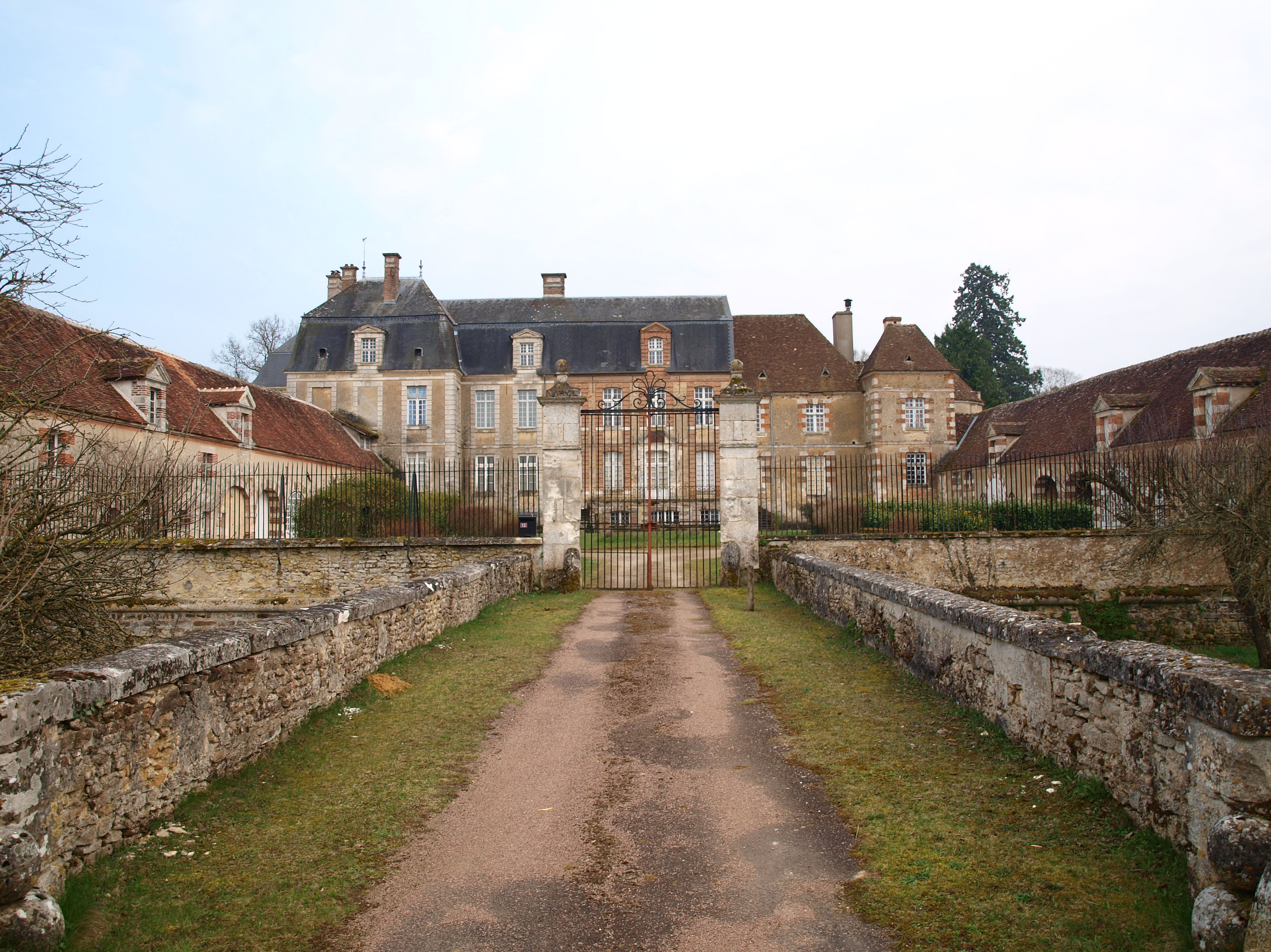
Chateau de Lalande, 16th-17th century

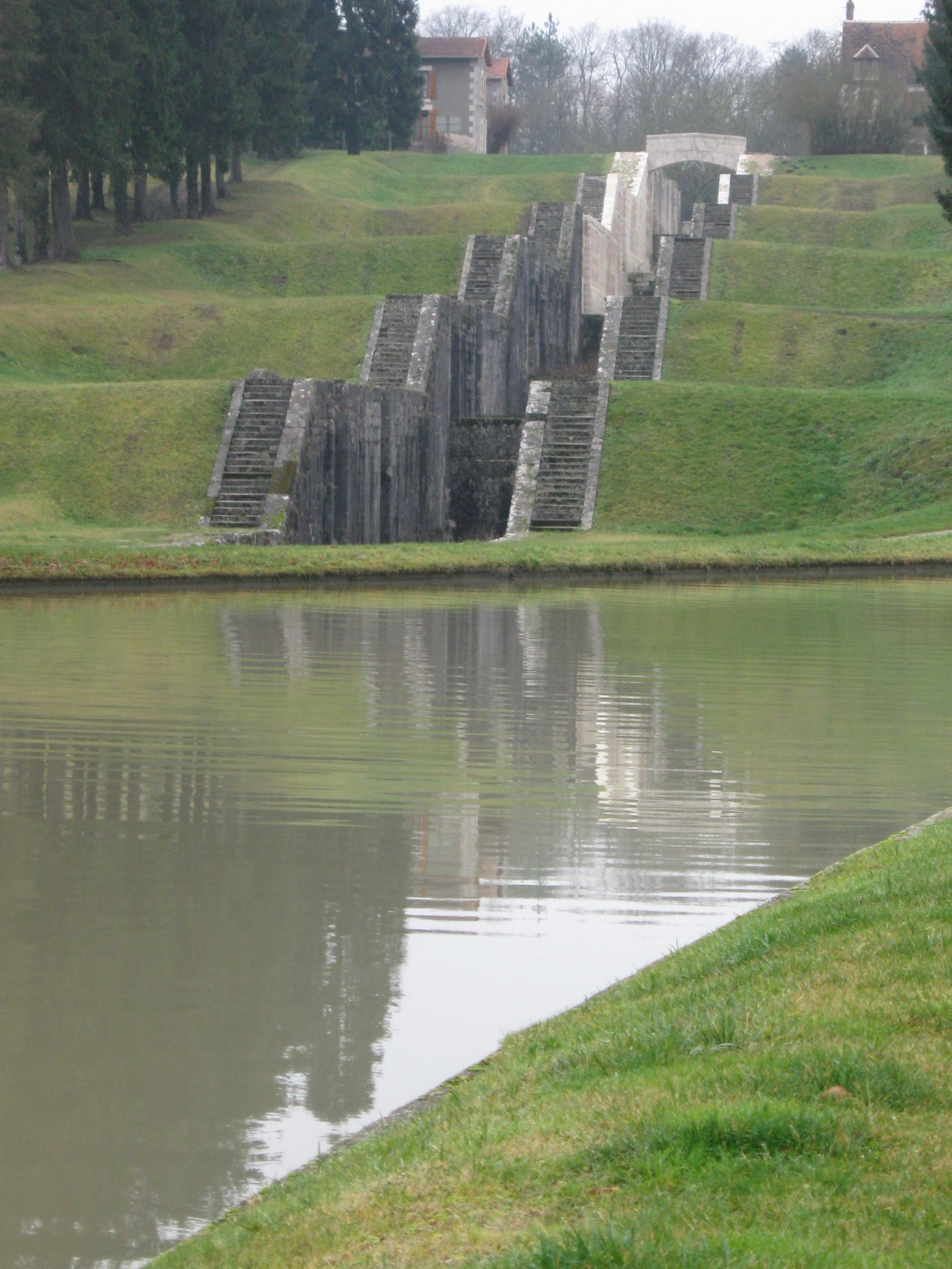
The seven locks of Rogny-les-Sept-Écluses on the Briare Canal, early 17th century

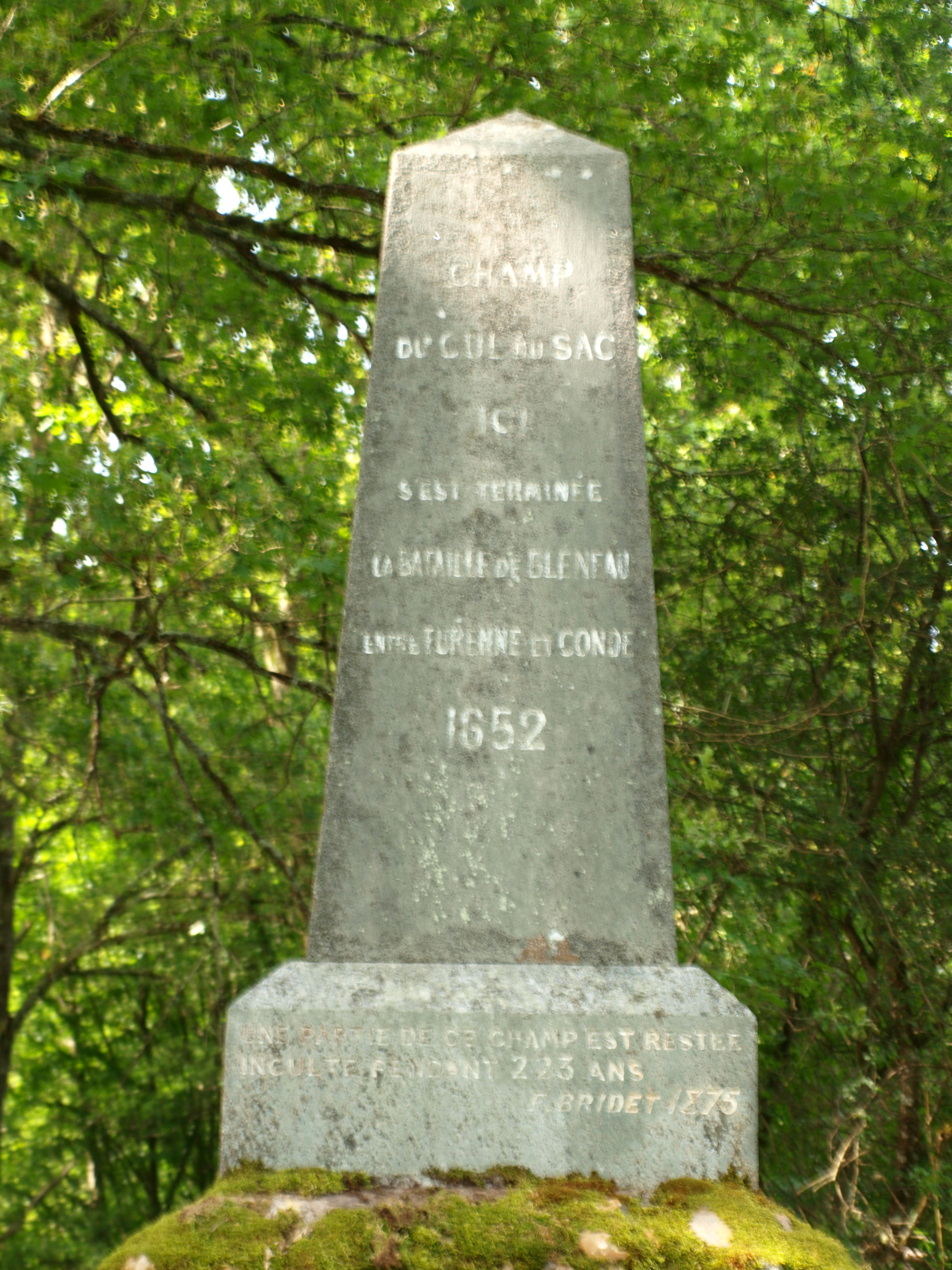
Memorial of the Battle of Bléneau (1652), erected in 1875

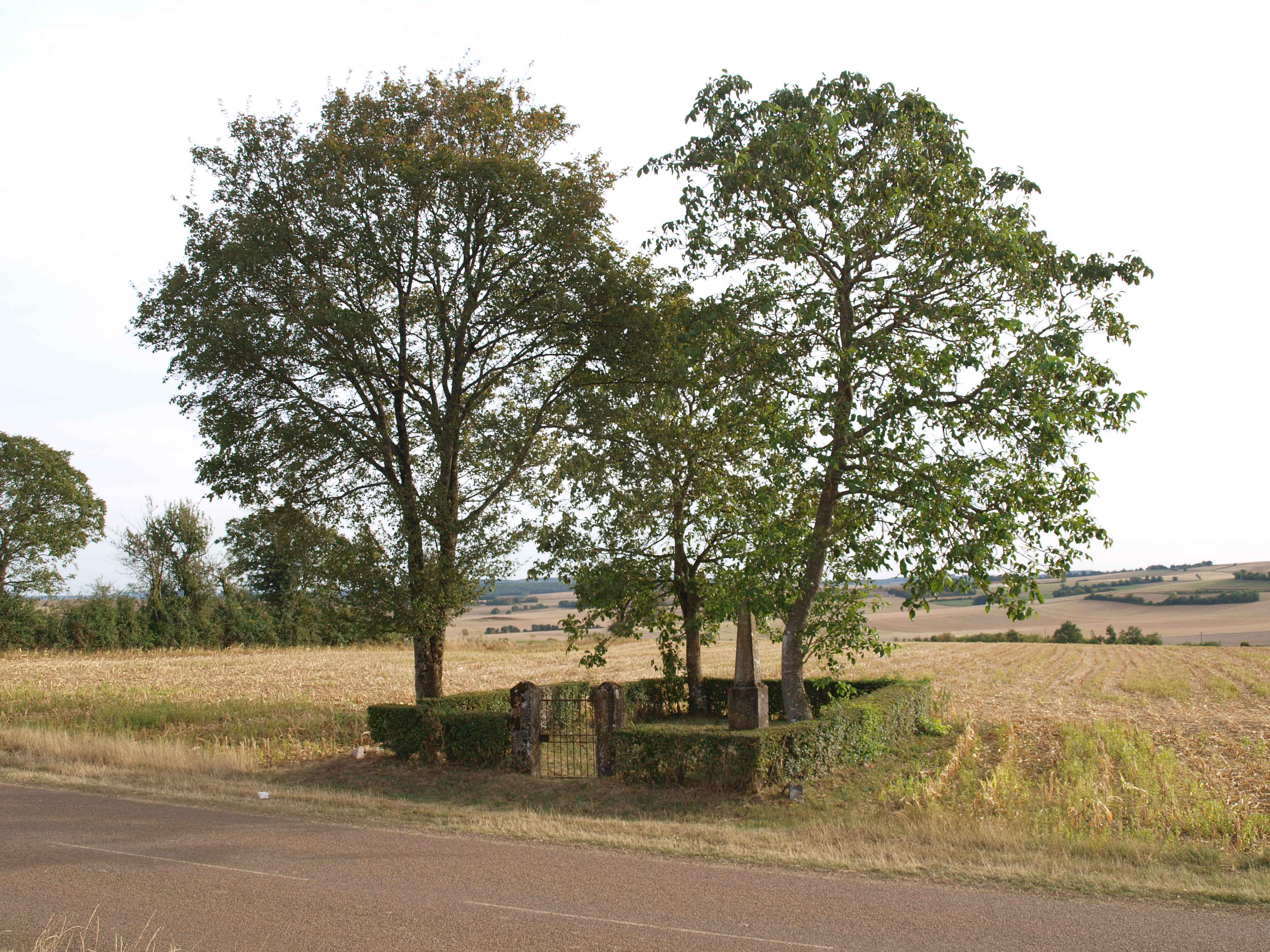
Tomb of Alfred Saison, opponent of the 1851 coup d'état, in Saints-en-Puisaye

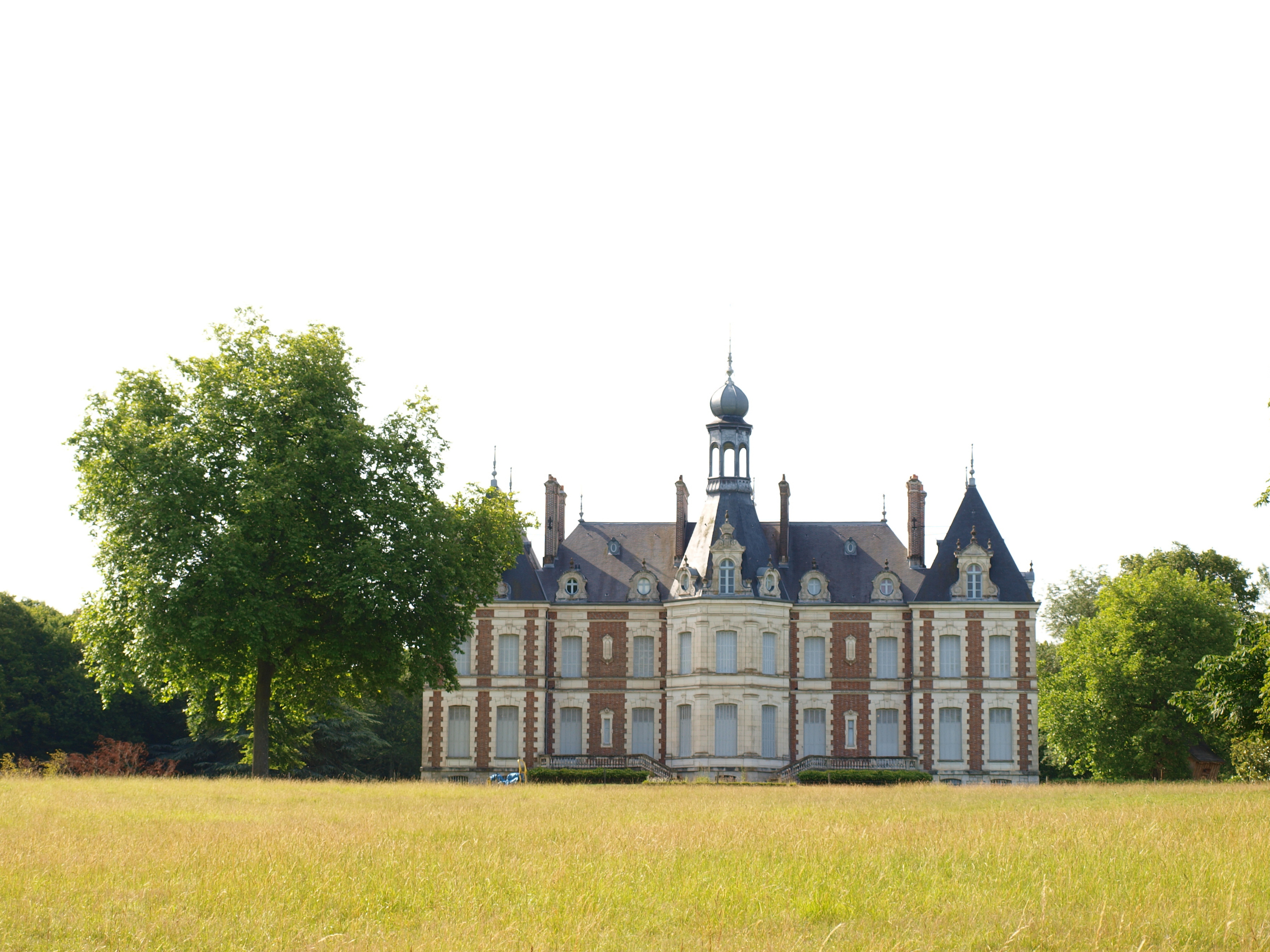
Château du Muguet in Breteau, June 1940 Anglo-French Supreme War Council venue

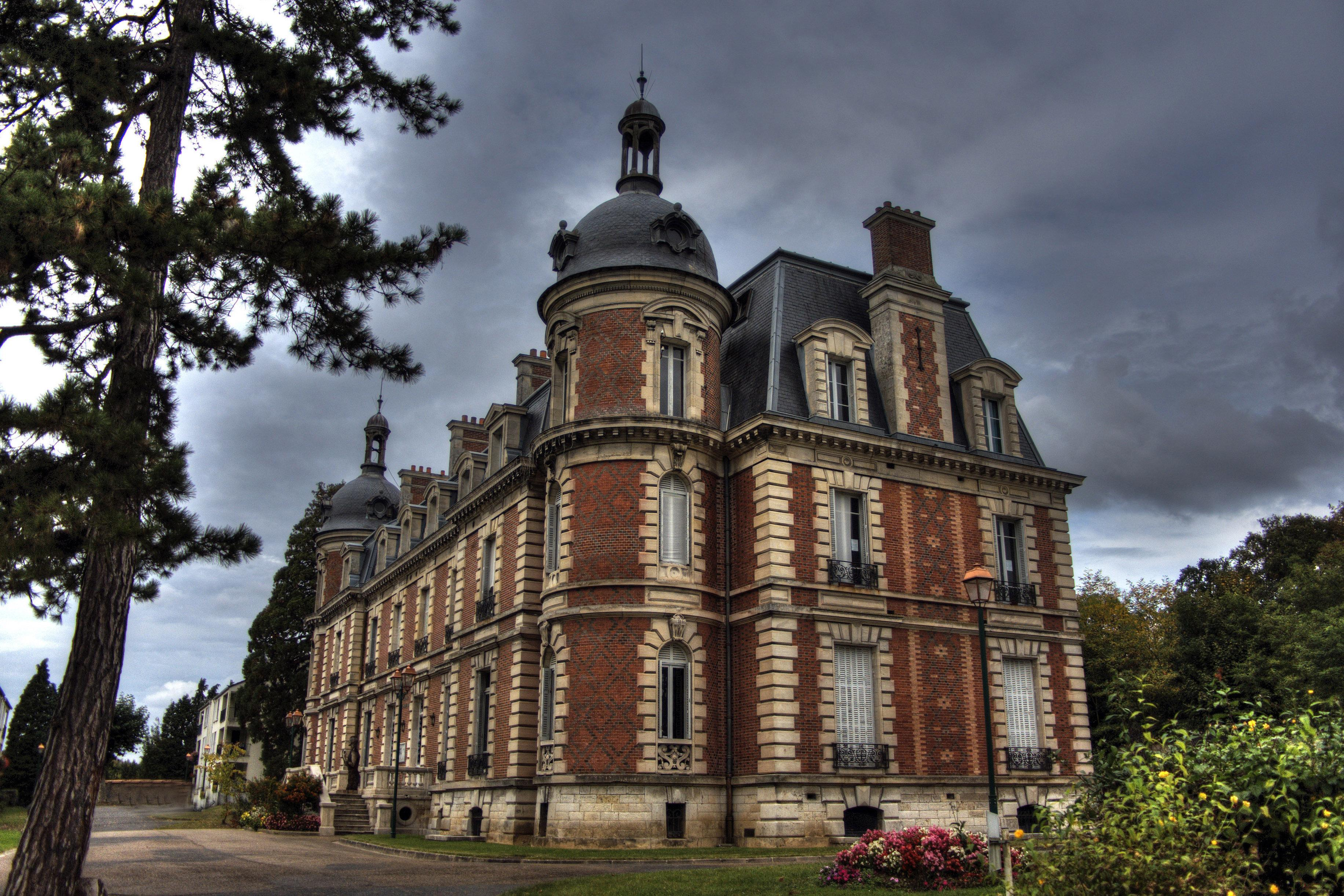
Château de Trousse-Barrière in Briare, built in the late 1880s

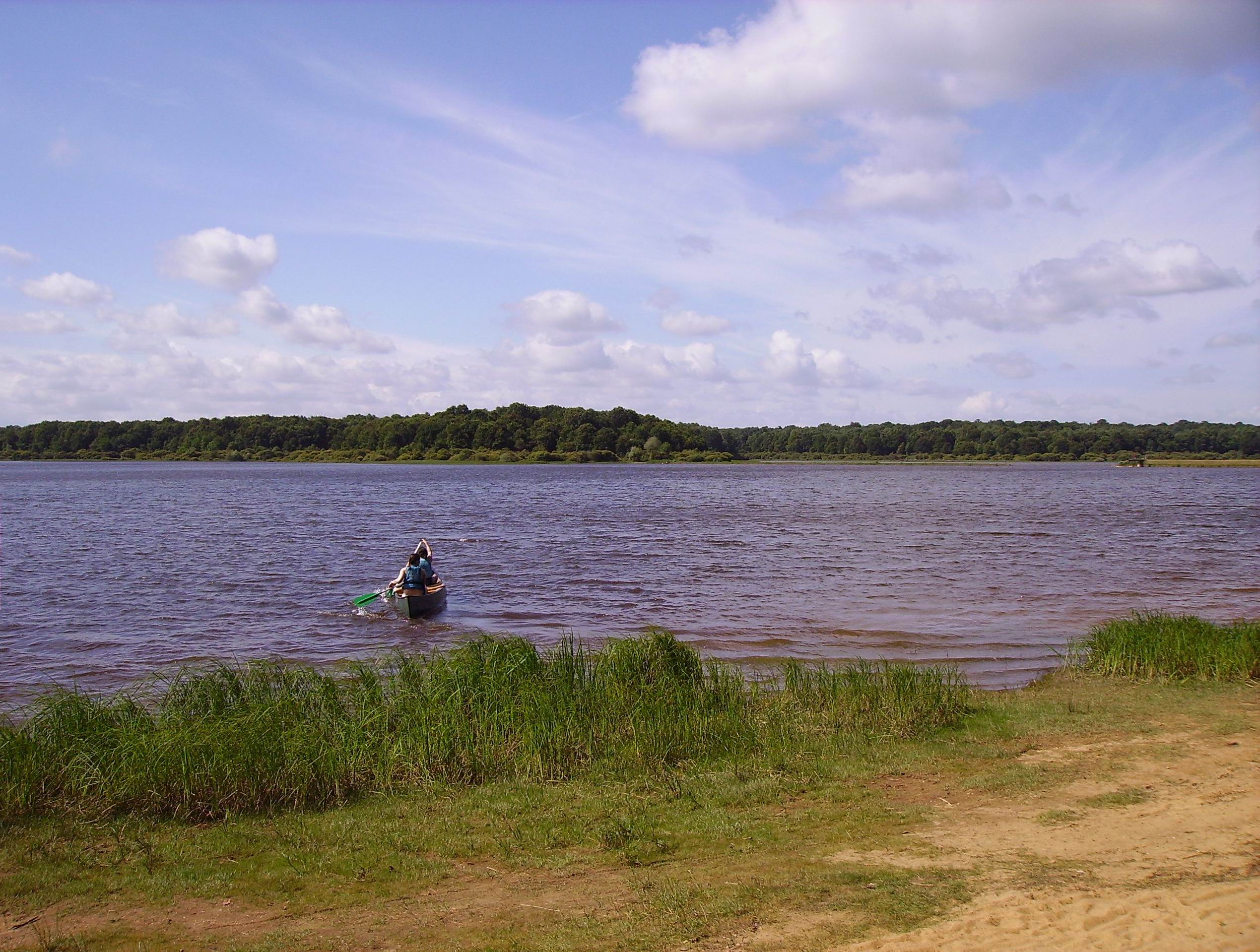
Reservoir of Bourdon

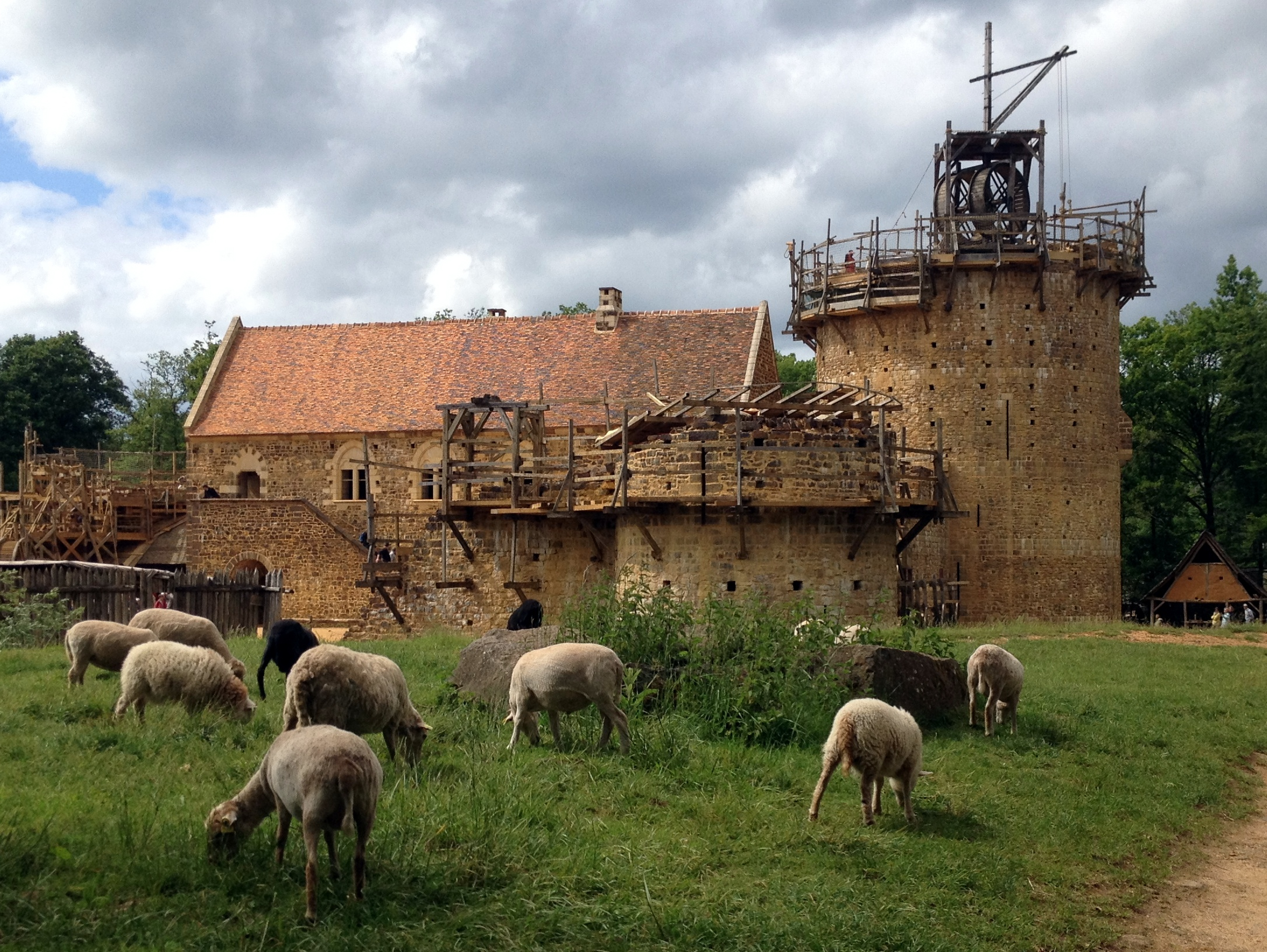
Castle construction at Guédelon

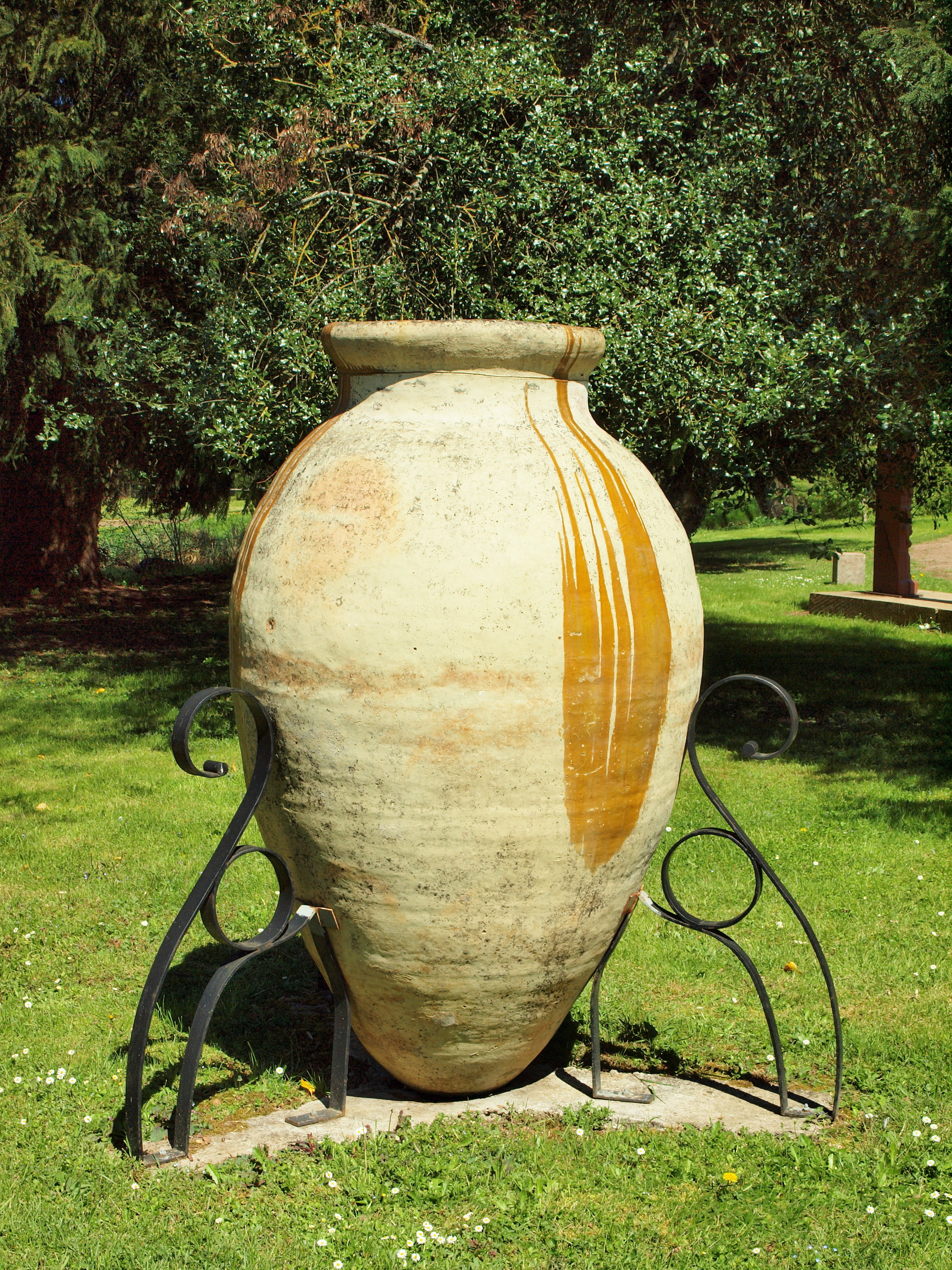
Stoneware (grès de Puisaye) in Saint-Amand-en-Puisaye
