= Hisao Takahashi =

Japanese painter (1936–2024)

- 高橋久雄
- Born: 10 July 1936; Saitama, Japan
- Died: 21 February 2024 (aged 87)
- Education: Musashino Art University; École nationale supérieure des arts décoratifs
- Occupation: Painter

Hisao Takahashi (Japanese: 高橋久雄 Takahashi Hisao; 10 July 1936 – 21 February 2024) was a Japanese painter.

== Biography ==
Born in Saitama on 10 July 1936, Takahashi graduated from Musashino Art University in 1966 and from the École nationale supérieure des arts décoratifs in 1970. In 1981, he painted murals at the International Centre for the Study of the Preservation and Restoration of Cultural Property in Rome.

In 1982, Takahashi set up a fresco restoration practice, restoring frescoes in the likes of the Hospices de Beaune, Dijon Cathedral, Autun Cathedral, and the Église de Moutiers-en-Puisaye. In 1997, he bought the Tour des Ursulines and founded the Centre International de la Tour des Ursulines, promoting Franco-Japanese friendship.

Hisao Takahashi died on 21 February 2024, at the age of 87.

== Publications ==
- Hisao Takahashi: The Medieval Wall Paintings of Macedonia (1989)
