= Saint-Sauveur-en-Puisaye =

- Commune
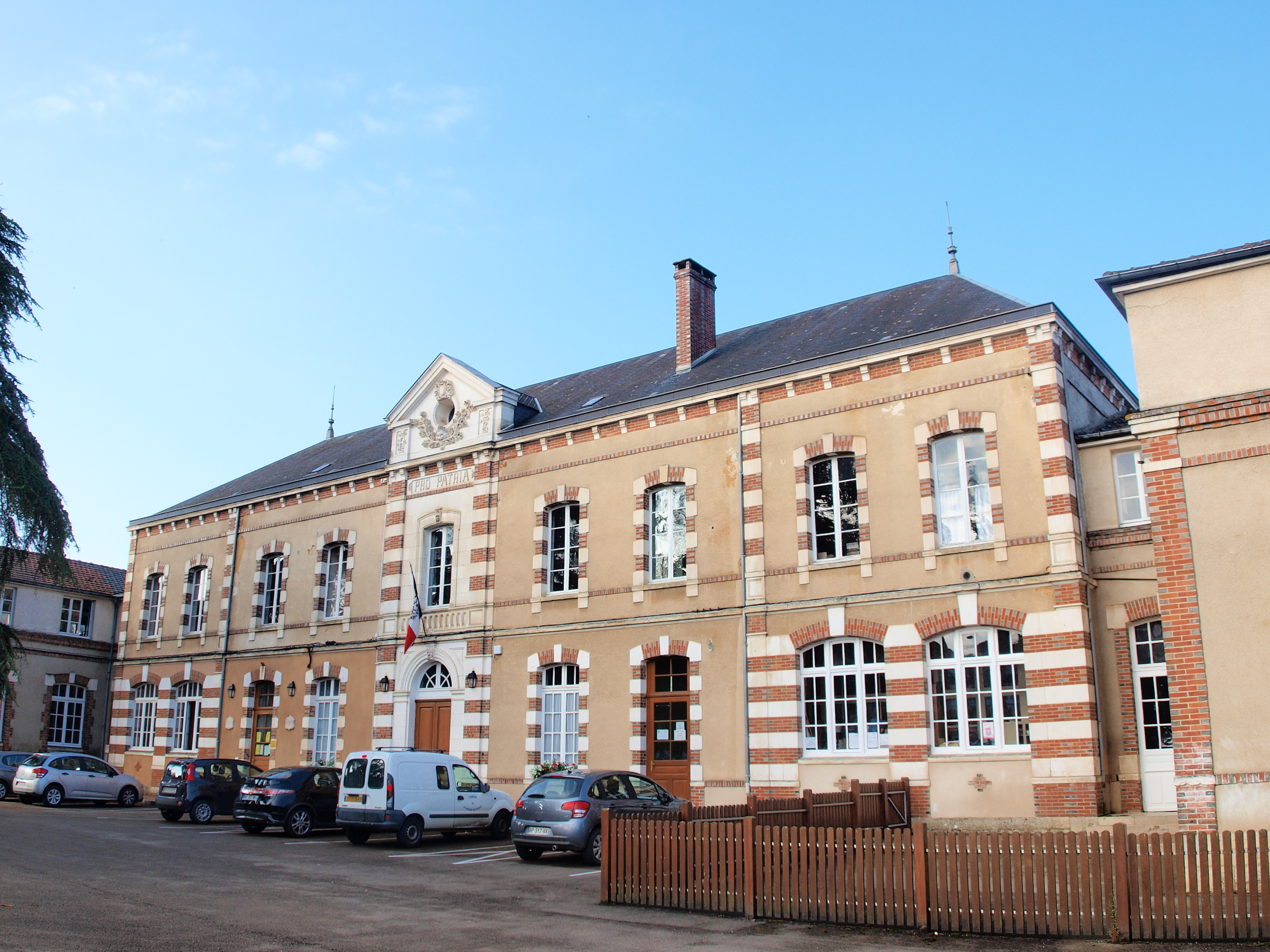
- The town hall in Saint-Sauveur-en-Puisaye

- Coat of arms
- Location of Saint-Sauveur-en-Puisaye
- Location within France Location within Bourgogne-Franche-Comté
- Coordinates: 47°37′09″N 3°11′52″E
- Country: France
- Region: Bourgogne-Franche-Comté
- Department: Yonne
- Arrondissement: Auxerre
- Canton: Vincelles

Government
  - Mayor (2020–2026): Yohann Corde
- Area^{1}: 30.89 km^{2} (11.93 sq mi)
- Highest elevation: 311 m (1,020 ft)
- Lowest elevation: 212 m (696 ft)
- Population (2023): 905
  - Density: 29.3/km^{2} (75.9/sq mi)
- Time zone: UTC+01:00 (CET)
  - Summer (DST): UTC+02:00 (CEST)
- INSEE/Postal code: 89368 /89520
- ^{1} French Land Register data, which excludes lakes, ponds, glaciers > 1 km^{2} (0.386 sq mi or 247 acres) and river estuaries.

Saint-Sauveur-en-Puisaye (French pronunciation: [sɛ̃ sovœʁ ɑ̃ pɥizɛ]) is a commune in the north-central French department of Yonne. It is located in an area historically known as Puisaye.

In the early 1970s the Château de la Folie, north of the village (halfway to Mézilles), was home to one of the "Maharishi's Science of Creative Intelligence" projects. Transcendental Meditation teachers and students from all over the world gathered here to renovate the buildings and make the château a meditation centre. There were plans to make a campus with meditation-units in the fields between the château and the Etang de la Folie, just beside the D7 road. The project was abandoned in the mid-seventies, for reasons unknown.

== Personalities ==
It is the birthplace of the writer Colette. A museum dedicated to her life and work is housed in the château in the village centre.

== See also ==
- Communes of the Yonne department
