= Saint-Vérain =

- Commune
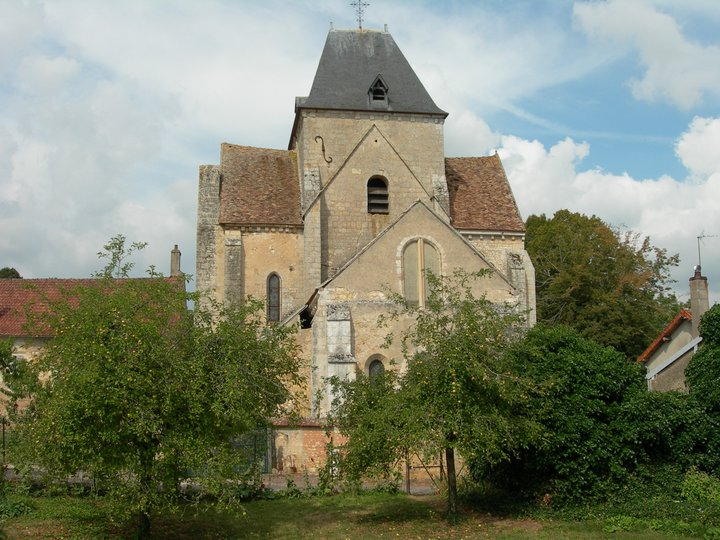
- The church in Saint-Vérain

- Coat of arms
- Location of Saint-Vérain
- Location within France Location within Bourgogne-Franche-Comté
- Coordinates: 47°28′54″N 3°03′24″E
- Country: France
- Region: Bourgogne-Franche-Comté
- Department: Nièvre
- Arrondissement: Cosne-Cours-sur-Loire
- Canton: Pouilly-sur-Loire
- Intercommunality: CC Puisaye-Forterre

Government
  - Mayor (2020–2026): Jean-Luc Chevalier
- Area^{1}: 24.69 km^{2} (9.53 sq mi)
- Highest elevation: 312 m (1,024 ft)
- Lowest elevation: 184 m (604 ft)
- Population (2023): 349
  - Density: 14.1/km^{2} (36.6/sq mi)
- Time zone: UTC+01:00 (CET)
  - Summer (DST): UTC+02:00 (CEST)
- INSEE/Postal code: 58270 /58310
- ^{1} French Land Register data, which excludes lakes, ponds, glaciers > 1 km^{2} (0.386 sq mi or 247 acres) and river estuaries.

Saint-Vérain (French pronunciation: [sɛ̃ veʁɛ̃]) is a commune in the Nièvre department in central France, in the historical region of Puisaye.

== See also ==
- Communes of the Nièvre department
