= Saint-Amand-en-Puisaye =

- Commune
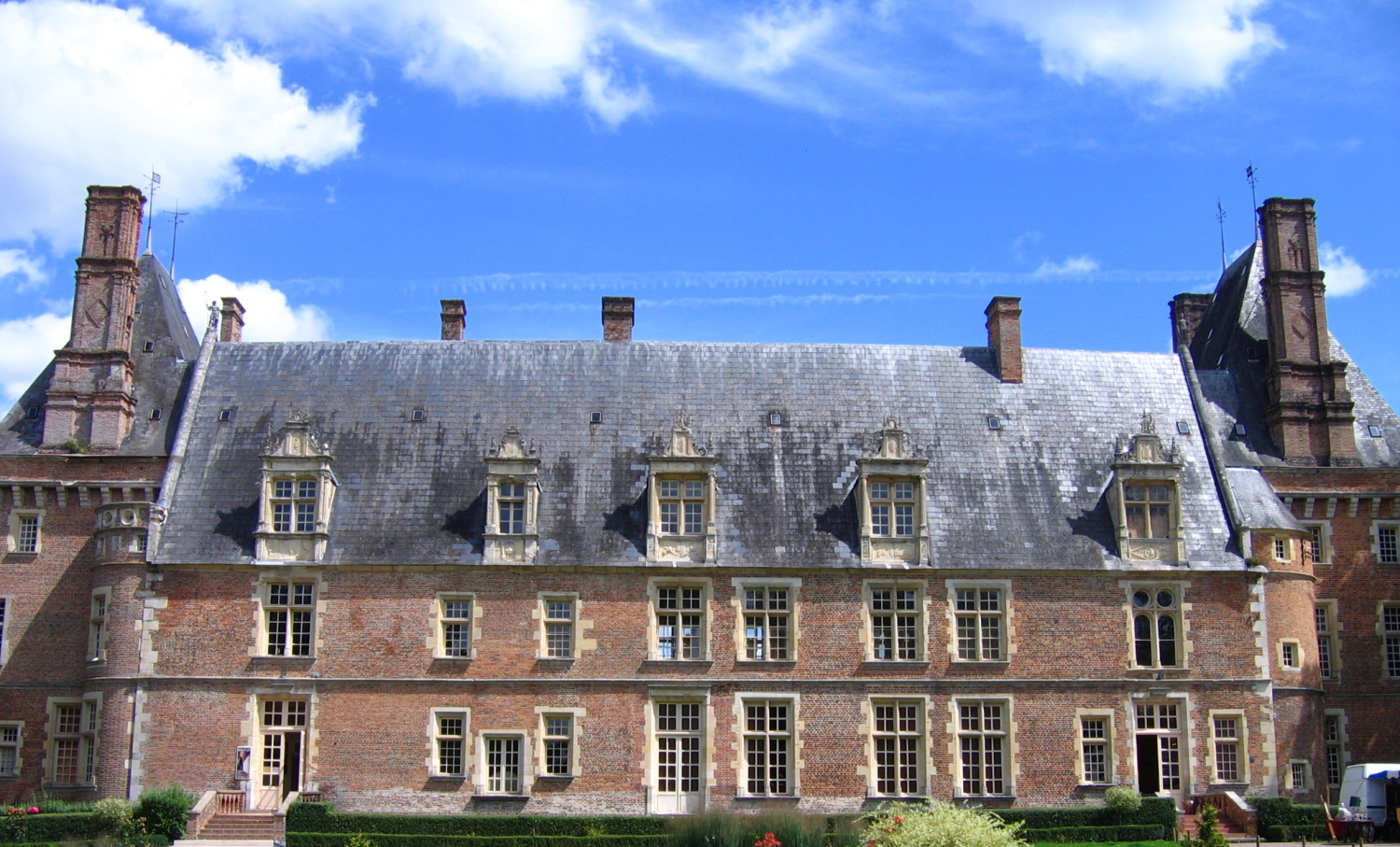
- Château de Saint-Armand

- Coat of arms
- Location of Saint-Amand-en-Puisaye
- Location within France Location within Bourgogne-Franche-Comté
- Coordinates: 47°31′47″N 3°04′31″E
- Country: France
- Region: Bourgogne-Franche-Comté
- Department: Nièvre
- Arrondissement: Cosne-Cours-sur-Loire
- Canton: Pouilly-sur-Loire
- Intercommunality: CC Puisaye-Forterre

Government
  - Mayor (2020–2026): Gilles Reverdy
- Area^{1}: 41.51 km^{2} (16.03 sq mi)
- Highest elevation: 284 m (932 ft)
- Lowest elevation: 167 m (548 ft)
- Population (2023): 1,216
  - Density: 29.29/km^{2} (75.87/sq mi)
- Time zone: UTC+01:00 (CET)
  - Summer (DST): UTC+02:00 (CEST)
- INSEE/Postal code: 58227 /58310
- ^{1} French Land Register data, which excludes lakes, ponds, glaciers > 1 km^{2} (0.386 sq mi or 247 acres) and river estuaries.

Saint-Amand-en-Puisaye (French pronunciation: [sɛ̃.t‿amɑ̃ ɑ̃ pɥizɛ], literally Saint-Amand in Puisaye) is a commune in the Nièvre department in central France. Its sights include the Château de Saint-Amand-en-Puisaye, a representative work of French Renaissance architecture.

== See also ==
- Communes of the Nièvre department
