= Toucy =

- Commune
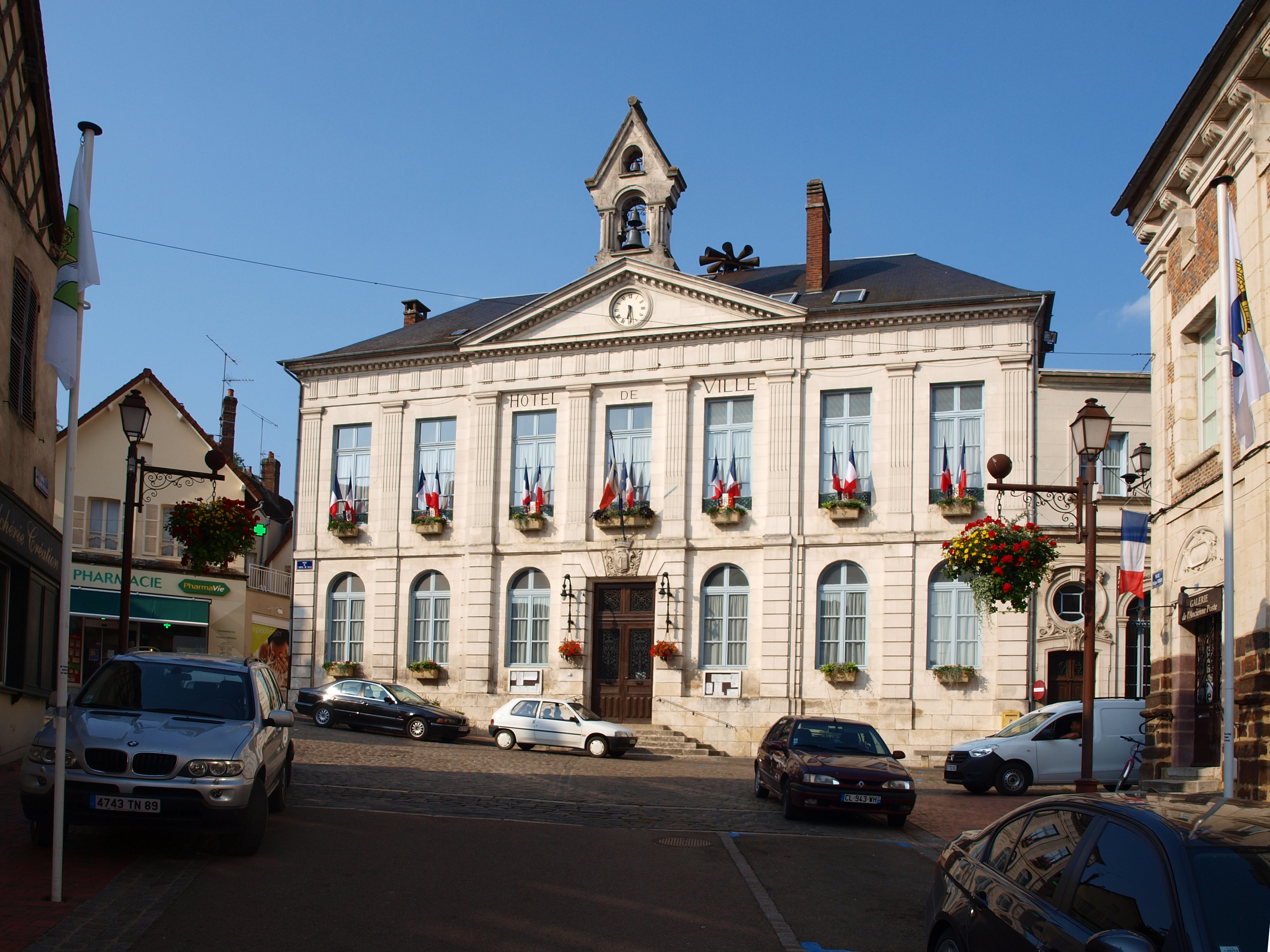
- The town hall in Toucy

- Coat of arms
- Location of Toucy
- Location within France Location within Bourgogne-Franche-Comté
- Coordinates: 47°44′14″N 3°17′39″E
- Country: France
- Region: Bourgogne-Franche-Comté
- Department: Yonne
- Arrondissement: Auxerre
- Canton: Cœur de Puisaye

Government
  - Mayor (2020–2026): Michel Kotovtchikhine
- Area^{1}: 34.85 km^{2} (13.46 sq mi)
- Highest elevation: 306 m (1,004 ft)
- Lowest elevation: 177 m (581 ft)
- Population (2023): 2,571
  - Density: 73.77/km^{2} (191.1/sq mi)
- Time zone: UTC+01:00 (CET)
  - Summer (DST): UTC+02:00 (CEST)
- INSEE/Postal code: 89419 /89130
- ^{1} French Land Register data, which excludes lakes, ponds, glaciers > 1 km^{2} (0.386 sq mi or 247 acres) and river estuaries.

Toucy (French pronunciation: [tusi]) is a commune in the Yonne department in Bourgogne-Franche-Comté in north-central France, in the historical region of Puisaye.

== Personalities ==
John Law purchased the estate of Toucy from the Duchess of Ventadour on 26 August 1719, even though there is no evidence he ever resided there. This estate was centered on the town's castle known as château de la Motte-Miton, and allowed Law to go by the title Marquis de Toucy. Law lost the property in 1720 following the collapse of his system.

Toucy was the birthplace and hometown of Pierre Larousse, lexicographer and founder of the publishing house that would later produce one of the most highly popular French dictionaries, Le Petit Larousse.

Léon Noël, French diplomat, politician and historian, died there in his domain in 1987.

== Geography ==
The town lies in the middle of the commune, on the right bank of the river Ouanne, which flows northwest through the commune.

== Population ==
Historical population
Year	Pop.	±% p.a.
1968	2,505	—
1975	2,584	+0.44%
1982	2,665	+0.44%
1990	2,590	−0.36%
1999	2,602	+0.05%
2007	2,672	+0.33%
2012	2,687	+0.11%
2017	2,662	−0.19%
2023	2,571	−0.58%
Source: INSEE

== See also ==
- Communes of the Yonne department
