= Saints-en-Puisaye =

- Commune
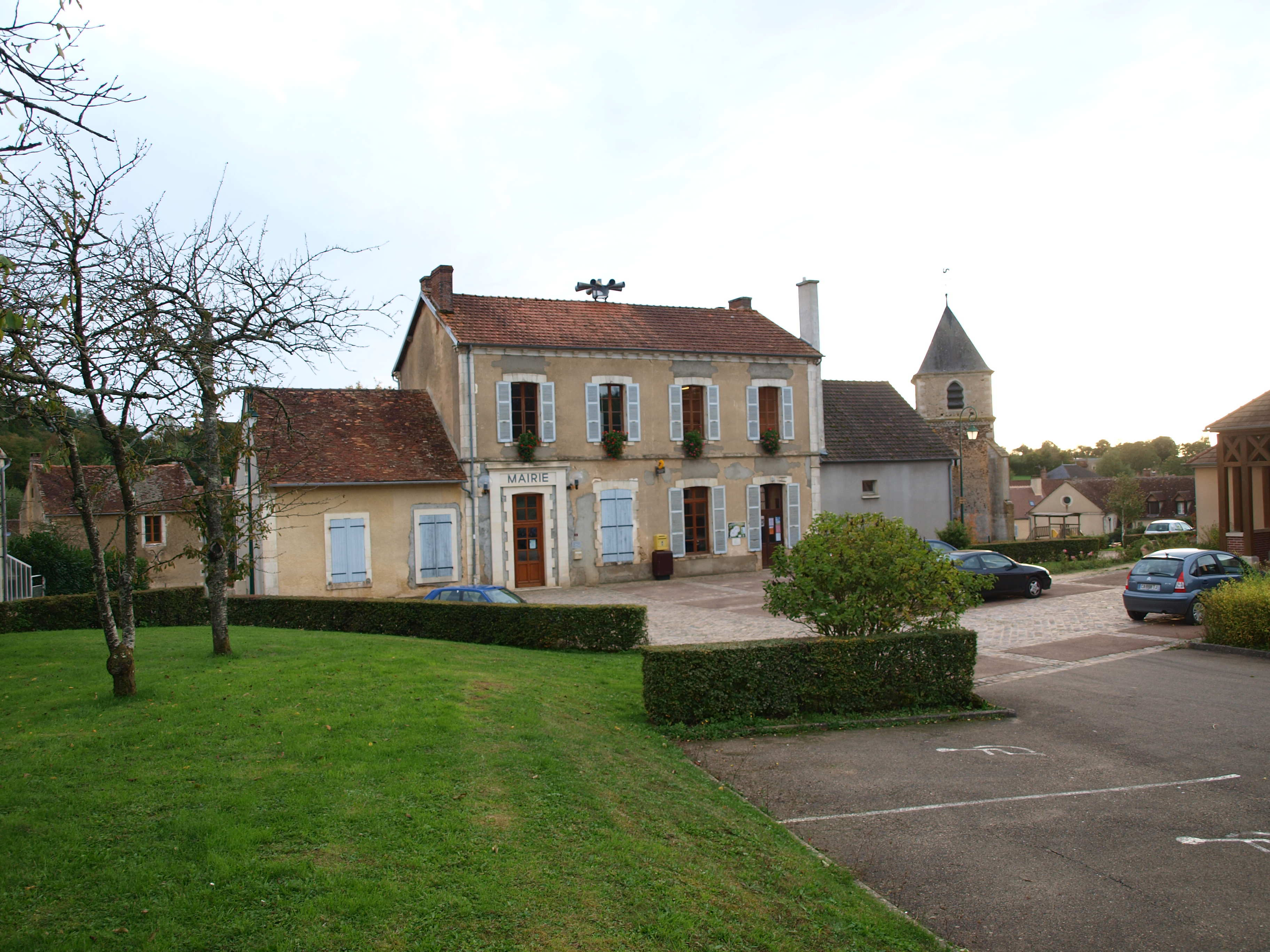
- The town hall in Saints-en-Puisaye
- Location of Saints-en-Puisaye
- Location within France Location within Bourgogne-Franche-Comté
- Coordinates: 47°37′18″N 3°15′44″E
- Country: France
- Region: Bourgogne-Franche-Comté
- Department: Yonne
- Arrondissement: Auxerre
- Canton: Vincelles

Government
  - Mayor (2020–2026): Jean Massé
- Area^{1}: 27.71 km^{2} (10.70 sq mi)
- Highest elevation: 325 m (1,066 ft)
- Lowest elevation: 216 m (709 ft)
- Population (2023): 548
  - Density: 19.8/km^{2} (51.2/sq mi)
- Time zone: UTC+01:00 (CET)
  - Summer (DST): UTC+02:00 (CEST)
- INSEE/Postal code: 89367 /89520
- ^{1} French Land Register data, which excludes lakes, ponds, glaciers > 1 km^{2} (0.386 sq mi or 247 acres) and river estuaries.

Saints-en-Puisaye (French pronunciation: [sɛ̃ ɑ̃ pɥizɛ], literally Saints in Puisaye), formerly Saints, is a commune in the Yonne department in Bourgogne-Franche-Comté in north-central France.

== See also ==
- Communes of the Yonne department
