= Château de Saint-Amand-en-Puisaye =

Castle in Bourgogne-Franche-Comté, France

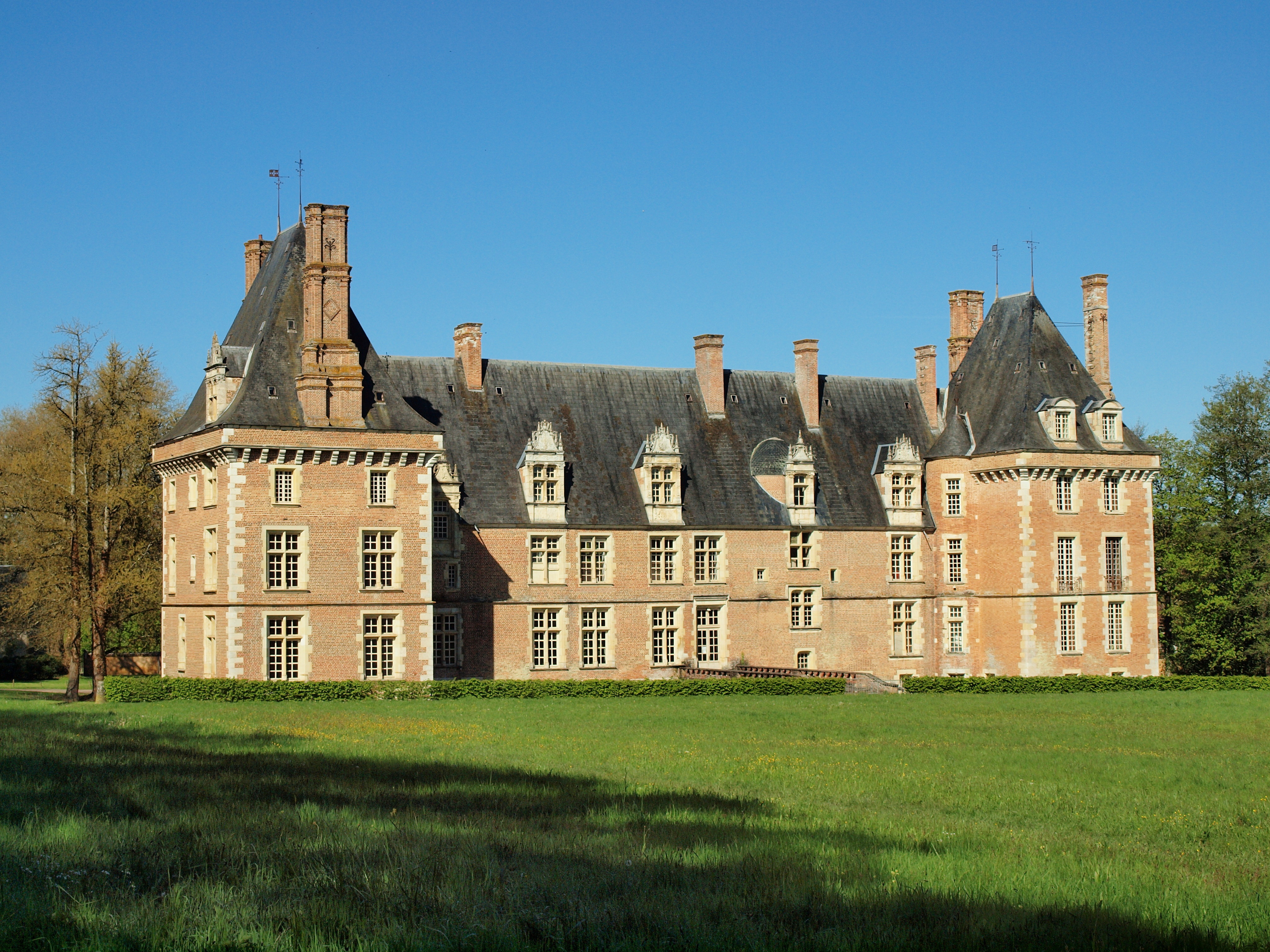
- View from the park
- Interactive map of the Château de Saint-Amand-en-Puisaye area

General information
- Architectural style: French Renaissance
- Location: Saint-Amand-en-Puisaye, France
- Coordinates: 47°31′54″N 3°04′26″E
- Current tenants: Musée du Grès

The Château de Saint-Amand-en-Puisaye is a Renaissance castle built in the 1530s in the Burgundian town of Saint-Amand-en-Puisaye. It was designated a French Monument historique on 28 November 1991.

== History ==
The castle was built in the 1530s by Antoine de Rochechouart (c. 1488–1544), a scion of the ancient House of Rochechouart. In addition to being lord of Saint-Amand-en-Puisaye, he was Seneschal of Toulouse and Albigeois and Lieutenant-General of Languedoc, Governor of Lomagne and of Rivière-Verdun. He was a significant military figure of the time, participated in the defense of Marseilles in 1536, and died of his wounds at the Battle of Ceresole.

After the death of Antoine's widow in 1560, the castle was successively held by several noble families as lords of Saint-Amand. In 1659 the lordship (including the castle) was purchased by Cardinal Mazarin, together with the much larger Duchy of Nevers. Noble Léonard Guyot de Montchougny then acquired it in 1710, and the castle remained in the property of his descendants until 1896. Later owners included a Swedish aristocrat, Count Nils de Brack, a painter and stoneware artist (1926–1930); and Jules Guiraud, a deputy governor of the Banque de France (1935–1947). It was purchased by the town of Saint-Amand in October 1985.

== Architecture ==
The castle is representative of the French Renaissance architecture of the reign of Francis I. Its ornate dormer windows (lucarnes) are particularly noteworthy. Interior features include a grand staircase, a chapel, and a kitchen.

== Stoneware Museum ==
The Musée du Grès inside the castle displays local production of stoneware (grès in French), for which Saint-Amand and the surrounding region of Puisaye are renowned, including works of Jean-Joseph Carriès who had a workshop in the town.
