= Jean-Baptiste Robineau-Desvoidy =

French physician and entomologist

André Jean Baptiste Robineau-Desvoidy
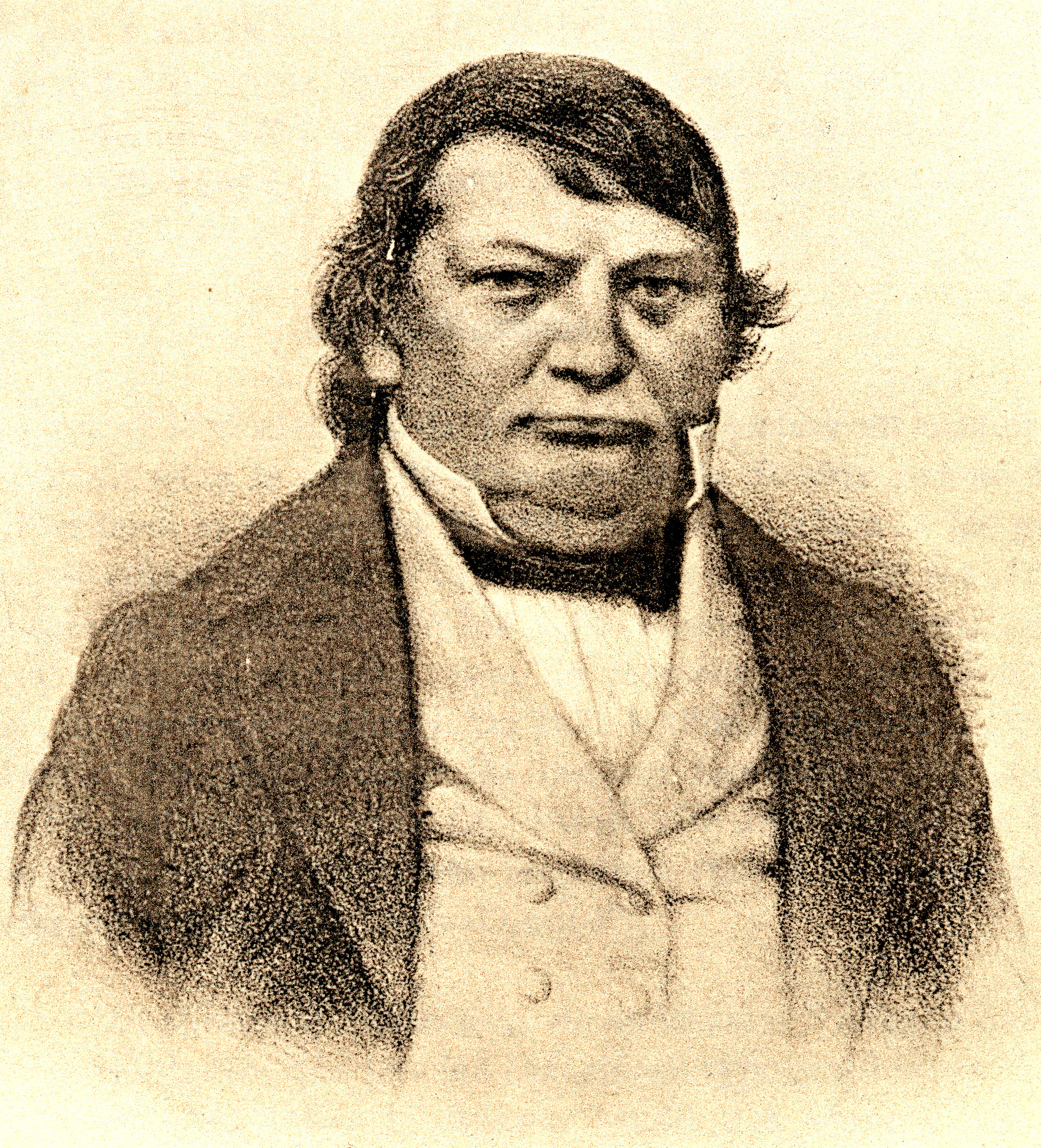
- Born: 1 January 1799; Saint-Sauveur-en-Puisaye, France
- Died: 25 June 1857 (aged 58); Paris, France

André Jean Baptiste Robineau-Desvoidy (1 January 1799 in Saint-Sauveur-en-Puisaye – 25 June 1857 in Paris) was a French medical doctor and entomologist specialising in the study of Diptera (flies), and to some extent of the Coleoptera (beetles).

== Flies named ==
- Brachyopa scutellaris 1843 - Syrphidae
- Calliphora vicina 1830 - Calliphoridae
- Thecopohora fulvipes 1830 - Conopidae
- Genus Morellia and species Morellia aenescens 1830- Muscidae
- Genus Azelia and species Azelia nebulosa Robineau-Desvoidy, 1830
- Genus Hydromyia 1830 Sciomyzidae
- Genus Herina 1830- Ulidiidae
- Genus Sphenella 1830- Tephritidae
- Genus Delia 1830-Anthomyidae
- Genus Bengalia 1830- Calliphoridae
- Genus Rutilia 1830- Tachinidae
- Genus Muscina and species fungivora 1830- Muscidae

== Works ==
(Selected)

- Essai sur la tribu des culicides. Mém. Soc. Hist. Nat. Paris 3: 390-413 (1827).
- Essai sur les myodaires. Mém. Pres. Div. Sav. Acad. R. Sci. Inst. Fr. 2(2), 813 p. (1830).
- Notice sur le genre fucellie, Fucellia, R.D., et en particulier sur le Fucellia arenaria. Ann. Soc. Entomol. Fr. 10: 269–72. (1842).
- Myodaires des environs de Paris [part]. Ann. Soc. Entomol. Fr. (2) 6: 429–77. (1849).This paper forms part of a series, though the first part had the title "Études sur les myodaires des environs de Paris." The parts are as follows: Ann. Soc. Entomol. Fr. (2) 2: 5-38 (1844); (2) 4: 17-38 (1846); (2) 5: 255-87 (1847); (2) 6: 429-77 (1849); (2) 8: 183-209 (1850); (2) 9: 177–90, 305-21 (1851).
- Mémoire of M. Léon Dufour donne la description de la larve et des moeurs d'une muscide, larve qui vit du sang de petites hirondelles. Bull. Soc. Entomol. Fr. (2) 7: iv-v. (1849)
- Description d'agromyzes et de phytomyzes écloses chez M. le colonel Goureau. Rev. Mag. Zool. (2) 3: 391–405. (1851)
- Diptères des environs de Paris. Famille des myopaires. Bull. Soc. Sci. Hist. Nat. L'Yonne 7: 83–160. (1853).
- Histoire naturelle des diptères des environs de Paris. Oeuvre posthume du Dr Robineau-Desvoidy. Publiée par les soins de sa famille, sous la direction de M.H. Monceaux.2 vols. Masson et Fils, Paris. 1500p. (1863)

== Collection ==
The collection of Robineau-Desvoidy was largely destroyed. Some remains in the Muséum National d'Histoire Naturelle, Paris and there are some specimens from it in the Hope Department of Entomology of the University Museum, Oxford.
