= Lac du Bourdon =

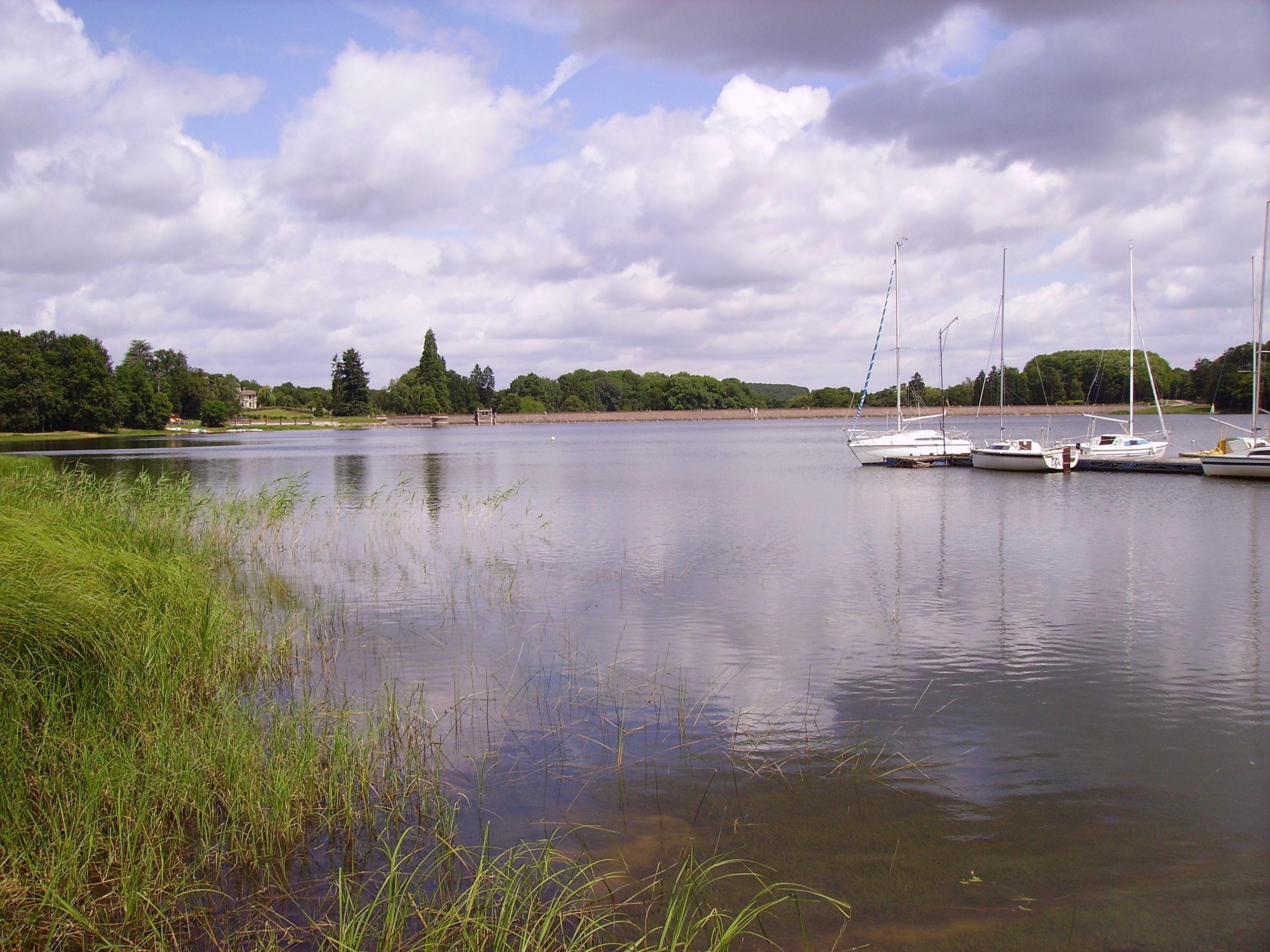

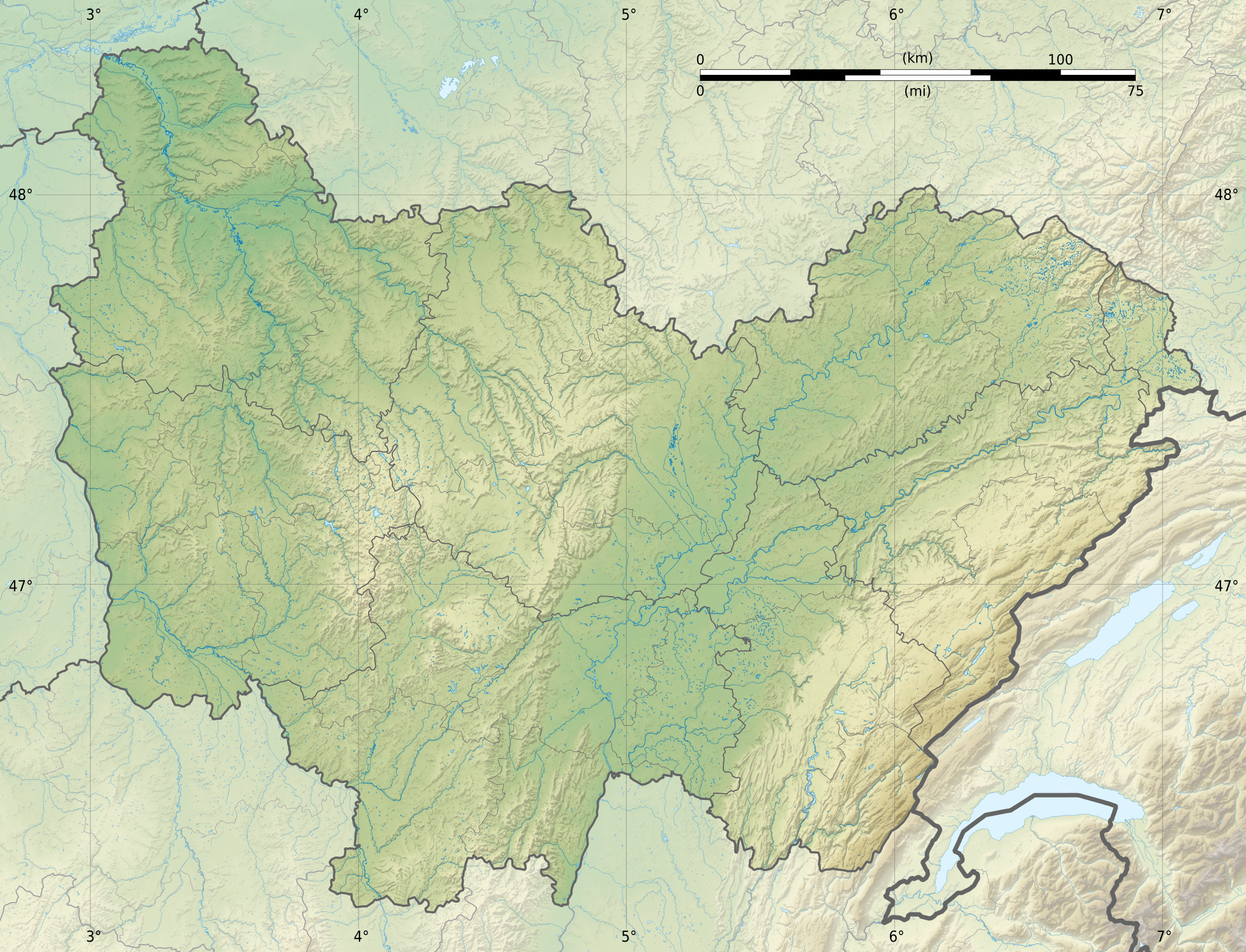
- Location within Bourgogne-Franche-Comté
- Location: Bourgogne-Franche-Comté
- Coordinates: 47°36′23.44″N 3°6′25.46″E
- Type: artificial
- Primary inflows: Bourdon
- Primary outflows: Bourdon
- Basin countries: France
- Max. length: 3 km (1.9 mi)
- Max. width: 0.5 km (0.31 mi)
- Surface area: 2.2 km^{2} (0.85 sq mi)
- Max. depth: 15 m (49 ft)
- Water volume: 9,300,000 m^{3} (330,000,000 cu ft)
- Surface elevation: 215 m (705 ft)

Lac du Bourdon is a lake in Bourgogne-Franche-Comté, France. At an elevation of 215 m, its surface area is 2.2 km^{2}.
