= Mézilles =

- Commune
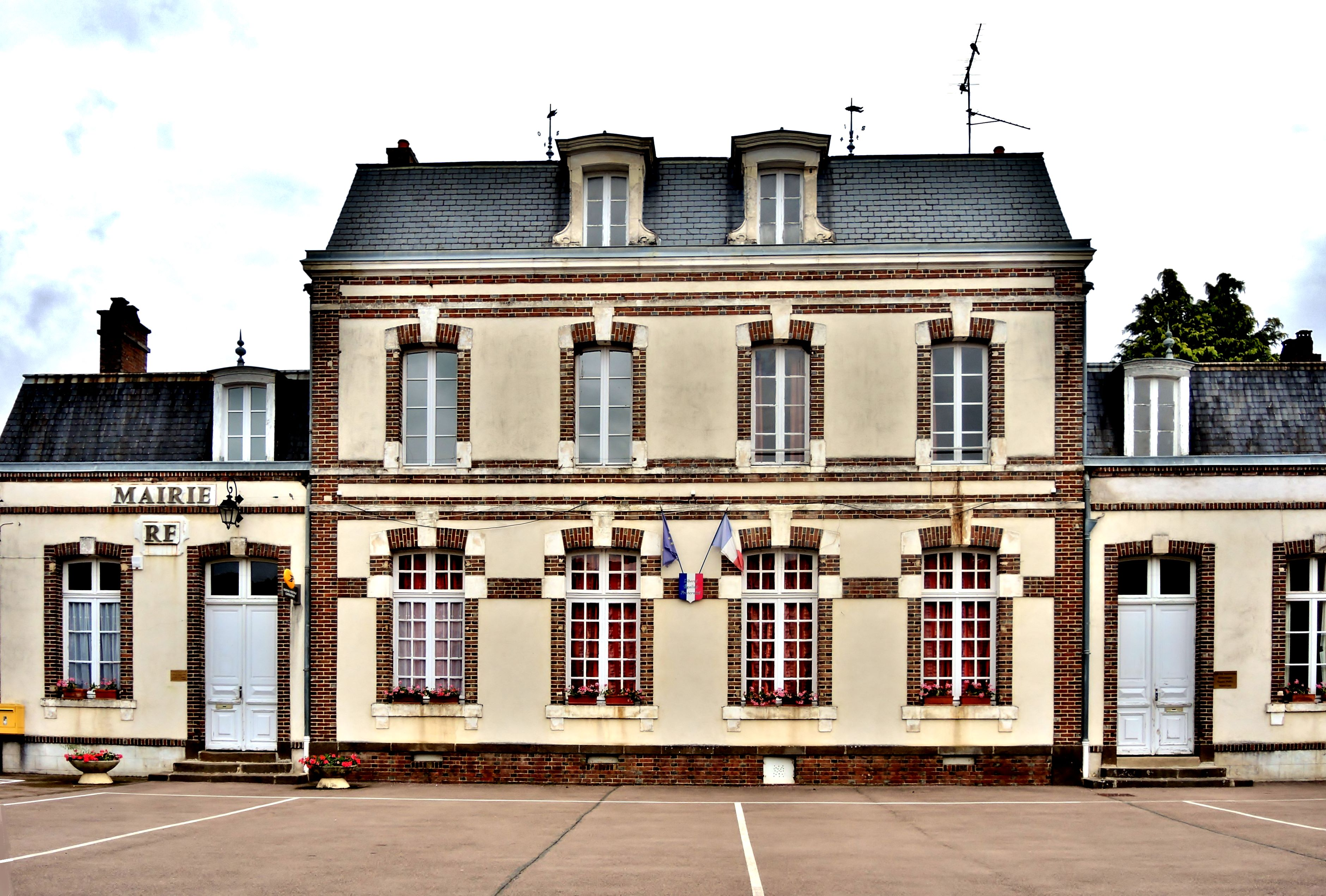
- The town hall in Mézilles
- Location of Mézilles
- Location within France Location within Bourgogne-Franche-Comté
- Coordinates: 47°42′06″N 3°10′27″E
- Country: France
- Region: Bourgogne-Franche-Comté
- Department: Yonne
- Arrondissement: Auxerre
- Canton: Cœur de Puisaye

Government
  - Mayor (2023–2026): Michel Carré
- Area^{1}: 52.42 km^{2} (20.24 sq mi)
- Highest elevation: 286 m (938 ft)
- Lowest elevation: 191 m (627 ft)
- Population (2023): 520
  - Density: 9.9/km^{2} (26/sq mi)
- Time zone: UTC+01:00 (CET)
  - Summer (DST): UTC+02:00 (CEST)
- INSEE/Postal code: 89254 /89130
- ^{1} French Land Register data, which excludes lakes, ponds, glaciers > 1 km^{2} (0.386 sq mi or 247 acres) and river estuaries.

Mézilles (French pronunciation: [mezij]) is a commune in the Yonne department in Bourgogne-Franche-Comté in north-central France, in the historical region of Puisaye.

== See also ==
- Communes of the Yonne department
