= Moutiers-en-Puisaye =

- Commune
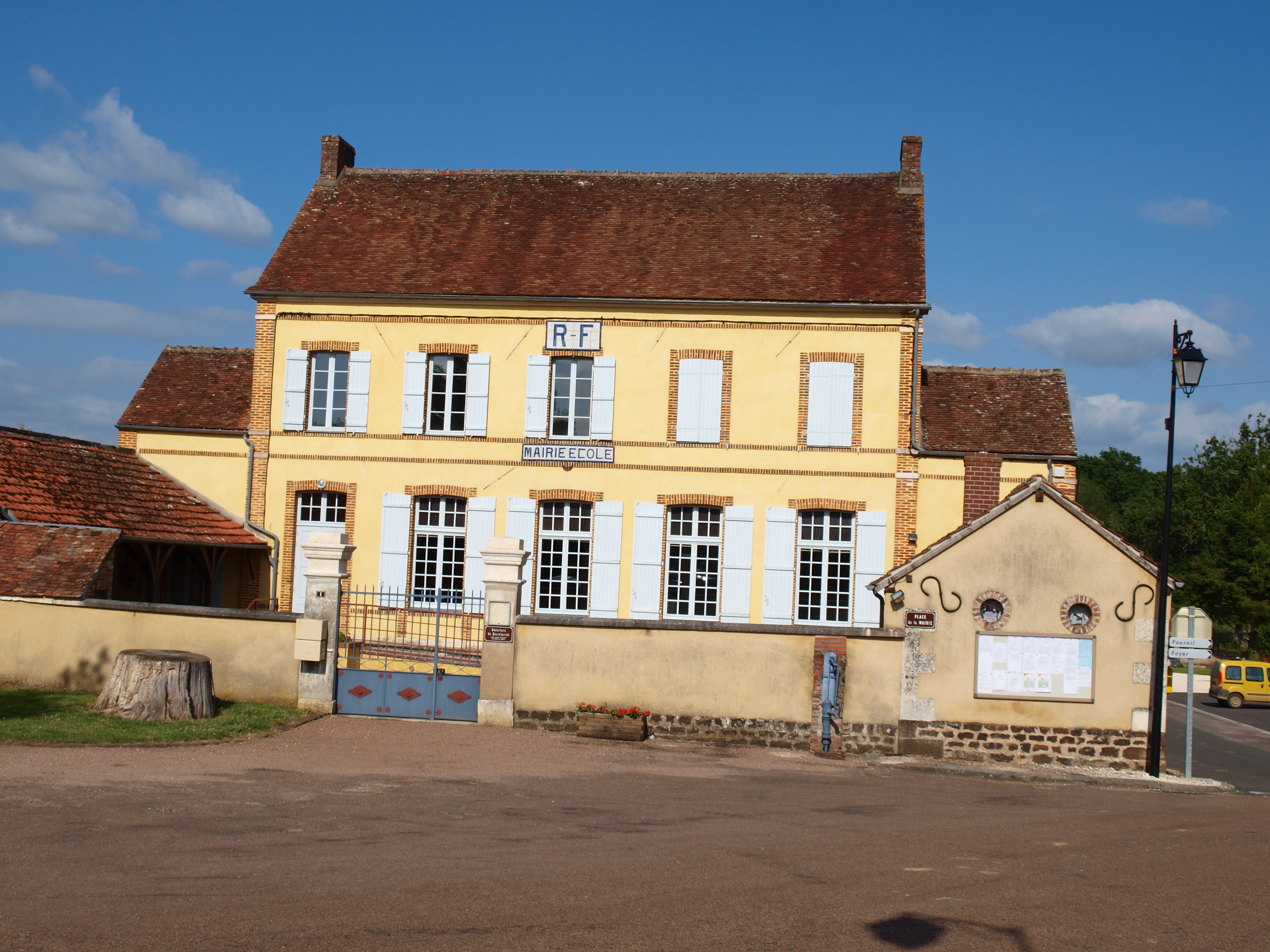
- The town hall in Moutiers-en-Puisaye
- Location of Moutiers-en-Puisaye
- Location within France Location within Bourgogne-Franche-Comté
- Coordinates: 47°36′38″N 3°10′36″E
- Country: France
- Region: Bourgogne-Franche-Comté
- Department: Yonne
- Arrondissement: Auxerre
- Canton: Vincelles

Government
  - Mayor (2020–2026): Claude Millot
- Area^{1}: 31.42 km^{2} (12.13 sq mi)
- Highest elevation: 297 m (974 ft)
- Lowest elevation: 207 m (679 ft)
- Population (2023): 268
  - Density: 8.53/km^{2} (22.1/sq mi)
- Time zone: UTC+01:00 (CET)
  - Summer (DST): UTC+02:00 (CEST)
- INSEE/Postal code: 89273 /89520
- ^{1} French Land Register data, which excludes lakes, ponds, glaciers > 1 km^{2} (0.386 sq mi or 247 acres) and river estuaries.

Moutiers-en-Puisaye (French pronunciation: [mutje ɑ̃ pɥizɛ], lit. 'Moutiers in Puisaye'; before 1993: Moutiers) is a commune in the Yonne department in Bourgogne-Franche-Comté in north-central France, in the historical region of Puisaye. The parish church is dedicated to Saints Peter and Paul.

== See also ==
- Communes of the Yonne department
