= Bitry, Nièvre =

Bitry
- Commune
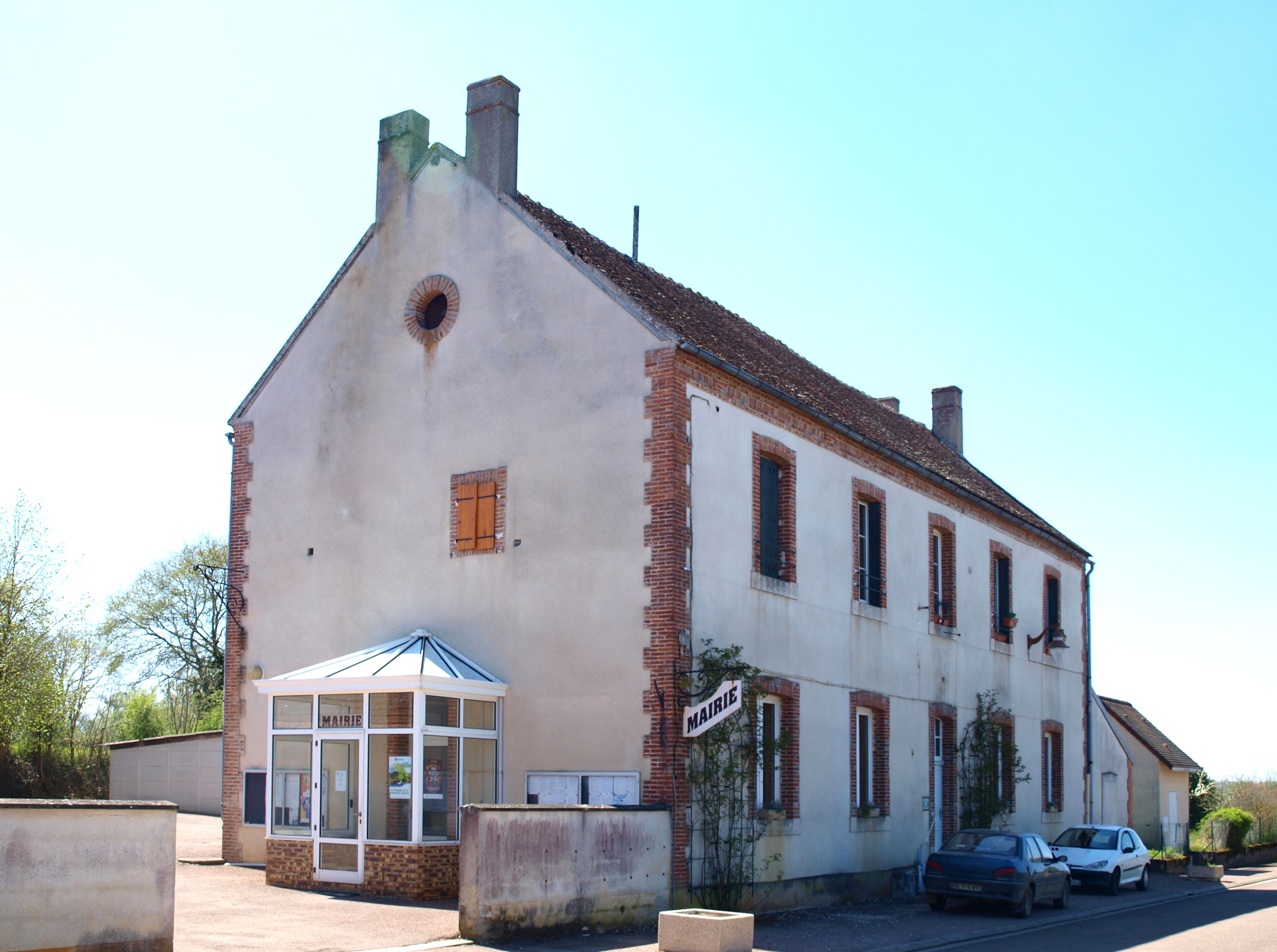
- The town hall in Bitry
- Location of Bitry
- Location within France Location within Bourgogne-Franche-Comté
- Coordinates: 47°29′28″N 3°04′50″E
- Country: France
- Region: Bourgogne-Franche-Comté
- Department: Nièvre
- Arrondissement: Cosne-Cours-sur-Loire
- Canton: Pouilly-sur-Loire
- Intercommunality: CC Puisaye-Forterre

Government
  - Mayor (2020–2026): Jean-Claude Fournier
- Area^{1}: 17.47 km^{2} (6.75 sq mi)
- Highest elevation: 328 m (1,076 ft)
- Lowest elevation: 181 m (594 ft)
- Population (2023): 308
  - Density: 17.6/km^{2} (45.7/sq mi)
- Time zone: UTC+01:00 (CET)
  - Summer (DST): UTC+02:00 (CEST)
- INSEE/Postal code: 58033 /58310
- ^{1} French Land Register data, which excludes lakes, ponds, glaciers > 1 km^{2} (0.386 sq mi or 247 acres) and river estuaries.

Bitry (French pronunciation: [bitʁi]) is a commune in the Nièvre department of central France.

== Population ==
Historical population
Year	Pop.	±% p.a.
1968	425	—
1975	392	−1.15%
1982	335	−2.22%
1990	305	−1.17%
1999	312	+0.25%
2007	316	+0.16%
2012	323	+0.44%
2017	305	−1.14%
2023	308	+0.16%
Source: INSEE

== See also ==
- Communes of the Nièvre department
