= Antoine de Chabannes =

French Military Commander and Count of Dammartin

- Count of Dammartin, Lord of Puisaye, etc.
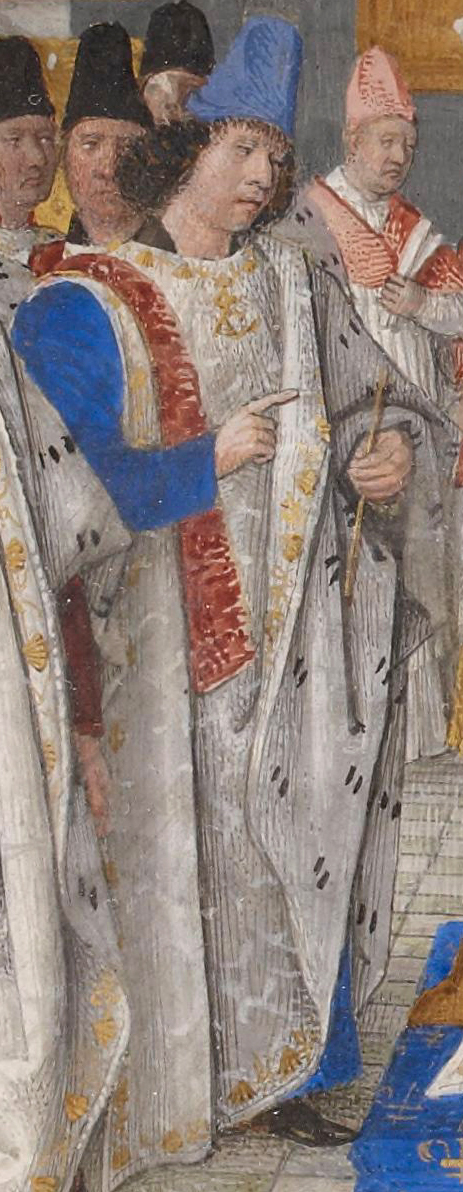
- Antoine de Chabannes depicted in the Statuts de l'ordre de Saint-Michel, attributed to Jean Fouquet, ca. 1470
- Born: 1408; Charlus-le-Pailhoux
- Died: December 25, 1488; Dammartin-en-Goële
- Buried: Dammartin-en-Goële (body); Saint-Fargeau (heart)
- Noble family: House of Chabannes
- Wife: Marguerite de Nanteuil (ca. 1422-1475)
- Issue: Jean de Chabannes (1462-1503); Gilbert, Jeanne, Jacqueline, Anne (dates unknown); Jacques, Hélène, Marie (illegitimate)
- Father: Robert de Chabannes
- Mother: Alix de Bort

Antoine de Chabannes (1408–1488), from 1439 Count of Dammartin (with a gap in 1463–1465), was a significant military and political figure of 15th-century France. An indefatigable fighter, during his long career he joined or led numerous military campaigns all over France and beyond. He served the Valois kings Charles VII, Louis XI and Charles VIII, but also participated in two aristocratic uprisings, the Praguerie against Charles VII in 1440 and the War of the Public Weal in 1465 against Louis XI. Associated early in his life with the Armagnac faction, he fought in Charles VII's campaigns against England, including those involving Joan of Arc, and (except for a troubled period in the early 1460s) also remained generally opposed to the Burgundians and their Habsburg successors. 18th-century scholar Charles Pinot Duclos described him as "one of the bravest men of his time, sincere, faithful, quick-tempered, a keen friend and implacable enemy" (un des plus braves hommes de son temps, sincère, fidèle, naturellement emporté, ami vif et implacable ennemi). Claude Villaret called him "the most experienced general of his era" (le général le plus expérimenté de son siècle).

His reputation has been tainted by his late-1430s freebooting écorcheur raids and by his avidity in appropriating properties of the disgraced Jacques Coeur in the early 1450s, mainly the lordship of Puisaye which Coeur's successors tried to reclaim in legal procedures that extended beyond Chabannes's lifetime. His rule in Puisaye, however, coincided with the revival of that region following the ravages of the Hundred Years' War and the broader Crisis of the Late Middle Ages.

== Family and early life ==
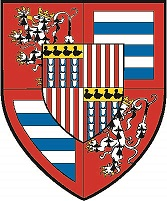
Arms of Antoine de Chabannes as appear on his tomb, quartering of Chabannes (de gueules au lion d'hermine, armé, couronné et lampassé d'or) and Dammartin (fascé d'argent et d'azur à la bordure de gueules), with escutcheon quartering of Toucy (d'or à trois pals de vair, au chef d'or chargé de quatre merlettes de gueules) and Sévérac (d'argent à quatre pals de gueules). In other occurrences, Antoine de Chabannes put the arms of the House of Châtillon, ancestors of his wife, in escutcheon.

The Chabannes were an aristocratic family established in the Limousin since the 13th century. Antoine's father Robert de Chabannes, lord of Charlus-le-Pailhoux (now in Saint-Exupéry-les-Roches), died at the Battle of Agincourt in 1415, and his elder brother Etienne de Chabannes died at the Battle of Cravant in 1423, where 15-year-old Antoine fought as well.

Following this succession of events, the family estates went to his brother Jacques de Chabannes. Antoine was left to assemble properties and titles on his own, which he kept doing throughout his long life.

== Service to Charles VII ==
Antoine de Chabannes was involved from a young age in the intrigues and fights of the embattled king Charles VII, associating himself with commanders La Hire and Xaintrailles. He was captured at the Battle of Verneuil but, given his youth, was freed without ransom by the Duke of Bedford. He then served Duke Charles I of the House of Bourbon as a page until 1426. The contemporary chronique martinienne observes of him at that time that "he was inclined towards fighting and eager to acquire recognition and properties" (tant il avait le coeur aux armes et envie d'acquérir honneurs et biens).

By 1428, 20-year-old Antoine de Chabannes fought alongside Joan of Arc in battles including Jargeau, Patay (where he led the vanguard and was wounded), and the Siege of Compiègne where Joan was captured in May 1430. In the meantime he had participated in the March to Reims and attended the epic coronation (sacre) of Charles VII, on 17 July 1429.

In the summer of 1429, Charles VII made him bailiff of Troyes, and in 1432, Captain of Creil, a stronghold loyal to Charles surrounded by hostile territory. In 1434, he was wounded in a bold attack on Old Talbot near Beaumont-sur-Oise. On 12 November 1437, he was with Charles VII at the latter's ceremonial entry into Paris, a major symbolic moment following the 1435 Treaty of Arras that put an end to the most chaotic period of the Hundred Years' War.

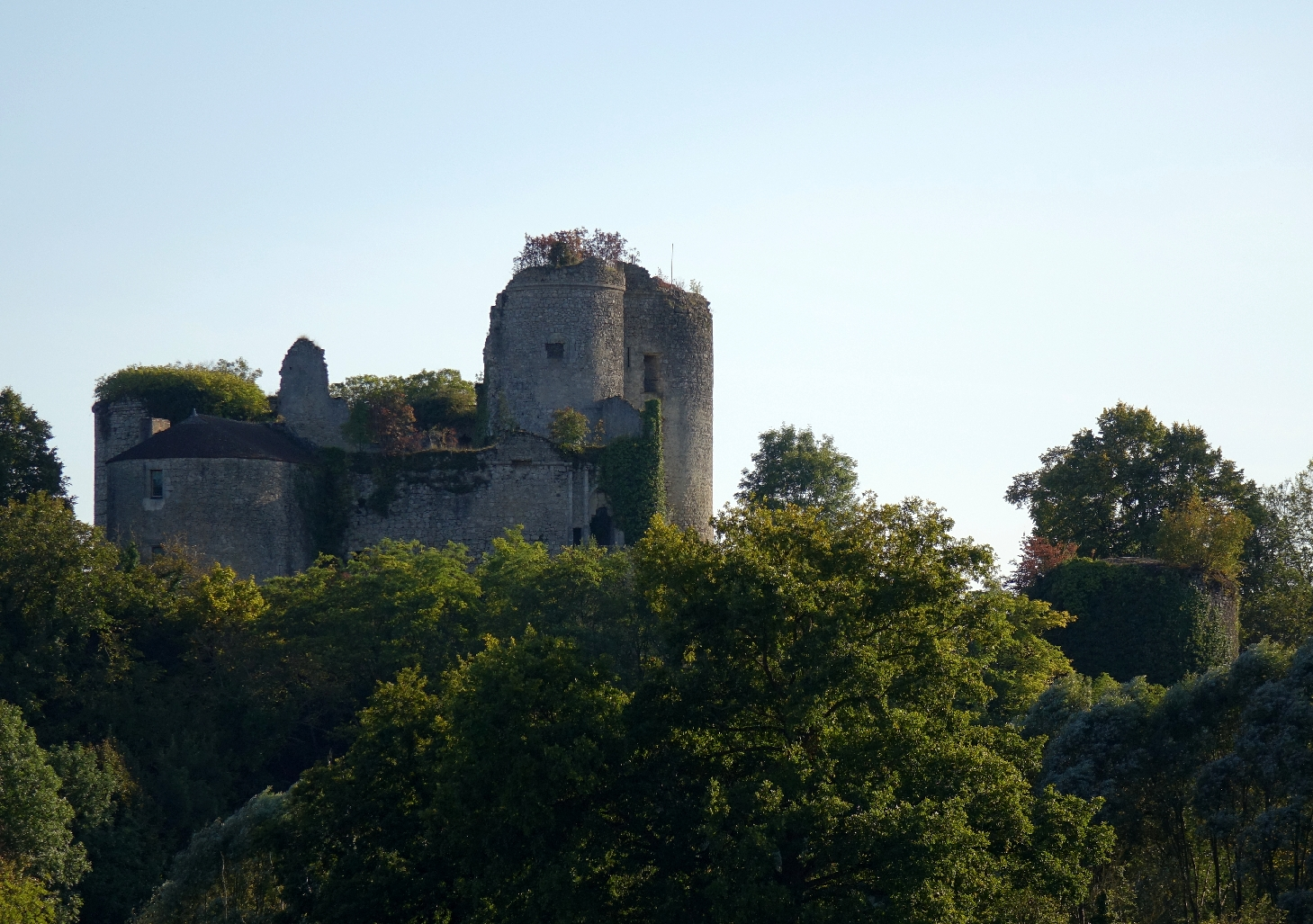
Ruins of the castle of Montaigu-le-Blin, a base of Antoine de Chabannes in the late 1430s

He spent most of the late 1430s leading his own band of soldiers, as one of the most prominent écorcheurs as they were labeled in contemporary chronicles, especially Burgundian ones: literally "flayers", referring to their practices of robbing and ransoming. Many of his freebooting raids were directed at lands of the Duke of Burgundy such as Hainaut, Cambrésis and Charolais, typically condoned by the king despite the stipulations of the Peace of Arras. Antoine de Chabannes also fought for the Duke of Bourbon, who made him Captain of Chavroches in 1438, and as part of royal operations, such as the siege of Meaux in 1439 led by Constable of France Arthur de Richemont. He occasionally let himself and his troops be hired as mercenaries, most notably for Antoine de Vaudémont against René of Anjou in 1438-39. He also used castles of the Chabannes family as his bases, such as the Château de Montaigu-le-Blin where he kept the lord of Pesmes prisoner in 1439. The grey area in which Antoine de Chabannes operated during those years, a hybrid of unsupervised banditry and royal service, is illustrated by a chronicler's story that Charles VII once saluted him ironically as "capitaine des écorcheurs", to which his reply was "Sire, I only flayed your enemies, and methinks their skins will bring you more profit than to me; I never flayed anybody else" (Sire, je n'ai écorché que vos ennemis, et il me semble que leurs peaux vous feront plus de profit qu'à moi; je n'en écorchai jamais d'autres).

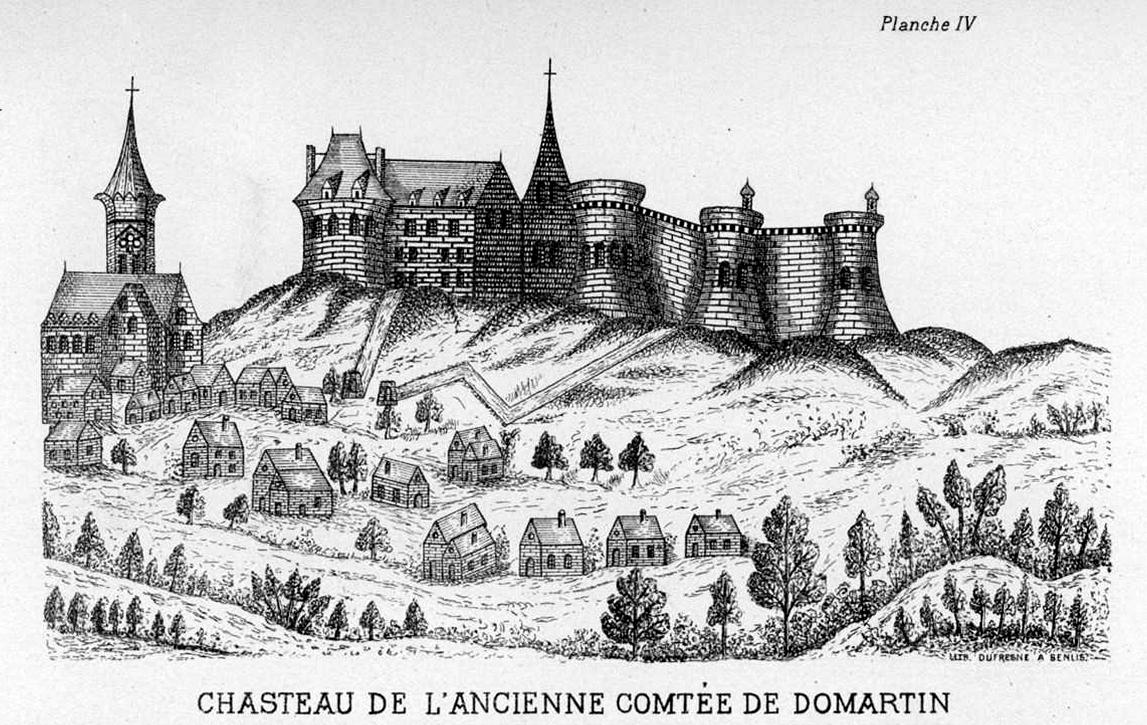
Castle of Dammartin-en-Goële northeast of Paris, entirely rebuilt in brick by Antoine de Chabannes's and later destroyed by Cardinal Richelieu in 1632

On 20 September 1439 Antoine de Chabannes married Marguerite de Nanteuil, Countess of Dammartin-en-Goële, to whom he had been recommended by the king. The marriage brought him the County of Dammartin as her dowry, as well as the barony of Le Thour in Champagne and the lordship of Marcy in Nivernais.

In 1440, he was one of the leaders of the Praguerie against Charles VII, and kept associating with the Dauphin Louis's actions in the following years, such as the Siege of Dieppe in 1442-43 and an expedition to support Sigismund of Habsburg against the Swiss, including the Battle of St. Jakob an der Birs near Basel where he fought furiously. Charles VII made him conseiller du roi in 1444, then Grand Panetier of France in 1445 (and again in 1447), after he had forced him and other warlords of the Hundred Years' War to dismiss their bands of soldiers as he strived to establish a standing army. On that occasion, Antoine de Chabannes wore mourning clothes, telling the king that he was "taking life away from him by separating him from his soldiers" (Sire, vous m'ôtez la vie d'éloigner mes gens d'armes de moi, avec lesquels j'ai vécu vingt ans sans reproche et sans faire de faute).

Antoine de Chabannes eventually broke with Louis in September 1446, by revealing to Charles VII the Dauphin's intrigues against Pierre de Brézé, and beyond against the king himself. This episode led to Louis's temporary banishment to the Dauphiné, upon which Louis swore that he would "take revenge against those who threw me out of my house", meaning Chabannes.

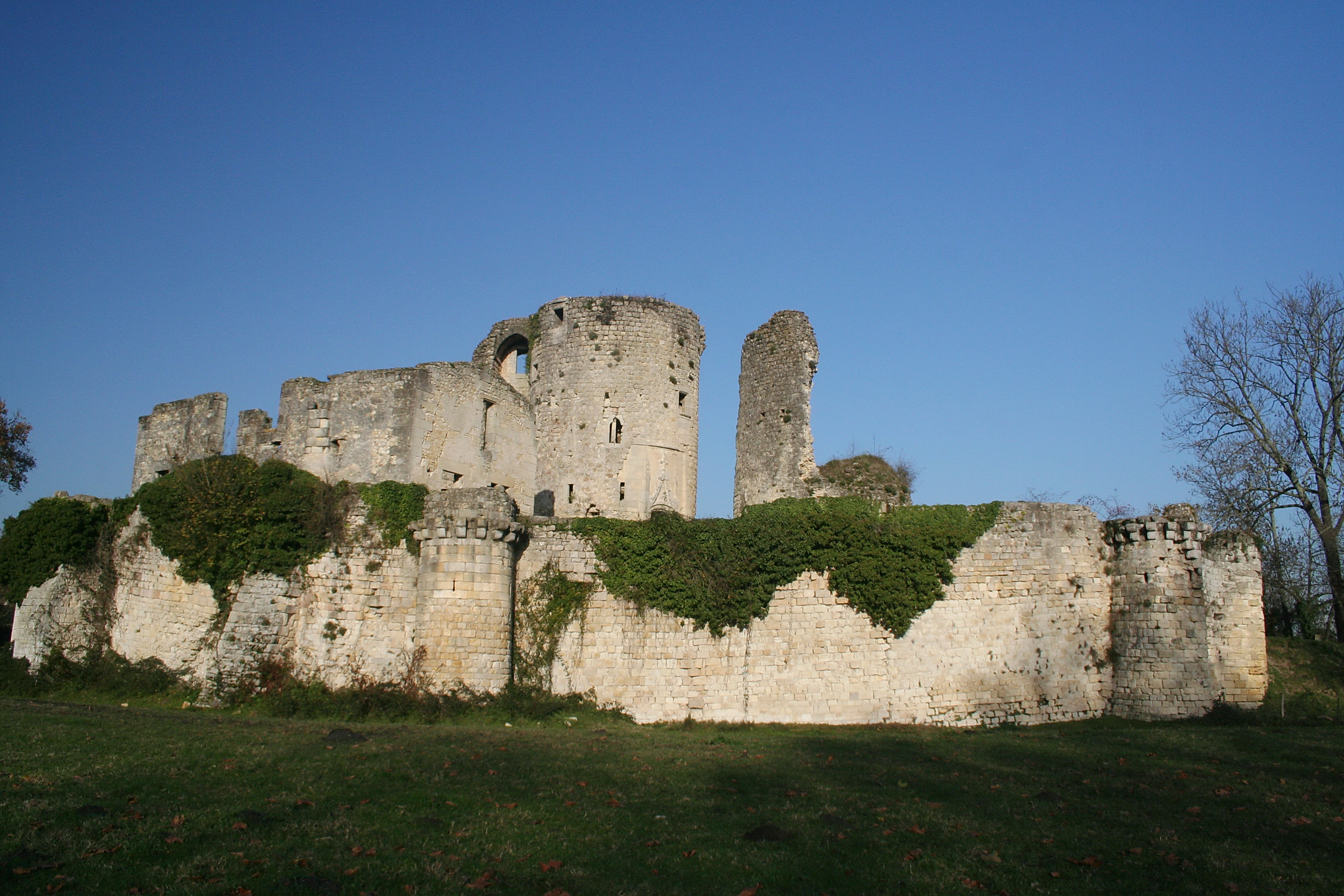
Château de Blanquefort near Bordeaux, restored by Antoine de Chabannes in the late 1450s

In 1449, he was with the king in the reconquest of Normandy, and in 1451 fought in Guyenne where he reconquered from the English the Château de Blanquefort near Bordeaux, nominally part of Marguerite de Nanteuil's dowry but out of her family's hands for 160 years. That castle was retaken by England later in 1451, and reconquered again by Chabannes in 1453. Charles VII confirmed his ownership of it in 1455 but Louis XI took it back in 1466.

Also in 1451, Antoine de Chabannes was appointed to chair the committee that investigated and led to the downfall of Jacques Coeur. He promptly appropriated a number of Coeur's properties including his recently acquired lordship of Puisaye. Charles VII's decision of 29 May 1453 specifically granted him: "(1) the lands, castles and lordships of Saint-Fargeau, of Lavau, of La Couldre, of Perreuse, of Champignelles, of Mézilles, or Villeneuve-les-Genêts and their dependencies; (2) the lands of Saint-Maurice-sur-Aveyron, Melleroy, La Frenaie, Fontenelles, and their dependencies; (3) the Barony of Toucy with its belongings and dependencies." Between 1453 and 1455 he further secured ownership of the Puisaye domains by purchasing them in auction.

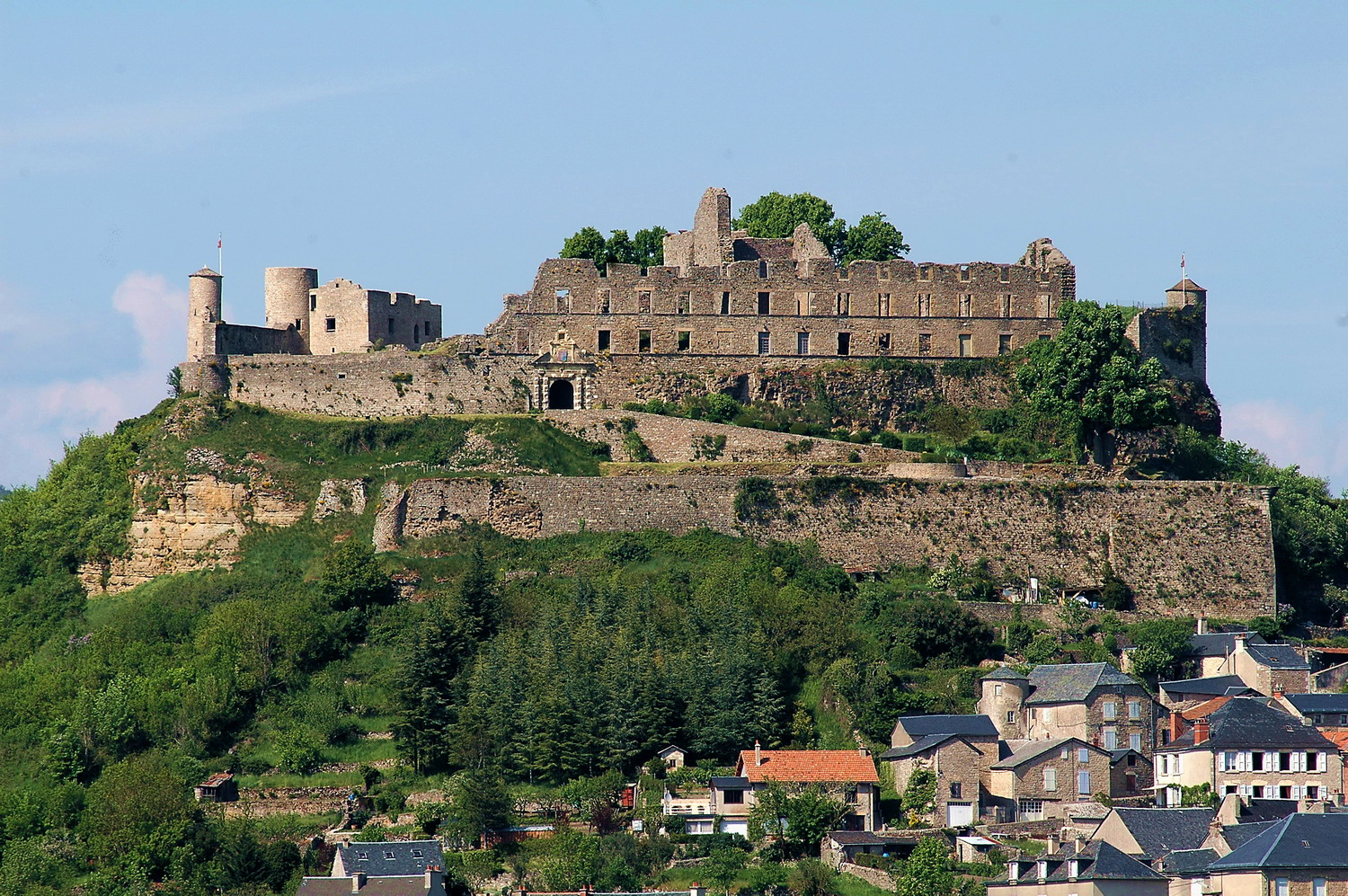
Castle of Sévérac, awarded by the king to Antoine de Chabannes in 1455 for his service in Rouergue

In October 1453, he received the command of soldiers of his brother Jacques, who had died from his wounds at the Battle of Castillon. He then led a campaign in 1454 against John V, Count of Armagnac on the king's behalf, jointly with Jean Bureau, for which he was awarded a number of lands in Rouergue and Languedoc including the lordship of Sévérac. In 1455-56 he was sent to Lyon, Savoy and the Dauphiné to put an end to the Dauphin Louis's machinations, prompting the latter's flight to the court of Burgundy. In 1458, he and Jean d'Aulon jointly led a successful embassy to Louis, Duke of Savoy and Philip the Good, Duke of Burgundy to avert war between France and them both. in 1461, he stayed with Charles VII at the Château de Mehun-sur-Yèvre until the king's death on July 22.

== Service to Louis XI and Charles VIII ==
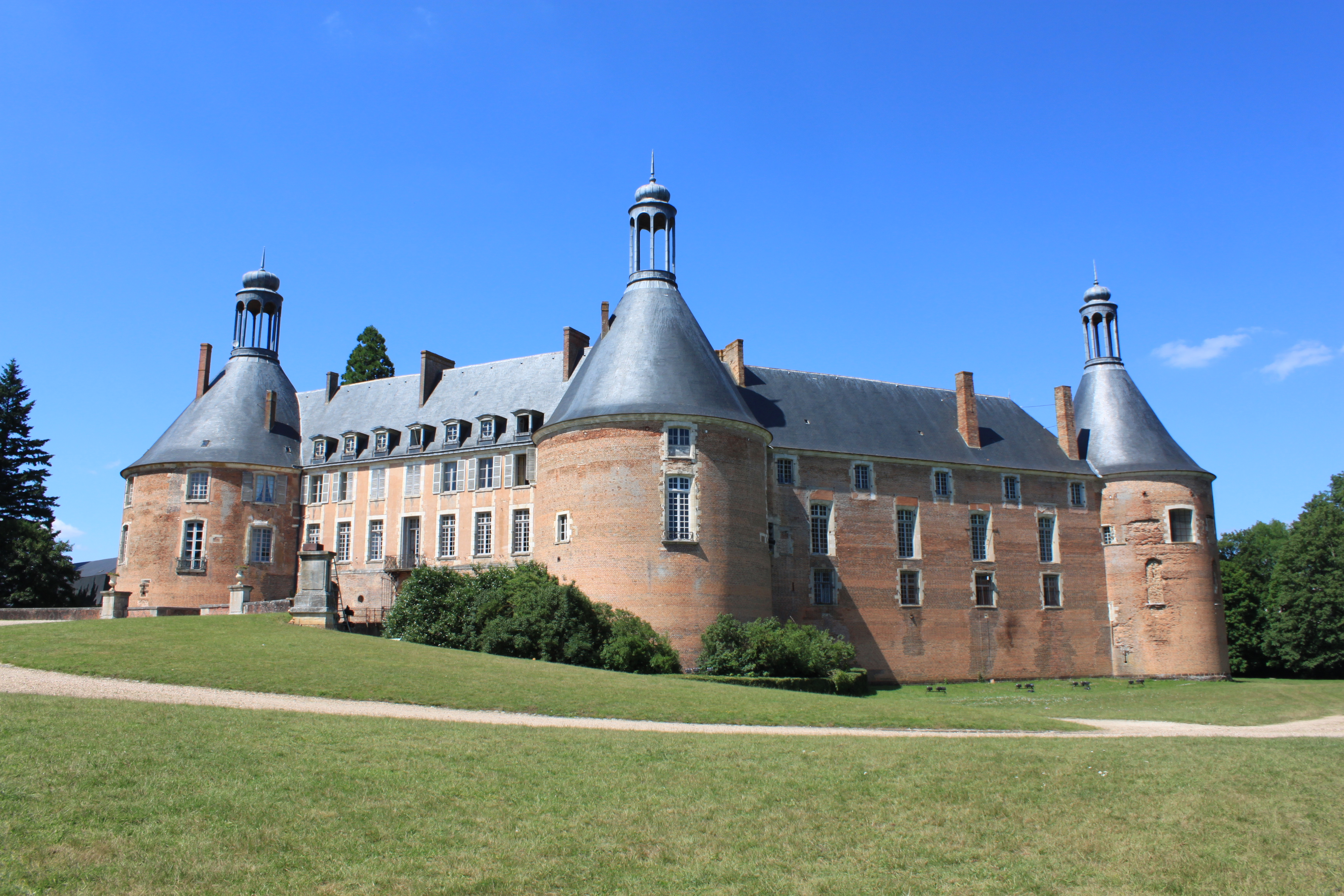
Château de Saint-Fargeau, rebuilt by Antoine de Chabannes from 1467 as his main stronghold in the Puisaye

On succeeding Charles VII in 1461, Louis XI was initially hostile to Antoine de Chabannes, banished him from the kingdom, then upon his voluntary return from the Holy Roman Empire in August 1462 imprisoned him briefly in the Conciergerie and then in the Louvre. Following a hearing on 20 August 1463, Chabannes received a death sentence from the Parlement of Paris, which was commuted by the king into perpetual banishment to Rhodes, then after a change of mind, imprisonment in the Bastille. Meanwhile, Louis XI had the Puisaye domains returned to Jacques Coeur's son Geoffroy, and Chabannes's other properties granted to his rivals Charles de Melun, Jean de Montespedon and Antoine de Chateauneuf.

The ever-resourceful Chabannes, however, managed to escape from the Bastille in early March 1465 and joined the so-called League of the Public Weal against the king. That conflict was swiftly resolved following the Treaty of Conflans, of which he was one of the main negotiators. At the request of the League's princely members, the treaty included a specific clause by which Louis XI gave back to Antoine de Chabannes all his former domains. In February 1467, the king further made him the Grand Master of France, in replacement of his former nemesis Charles de Melun (who ended up decapitated the next year), and in August 1468 finally annulled his 1463 conviction. However, the legal procedures with the Coeur family over the Puisaye domains lingered on until a final settlement in 1489, shortly after Antoine de Chabannes's death.

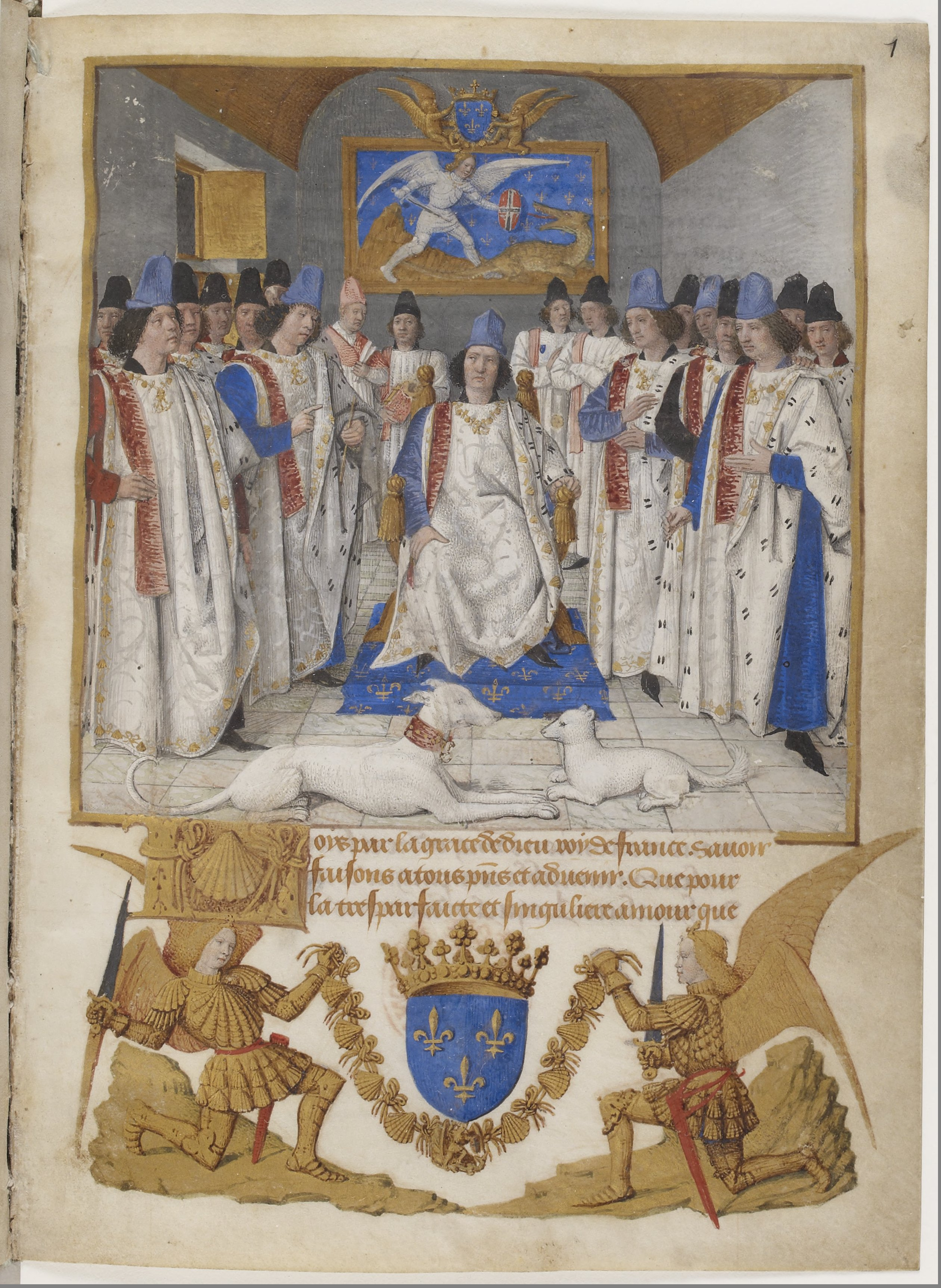
Front page of the statute of the Order of Saint Michael, ca. 1470, depicting Antoine de Chabannes talking to the king (7th from left, with blue hat and holding a ceremonial baton)

In 1468, Chabannes decisively refused to demobilize the royal troops assembled in Noyon despite a written order Louis had signed under duress in Péronne, which fully regained him the King's confidence. He had the honor of being among the Order of Saint Michael's first cohort of 15 knights in August 1469, confirming his return to the inner core of the French royal court. In late 1469 he was sent by Louis XI to pacify the Guyenne and Armagnac, leading John V, Count of Armagnac to flee across the border to Hondarribia, and gained additional lands in Rouergue as reward from the king.

In the early 1470s he led royal military campaigns together with Louis of Luxembourg, Count of Saint-Pol, always under tight instructions from Louis XI. In 1470 he took Amiens from Burgundy. In 1472 he was made Military governor of Paris, and participated in the defense of Beauvais against Charles the Bold. In December 1474, he had the honor of hosting the king and the royal court in his castle of Dammartin; around that time Louis would address him familiarily as his "cousin". On 29 August 1475, he attended the meeting of Picquigny between Louis XI and Edward IV of England, which undermined the Anglo-Burgundian alliance and marked the formal end of the Hundred Years' War. Following Charles the Bold's death in January 1477, still fit to lead military operations despite his advanced age, he raided Flanders during the War of the Burgundian Succession. He then held the frontline stronghold of Le Quesnoy for more than a year. Louis XI, heowever, replaced him there with Jean Daillon in June 1478 as part of a truce in which the king relinquished Hainaut to Maximilian, and episode that crystallized a new deterioration of Chabannes's relationship with the king.

In the spring of 1479, Louis XI relieved him of his military command, even though he kept his pension and other titles, and was still occasionally called for advice. In 1483, some of his domains in Rouergue were granted by Louis to the Canons Regular of the Lateran, as part of the donation that eventually resulted in the President of France being an honorary canon of Saint John Lateran. Chabannes was duly indemnified.

Following Louis XI's death, Antoine de Chabannes was back in favor under the young Charles VIII, who on 23 October 1483 reappointed him captain and governor of Sévérac. At the Estates General in Tours, in February 1484, he was sitting on the bench to the king's right, together with Jean IV de Rieux and Louis II de la Trémoille. In 1485, he further increased his domains by purchasing the barony of Courtenay, just north of the Puisaye. In his last years, he lived mainly in his castles of Dammartin-en-Goële and Saint-Fargeau, with occasional Parisian stays in his hôtel de Beautreillis, part of the former royal palace of Hôtel Saint-Pol whose name survives in the Rue Beautreillis. He was again made Military governor of Paris by the regent Anne of France. He maintained an active written correspondence with the king, who appears to have valued his advice.

== Death and legacy ==
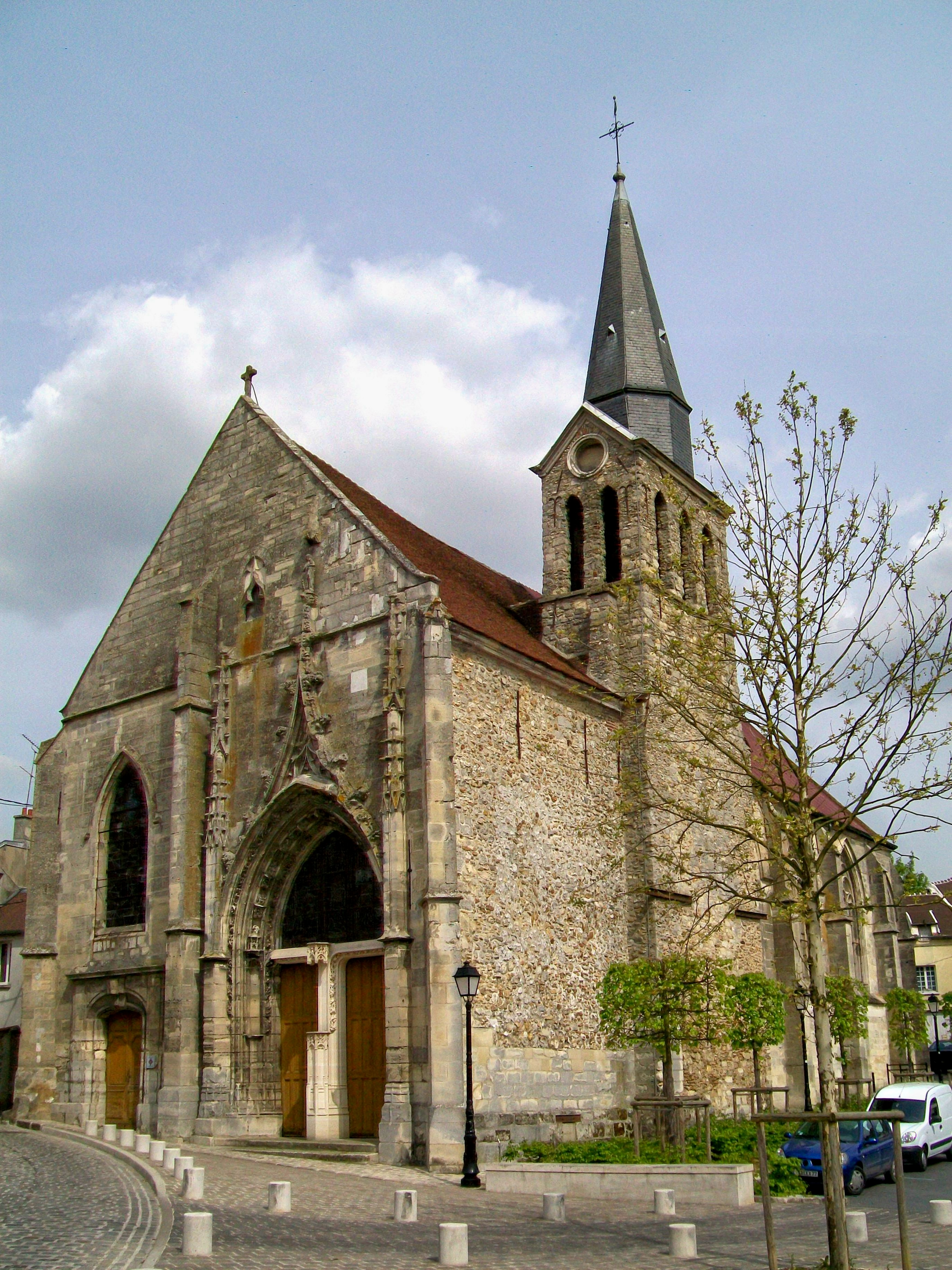
Church of Our Lady in Dammartin-en-Goële (before restoration in 2017)

Antoine de Chabannes died on Christmas Day 1488. He was buried in the collegiate church of Our Lady (Collégiale Notre-Dame) in Dammartin-en-Goële, which he had built from 1480, following a wish he had made in 1463 while imprisoned in the Bastille, on the site of a chapel that had been destroyed during the War of the Public Weal. The church had been consecrated by the Bishop of Meaux on 18 February 1488, less than a year before Chabannes's death.

The still-extant monumental tomb displays an idealized youth portrait of him as a gisant with a phoenix bird at his feet, which may refer to eternal life but also to the ups and downs of his long career. The tomb was opened and restored in 1804, as related by a commemorative plaque which is now placed in front of it. The inscription on the rim of the lid reads: "Cy gist noble et puissant seigneur messire anthoine de chabannes, ch[eva]l[ie]r de l'ordre du Roy n[ot]r[e] s[ir]e, en son vivant comte de dampmartin baron de toussy et du tour en Champaigne, et seignieur de saint fargeau de saint morise de courtenay et du pays de puisaye, et grand maistre d'ostel de France; Et fut premier fond[at]eur du chapitre et coliège de l'église de céans, le quel trépassa le jour de Noël de l'an de grace mil CCCC.IIIIxx et huit : Dieu lui face pardon à l'âme et à tous aultres trespassés. Amen : Pater noster."

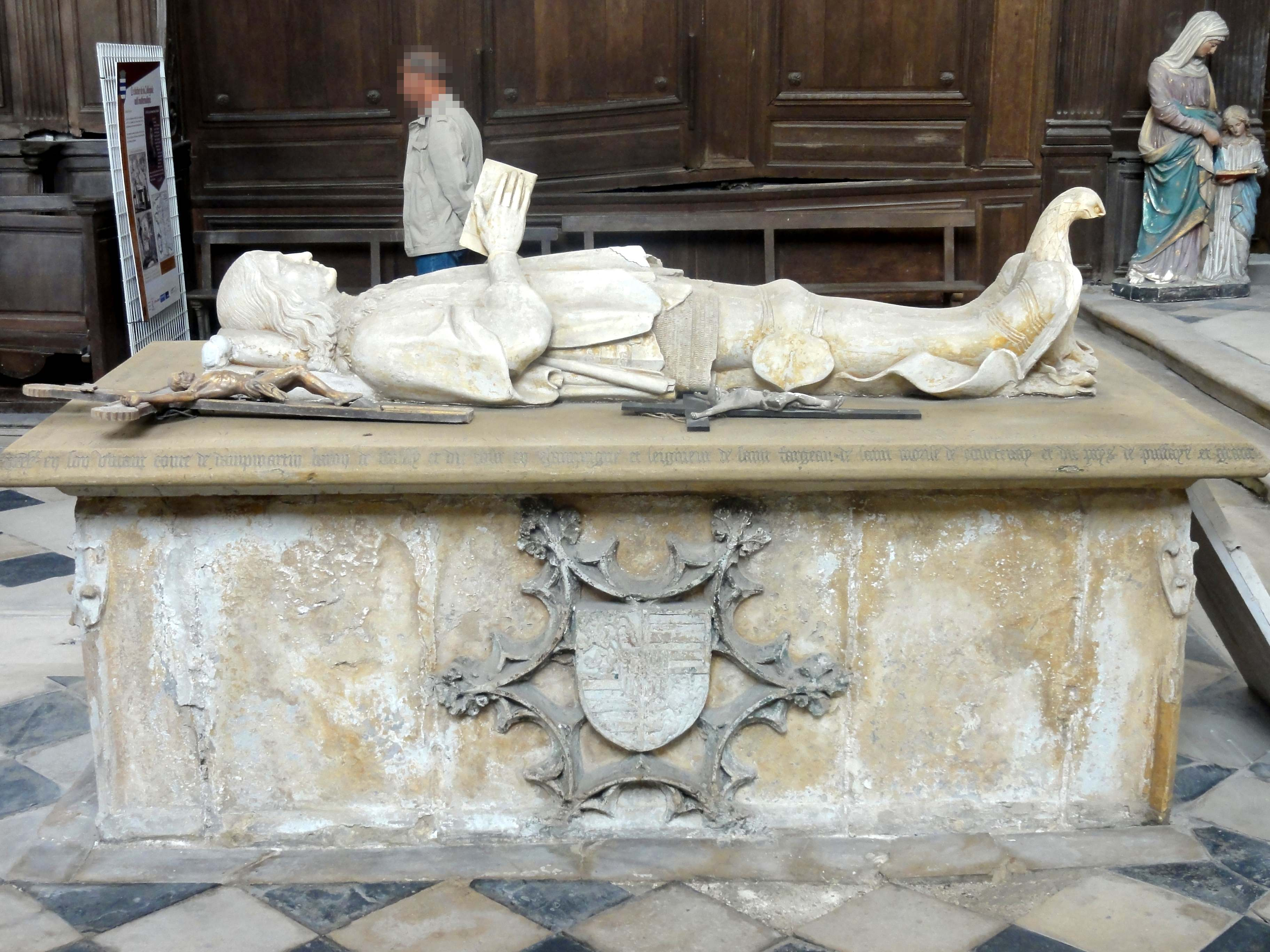
Antoine de Chabannes's tomb in Dammartin

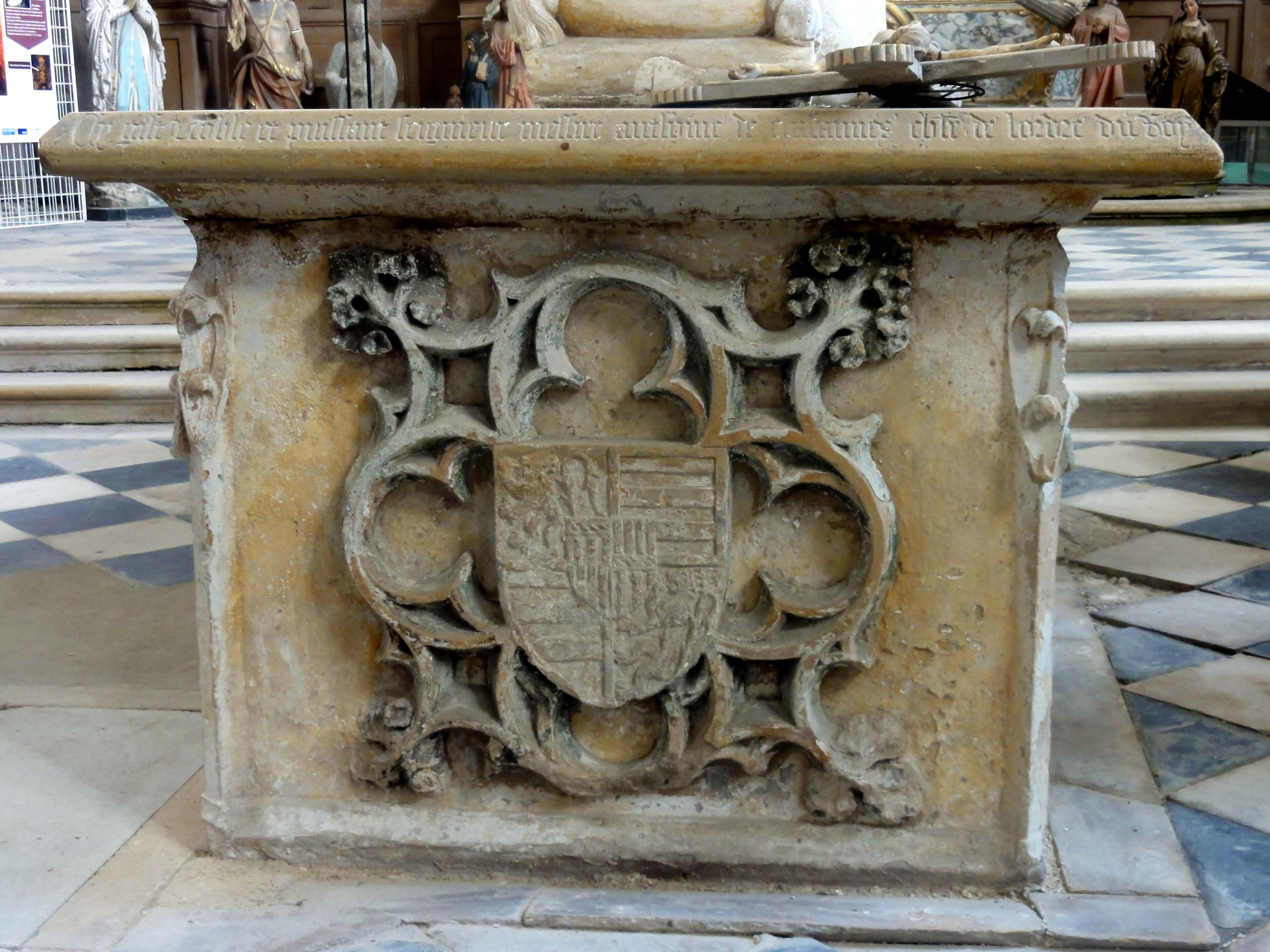
Arms of Antoine de Chabannes on his tomb

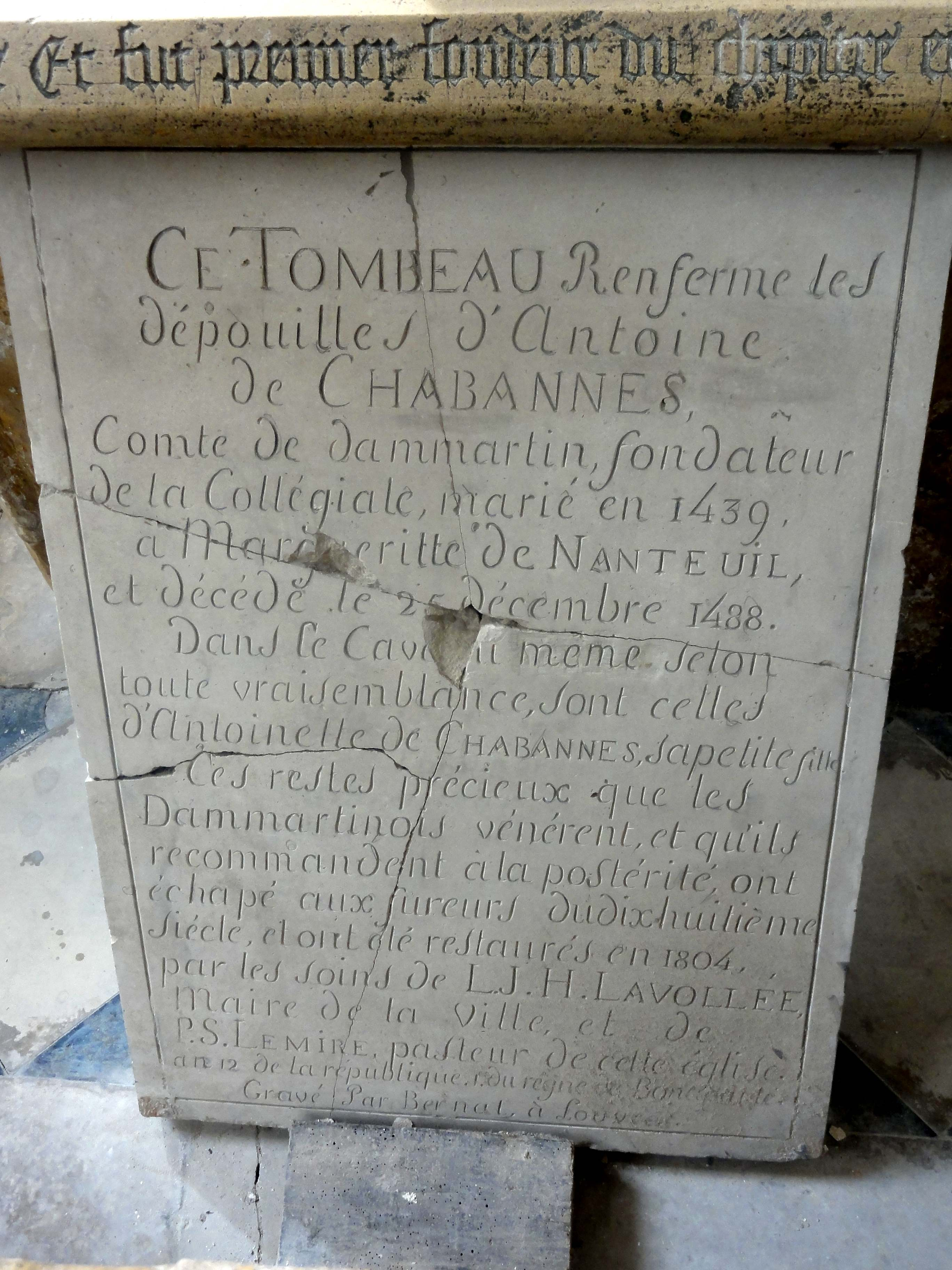
Commemorative plaque of the 1804 restoration

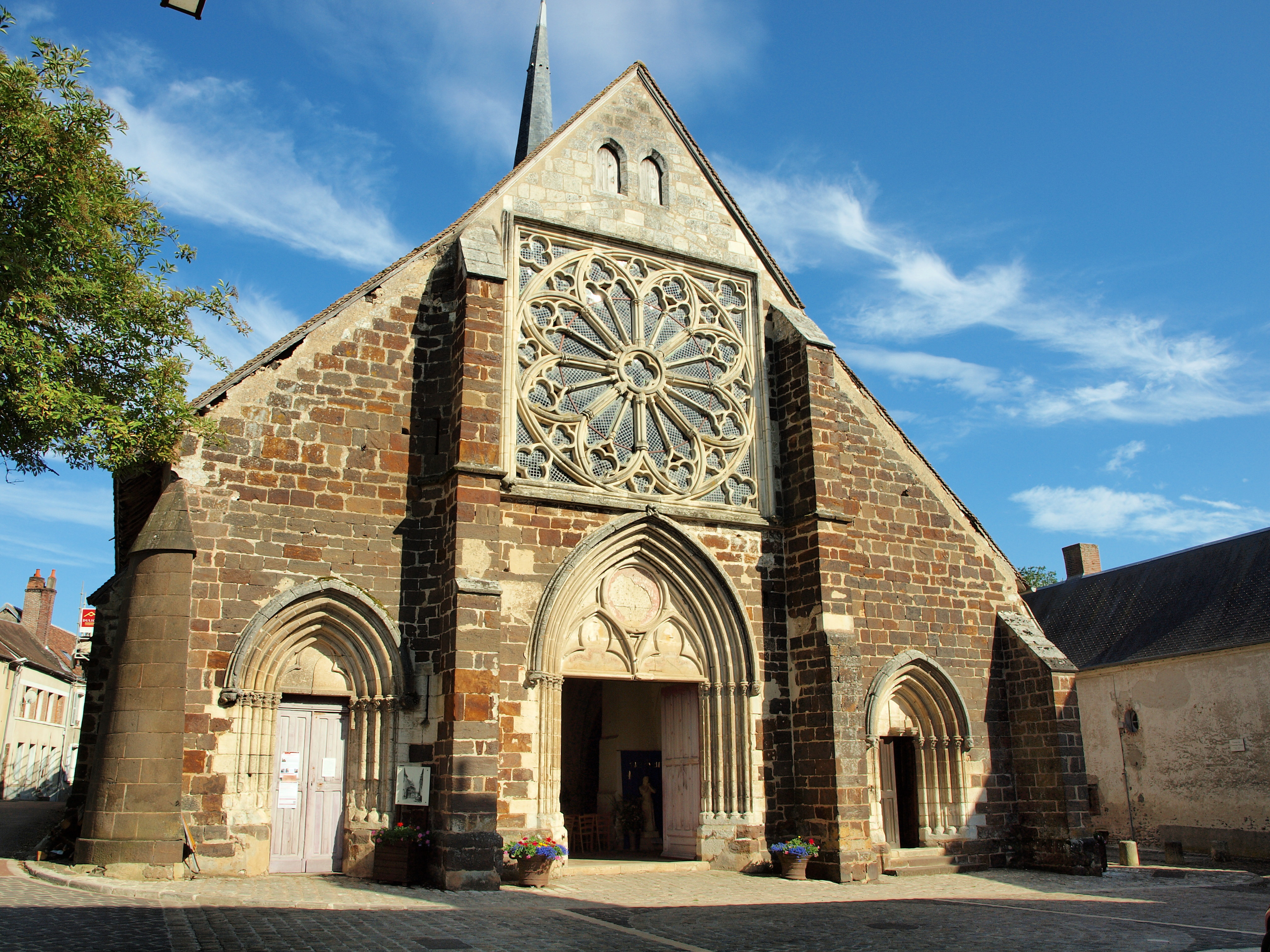
Church of Saint-Ferréol in Saint-Fargeau

Chabannes's heart and innards were buried separately in the church of Saint-Ferréol in Saint-Fargeau, at the core of his domains in Puisaye, where his wife had been buried in 1475. Until the 17th century, the corresponding location inside the church was adorned with a small monument and an epitaph that read "Antoine de Chabannes, / Mort suis sans trahison / Mais bien aimant raison / Conte et aussi grant mestre. / Dieu me mettre en bon estre ! / J'aimai loyauté / Qui m'a toujours porté, / Tant qu'au monde ait esté; / D'ennemi non vaincu / D'ans IIIIxx [80] j'ai vescu, / On le sait, de trois roys non reprint. / Sur ce point, Dieu m'a print." The metal chest that contained the heart was later relocated to a chapel within the same church, in which Antoine de Chabannes's son had also erected an equestrian statue of him, probably destroyed in 1793.

He was succeeded as Count of Dammartin-en-Goële by his only surviving son John (Jean de Chabannes), born in 1462, who had already been calling himself Lord of Saint-Fargeau since 1470. Antoine's direct male line became extinct at Jean's death in 1503. In 1554, the County of Dammartin was purchased by Constable Anne de Montmorency, and remained in the House of Montmorency, then (after the 1632 execution of Henri II de Montmorency, which also led to the Dammartin castle's destruction) of Bourbon-Condé until the French Revolution. The domains in Puisaye were soon divided between Saint-Fargeau, which went to the Houses of Anjou-Mézières and then of Bourbon-Montpensier, and Toucy, which remained in the local family of Prie. Other branches of the Chabannes family survive to this day.

=== In popular culture ===
Antoine de Chabannes features in Le Spectre de Châtillon, a 1855 novel by Élie Berthet.

He is portrayed as a devious military governor of Paris in the 1956 film The Vagabond King.
