= March to Reims =

1429 French campaign of the Hundred Years' War

- Part of the Hundred Years' War
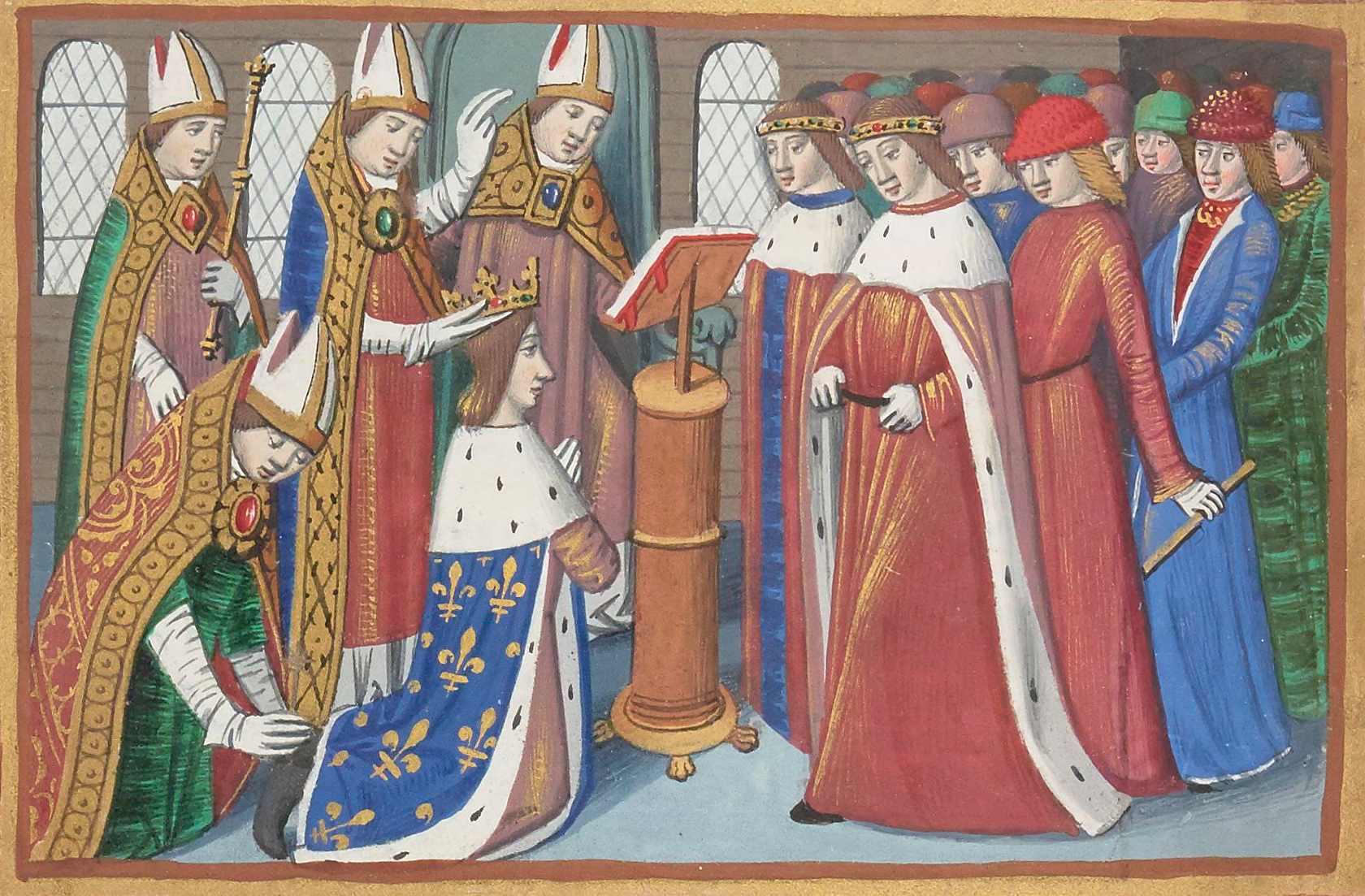
- Coronation of Charles VII in Reims (miniature from the Vigiles du roi Charles VII (Vigils of King Charles VII) by Martial d'Auvergne, Paris, BnF, Manuscripts department).
Date	24 June – 16 July 1429
Location	Gien to Reims, France
Result	French victory Coronation of Charles VII in Reims

Belligerents
Kingdom of France	Kingdom of England; Burgundian State

Commanders and leaders
Charles VII of France; Joan of Arc; Jean II d'Alençon; Jean de Dunois; La Hire; Jean de Xaintrailles; Ambroise de Loré; Jean de Brosse; Gilles de Rais; Louis de Culant; Georges de la Trémoille; Charles II of Albret; Charles de Bourbon; Louis, Count of Vendôme; Guy de Montfort-Laval; André de Lohéac; Jean V de Bueil; Gilbert Motier de La Fayette Pierre Bessonneau	Henry VI of England; John of Lancaster, 1st Duke of Bedford; Philip the Good; Thomas de Scales; John Beaufort, 3rd Earl of Somerset John Fastolf

After the French lifted the siege of Orléans and won a decisive victory at the Battle of Patay, the English and Burgundians no longer posed a threat. Joan of Arc convinced the Dauphin Charles to go to Reims for his coronation. Successfully marching their army though the heart of territory held by the hostile Burgundians solidified the Dauphin’s regrasp of the throne of France. He had been disinherited from it through the Treaty of Troyes.

== Background ==
Following the assassination of John the Fearless, the Treaty of Troyes in 1420 gave the throne of France to Henry V of England. Henry had married the daughter of King Charles VI of France, and his son Henry VI was to succeed him to the thrones of both France and England. But Henry V died in 1422 when his son was not yet one year old; the regency was entrusted to John of Lancaster, Duke of Bedford. The intervention of Joan of Arc with the Dauphin Charles was seen as miraculous, even more so after the lifting of the Siege of Orléans and the Battle of Patay.

1415–1429 Territories controlled by Henry VI of England Territories controlled by Philip III of Burgundy Territories controlled by Charles VII of France Main battles English raid of 1415 Joan's journey from Domrémy to Chinon Raid of Jeanne d'Arc to Reims in 1429

== March to Reims ==
For the first time in the history of France, the eldest son of the king did not inherit the crown. Charles VI of France disinherited his son, leaving the kingdom of France to Henry VI of England, the son of his daughter Catherine. After Charles VI died, his son challenged his disinheritance and claimed the throne. Despite the French victory in the Battle of Patay on 18 June, which caused the English to retreat to Paris, the Dauphin refused to continue on to Reims, which was held by the Burgundians. He remained in Sully-sur-Loire then withdrew to Orléans intending to be crowned there, as Louis VI had been. Nevertheless, a coronation in Reims would have a much greater impact because it would be seen as a new miracle, attesting to his divine legitimacy.

After initially meeting the Dauphin on 23 May 1429 at Loches, Joan of Arc next met him on 21 June at the Fleury Abbey to persuade him to go to Reims. The next day, the dauphin's council met in Châteauneuf-sur-Loire and ordered the army to gather at Gien.

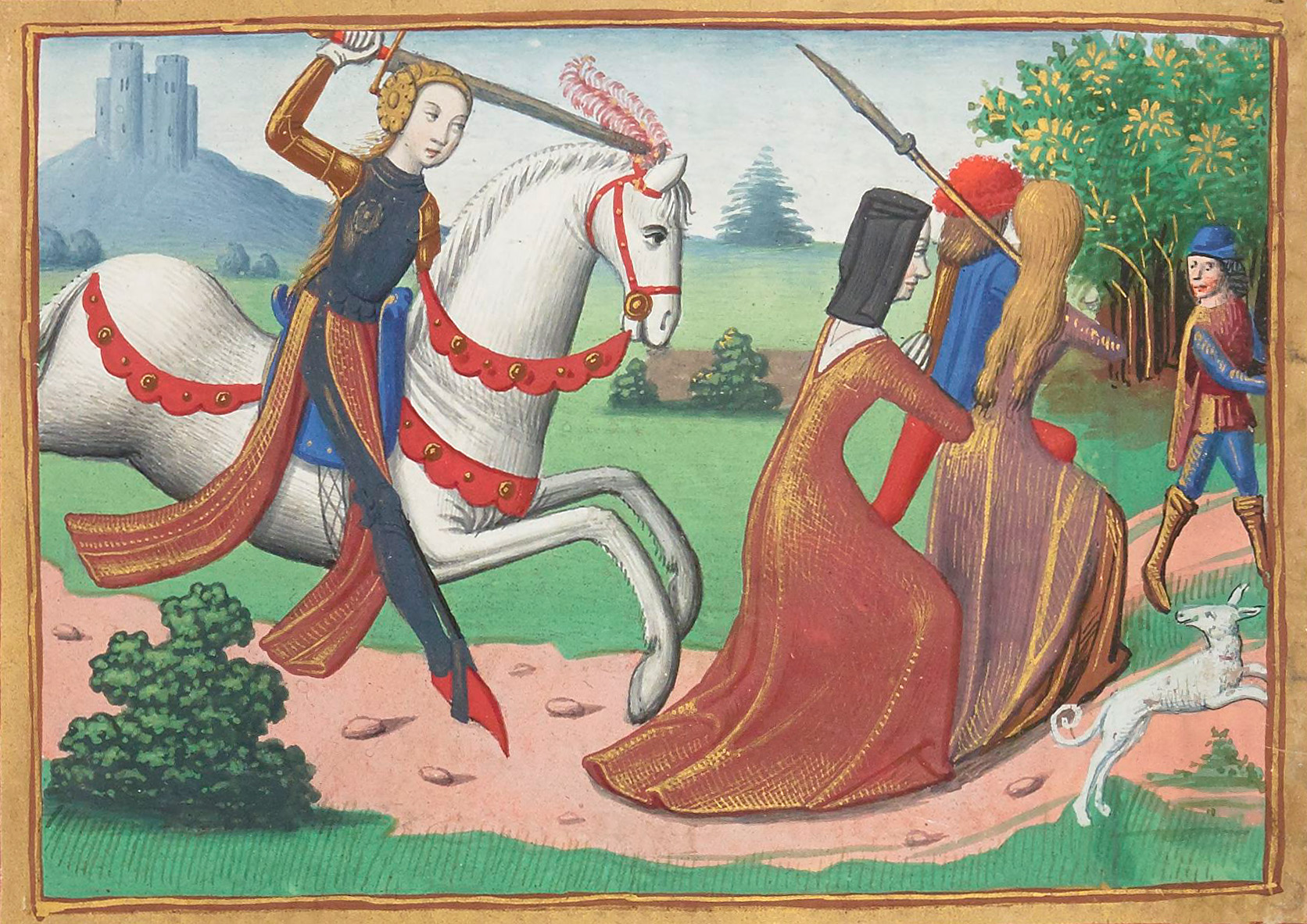
Joan of Arc chasing off camp followers

On 24 June, preceded by her squire, Louis de Coutes, who held her banner emblazoned Jhésus Maria, Joan of Arc — arriving at Gien wearing her armor forged in Tours and the sword of Fierbois, found Charles VII. The next day 12,000 men of the king's army gathered in Gien, bringing to 33,000 the cavalry forces and 40,000 foot soldiers. The French army took Bonny-sur-Loire and Saint-Fargeau.

Joan of Arc broke her sword on the back of a camp follower. Two days later the Dauphin ordered a march to the city of the coronation: the march began at Gien on 29 June 1429. The ease of the march showed both the fragility of the Anglo-Burgundian rule and the restoration of confidence in the cause of Charles VII of France. According to Jean de Dunois, bluffing was the only tactic that opened the gates of the city. The Marshal of France Gilles de Rais rode to Reims, hoping to use this victorious march to retrieve a ransom of land taken from "collaborators."

Joan of Arc left Gien accompanied by her captains: Tugdual de Kermoysan, La Hire, André of Lohéac, Pierre Rieux, Jean V de Bueil, Pierre Bessonneau, Jacques de Chabannes, Jacques de Dinan, Pierre Bessonneau, and Jean Poton de Xaintrailles. On the road to Reims, the Constable Richemont sent Pierre Rostrenen to ask the dauphin for leave to serve him at his coronation. Rostrenen instead accompanied the constable to Parthenay. During the march, the Burgundian garrison in Auxerre refused to open its gates. Georges de la Trémoille, a favorite of the Dauphin, reportedly bribed the minister of the city two thousand gold écus.

The city remained neutral and allowed the French army to resupply itself and camp outside its walls on 1 and 2 July. The army of the Dauphin left again; Saint-Florentin submitted immediately, as did Brienon l’Archevêque. On 4 July, the army reached Troyes, occupied by five or six hundred Burgundians, who refused to open the gates.

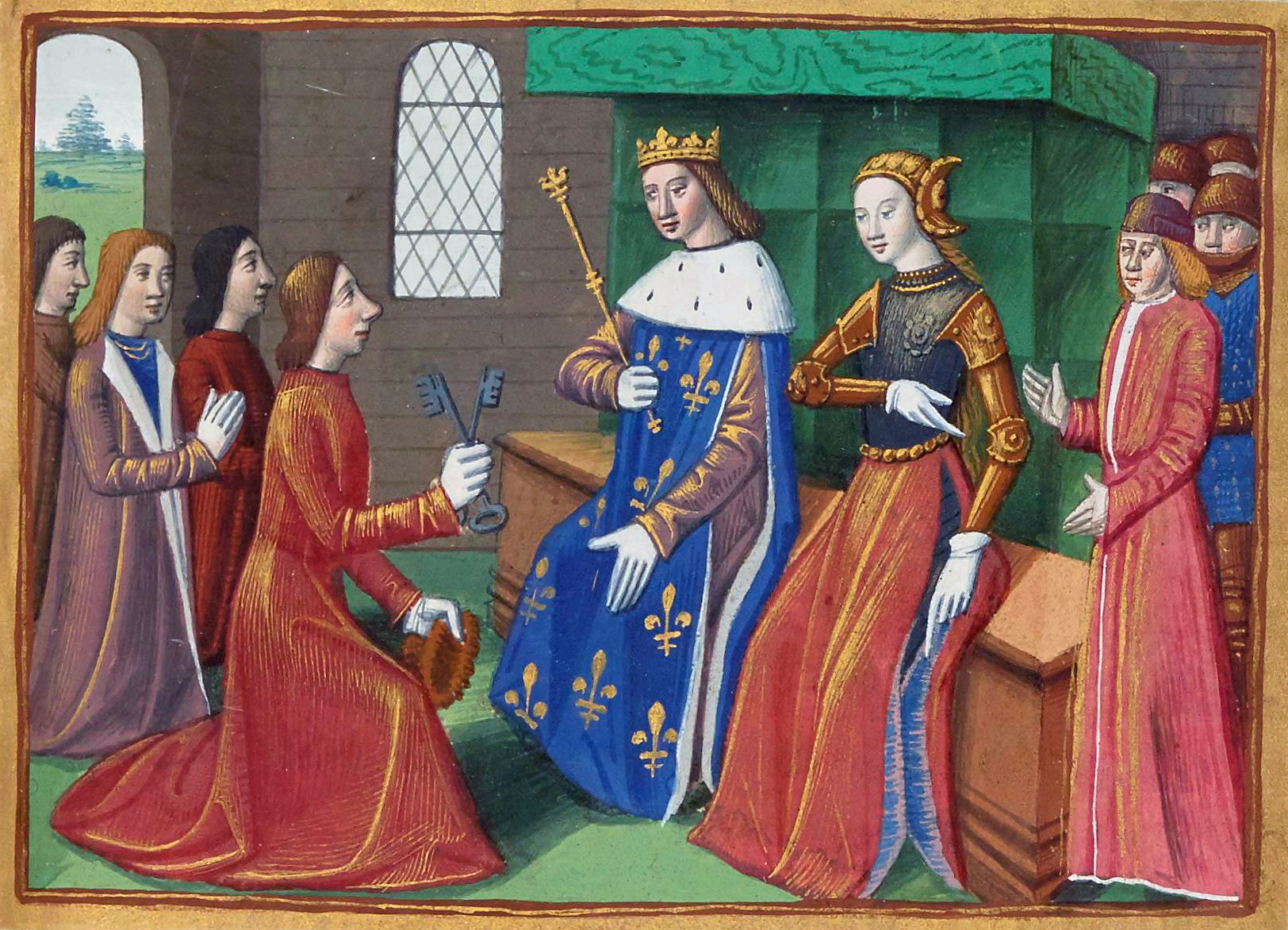
Miniature from Vigiles du roi Charles VII. The citizens of Troyes hand over city keys to the Dauphin and Joan of Arc.

After four days of siege, the majority of the Dauphin's council wanted to lift the siege and continue on the road without entering the city. On the fifth day of the siege, 9 July, Troyes capitulated (for fear of attack), but only Charles VII and the captains were able to enter. The soldiers spent the night in Saint-Phal, under the command of Ambroise de Loré. Gilles de Rais was one of the leaders of the army who reduced Troyes to obedience.

Fewer than 2,000 English soldiers of the captain of Paris, John of Lancaster, occupied Paris, which had as its provost Simon Morhier, and as Governor Jean de La Baume. Philip the Good of Burgundy opted to leave Laon for Paris, where he arrived on 10 July, appointed the Master of the Louvre Jean de Villiers de L'Isle-Adam governor, and committed to him the safety of Paris in the absence of Lancaster. Philip sent ambassadors to the Dauphin to sue for peace.

On 11 July the Dauphin's army left Troyes to head to Châlons-en-Champagne, which opened its gates on 14 July to let him spend the night.

On Saturday 16 July, Philip the Good left Paris to return to Laon, while the Archbishop of Reims, Regnault de Chartres, left Reims in the hands of William, Lord of Châtillon-sur-Marne and of the Sire of Saveuse. The dauphin arrived at the castle of the Archbishop of Reims in Sept-Saulx (located 21 km from Reims). The dauphin called on the people of Reims to open their gates, despite their vow to resist him for six weeks until relieved by Lancaster and Philip the Good. After negotiations and dinner, Charles VII entered and slept in Reims. That same day, René of Anjou brought homage from Lorraine and Barrois to the Dauphin.

== Consequences ==
On Sunday 17 July 1429 Charles VII was crowned King of France in Reims: he received the Holy Ampulla from the hands of the Archbishop Renault Chartres.

"Noble King, now is executed the pleasure of God who wished I lift the siege of Orléans, and I bring you into this city of Rheims to receive your holy coronation to show you are the true king, and the one to whom the kingdom of France must belong," declared Joan of Arc, paying tribute to her king.

The coronation ceremony, given the circumstances, took place in simplicity. The crown, the scepter, and the globe were still in English-held Saint-Denis. Only three of the spiritual peers attended the ceremony: the Archbishop of Reims Renault Chartres, the Bishop of Laon William of Champeaux, and the bishop of Châlons Jean Saarbrücken. But the eighth sacrament, the anointing of the king, gave him the sacred sign of legitimate power, and made him the rightful monarch, of the House of Valois, authentically appointed by God, unlike John of Lancaster, who was imposed by an enemy army and the irresponsible signature of a mad king.

== Commemoration ==
For the fifth centennial of the campaign, and in the context of the canonization of Joan of Arc, a series of plaques was mounted along the route that Joan followed to retake Reims and crown the king.

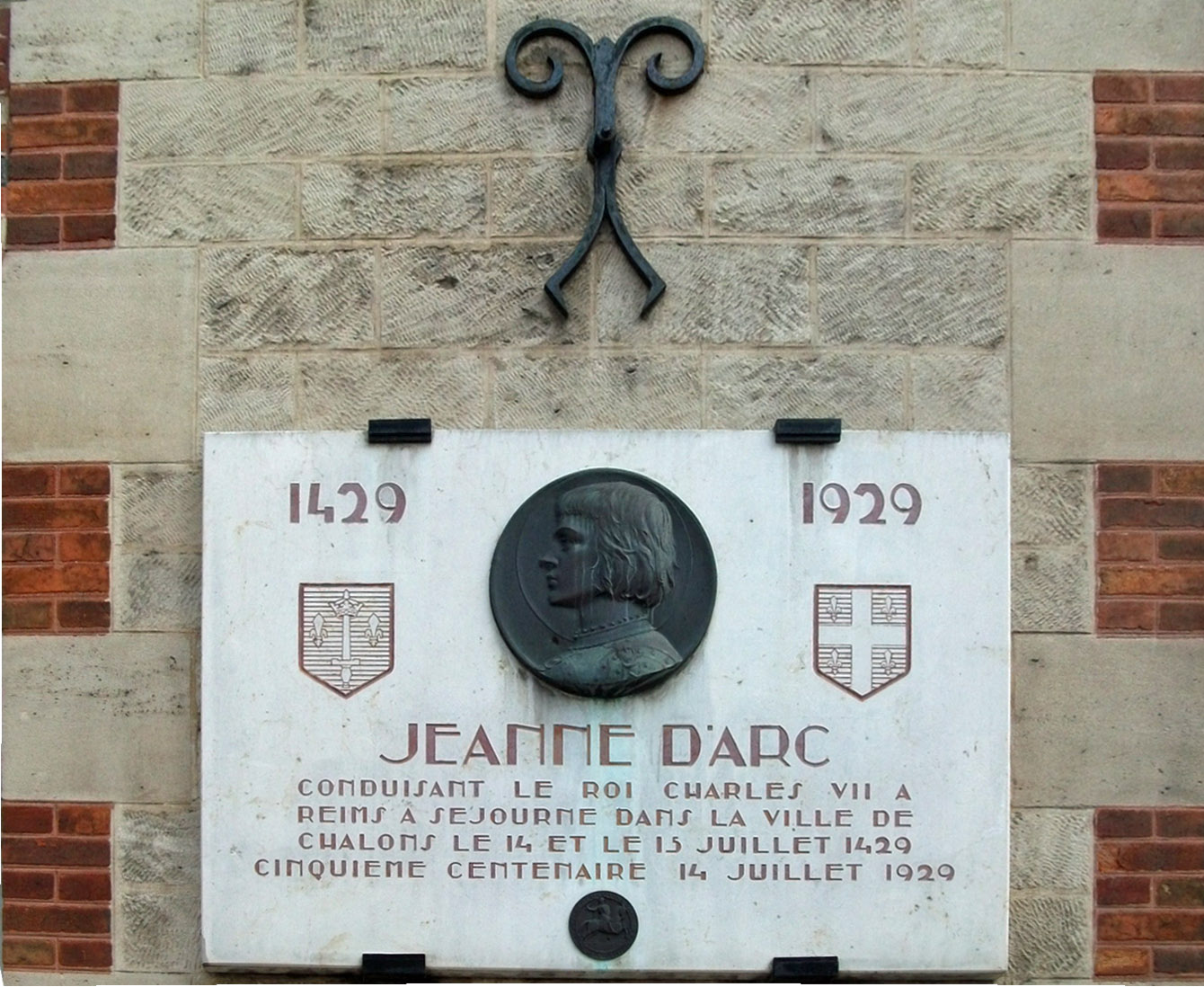
Châlons-sur-Marne,

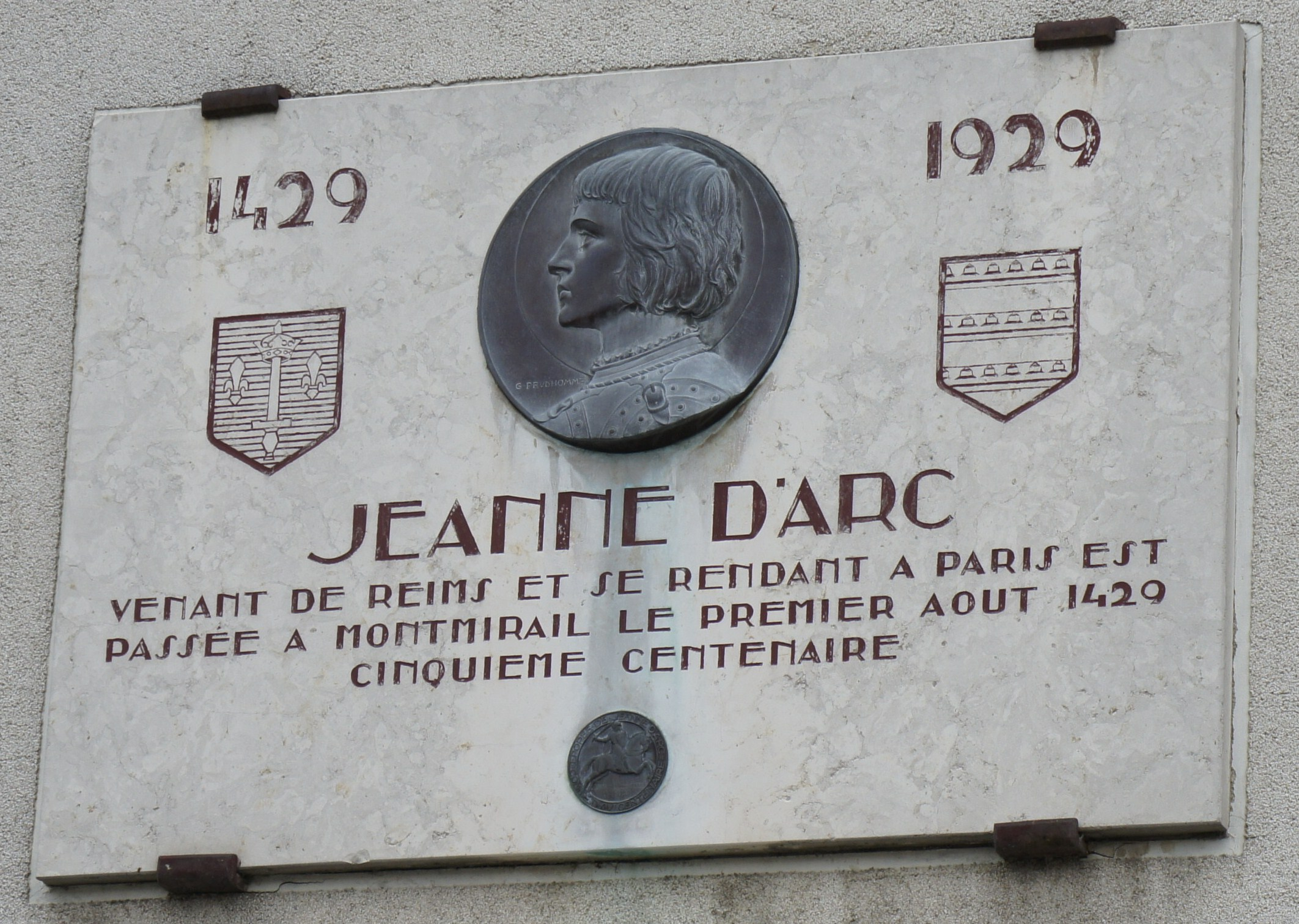
Montmirail,

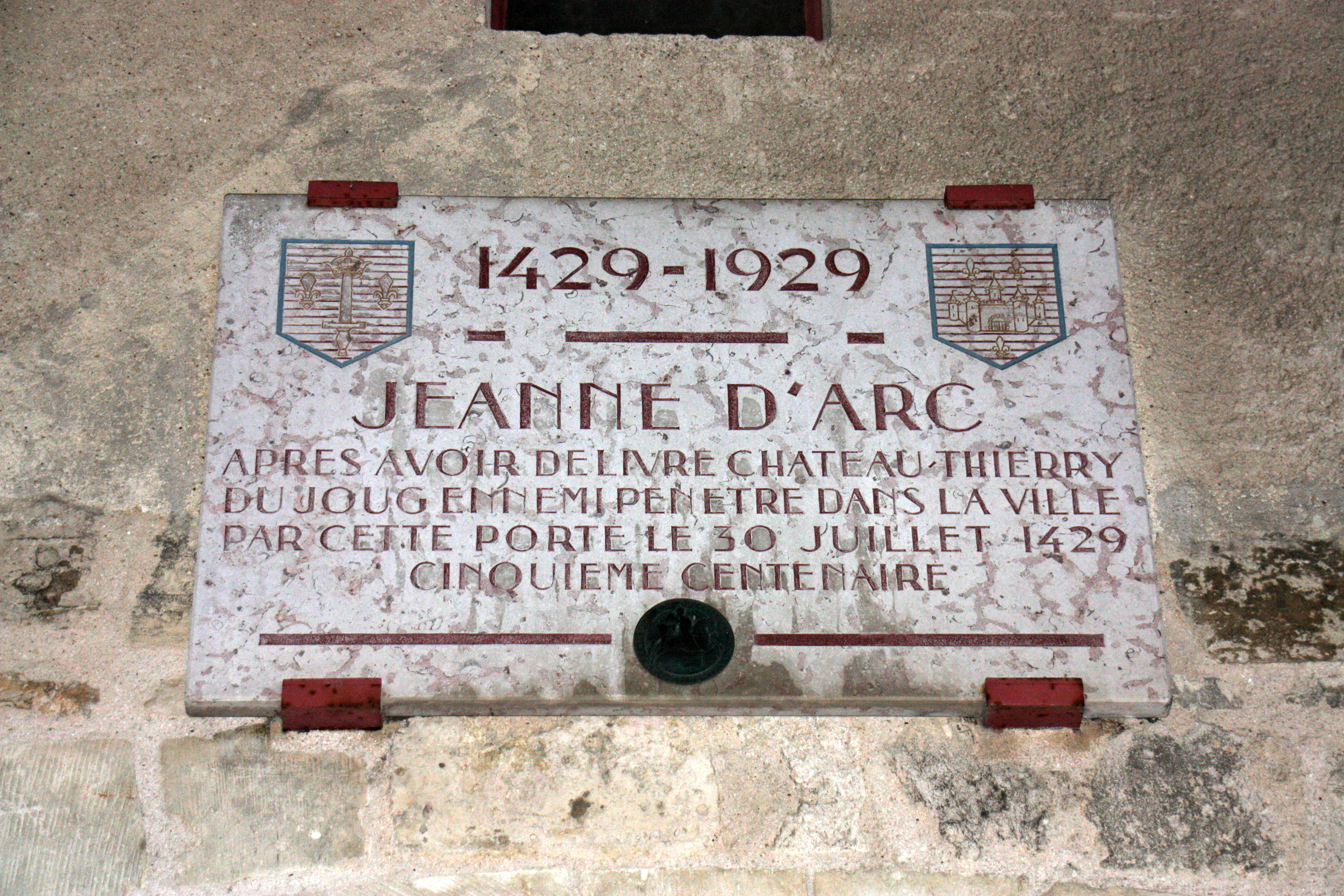
Château-Thierry,

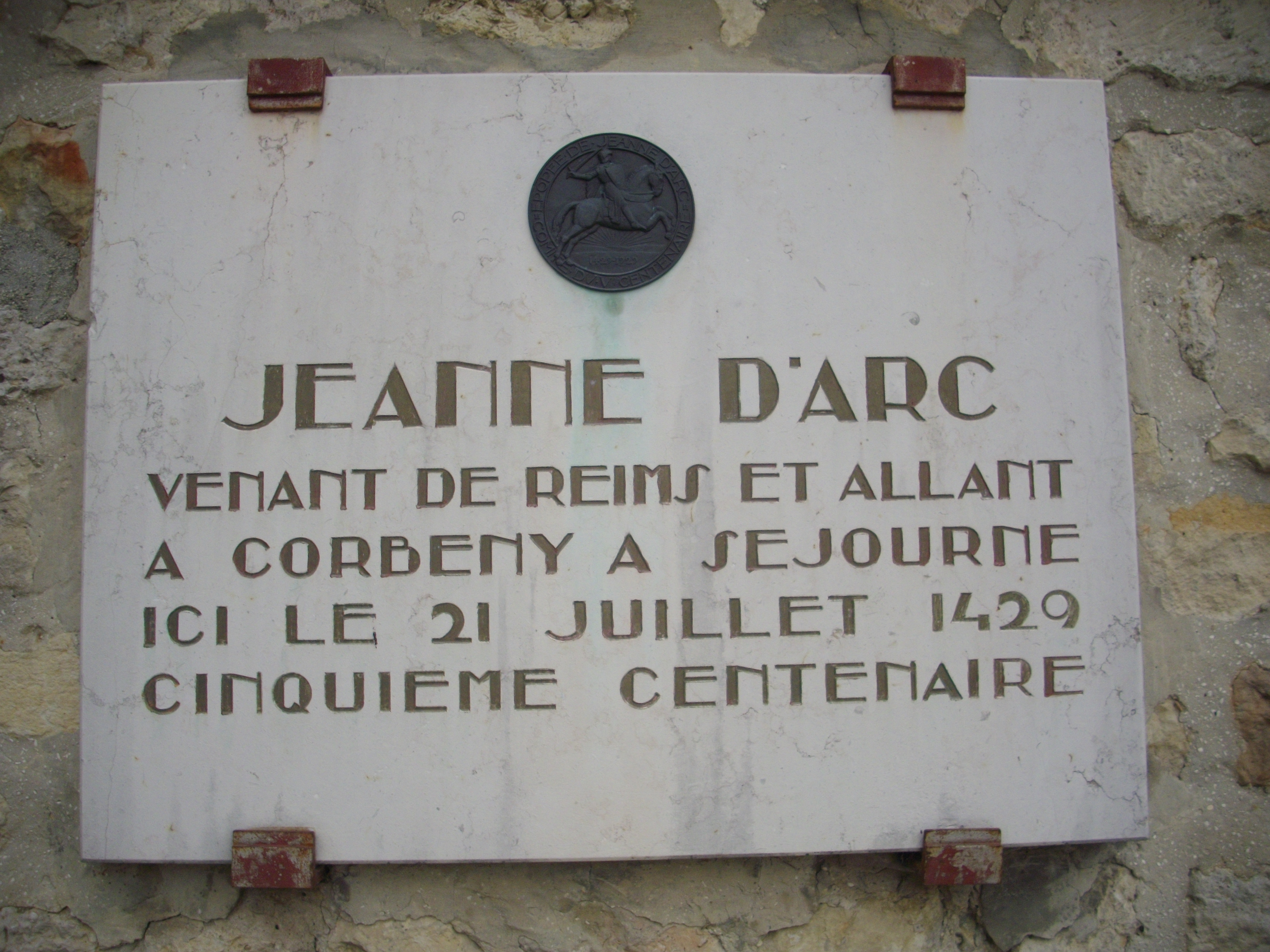
Cormicy,

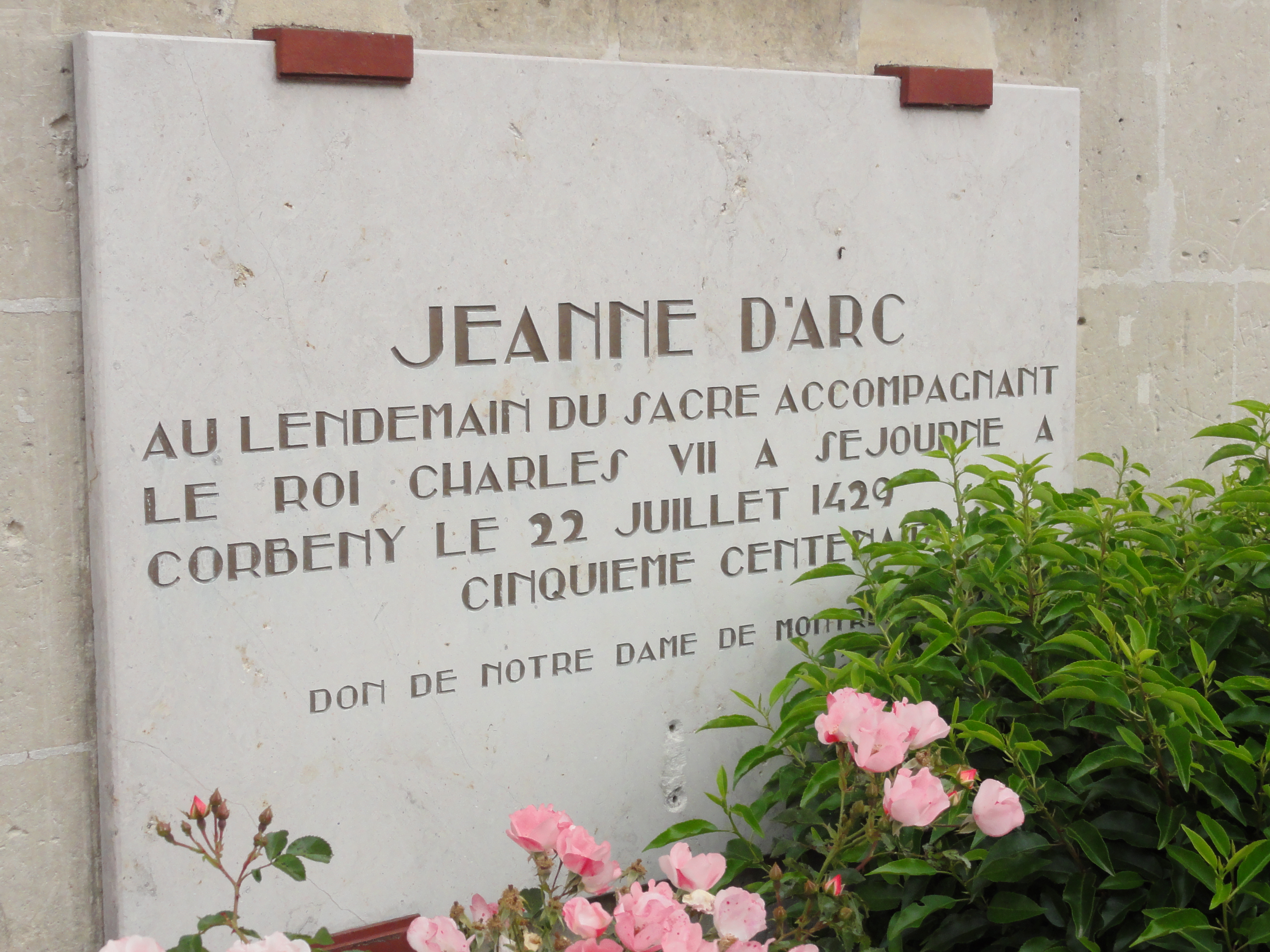
Corbeny,

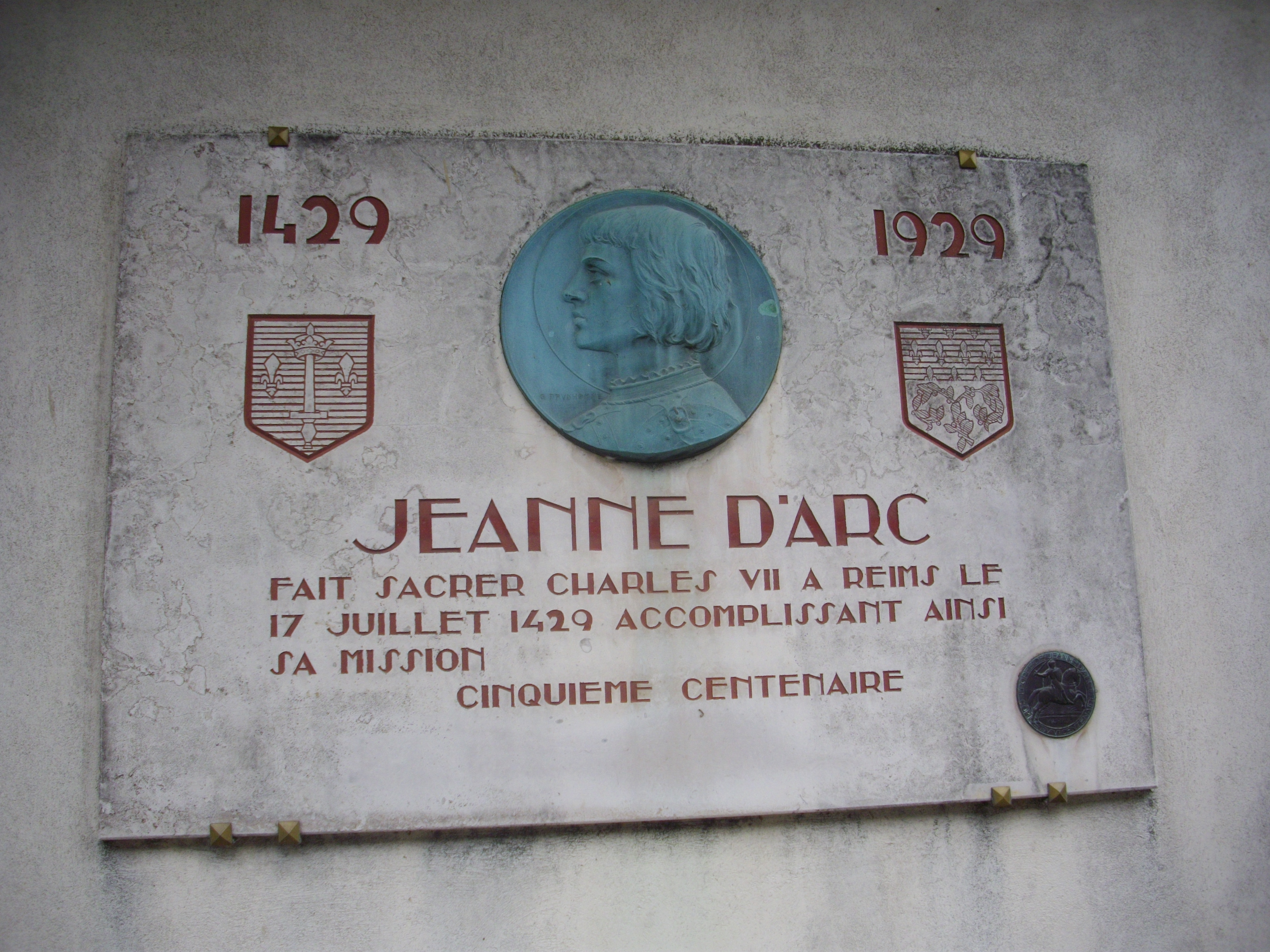
and Reims.

== Bibliography ==
- Bouzy, Olivier (2013). Jeanne d'Arc en son siècle [Joan of Arc in her Century] (in French). Paris: Fayard. p. 317. ISBN 978-2-213-67205-2. Archived from the original on 2015-11-25.
- Contamine, Philippe; Bouzy, Olivier; Hélary, Xavier (2012). Jeanne d'Arc. Histoire et dictionnaire [Joan of Arc: History and Dictionary] (in French). Paris: Robert Laffont. p. 1214. ISBN 978-2-221-10929-8.
- DeVries, Kelly (1999). Joan of Arc: A Military Leader. Stroud: Sutton Publishing. p. 242. ISBN 0-7509-1805-5.
- Lurie, Guy (August 2015). "Citizenship in Late Medieval Champagne: The Towns of Châlons, Reims, and Troyes, 1417–circa 1435". French Historical Studies. 38 (3): 365–390. doi:10.1215/00161071-2884627..
