= Praguerie =

Noble rebellion against Charles VII of France

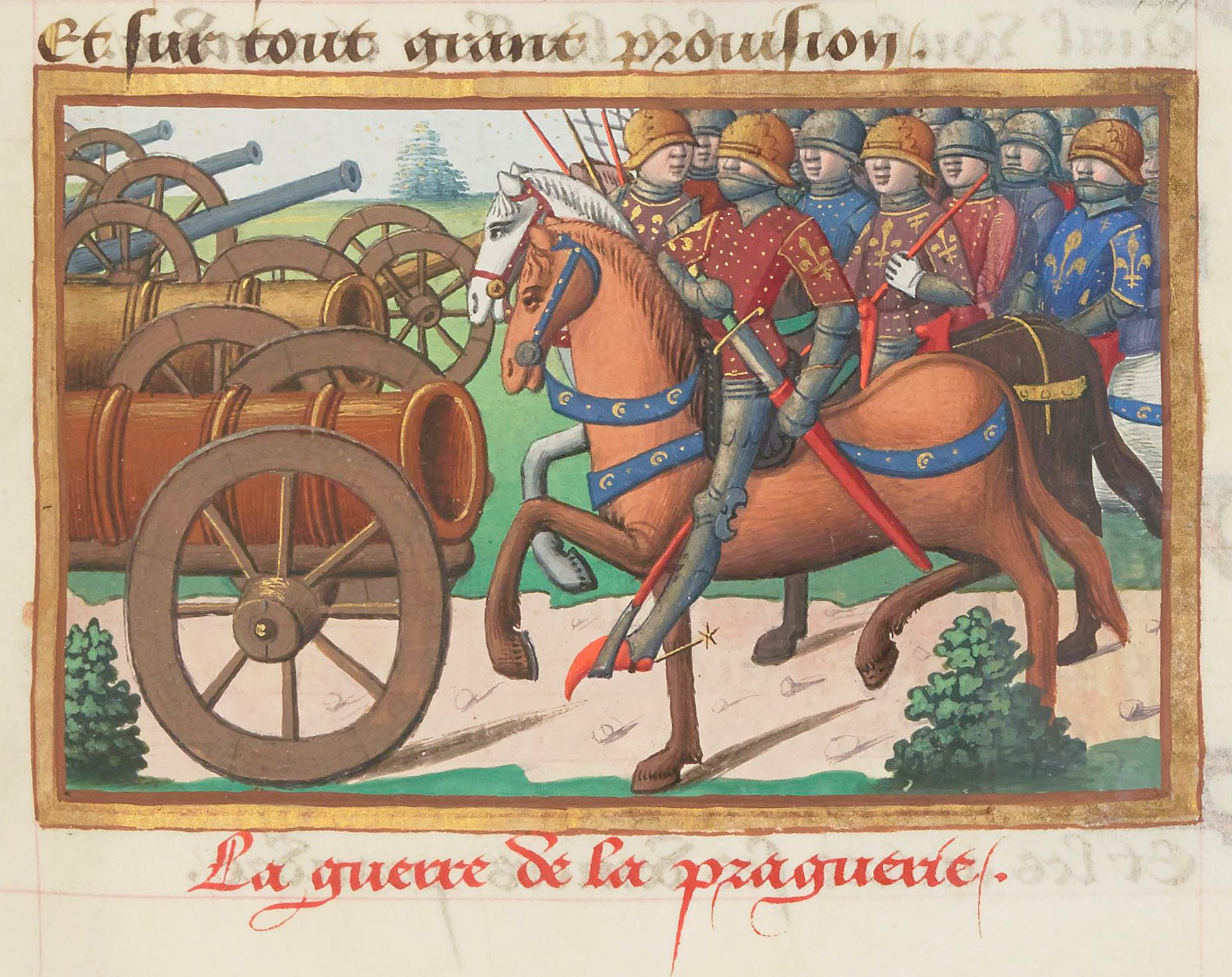
Illustration of the Praguerie of 1440 in Les Vigiles de Charles VII, manuscript by Martial d'Auvergne, circa 1484≈

The Praguerie (French pronunciation: [pʁaɡʁi]) was a revolt of the French nobility against King Charles VII from February to July 1440.

It was so named because of associations with the Hussite wars, i.e. the notion of an analogy which had recently taken place in Prague, Bohemia, at that time closely associated with France through the House of Luxembourg, kings of Bohemia. Its causes lay in the centralizing reforms of Charles VII at the close of the Hundred Years' War, a period of 'brigand-soldiery'. The ordinances passed by the estates of langue d'oïl at Orléans in 1439 not only gave the king an aid of 100,000 francs (an act which was later used by the king as though it were a perpetual grant and so freed him from that parliamentary control of the purse so important in England), but demanded as well royal nominations to officerships in the army, marking a gain in the royal prerogative which the nobility resolved to challenge.

The main instigator was Charles I, Duke of Bourbon, who three years before had attempted a similar rising, and had been forced to ask pardon of the king. He and his illegitimate brother, John, were joined by the former favourite Georges de la Tremoille, John V, Duke of Brittany, who allied himself with the English, the Duke of Alençon, the Count of Vendôme, and mercenaries captains like Rodrigo de Villandrando, Antoine de Chabannes, or Jean de la Roche. The Duke of Bourbon won over the Dauphin Louis—afterwards King Louis XI—then only sixteen years old, and proposed to set aside the king in his favour, making him regent.

Louis was readily induced to rebel; but the country was saved from a serious civil war by the energy of the king's officers and the solid loyalty of his "good cities". The Constable of France, Arthur de Richemont, marched with the king's troops into Poitou, his old battleground with de la Tremoille, and in two months he had subdued the country. The royal artilleries of Jean Bureau battered down the feudal strongholds. The Dauphin and the Duke of Alençon failed to bring about any sympathetic rising in Auvergne, and the Praguerie was over, except for some final pillaging and plundering in Saintonge and Poitou, which the royal army failed to prevent.

Charles then attempted to ensure the loyalty of the Duke of Bourbon by the gift of a large pension, forgave all the rebellious gentry, and installed his son in Dauphiné. The ordinance of Orleans was enforced. The Dauphin was forced to beg his father's forgiveness.
