= Château de Saint-Fargeau =

Castle in Burgundy region of France

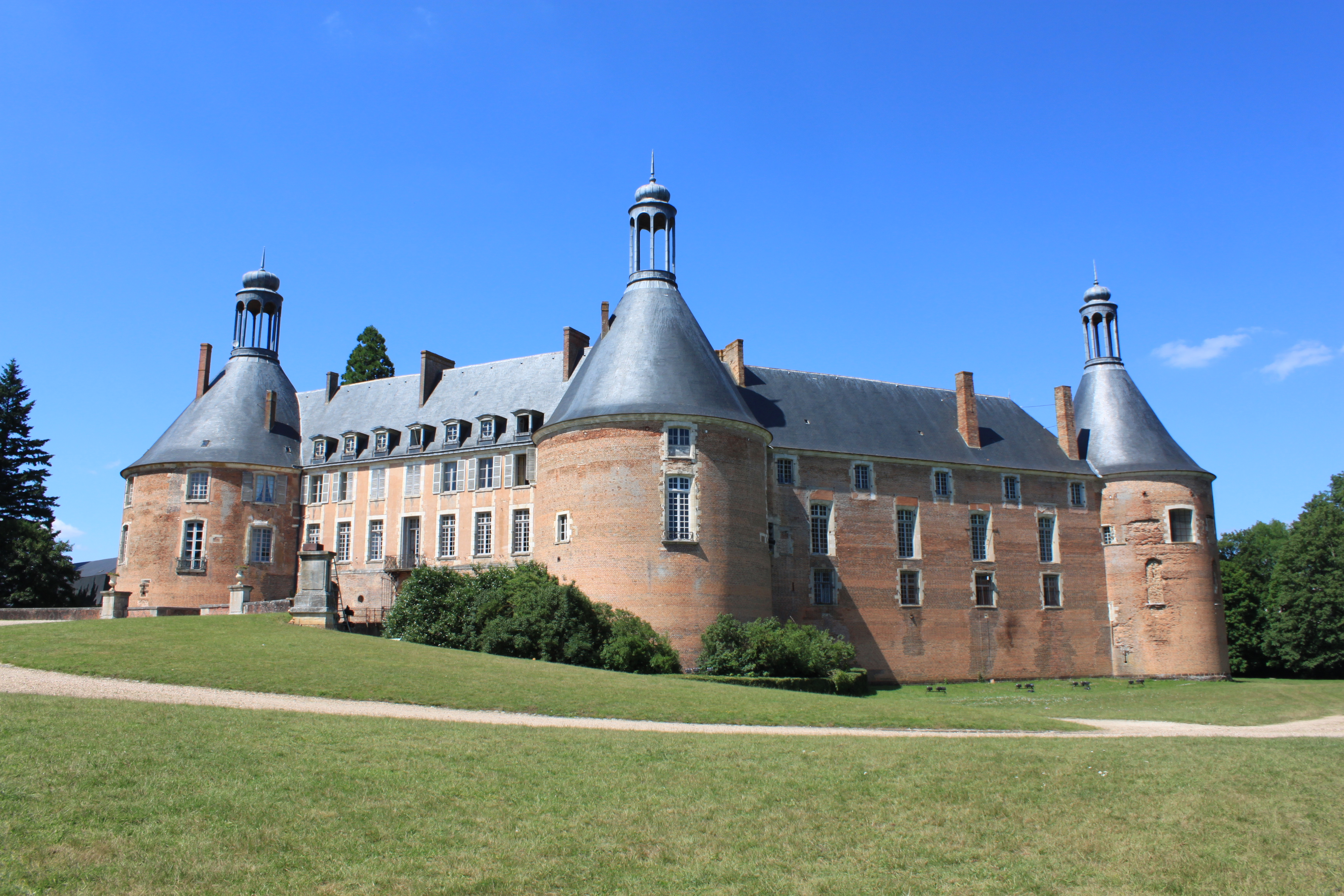
- Château de Saint-Fargeau

- Location within France
- 47°38′22″N 3°04′19″E

History
- Built: 980
- Built for: Antoine de Chabannes
- Demolished: 17th century (by fire)
- Rebuilt: 17th, 19th and 20th century

Site notes
- Architectural style: Renaissance
- Current use: Tourist attraction & hotel
- Owner: Michel Guyot
- Website: http://www.chateau-de-st-fargeau.com/en/chateau.php

Monument historique
- Designated: 1924

Château de Saint-Fargeau is a 17th-century, Renaissance château located in the commune of Saint-Fargeau in the department of Yonne, in the Burgundy region of France.

In the 10th century, before the construction of the current castle, the château was originally a hunting residence. This was destroyed in the 15th century, and a castle was built on its foundations. This castle was destroyed by fire and replaced by the current castle in the 17th century, with additions and major improvements made in the 19th and 20th centuries.

The Château de Saint-Fargeau has a distinctive design. From above, the château's curtains and towers form an irregular pentagon, the corners of which are formed by six towers of pink brick. Five of the towers are topped with lanterns. The château was designated as a monument historique in 1945 and has been open to the public since.

== History ==
Originally, Saint-Fargeau was a fortified hunting residence, built in 980 by Héribert, bishop of Auxerre, and natural son of Hugh the Great and brother of Hugues Capet. The first known lord of the castle was Ithier, lord of Toucy in c. 1060. In 1411, there was a siege of the residence, then lands passed to Louis de Bar, bishop of Verdun and cardinal, who bequeathed them in 1430 to his nephew Jean-Jacques, Marquis of Montferrat.

On February 11, 1450, his sons Jean, Guillaume and Boniface sold "the lands and châtellenies of Saint-Fargeau" to Jacques Cœur. After the downfall of Jacques Coeur, the castle was sold to Antoine de Chabannes, Earl of Dammartin, Grand Master of France, and in 1453, a castle was built on the foundations of the old residence. He began, in 1467, by building the large tower, destined to serve as a retreat until the complete reconstruction of the château, the tower of which would later become the keep. Since Antoine was a supporter and comrade-in-arms to Joan of Arc, the castle was heavily fortified.

In 1461, Louis XI became king. He took revenge on Antoine de Chabannes for past wrongs by returning Saint-Fargeau to the Cœur family and by arresting Chabannes. His son, Jean Chabannes, later purchased the castle and the grounds from Coeur family for 10,000 gold crowns. The castle was then passed down his family for several generations until Henri de Bourbon, was the father-in-law of Gaston d'Orleans, brother of Louis XIII and father of the Duchesse de Montpensier.

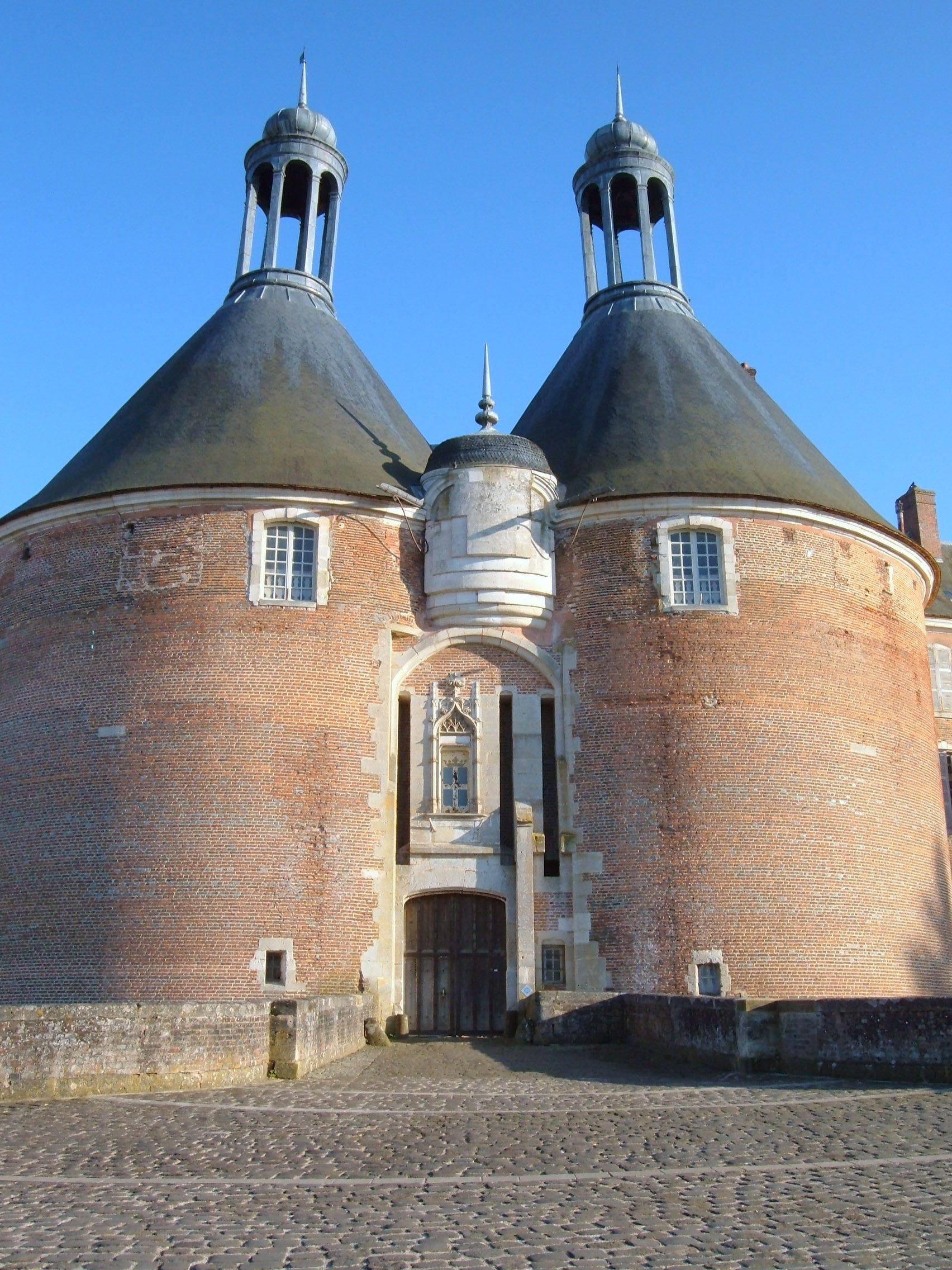
Entrance of the castle

In 1541, Nicolas d'Anjou transformed Saint-Fargeau into a royal residence. He created the facade that connected the large tower to the two towers of the entrance. Several generation later, the first cousin of Louis XIV, Anne Marie Louise d'Orléans, Duchess of Montpensier, (also known as La Grande Mademoiselle) was exiled to Saint-Fargeau because of her position during the Fronde. The castle was redesigned by the King's architect, Francois Le Vau, and between 1653 and 1657, the four internal facades of the castle were altered to a more Classical style. The duchess's (secret) husband and heir, Antonin Nompar de Caumont, 1st Duke of Lauzun sold the castle in 1714.

A wing called "des Forts" was added in 1714, under the ownership of Michel-Robert Le Peletier des Forts (1675-1740), later Count of Saint-Fargeau. He later built a portrait studio in 1727 to commemorate his appointment as Comptroller General (1726-1730).

In 1752, a fire destroyed the interior as well as the two houses adjoining the chapel, the old apartments of La Grande Mademoiselle, the gallery and the guards' room, which was the largest in France at the time of its creation. The exterior walls were all that remained. Still under the ownership of Le Peletier des Forts, the family restored the building.

In 1809, Le Peletier de Mortefontaine created an English-style landscaped park that has survived. The estate at the time spanned three departments over some 15,000 hectares.

In the 19th century, "two bodies of buildings were converted into dormitories, one of which consisted mostly of guest-rooms, which were given hunters in winter by the guests," a period which was evoked by the vast "truly grandiose dining room. The dome ceiling is beautifully decorated with an eagle with outstretched wings, high and severe woodwork", and some reproductions of old photographs exhibited in the room of the Gardes. Later in the nineteenth century, four large round and oval lawns in the Court of Honoor were created and decorated."

In 1949, the château was classified as a monument historique. This included the façades, the exterior and the courtyard, the roofs, the moat and the park.

In the 1960s the château was owned by the Ormesson family. In 1974, the award-winning author Jean d'Ormesson published his book, Au plaisir de Dieu, wherein he wrote about his childhood experiences at the castle. A copy of his book remains on display at the château.

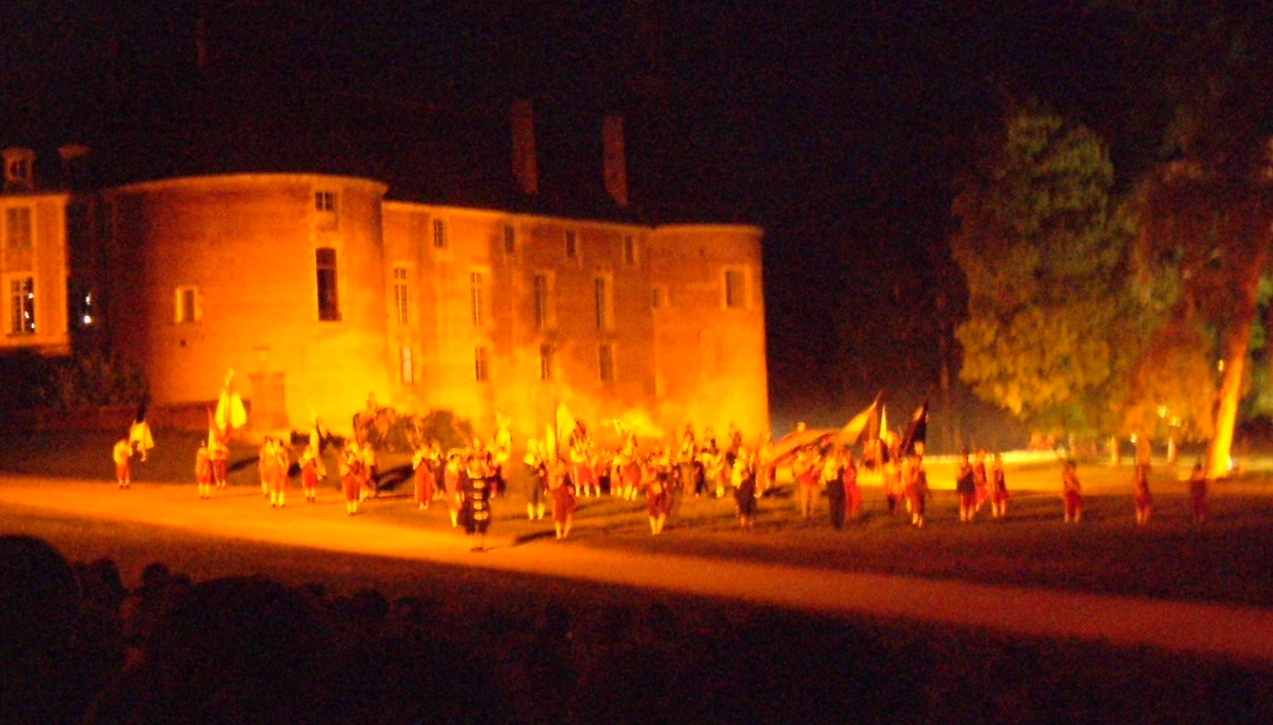
Historic reenactment at Château de Saint-Fargeau

In 1977, Michel Guyot and his brother Jacques, supported by the local authorities, acquired the château and its estate and undertook to restore it and bring it back to life. The restoration efforts were successful and the château has become a popular tourist attraction. Some rooms in the private part of the château, which have preserved their old decoration, are rented to the public. The restored areas of the Château de Saint-Fargeau are also open to the public. There is also a sound and light show organized by the association "Les Amis du Château de Saint-Fargeau" to raise funds for additional restorations. It lasts two hours and traces more than 1,000 years of "History through Joan of Arc and the French Revolution". This production has taken place for more than 25 years and involves over 700 actors and 50 horseback riders from the surrounding community. As of 2016, Michel Guyot is still the owner of the chateau and has gone on to establish the Guédelon Castle project.

== Description ==
The château is a mixture of 15th and 17th century architecture. The curtains and towers form an irregular pentagon, the corners of which are formed by six pink-brick towers, five of which are capped with lanterns. The biggest and oldest of the six towers is the original Moulin (mill) tower, also known as the Jacques Cœur tower, that has oval diameters from 24 to 36 meters. This tower was also deliberately built to lean inwards in order to more effectively channel rainwater to the storage vessels within the castle. The Twin Towers at the entrance are known as the towers of Bar and Toucy.

Classics facades were introduced to the château by François Le Vau, one of the architects of the Château de Versailles. He created unique designs into the walls, staircase and dome using various sized brick and stone.

== See also ==
- List of castles in France
