= Gaspard Bureau =

Gaspard Bureau (died 1469) was a French ballistics expert and inventor, as well as lord of Montfermeil, Nogent-sur-Marne, Villemomble and other places. He was a brother of the artillery commander Jean Bureau.

== Life ==
Gaspard was the third son of Simon Bureau the Younger (Le Jeune), a merchant from Paris, and his wife Hélène. Jean and Gaspard joined Charles VII of France's army together in 1436. Gaspard was part of its financial administration as master of accounts, later becoming clerk of the artillery then temporary master of artillery in 1442. On 27 December 1444 he succeeded Pierre Bessonneau as grand-master of the king's artillery. He was ennobled by royal letters patent in October 1447.

Gaspard and John developed France's field artillery, standardising its calibre and switching it from wrought iron to cast iron. This gave the French army a decisive advantage over the English and helped bring an end to the Hundred Years' War. Gaspard took part in the 1450 siege of Bayeux and the battle of Castillon in 1453. On 21 March 1445 he bought the lordship of Villemomble from Francis I, Duke of Brittany for 9,000 livres tournois. He was made marquis of Castillon then a knight in 1464. He finally became captain of Beauté, Le Louvre and Poissy between 1463 and 1465.

== Marriage and issue ==
He first married around 1440, to Guarix Burelle, with whom he had no children. His second marriage was around 1450, to Richarde de Vérines, with whom he had three daughters:

- Jeanne Bureau, married Jean de Marcirion, lord of La Tombe
- Marguerite Bureau, married twice 1)Yves de Carnazet; 2) Charles de Buz.
- Gérarde (alias Gasparde) Bureau, lady of Douy and of La Ramée, married twice 1) Robert de Châtillon, lord of Bry-sur-Marne; 2) Pierre de Meaux.

== Sources ==
- (in French) Genealogy of the Bureau family
