= Saint-Fargeau =

- Commune
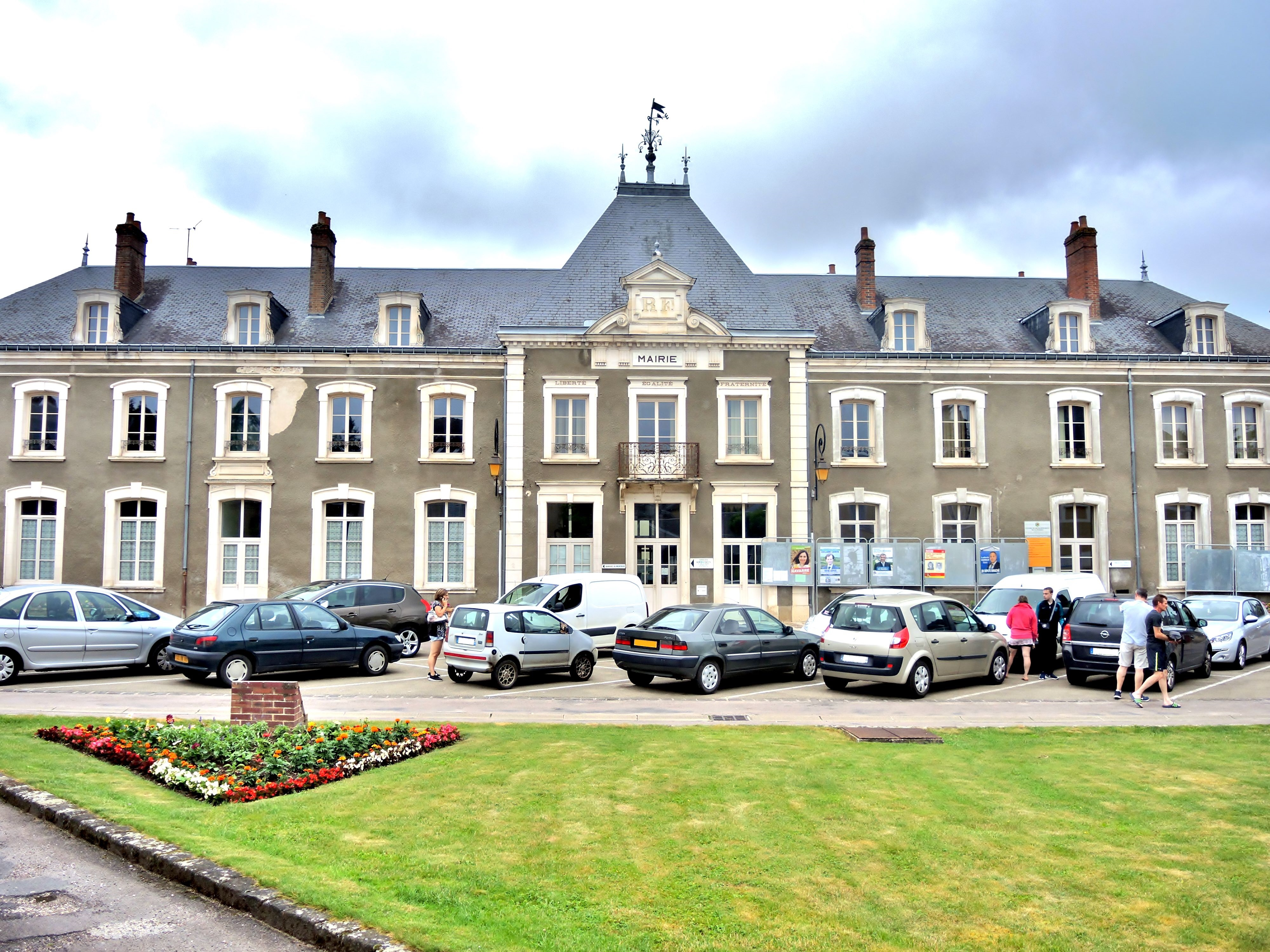
- The town hall in Saint-Fargeau

- Coat of arms
- Location of Saint-Fargeau
- Location within France Location within Bourgogne-Franche-Comté
- Coordinates: 47°38′30″N 3°04′19″E
- Country: France
- Region: Bourgogne-Franche-Comté
- Department: Yonne
- Arrondissement: Auxerre
- Canton: Cœur de Puisaye
- Intercommunality: Puisaye-Forterre

Government
  - Mayor (2020–2026): Dominique Charpentier
- Area^{1}: 67.20 km^{2} (25.95 sq mi)
- Elevation: 215 m (705 ft)
- Highest elevation: 280 m (920 ft)
- Lowest elevation: 182 m (597 ft)
- Population (2023): 1,439
  - Density: 21.41/km^{2} (55.46/sq mi)
- Time zone: UTC+01:00 (CET)
  - Summer (DST): UTC+02:00 (CEST)
- INSEE/Postal code: 89344 /89170
- ^{1} French Land Register data, which excludes lakes, ponds, glaciers > 1 km^{2} (0.386 sq mi or 247 acres) and river estuaries.

Saint-Fargeau is a commune in the Yonne department in Bourgogne-Franche-Comté in north-central France, in the historical region of Puisaye.

== Main sights ==
- Saint-Ferréol church, built in Gothic style in the 14th and 15th centuries. Notable burials: heart of Antoine de Chabannes, whose body was laid to rest in Dammartin-en-Goële; burials of his wife Marguerite de Nanteuil (ca. 1422-1475), and of his son and successor Jean de Chabannes (1462-1503).
- Château de Saint-Fargeau (Saint-Fargeau Castle) mostly built in the 15th and 17th centuries.
- Musée de l'Aventure du Son (Museum of Sound Discovery) displaying more than 1000 gramophones, radios and mechanical musical instruments.

== Personalities ==
- Saint Fargeau, or Ferreolus, (died c. 212), an early Christian martyr
- Antoine de Chabannes, a significant figure of France's 15th-century history, acquired Saint-Fargeau and other lands in Puisaye previously held by the disgraced Jacques Coeur. He reconstructed the castle in the late 1460s and made other investments in the town, including the foundation of a hospital.
- In the early years of the reign of Louis XIV, the château was the home to his exiled cousin, the wealthy Anne Marie Louise d'Orléans. She lived in the château of the town, giving the building its present appearance. The building also has her monogram over its main entrance. She held the title of duchesse de Saint-Fargeau in her own right. A fire in 1752 and further damage in 1850 has largely destroyed the original building.
- Lucie Bérillon
- Jean d'Ormesson - a French novelist, mostly writing partially or totally autobiographic novels. He was brought up at the château and was born in 1925.
- Robert Gall 1918 - 1990 - was a French lyricist.

== See also ==
- Communes of the Yonne department
