= Pierre Bessonneau =

French commander

Pierre Bessonneau was a French commander of the Hundred Years' War.

His father was a squire of Louis I of Anjou and Pierre also became a squire, this time to the dauphin Charles (the future Charles VII of France). In 1427 he took part in the defence of Pontorson. He took part in the Siege of Orléans (1428–29) as master general and overseer of the king's artillery. He was present at Charles' coronation at Reims on 17 July 1429. In 1434 he was back in the entourage of Louis of Anjou. On 27 December 1444 he was replaced as master of the artillery by Gaspard Bureau.

== Sources ==
- Georges Minois, Charles VII
