= Jean Bureau =

French artillery commander (c. 1390–1463)

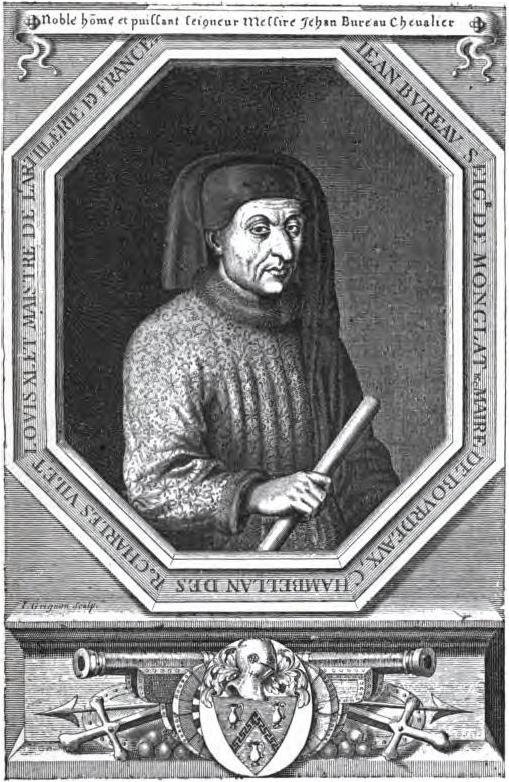
- Bureau, portrait by Jacques Grignon (c. 17th century
- Born: 1390; Semoine, Champagne, Kingdom of France
- Died: 1463 (aged 72–73)
- Occupations: Artillery commander, military officer
- Known for: Reforms to the French artillery force

Bureau's coat-of-arms

Jean Bureau (c. 1390 – 1463) was a French artillery commander active primarily during the later years of the Hundred Years' War. Along with his brother, Gaspard, he is credited with making French artillery the most effective in the world. As Master Gunner of Artillery in the armies of Charles VII, Bureau acquired a reputation as an effective artillery officer during the Normandy campaign (1449–1450), when his bombardments helped capture the towns of Rouen, Harfleur, and Honfleur, and aided in the French victory at Formigny. Bureau commanded the victorious French army at the decisive Battle of Castillon in 1453.

== Early life and campaigns ==
Bureau was born in Semoine, Champagne, the second son of Simon Bureau, a merchant, and his wife, Hélène. In 1420, he moved to Paris to work as a lawyer. He was a legal official at the Châtelet during the occupation of Paris by the Duke of Bedford.

Described as a "perfectionist with a methodical, mathematical mind" and "an imaginative technician who knew how to get the best out of his primitive weapons", Bureau likely learned the artillery trade for its commercial potential. The Bureau brothers were aided by innovations in the manufacture of gunpowder in the late 1420s that generated a more potent powder that could fire projectiles at a much greater velocity and did not require mixing in the field. Simultaneously, innovations in casting helped create stronger barrels that were less likely to explode.

In 1434, the Bureaus offered their services to Charles VII, and quickly asserted themselves as artillery experts. Jean was appointed "governor of the French archers" and Gaspard was appointed "master of ordnance", and by 1439, Jean was the Master Gunner of the French Artillery. Jean was also appointed "Receiver of Paris" in 1436, "Treasurer of France" in 1443, and mayor of La Rochelle in 1448.

The Bureaus' artillery had an immediate impact, aiding the French in the sieges of Montereau (1437), Meaux (1439), Saint-Germain-en-Laye (1440), and Pontoise (1441). The Bureaus helped suppress the Praguerie rebellion against Charles in 1440.

== Later campaigns ==
When the Treaty of Tours (which had established a truce between England and France) ended in 1449, Charles VII launched a campaign to retake Normandy in northern France. Bombardments by the Bureaus' artillery aided in the capture of Rouen (October 1449), Harfleur (December 1449), Honfleur (January 1450), and Fresnoy (January 1450). To ensure a continuous bombardment of English-held Cherbourg, the Bureaus placed their guns below the high water mark on the town's seaward side, leaving them submerged during high tide, and returning to resume the bombardment during low tide.

On 15 April 1450, a French force led by the Duke of Bourbon clashed with an English force sent to relieve the beleaguered region at the Battle of Formigny. The French initially attempted to charge the English position, but were driven back by English longbowmen. The Bureaus then advanced two cannons (likely two breechloading culverins), and barraged the English position. The barrage was effective, particularly since the cannons had a greater range than English longbows, but the French failed to provide protection for the cannons, and the English were able to charge and capture them. Cavalry reinforcements arrived later in the day to seal a decisive victory for the French, which paved the way for the capture of the remaining English strongholds in Normandy.

In 1451, the Bureaus joined the French invasion of Gascony, in southwestern France, and were instrumental in the recapture of several cities, including Bordeaux, which surrendered in June. Jean Bureau was appointed Mayor of Bordeaux in August 1451, but the local Gascon population revolted against the new leaders and invited the English to return. In October 1452, the Earl of Shrewsbury, Sir John Talbot, reoccupied Bordeaux with an English force of 3,000. Within a few months, he had regained control of much of the Gascony region.

The French launched their campaign to retake Gascony in the Spring of 1453. Bureau, now leading an army of about 7,000, laid siege to the town of Castillon, east of Bordeaux. He deployed 300 cannon in fortified field defenses on the town's perimeter. Remembering the loss of his cannons at Formigny, he attached a force of archers in the woods adjacent to his position to protect the cannons from capture. Talbot arrived with a relief force on 17 July, and routed a small advanced force of French archers. Mistakenly believing the French were retreating, he attacked the French camp, and his army was decimated by Bureau's cannon fire. Talbot's horse was hit by a cannonball, and he was killed by a French archer shortly after.

Bureau proceeded to Bordeaux, which he surrounded with 250 artillery pieces. After a 10-week siege, Bordeaux sent a delegation to Charles VII asking for terms of surrender. Bureau, confident in the positions of his batteries, told the king, "I promise you on my life that in a few days I shall have demolished the town." Hearing this statement, the delegation agreed to accept Charles' harsh terms, and control of the town was turned over to the French on 19 October 1453.

== Later life ==
After the war, Bureau was ennobled as the Lord of Montglas. He was knighted in 1461. He and his brother continued to serve as advisors to Charles' son and successor, Louis XI, even though Louis dismissed most of Charles' staff. Bureau died in 1463.
