= Château de Blanquefort =

Coordinates: 44°54′04″N 0°37′48″W

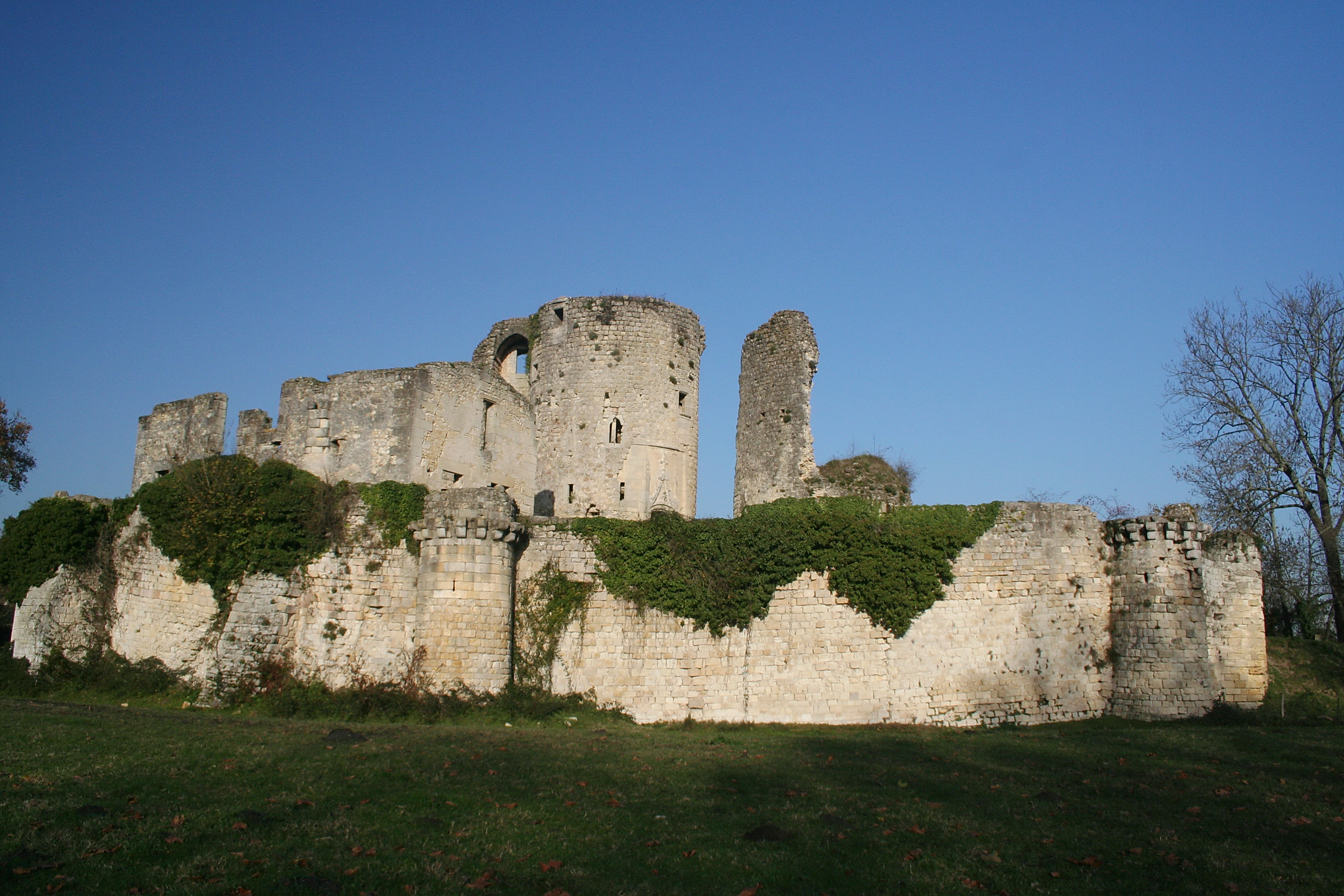
Château de Blanquefort

Château de Blanquefort is a ruined castle in Blanquefort, Gironde, Nouvelle-Aquitaine, France.
