= Ronchères =

Ronchères may refer to the following places in France:

- Ronchères, Aisne, a commune in the department of Aisne
- Ronchères, Yonne, a commune in the department of Yonne
- Sons-et-Ronchères, a commune in the department of Aisne
