= Verziau of Gargantua =

Standing stone in Bois-lès-Pargny, France

Coordinates: 49.750991°N 3.654529°E

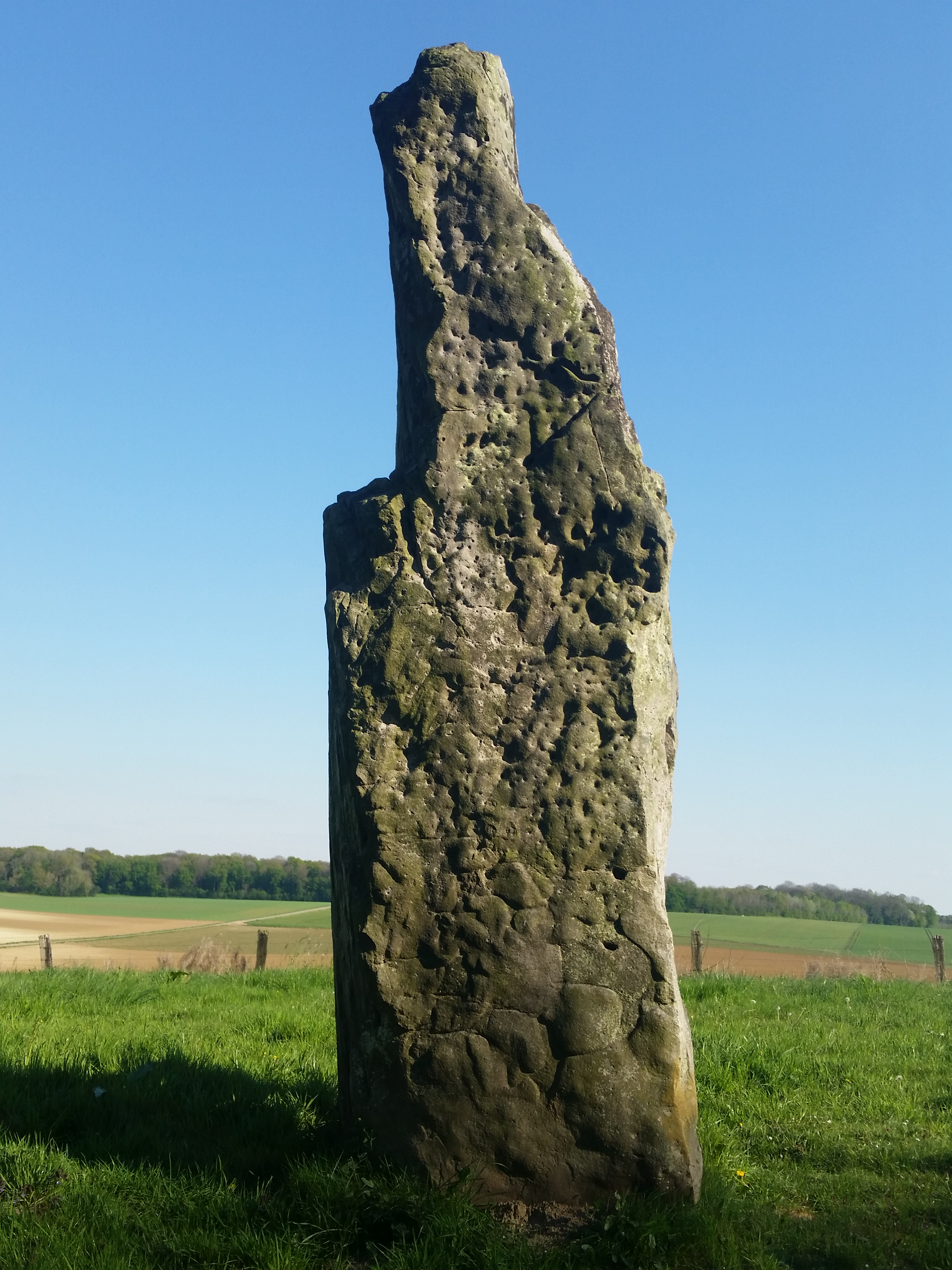
Le Verziau de Gargantua at Bois-lès-Pargny

The verziau of Gargantua (or vierzeux of Gargantua), also known as Haute-Borne, is a menhir at Bois-lès-Pargny in Aisne, France.

== Description ==
This is a monolith of hard sandstone 4.35 meters high and 1.50 m wide. This stone is chipped at the top, retains its base width to about half of its height, and tapers to its upper end, just over a meter wide

== Location ==
The menhir is north of the town of Bois-lès-Pargny, a few meters from a small copse, near Sons-et-Ronchères.

== History ==
At the beginning of the 19th century, the menhir had a twin sister, which was destroyed to extract a large amount of sandstone. It is claimed that the depth of the menhir below the ground is the same as its above-ground height, giving a total height of 9 meters. It is likely that this menhir came from the nearby forest of Berjaumont, where the blocks of sandstone are quite numerous. It must have been rolled onto this hill by a large number of men. Legend has it that a man of immense size was using it to sharpen his scythe, and left the rock on the site in a gesture of anger.

The monument was listed as a monument historique in 1889.

== Appendices ==
=== See also ===
- Gargantua
