= Concours des villes et villages fleuris =

Annual French contest

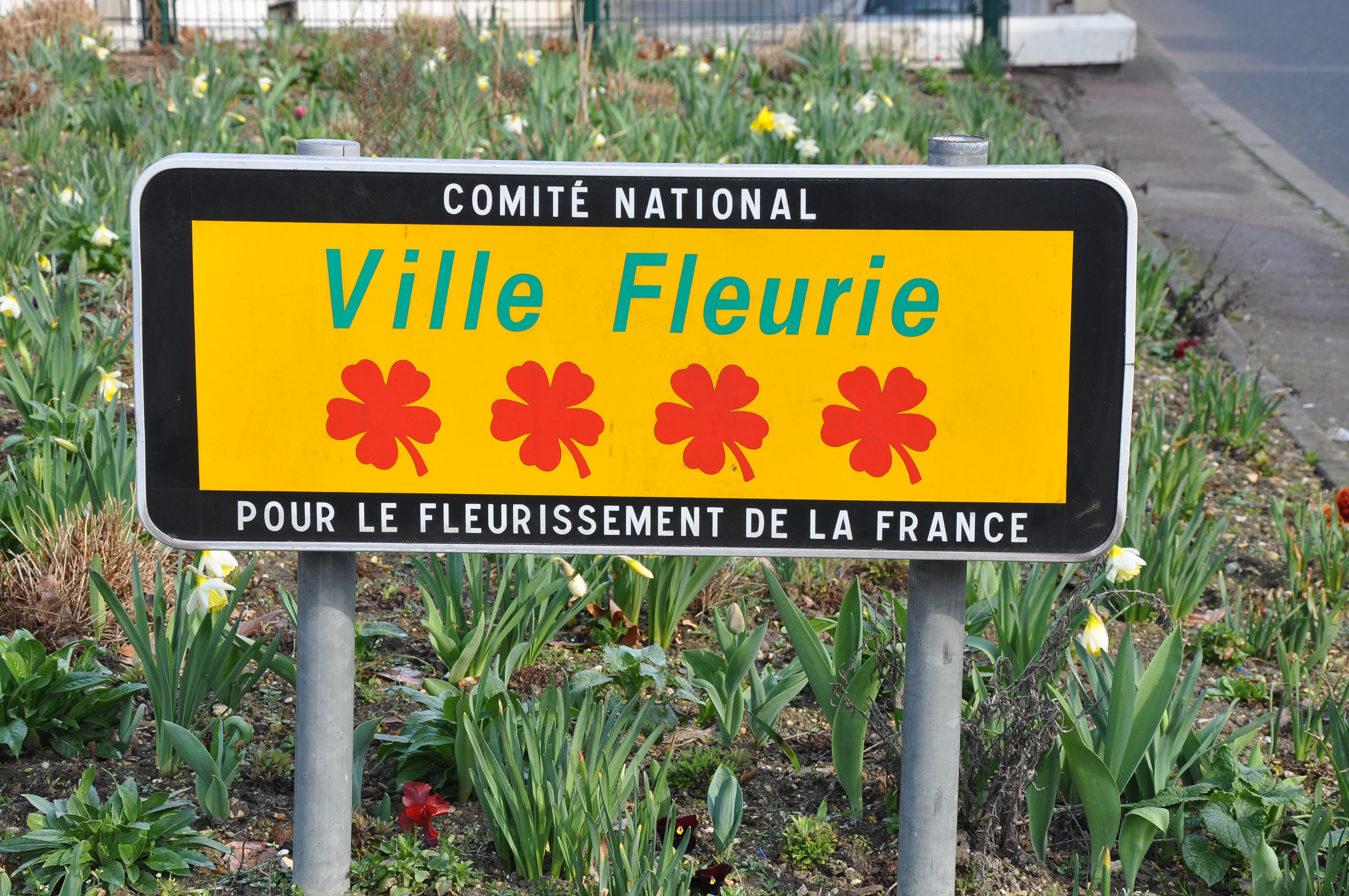
Sign in Le Vésinet, Yvelines (4 flowers)

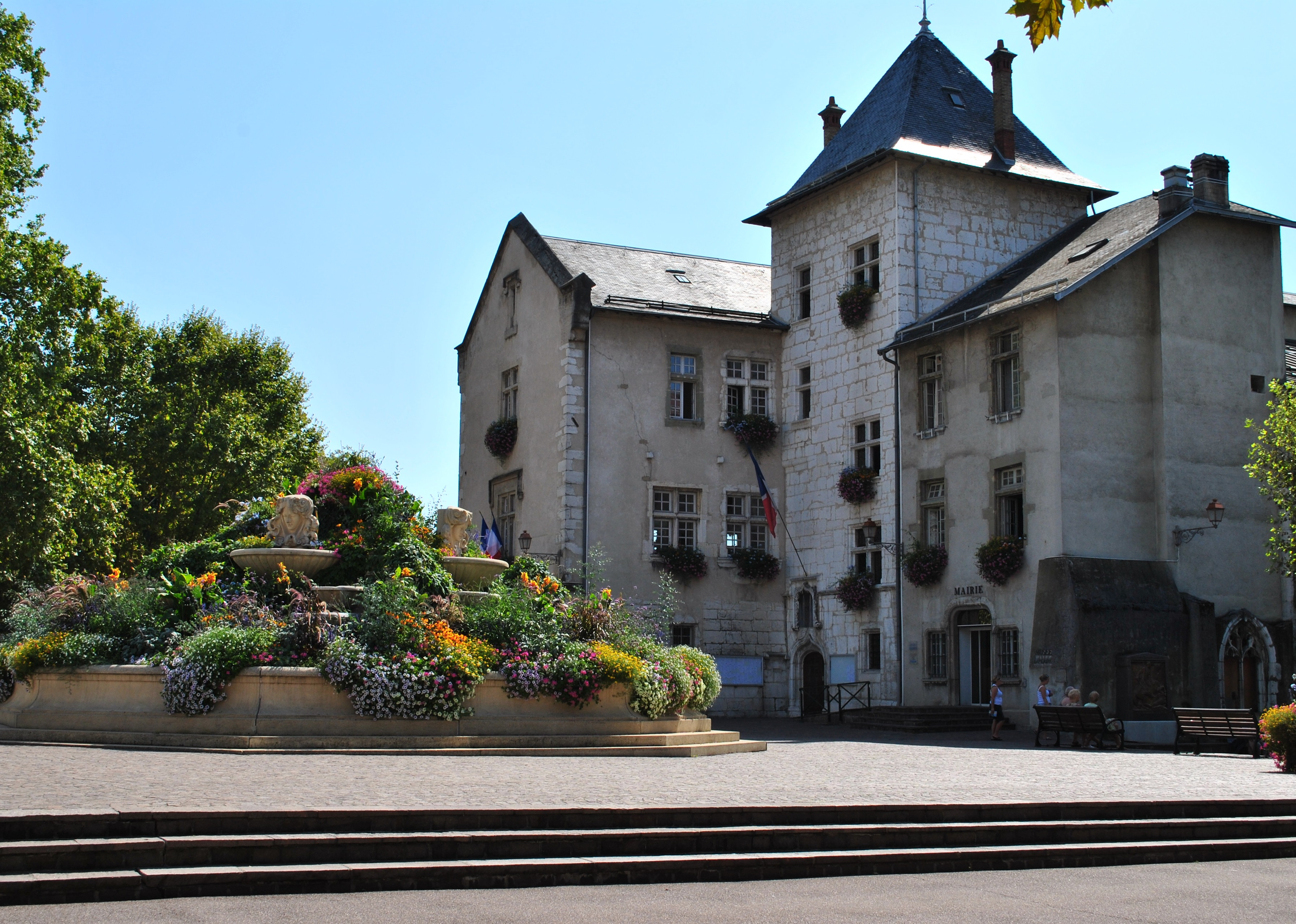
Aix-les-Bains in Savoie, which was awarded 4 flowers, also gained its second Golden Flower in 2017.

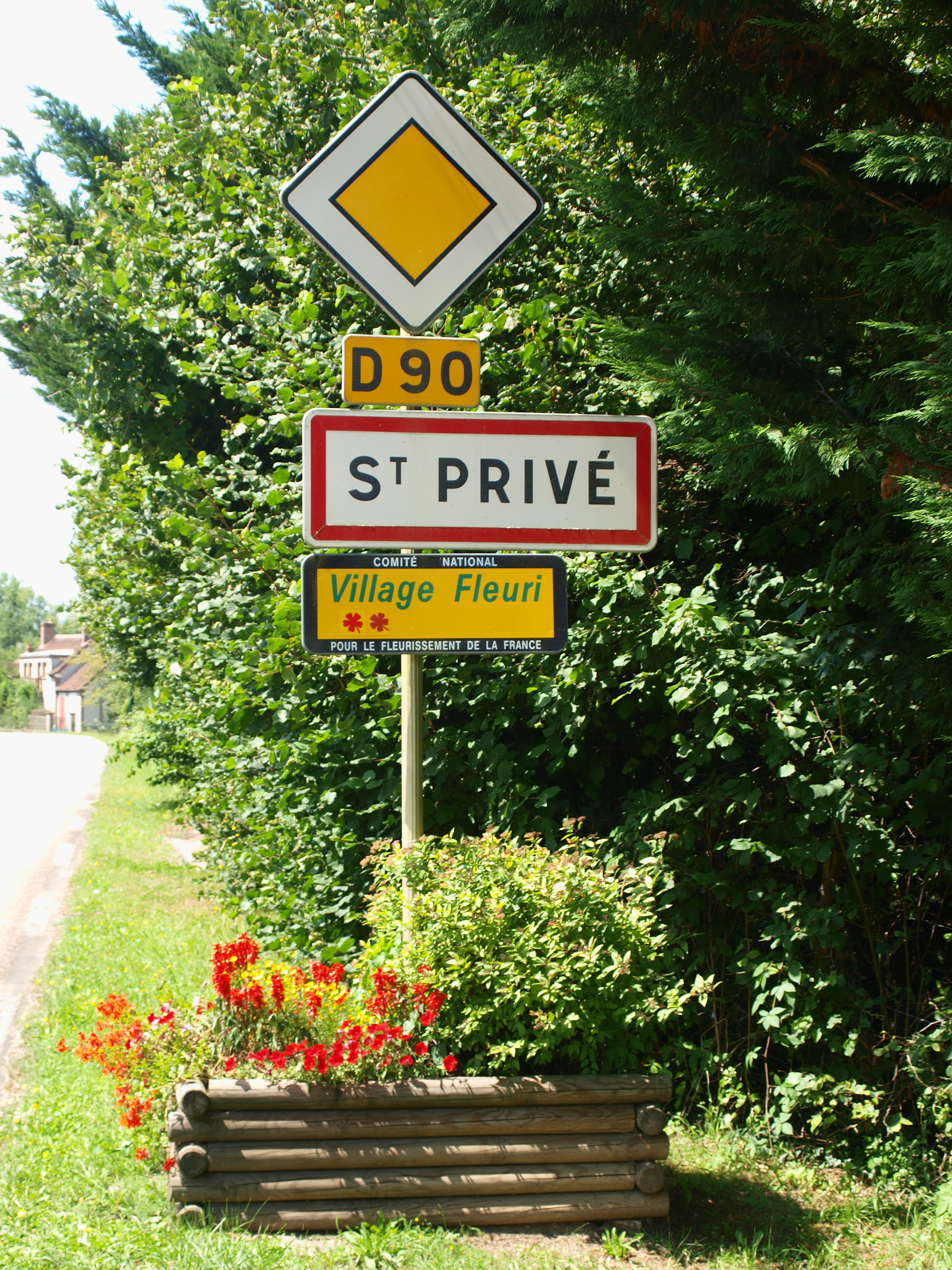
Road sign in Saint-Privé, Yonne (2 flowers)

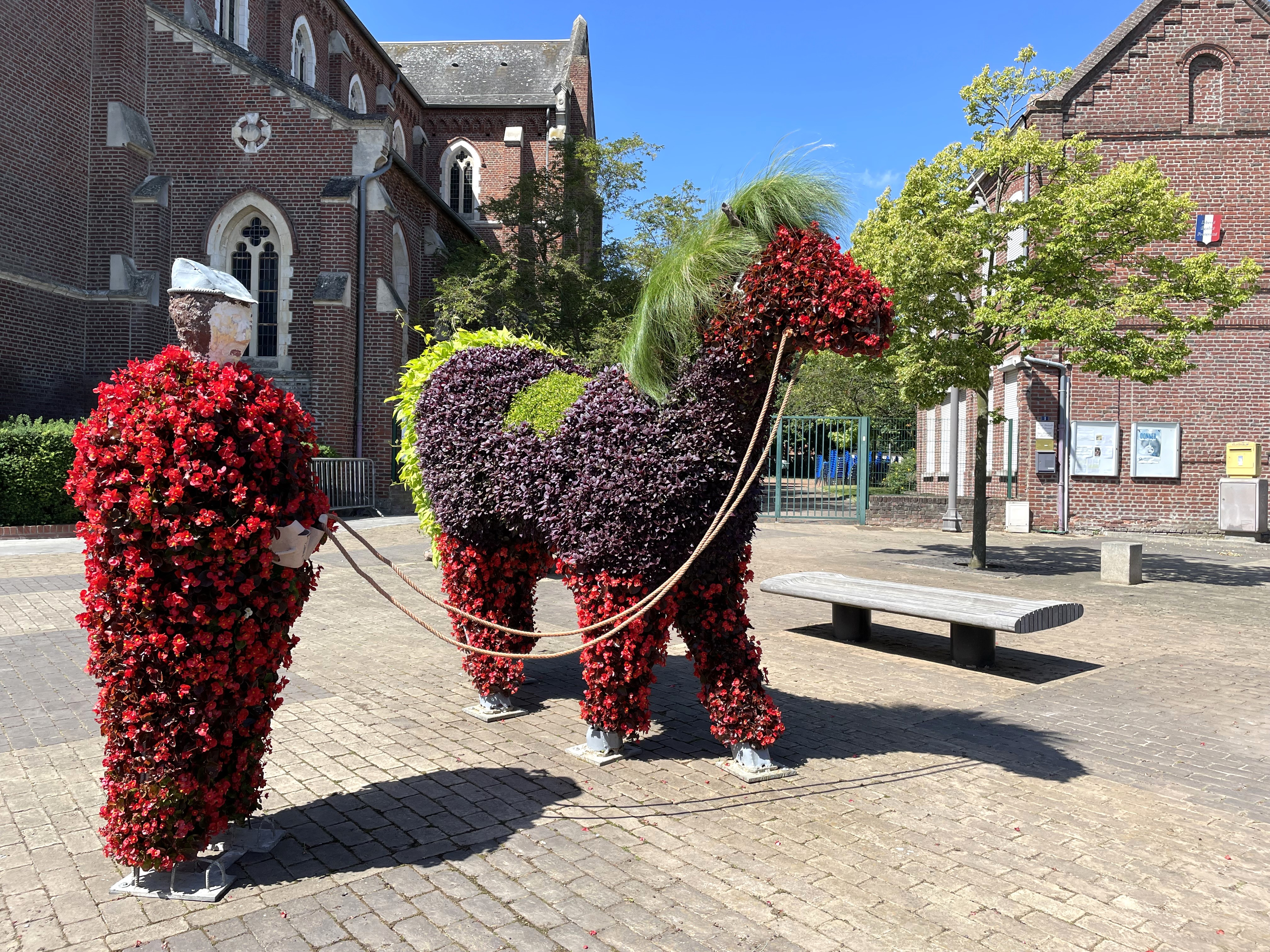
Flowered structures in front of Notre Dame church in Libercourt (3 flowers).

The Concours des villes et villages fleuris (French pronunciation: [kɔ̃kuʁ de vil e vilaʒ flœʁi], 'Competition of cities and villages in bloom') is an annual contest in France. It aims to encourage communes to adopt and implement policies improving the quality of life of their inhabitants and enhancing their attractiveness to visitors through the provision and maintenance of green spaces and the enhancement of their natural environments. Successful communes are awarded the right to display a badge (one to four flowers) on road signs and in other local promotional material.

The competition was created in 1959 by the French government and it is administered by a distinct national committee since 1972. This committee is still linked to the Ministry of Tourism. All French communes can take part and there are no application fees. There is not any limitation to the number of awarded communes, so they are not in competition between each other.

The label comprises four awards: one, two, three or four flowers, according to the efforts of the municipality. Each award is given according to strict criteria. The Fleur d'Or (Golden Flower) is a special prize awarded to a small number of applicants. Awarded communes display their flowers on road signs at their entrances. There are 4,931 awarded cities, towns and villages (2018). 257 of them have four flowers.

== History ==
The Concours des villes et villages fleuris originates from the various horticultural contests that appeared at the beginning of the 20th century. As tourism was growing, competitions were created for train stations and hotels to improve their visual quality. The Touring Club de France created the first competition dedicated to villages during the 1920s. Called Concours des villages coquets ('cosy villages contest'), it existed until 1939. After the Second World War, the Touring Club created an itinerary of flower-decked roads (routes fleuries) together with the Horticultural Association and the magazine Rustica. The success of the itinerary led to the creation of the present Concours des villes et villages fleuris in 1959. The competition passed from the French state to a national committee in 1972. Since 1988, its organisation has been the responsibility of the general councils which are the elected assemblies of the departments. The national committee remains the coordinator on a national level.

== Principles ==
At the beginning, the competition was about the aesthetics of green spaces and floral displays. Nowadays, it focuses more on general planning and how it improves the lives of local residents and the experience of visitors.

Communes that apply for the label are first selected by their department which sends the application to the regional council. The latter attributes the lowest awards (1, 2 and 3 flowers). The best applications are then submitted to the national committee which can attribute the 4 flowers and extra awards. Boards of examiners are formed on departmental, regional and national levels. Their members are usually municipal councilors, municipal clerks, horticulturists, gardeners, landscape architects, tourist office officials and representatives of various associations.

== Criteria ==
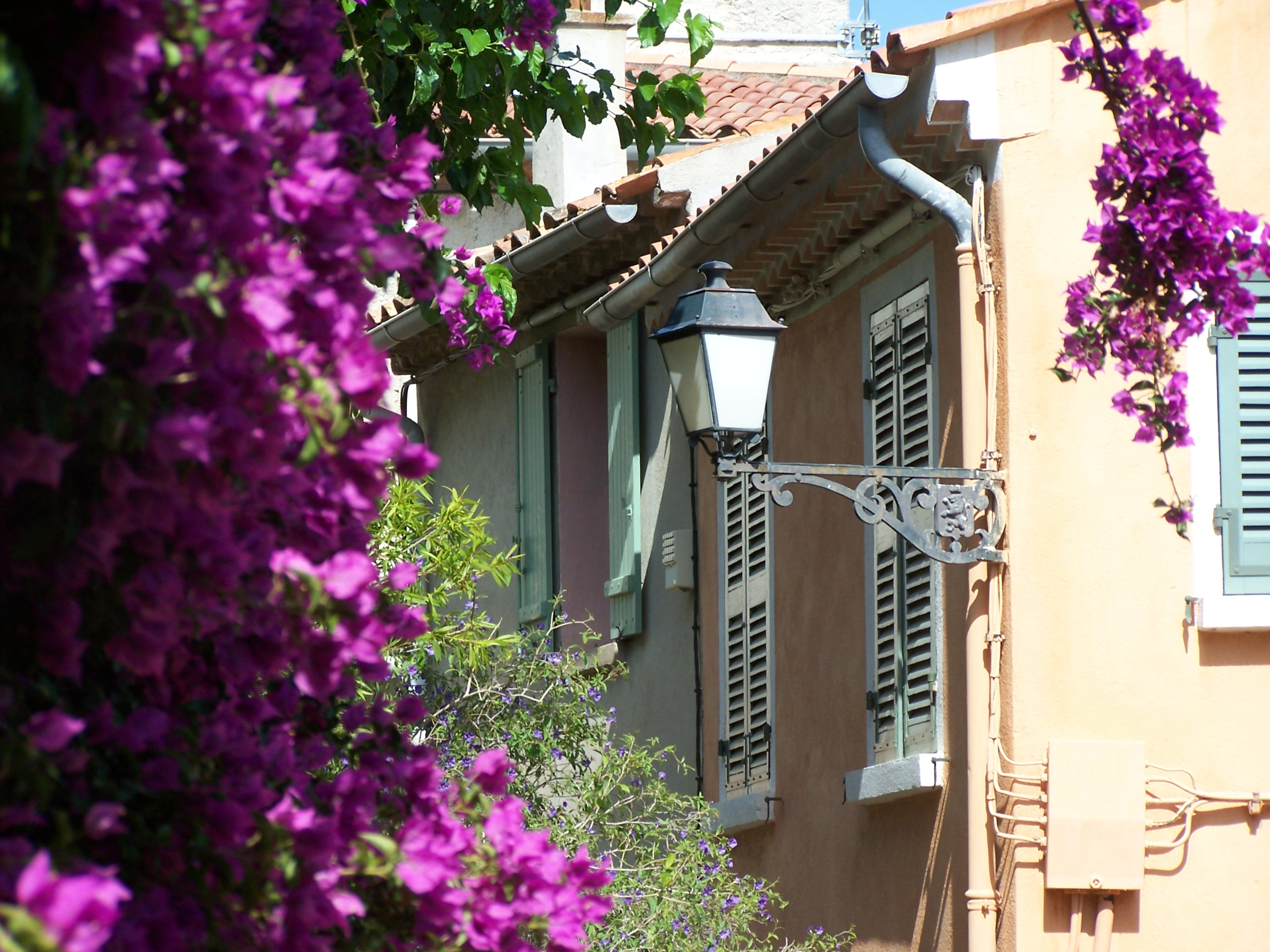
Bormes-les-Mimosas, Var (4 flowers)

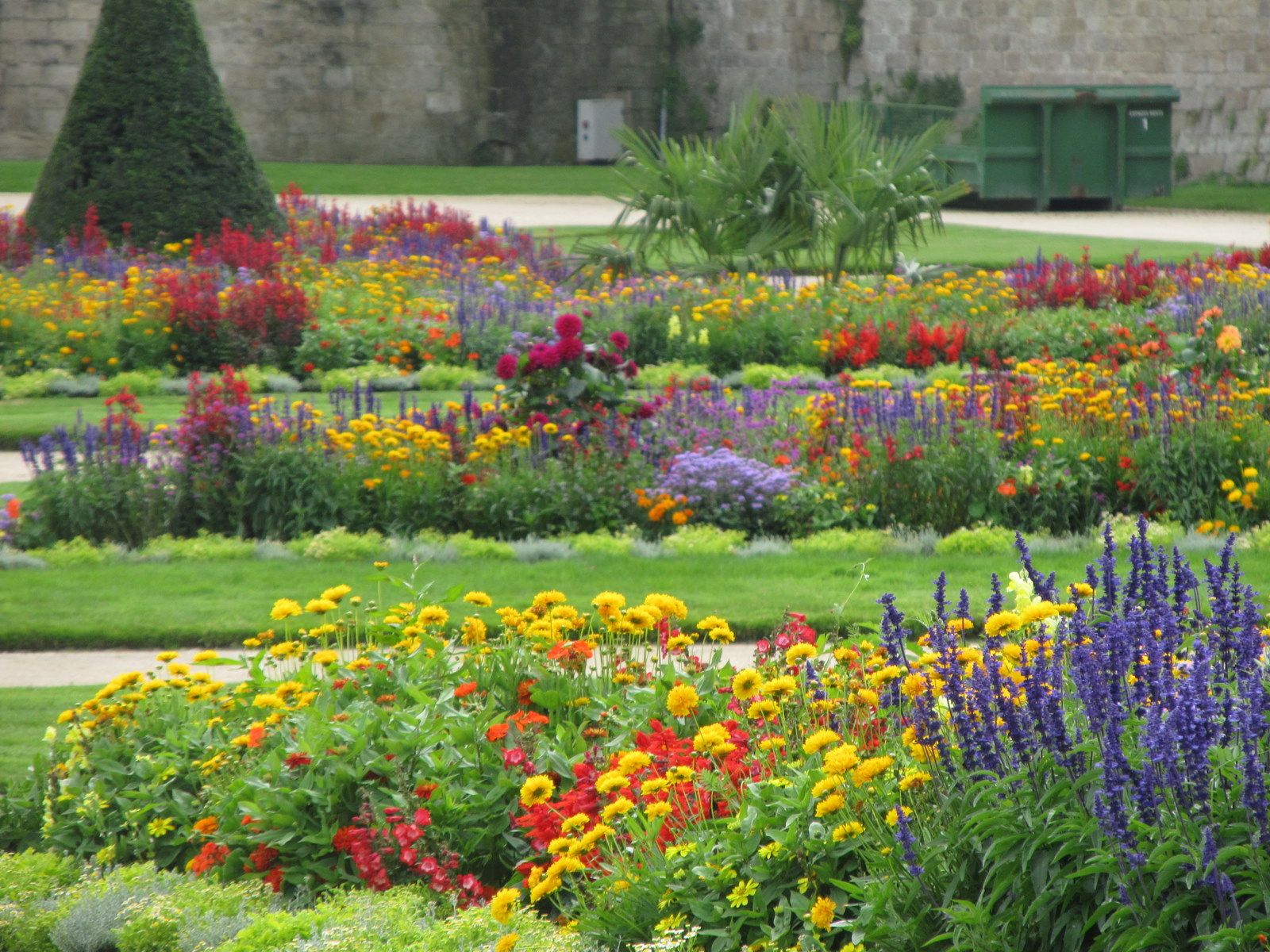
Garden in Vannes, Morbihan (4 flowers)

The Concours des villes et villages fleuris awards its labels according to strict criteria. This helps examiners evaluate the motivation of the local authorities, the development they expect through plants and green spaces, how they communicate it to the public, how they respect the environment, and so forth.

The evaluation grid used by examiners has categories in which a commune is rated with inexistant ('non-existent'), initié ('initiated', 'begun'), realisé ('achieved'), or conforté ('reinforced', 'strengthened'). The rating in each category results in a level between zero and four flowers. For instance, a category might ask if the locality displays flowers and plants all year round; if it is rated as having begun to do so, it receives one or two flowers, if rated as having done it, two or three, and if rated as having done it very well or strongly, four flowers. The average of all the answers given by the examiners determine which label the commune is awarded.

The criteria have evolved to further consider environmental aspects. These include biodiversity and cultural practices that are respectful to the environment, as well as the sustainability of blossoming. The latest rules include explicit criteria regarding that subject and the candidates can eventually claim Eco certifications (usage of FSC wood, certification of management of ecological green spaces, usage of biological products and alternatives to pesticides, etc.) The label accompanies a return to spaces which are more native and natural in patterned flower gardens and green spaces, and a preference for the planting of perennials over annual flowers.

These general criteria, set out in the updated rules, now reflect a broader and more environmentally conscious approach:

- The commune’s motivation to be rated level 1 to 4 flowers.
- The procedure to valorize the whole commune through vegetation and flowering.
- The actions of the commune to increase tourist inflow (valorization of the obtained level) and the improvement of this initiative from the entire population.
- The presentation of the vegetation and flowering
- Ways to manage the maintenance of the heritage by respecting the biodiversity and natural resources (water)
- Other actions to embellish the commune: the maintenance of the roadway, the facades, the addition of street furniture (benches, etc.) but also the general cleanliness of the areas.
- The harmony of the landscape arrangements and their management over the commune.

== International competition ==
The Concours des villes et villages fleuris has initiated a European competition called Entente Florale Europe ("Europe Floral Harmony"). It started in 1975 between Great Britain and France and has since expanded to include all members of the European Union and the EFTA. As of 2015, Austria, Belgium, Croatia, the Czech Republic, Germany, Hungary, the Republic of Ireland, Italy, the Netherlands, Slovenia and the United Kingdom are full members of the Entente. During this annual competition, each country submits a candidate locality. The best one is awarded a prize.

== See also ==
- Britain in Bloom
- Tourism in France
- French towns and lands of Art and History
- Les Plus Beaux Villages de France
