= Bléneau =

- Commune
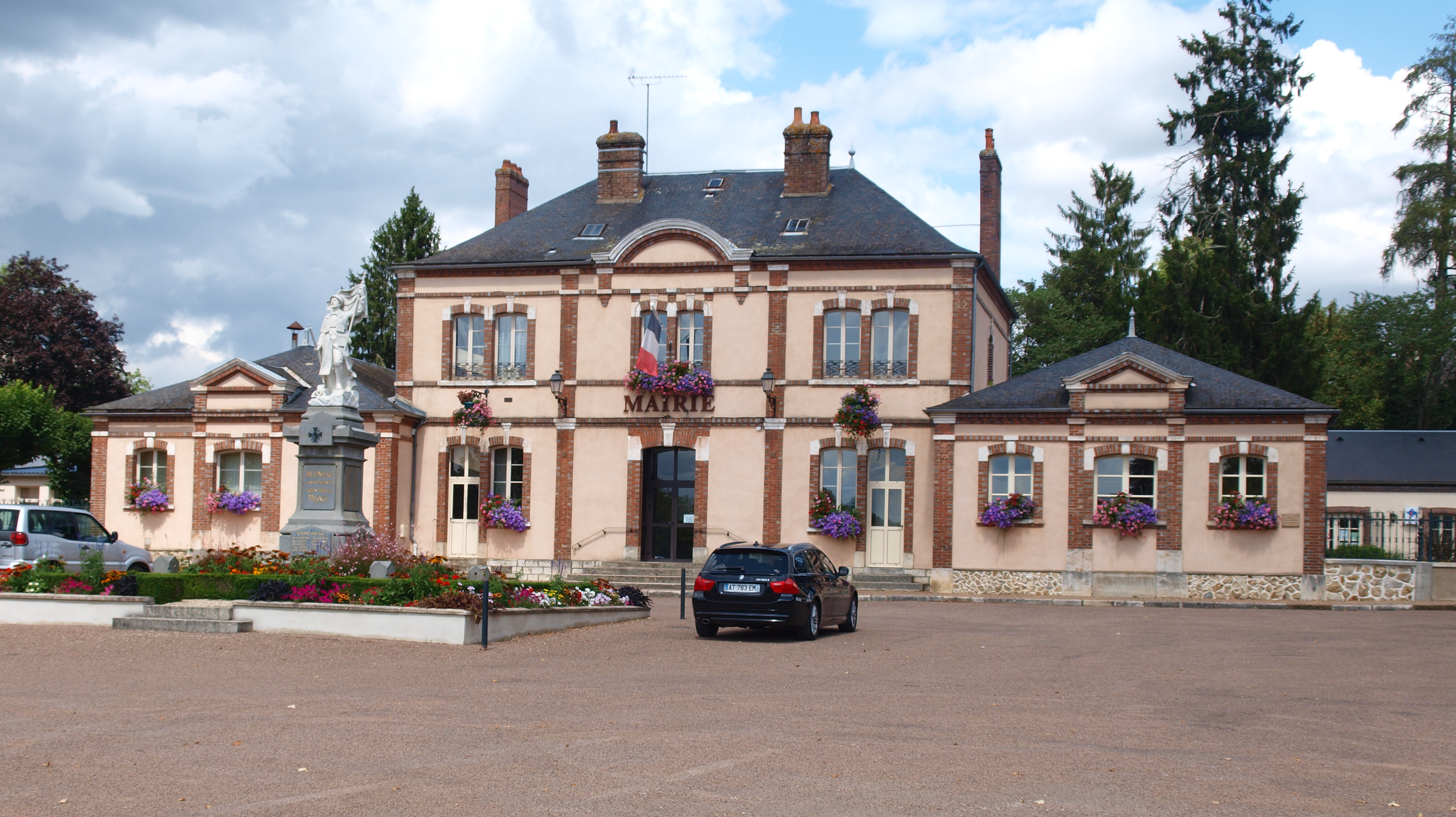
- The town hall in Bléneau

- Coat of arms
- Location of Bléneau
- Location within France Location within Bourgogne-Franche-Comté
- Coordinates: 47°42′08″N 2°56′59″E
- Country: France
- Region: Bourgogne-Franche-Comté
- Department: Yonne
- Arrondissement: Auxerre
- Canton: Cœur de Puisaye

Government
  - Mayor (2020–2026): Alain Drouhin
- Area^{1}: 39.41 km^{2} (15.22 sq mi)
- Highest elevation: 209 m (686 ft)
- Lowest elevation: 145 m (476 ft)
- Population (2023): 1,153
  - Density: 29.26/km^{2} (75.77/sq mi)
- Time zone: UTC+01:00 (CET)
  - Summer (DST): UTC+02:00 (CEST)
- INSEE/Postal code: 89046 /89220
- ^{1} French Land Register data, which excludes lakes, ponds, glaciers > 1 km^{2} (0.386 sq mi or 247 acres) and river estuaries.

Bléneau (French pronunciation: [bleno]) is a commune in the Yonne department in Bourgogne-Franche-Comté in north-central France, in the historical region of Puisaye.

== Geography ==
Bléneau, the administrative centre of its natural area, is a commune of 1,153 inhabitants (in 2023) of the Puisaye area. The commune is on the site of an ancient route that crossed the Loing. The commune covers 3941 hectares and has forests, ponds and grazing lands on its territory. Bléneau is situated at 150 km from Paris, 56 km from Auxerre and 29 km from Gien.

Like the rest of Yonne, Bléneau is on the geological region of the Paris Bassin, but the natural area of Puisaye is characterized by the presence of Puisaye sand and the presence of groundwater that permeate the soil. Bléneau thus presents many wetland habitats and meadows on its territory.

There is a Natural site of importance (Natura 2000) on the territory of the commune, at the limit of the neighbouring commune of Saint-Privé. That natural site is composed of oligotrophic ponds where littorella plants grow and their adjacent damp meadows. The protected site presents a complexe ensemble of green landscapes, damp or dry, in every stage of plant colonisation.

== History ==
Humane presence on the territory is present since Palaeolithic, and many silex tools were found, notably by André Huchet on a site near the limit of Bléneau and Saint-Privé. More than 2000 silex tools were collected on a territory of less than 25 hectares.

Tombs from the Gallo-Roman period were found in 1832 near the heart of the commune. Approximatively twenty tombs dug directly in coral-rag were discovered, inside which were human remains and a few metallic objects, amon others were a copper ring, an iron belt plate and an iron hook. All the individuals buried had their head pointing toward the east. Other tombs of the same period were found in the area. The presence of these tombstone indicate the presence of a roman upper class in the city.

The commune is first mentioned in the 6th century in an official text called "Statuts de Saint-Aunaire évèque d'Auxerre de 572 à 603" which listed the 38 parishes of Puisaye. The commune was listed under the name Blanoilus and is considered an important community of the area. The origin of the name Bléneau is unclear, and there are hypothesis of a gaulish or Celtic origin.

The city was on an ancient road called Voie des marchands, meaning "merchants' road", which connected Auxerre to Briare by crossing the Loing. Archeological researches in the area showed that there were notable Gallo-Roman settlements in the area, and sarcophagus and traces of iron mining were found near the commune.

The first feudal lords of the area are unknown, and the first known house governing Bléneau was the Saint-Verrain House that acquired it in 1286, and the fief got into the hands of the Courtenay House in 1328. The castellany stayed under their control until 1773, when they sold it to pay their debt.

The name of the commune if linked to the "battle of Bléneau" of 1652.

== Sightseeing ==
=== Les jardins d'eau ===
The Jardins d'eau de Pierre Doudeau were created in 1994 and are now the property of the commune. Botanical garden combining water and green landscapes, the Jardin d'eau extends on 4 hectares and contains more than 800 plant species, many of them rare or endemic. Many waterfowls live in the park: ducks, swans, red-crested pochards, moorhens, etc. The island on the biggest pond of the parc has more than 5000 bulbs of daffodils. Every year during summer, a familial celebration is held in the garden.

== See also ==
- Communes of the Yonne department
