= Saint-Hilaire-sur-Puiseaux =

- Commune
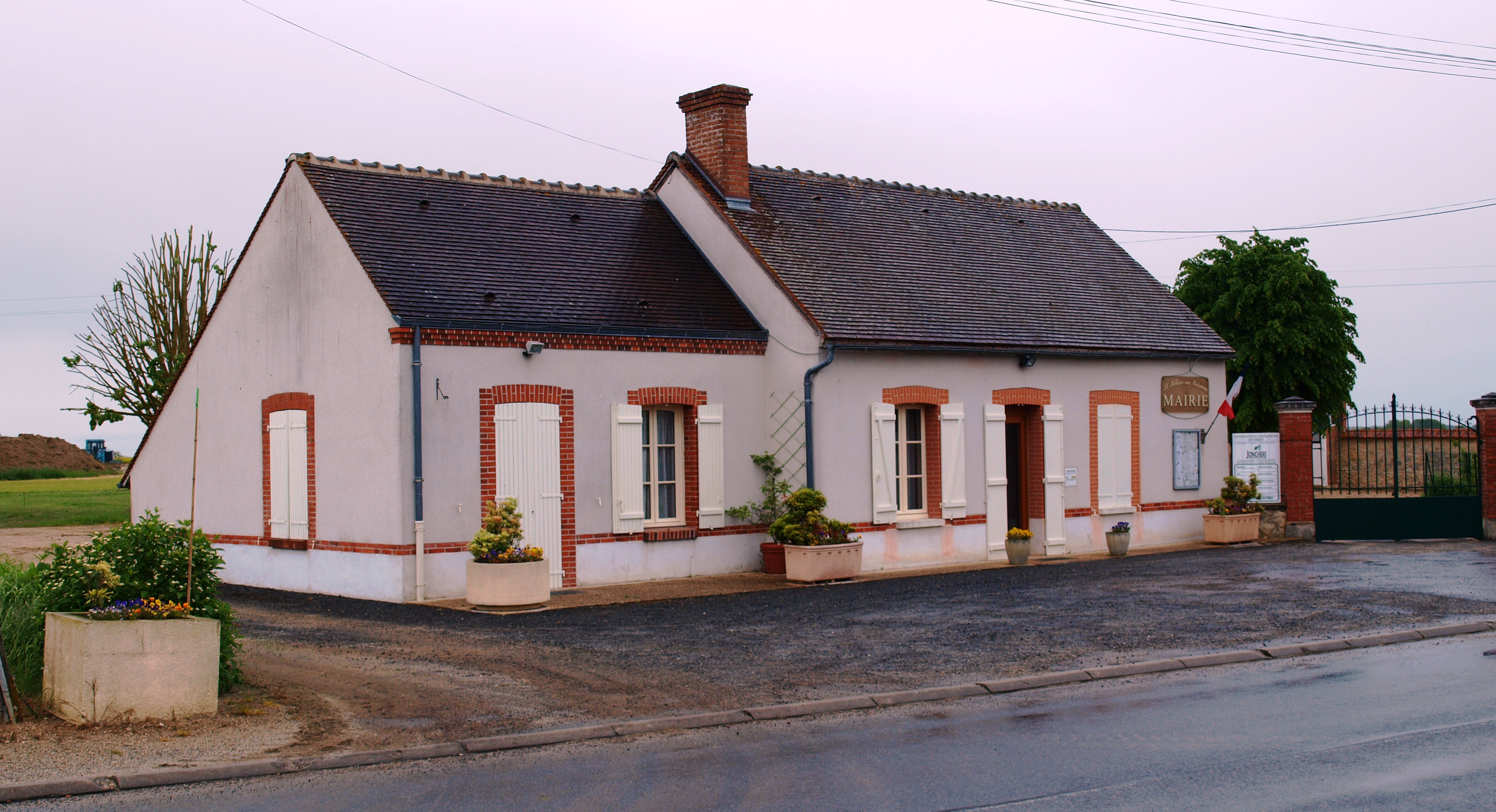
- The town hall in Saint-Hilaire-sur-Puiseaux
- Location of Saint-Hilaire-sur-Puiseaux
- Location within France Location within Centre-Val de Loire
- Coordinates: 47°54′05″N 2°42′20″E
- Country: France
- Region: Centre-Val de Loire
- Department: Loiret
- Arrondissement: Montargis
- Canton: Lorris
- Intercommunality: Canaux et Forêts en Gâtinais

Government
  - Mayor (2020–2026): Patrice Vieugué
- Area^{1}: 11.34 km^{2} (4.38 sq mi)
- Highest elevation: 110 m (360 ft)
- Lowest elevation: 96 m (315 ft)
- Population (2023): 151
  - Density: 13.3/km^{2} (34.5/sq mi)
- Time zone: UTC+01:00 (CET)
  - Summer (DST): UTC+02:00 (CEST)
- INSEE/Postal code: 45283 /45700
- ^{1} French Land Register data, which excludes lakes, ponds, glaciers > 1 km^{2} (0.386 sq mi or 247 acres) and river estuaries.

Saint-Hilaire-sur-Puiseaux (French pronunciation: [sɛ̃.t‿ilɛʁ syʁ pɥizo], literally Saint-Hilaire on Puiseaux) is a commune in the Loiret department in north-central France.

It is located about 60 km east of Orléans, on the Puiseaux river. Its neighbouring communes include Ouzouer-des-Champs, Solterre, Oussoy-en-Gâtinais, Varennes-Changy and Montcresson.

The village has a small chateau, on a square plan with corner turrets.

== See also ==
- Communes of the Loiret department
