= Loing =

River in France

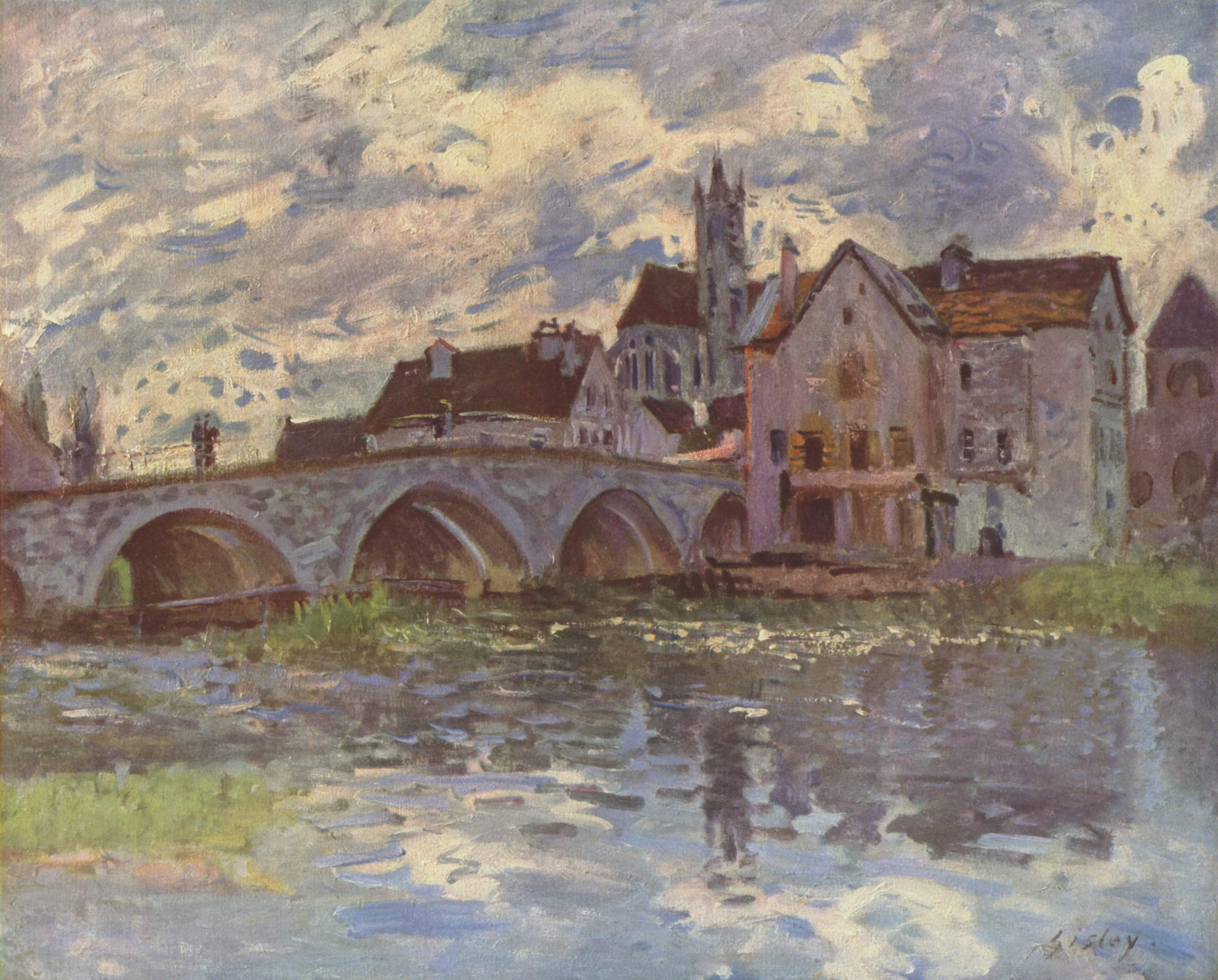
- Loing River; painted by Alfred Sisley

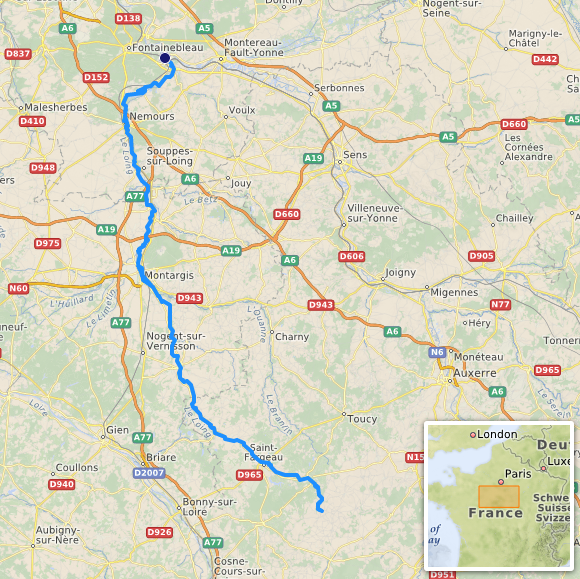

Location
- Country: France

Physical characteristics
- Source
  - location: Burgundy
  - coordinates: 47°33′13″N 3°13′51″E
  - elevation: 320 m (1,050 ft)
- Mouth
  - location: Seine
  - coordinates: 48°23′13″N 2°48′9″E
  - elevation: 45 m (148 ft)
- Length: 143 km (89 mi)
- Basin size: 4,150 km^{2} (1,600 mi^{2})
- Discharge
  - average: 19 m^{3}/s (670 cu ft/s)

Basin features
- Progression: Seine→ English Channel

The Loing (French pronunciation: [lwɛ̃]) is a 143 km (89 mi) long river in central France, a left tributary of the Seine.

Its source is in Sainte-Colombe-sur-Loing, in the southwest of the department of Yonne, and it flows into the Seine in Saint-Mammès, near Moret-sur-Loing. Its main tributaries are the Ouanne, the Aveyron, the Puiseaux, the Solin, the Lunain and the Orvanne. The part of the Briare Canal between Rogny-les-Sept-Écluses and Montargis runs parallel to the Loing.

== Departments and communes along river course ==
- Yonne: Sainte-Colombe-sur-Loing, Saint-Sauveur-en-Puisaye, Moutiers-en-Puisaye, Saint-Fargeau, Saint-Martin-des-Champs, Saint-Privé, Bléneau, Rogny-les-Sept-Écluses
- Loiret: Dammarie-sur-Loing, Sainte-Geneviève-des-Bois, Châtillon-Coligny, Montbouy, Montcresson, Conflans-sur-Loing, Amilly, Montargis, Châlette-sur-Loing, Cepoy, Girolles, Fontenay-sur-Loing, Nargis, Dordives
- Seine-et-Marne: Château-Landon, Souppes-sur-Loing, La Madeleine-sur-Loing, Poligny, Bagneaux-sur-Loing, Saint-Pierre-lès-Nemours, Nemours, Moncourt-Fromonville, Grez-sur-Loing, Bourron-Marlotte, Montigny-sur-Loing, La Genevraye, Épisy, Écuelles, Moret-sur-Loing, Saint-Mammès, Veneux-les-Sablons

== Tributaries ==
- Left tributaries: Solin, Puiseaux, Beaune
- Right tributaries: Orvanne, Lunain, Ouanne, Aveyron
