= Lavau =

Lavau is the name or part of the name of the following communes in France:

- Lavau, Aube, in the Aube department
- Lavau, Yonne, in the Yonne department
- Lavau-sur-Loire, in the Loire-Atlantique department
