= Diges =

- Commune
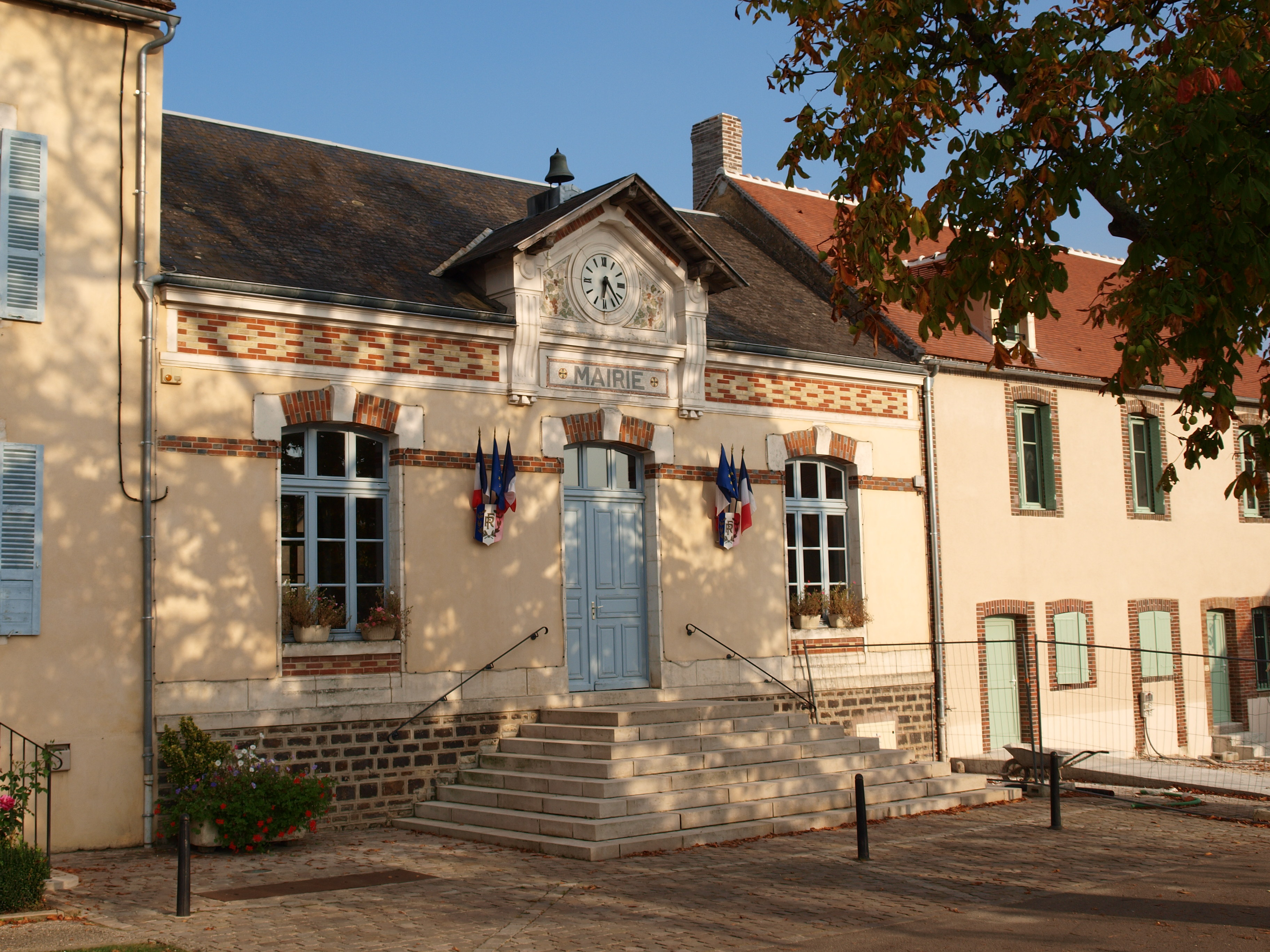
- The town hall in Diges
- Location of Diges
- Location within France Location within Bourgogne-Franche-Comté
- Coordinates: 47°43′49″N 3°23′55″E
- Country: France
- Region: Bourgogne-Franche-Comté
- Department: Yonne
- Arrondissement: Auxerre
- Canton: Cœur de Puisaye

Government
  - Mayor (2020–2026): Jean-Luc Vandaele
- Area^{1}: 35.84 km^{2} (13.84 sq mi)
- Highest elevation: 326 m (1,070 ft)
- Lowest elevation: 151 m (495 ft)
- Population (2023): 1,052
  - Density: 29.35/km^{2} (76.02/sq mi)
- Time zone: UTC+01:00 (CET)
  - Summer (DST): UTC+02:00 (CEST)
- INSEE/Postal code: 89139 /89240
- ^{1} French Land Register data, which excludes lakes, ponds, glaciers > 1 km^{2} (0.386 sq mi or 247 acres) and river estuaries.

Diges (French pronunciation: [diʒ]) is a Commune in the Yonne department in Bourgogne-Franche-Comté in north-central France.

== See also ==
- Communes of the Yonne department
