= Pourrain =

- Commune
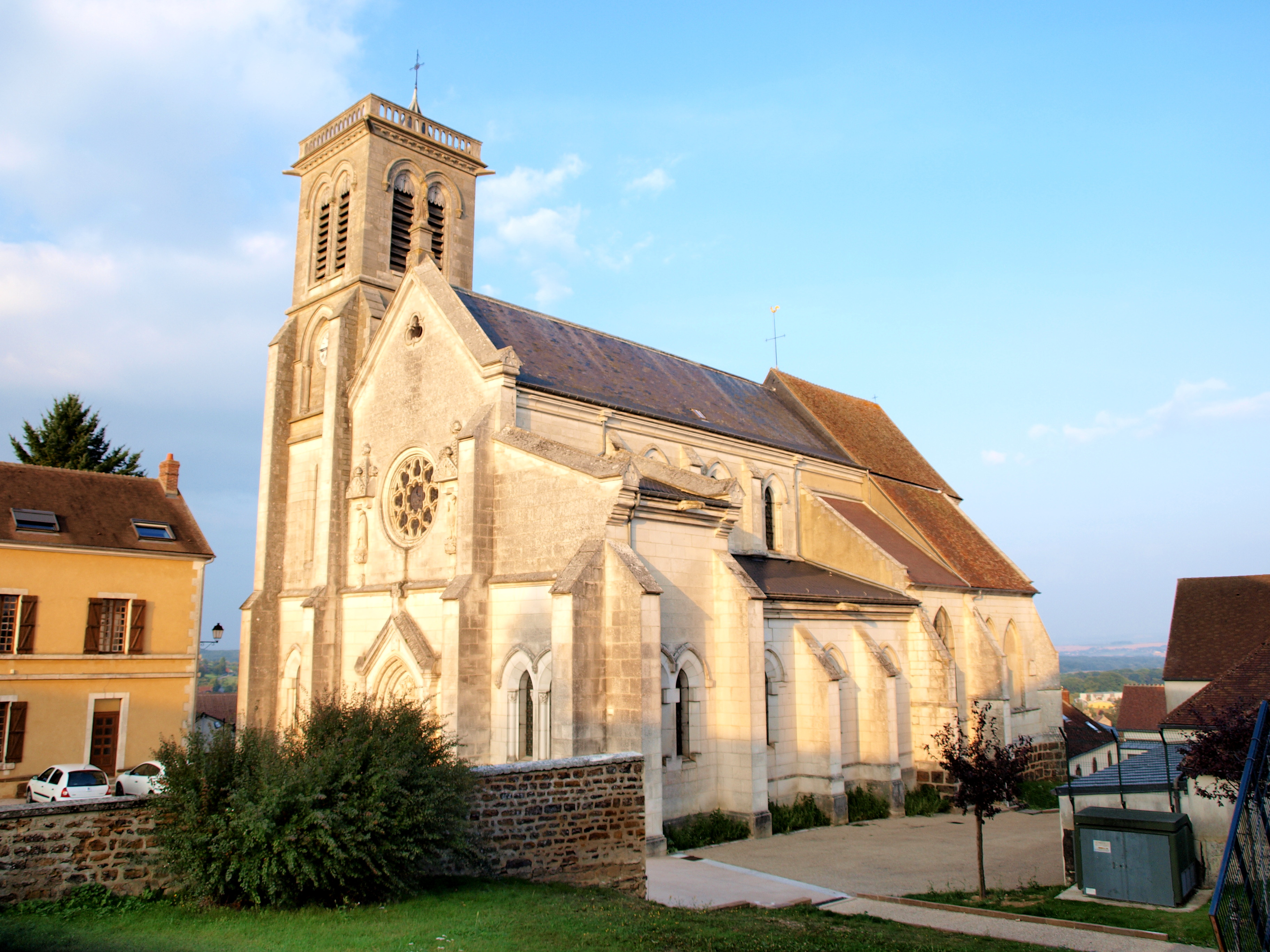
- The church in Pourrain
- Location of Pourrain
- Location within France Location within Bourgogne-Franche-Comté
- Coordinates: 47°45′21″N 3°24′47″E
- Country: France
- Region: Bourgogne-Franche-Comté
- Department: Yonne
- Arrondissement: Auxerre
- Canton: Cœur de Puisaye

Government
  - Mayor (2020–2026): Roger Prignot
- Area^{1}: 23.84 km^{2} (9.20 sq mi)
- Highest elevation: 292 m (958 ft)
- Lowest elevation: 148 m (486 ft)
- Population (2023): 1,270
  - Density: 53.3/km^{2} (138/sq mi)
- Time zone: UTC+01:00 (CET)
  - Summer (DST): UTC+02:00 (CEST)
- INSEE/Postal code: 89311 /89240
- ^{1} French Land Register data, which excludes lakes, ponds, glaciers > 1 km^{2} (0.386 sq mi or 247 acres) and river estuaries.

Pourrain (French pronunciation: [puʁɛ̃]) is a commune in the Yonne department in Bourgogne-Franche-Comté in north-central France.

== See also ==
- Communes of the Yonne department
