= Fontaines, Yonne =

Fontaines
- Commune
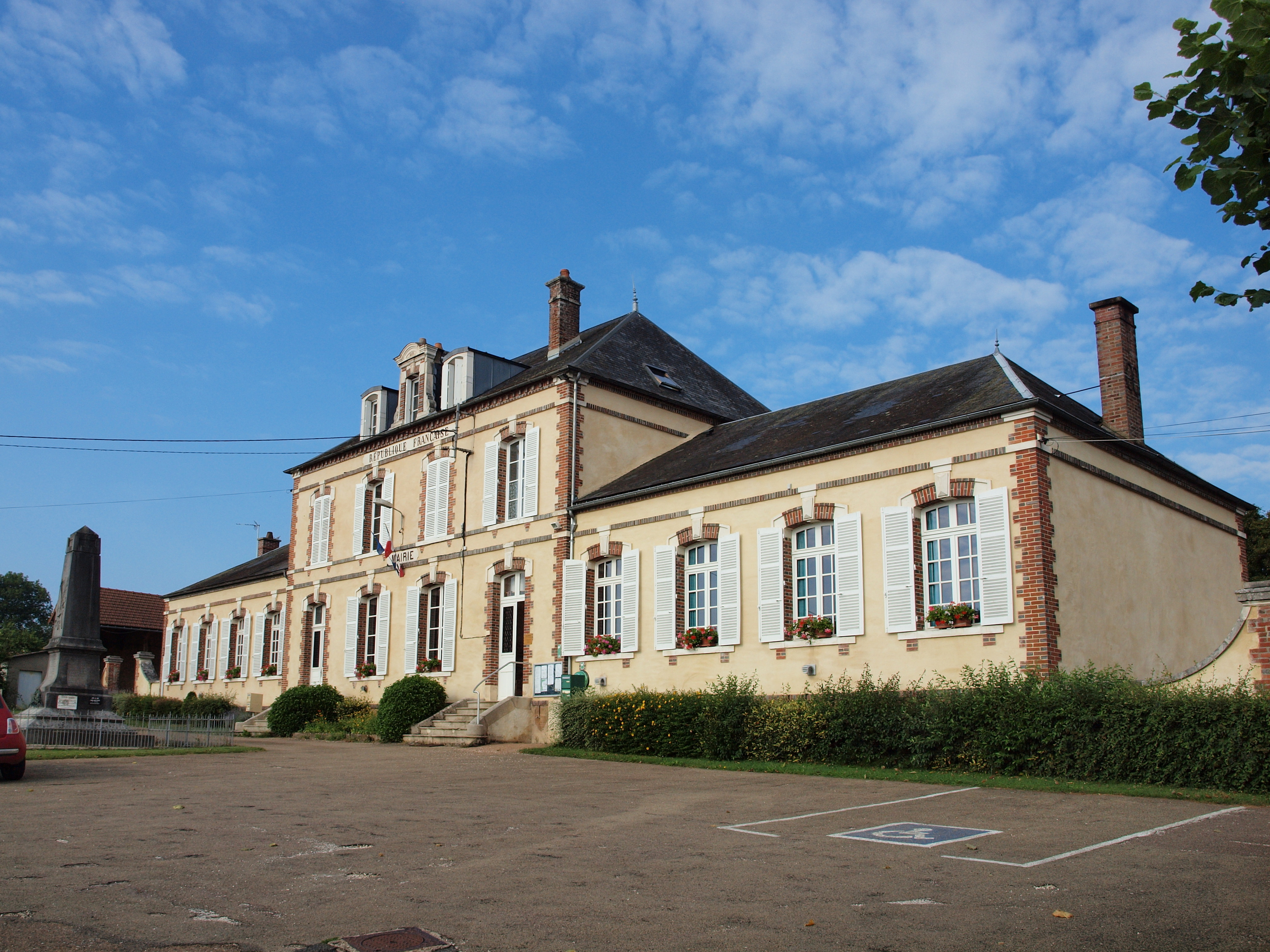
- The town hall in Fontaines
- Location of Fontaines
- Location within France Location within Bourgogne-Franche-Comté
- Coordinates: 47°41′35″N 3°15′37″E
- Country: France
- Region: Bourgogne-Franche-Comté
- Department: Yonne
- Arrondissement: Auxerre
- Canton: Cœur de Puisaye

Government
  - Mayor (2020–2026): Yves Fouquet
- Area^{1}: 25.18 km^{2} (9.72 sq mi)
- Highest elevation: 332 m (1,089 ft)
- Lowest elevation: 201 m (659 ft)
- Population (2023): 459
  - Density: 18.2/km^{2} (47.2/sq mi)
- Time zone: UTC+01:00 (CET)
  - Summer (DST): UTC+02:00 (CEST)
- INSEE/Postal code: 89173 /89130
- ^{1} French Land Register data, which excludes lakes, ponds, glaciers > 1 km^{2} (0.386 sq mi or 247 acres) and river estuaries.

Fontaines (French pronunciation: [fɔ̃tɛn]) is a commune in the Yonne department in Bourgogne-Franche-Comté in north-central France.

== See also ==
- Communes of the Yonne department
