= Orvanne (river) =

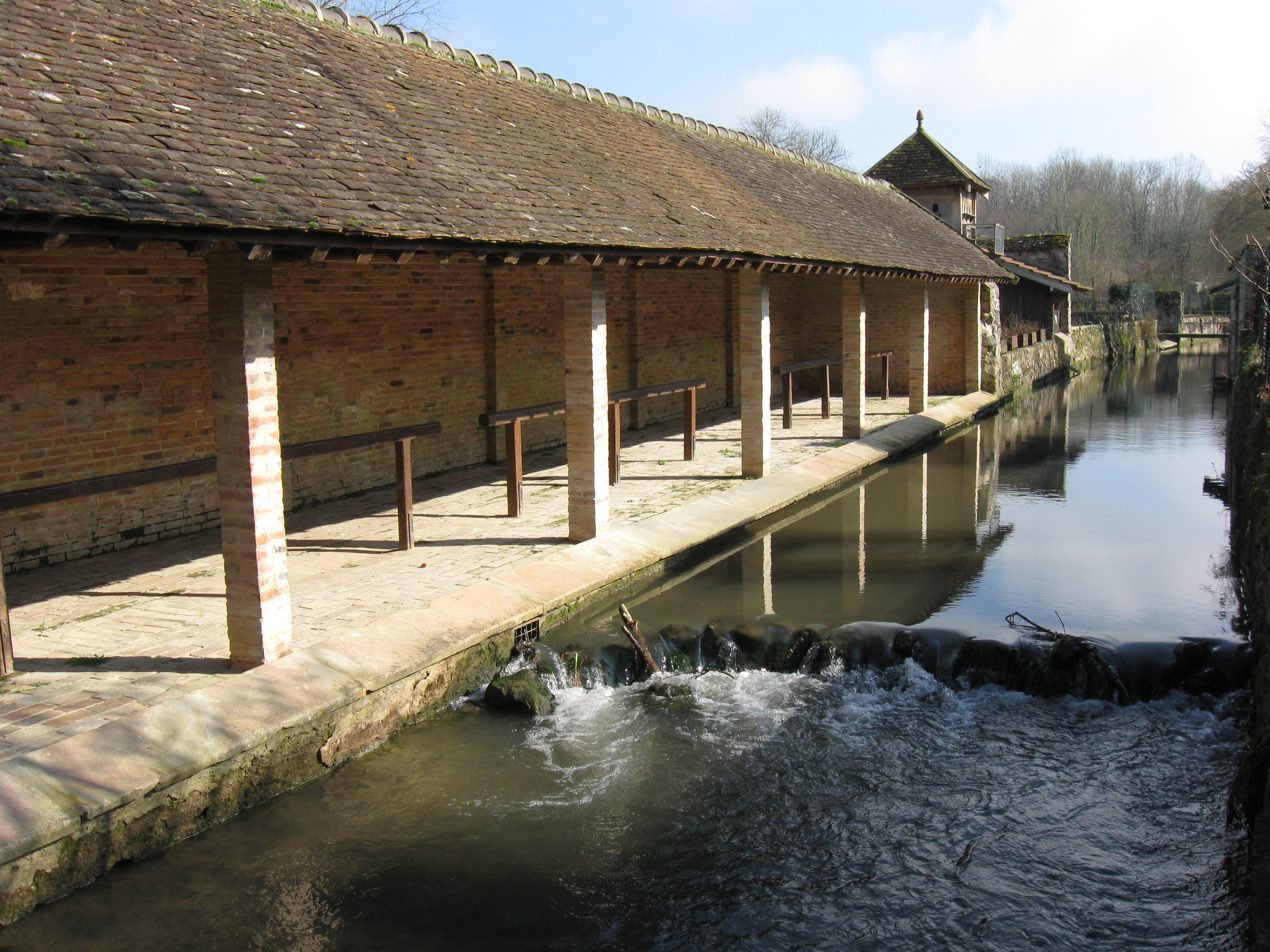
- The Orvanne in Flagy

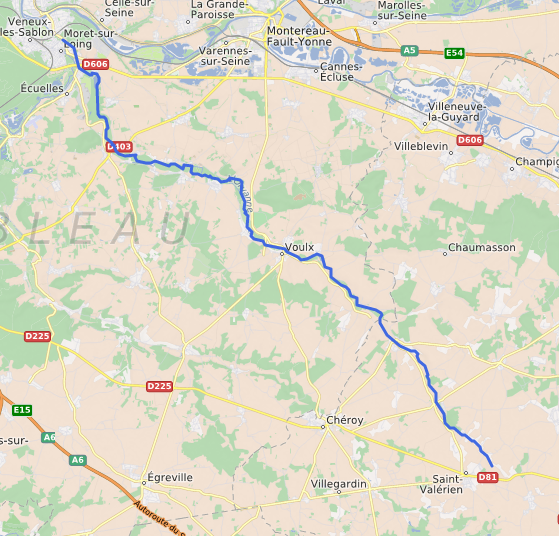

Location
- Country: France

Physical characteristics
- Mouth: Loing
  - coordinates: 48.3779°N 2.8182°E
- Length: 38.8 km (24.1 mi)

Basin features
- Progression: Loing→ Seine→ English Channel

The Orvanne (French pronunciation: [ɔʁvan]) is a 38.8 km (24.1 mi) long river in northern France located in the departments of Yonne (Bourgogne-Franche-Comté) and Seine-et-Marne (Île-de-France). It is a tributary of the river Loing on the right side, and so is a sub-tributary of the Seine. Its source is in the commune of Saint-Valérien, and it flows into the Loing in Moret-sur-Loing. The largest towns on the Orvanne are Voulx and Moret-Loing-et-Orvanne.
