= Canton of Cœur de Puisaye =

Coordinates: 47.74°N 3.29°E

The canton of Cœur de Puisaye is an administrative division of the Yonne department, central France. It was created at the French canton reorganisation which came into effect in March 2015. Its seat is in Toucy. It includes part of the historical region of Puisaye.

It consists of the following communes:

1. Beauvoir
2. Bléneau
3. Champcevrais
4. Champignelles
5. Diges
6. Dracy
7. Égleny
8. Fontaines
9. Lalande
10. Lavau
11. Leugny
12. Mézilles
13. Moulins-sur-Ouanne
14. Parly
15. Pourrain
16. Rogny-les-Sept-Écluses
17. Ronchères
18. Saint-Fargeau
19. Saint-Martin-des-Champs
20. Saint-Privé
21. Tannerre-en-Puisaye
22. Toucy
23. Villeneuve-les-Genêts
24. Villiers-Saint-Benoît
