= Villeneuve-les-Genêts =

- Commune
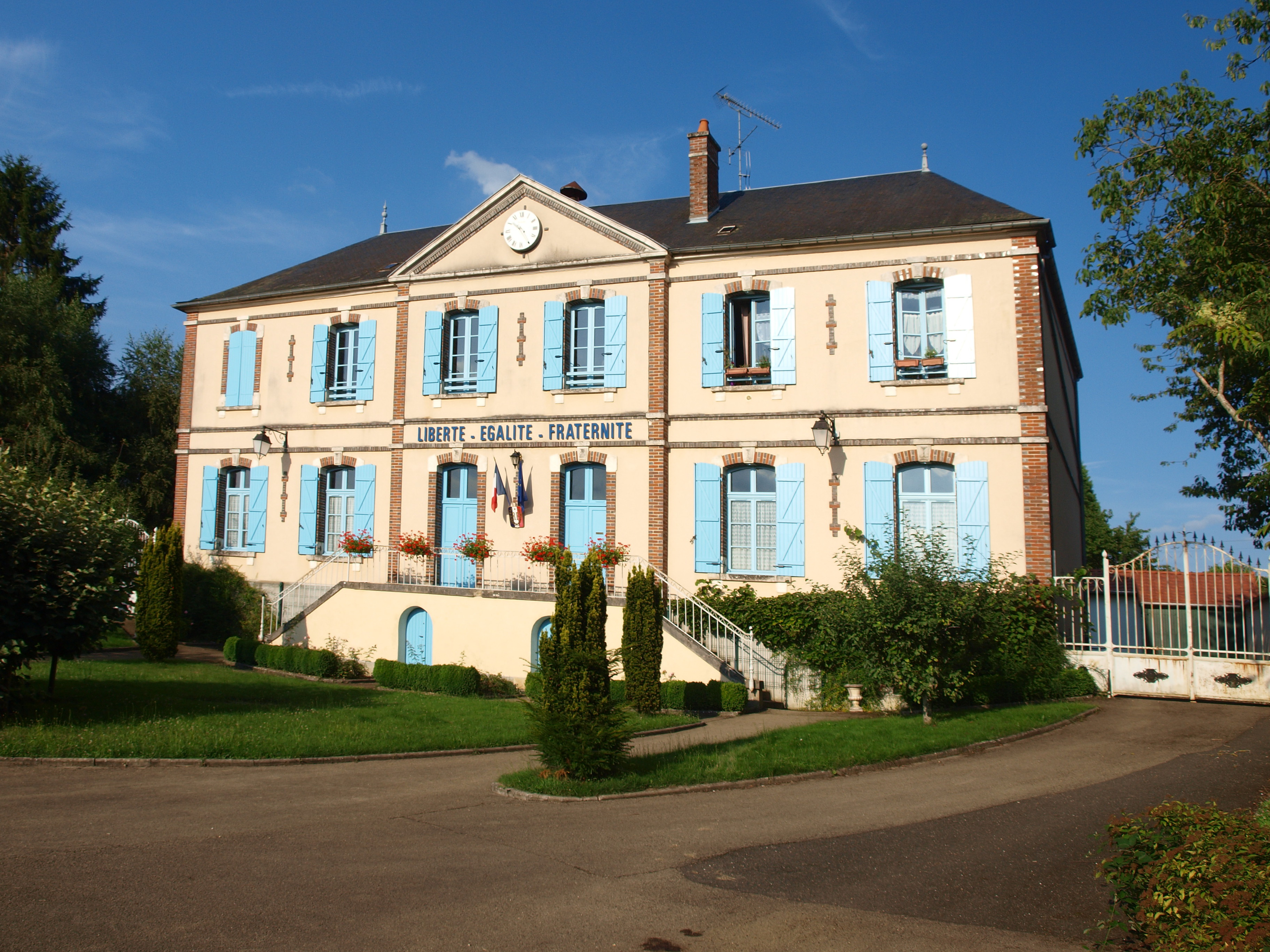
- The town hall in Villeneuve-les-Genêts
- Location of Villeneuve-les-Genêts
- Location within France Location within Bourgogne-Franche-Comté
- Coordinates: 47°44′15″N 3°05′32″E
- Country: France
- Region: Bourgogne-Franche-Comté
- Department: Yonne
- Arrondissement: Auxerre
- Canton: Cœur de Puisaye

Government
  - Mayor (2020–2026): Richard Jaskot
- Area^{1}: 24.69 km^{2} (9.53 sq mi)
- Highest elevation: 218 m (715 ft)
- Lowest elevation: 171 m (561 ft)
- Population (2023): 312
  - Density: 12.6/km^{2} (32.7/sq mi)
- Time zone: UTC+01:00 (CET)
  - Summer (DST): UTC+02:00 (CEST)
- INSEE/Postal code: 89462 /89350
- ^{1} French Land Register data, which excludes lakes, ponds, glaciers > 1 km^{2} (0.386 sq mi or 247 acres) and river estuaries.

Villeneuve-les-Genêts (French pronunciation: [vilnœv le ʒənɛ]) is a commune in the Yonne department in Bourgogne-Franche-Comté in north-central France.

== See also ==
- Communes of the Yonne department
