= Lalande, Yonne =

Lalande
- Commune
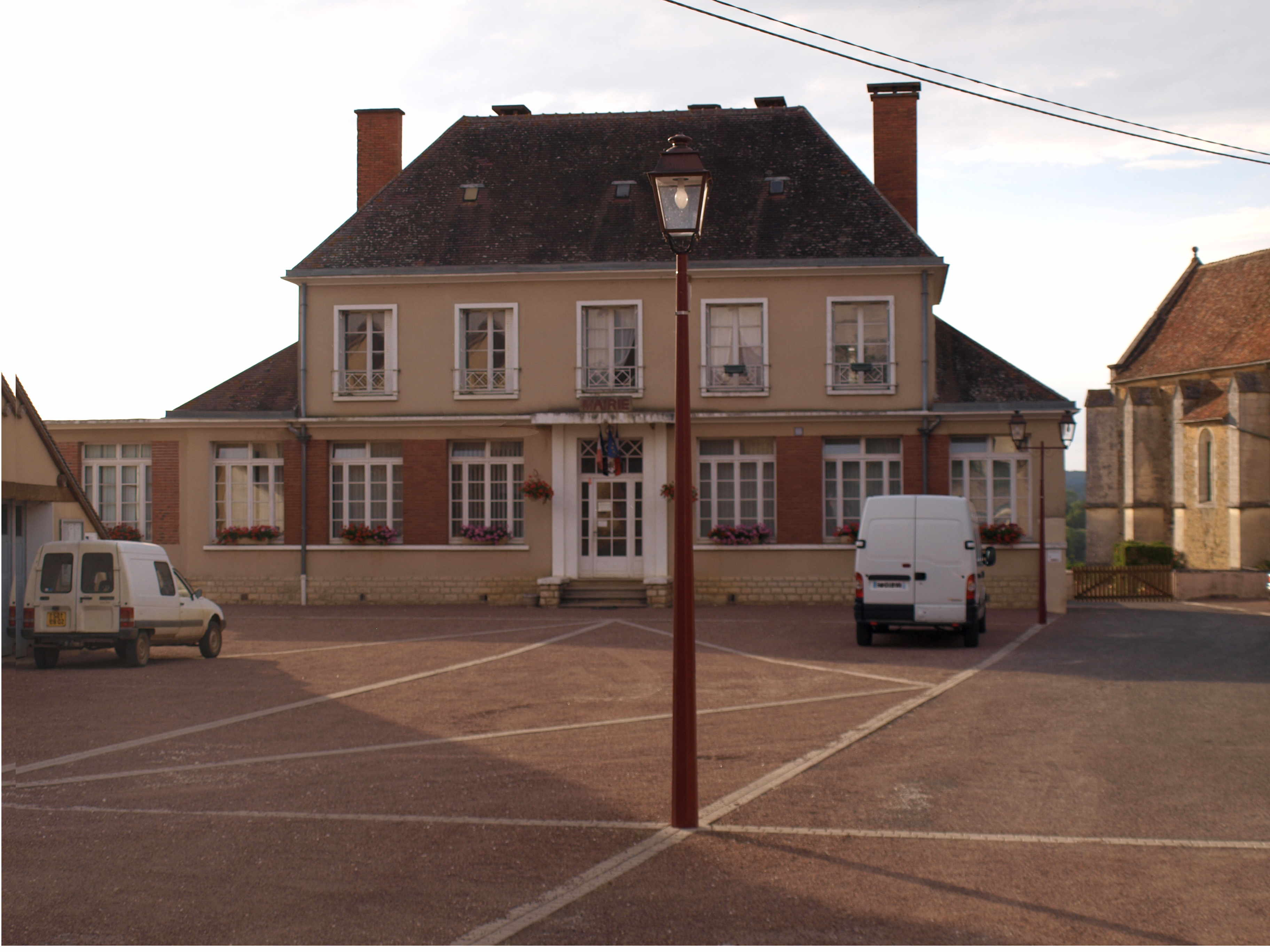
- The town hall in Lalande
- Location of Lalande
- Location within France Location within Bourgogne-Franche-Comté
- Coordinates: 47°40′57″N 3°19′17″E
- Country: France
- Region: Bourgogne-Franche-Comté
- Department: Yonne
- Arrondissement: Auxerre
- Canton: Cœur de Puisaye

Government
  - Mayor (2020–2026): Claude Ferron
- Area^{1}: 10.13 km^{2} (3.91 sq mi)
- Highest elevation: 273 m (896 ft)
- Lowest elevation: 199 m (653 ft)
- Population (2023): 123
  - Density: 12.1/km^{2} (31.4/sq mi)
- Time zone: UTC+01:00 (CET)
  - Summer (DST): UTC+02:00 (CEST)
- INSEE/Postal code: 89217 /89130
- ^{1} French Land Register data, which excludes lakes, ponds, glaciers > 1 km^{2} (0.386 sq mi or 247 acres) and river estuaries.

Lalande (French pronunciation: [lalɑ̃d]) is a commune in the Yonne department in Bourgogne-Franche-Comté in north-central France.

== See also ==
- Communes of the Yonne department
