= Égleny =

- Commune
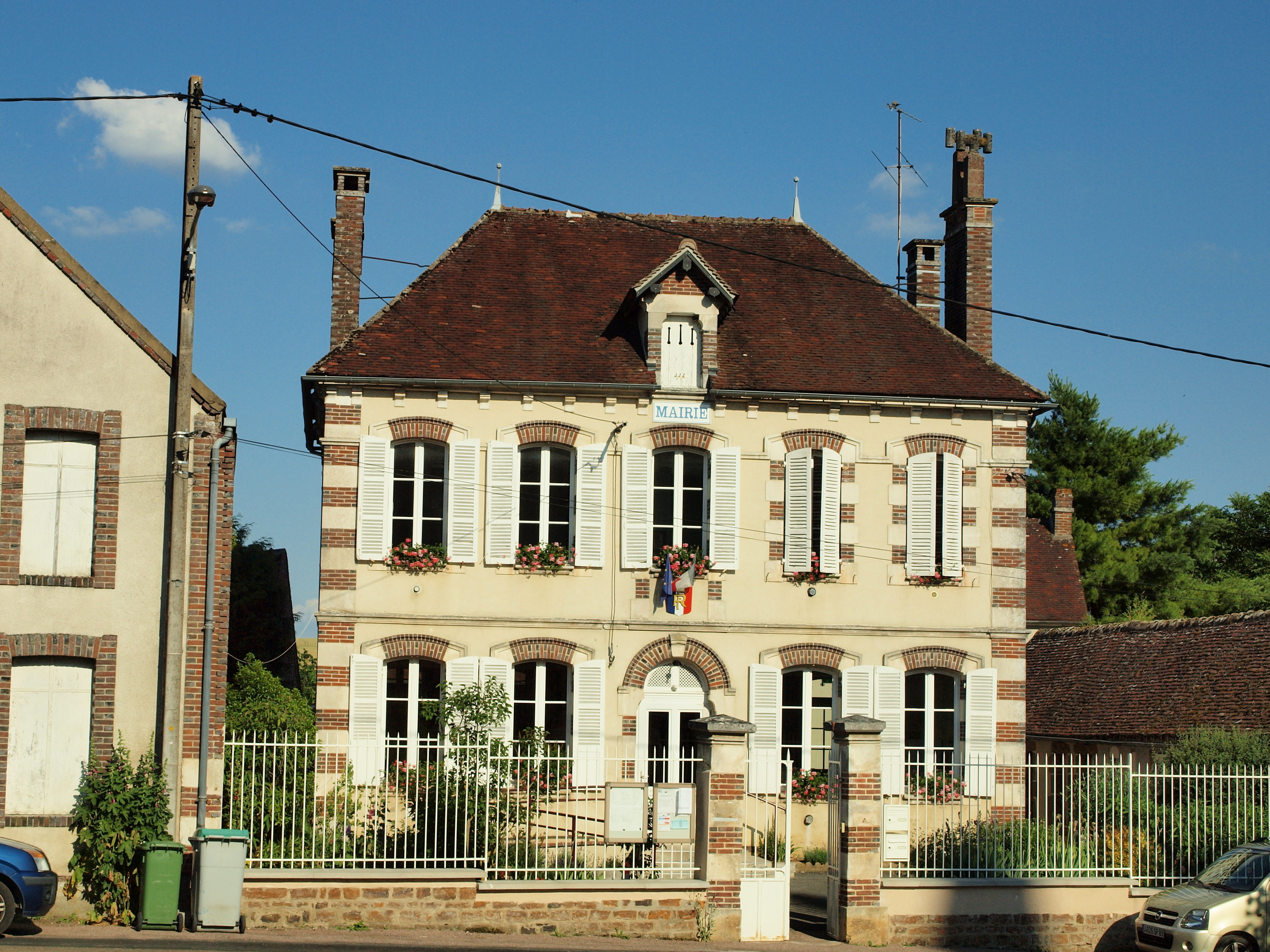
- The town hall in Égleny
- Location of Égleny
- Location within France Location within Bourgogne-Franche-Comté
- Coordinates: 47°48′31″N 3°22′00″E
- Country: France
- Region: Bourgogne-Franche-Comté
- Department: Yonne
- Arrondissement: Auxerre
- Canton: Cœur de Puisaye

Government
  - Mayor (2020–2026): Micheline Couet
- Area^{1}: 8.02 km^{2} (3.10 sq mi)
- Highest elevation: 256 m (840 ft)
- Lowest elevation: 129 m (423 ft)
- Population (2023): 457
  - Density: 57.0/km^{2} (148/sq mi)
- Time zone: UTC+01:00 (CET)
  - Summer (DST): UTC+02:00 (CEST)
- INSEE/Postal code: 89150 /89240
- ^{1} French Land Register data, which excludes lakes, ponds, glaciers > 1 km^{2} (0.386 sq mi or 247 acres) and river estuaries.

Égleny (French pronunciation: [eɡləni]) is a commune in the Yonne department in Bourgogne-Franche-Comté in north-central France.

== See also ==
- Communes of the Yonne department
