= Saint-Privé, Yonne =

Saint-Privé
- Commune
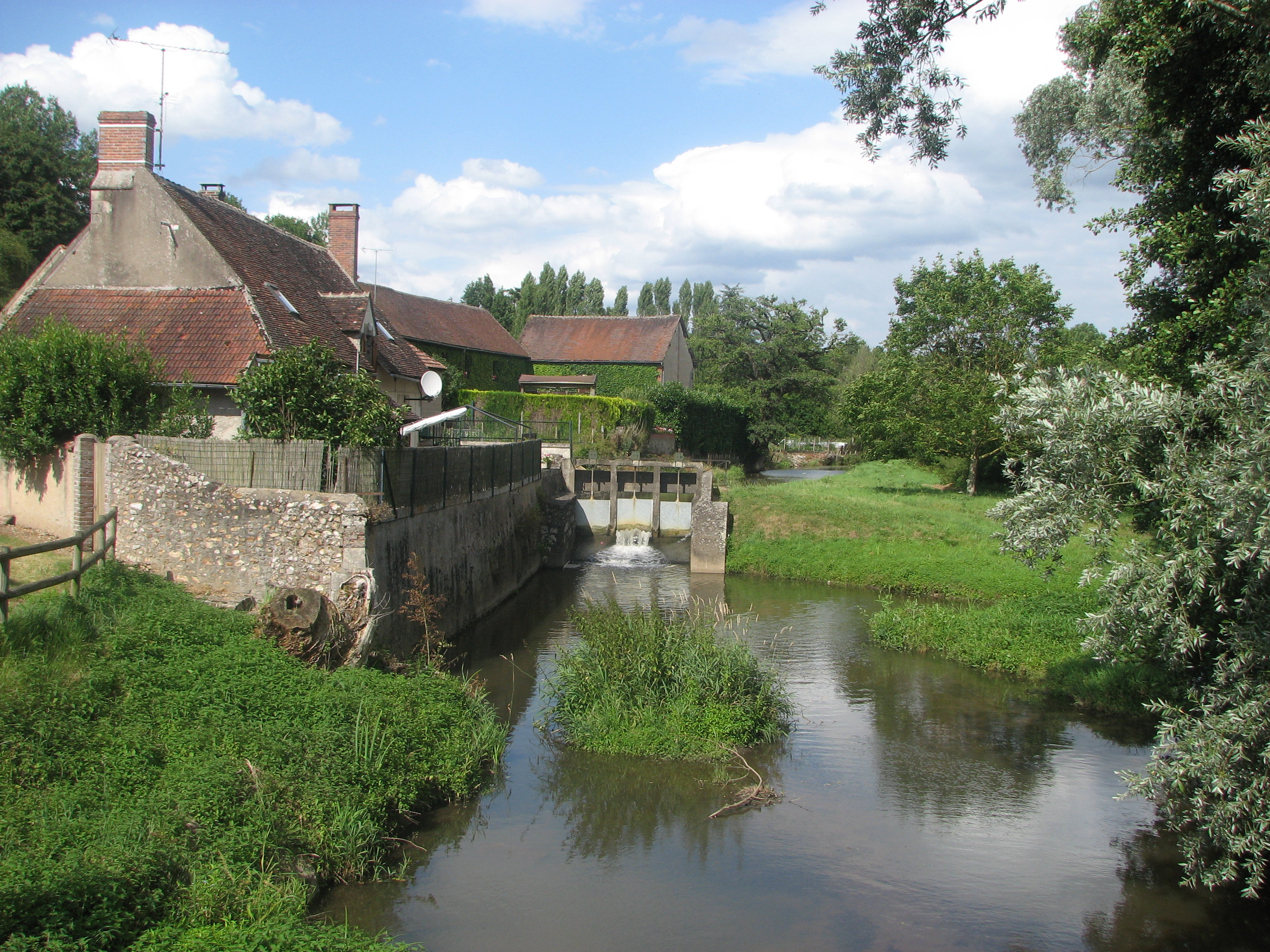
- The Loing river in Saint-Privé
- Location of Saint-Privé
- Location within France Location within Bourgogne-Franche-Comté
- Coordinates: 47°41′03″N 3°00′05″E
- Country: France
- Region: Bourgogne-Franche-Comté
- Department: Yonne
- Arrondissement: Auxerre
- Canton: Cœur de Puisaye

Government
  - Mayor (2020–2026): Jean François Boisard
- Area^{1}: 41.41 km^{2} (15.99 sq mi)
- Highest elevation: 214 m (702 ft)
- Lowest elevation: 161 m (528 ft)
- Population (2023): 515
  - Density: 12.4/km^{2} (32.2/sq mi)
- Time zone: UTC+01:00 (CET)
  - Summer (DST): UTC+02:00 (CEST)
- INSEE/Postal code: 89365 /89220
- ^{1} French Land Register data, which excludes lakes, ponds, glaciers > 1 km^{2} (0.386 sq mi or 247 acres) and river estuaries.

Saint-Privé (French pronunciation: [sɛ̃ pʁive]) is a commune in the Yonne department in Bourgogne-Franche-Comté in north-central France.

The commune is crossed by the river Loing. The river Beaune, an affluent of the Loing, takes its source on the territory of the commune.

The name of the village came from Privat of Mende, a French hermit and bishop from Guevaudan who died as a martyr in 260. His cult became really popular during the Middle Age and many villages and parishes took his name. The first known written trace on the village is from a 13th-century text, in a book on the fief owned by Philippe Auguste.

Humane presence on the territory is present since Palaeolithic, and many silex tools were found, notably by André Huchet on a site on the limit between Saint-Privé and Bléneau. More than 2000 silex tools were collected on a territory of less than 25 hectares.

It seems the village had been named Laoderus before taking the name Saint-Privé. Laoderus was a 6th-century parish under the direction of the diocese of Auxerre, but the exact location had never been officially established.

The church of the commune was built in the 16th century and is dedicated to Saint-Privat. It was named Monument historique and national heritage site in 1903. The church has three naves with four bays each and a vaulted stone cellar. The fleur-de-lys keystone of the choir give indication of the builders of the church: Nicolas d'Anjou, lord of the area, François de Courtenay, lord of Bléneau, the abbey of Laurey and Philippe de Courtenay.

The French painter Henri Harpignies, surnamed the "Michelangelo of trees", lived in Saint-Privé until his death in 1916.

A barrack was built in the commune in 1938 to lodge the mobile guard in preparation of the war to come. Many were expropriated in order to build the camp. On 15 June 1940, Auxerre, Sens and all of Yonne are taken by Germany. Thousands of refugees crossed the department trying to get to the south. On the night of 17 June, an arch of the Saint-Privé bridge exploded, causing severe damage to many house in the village.

== Climate ==
Climate data for Saint-Privé (1991–2020 averages)
Month	Jan	Feb	Mar	Apr	May	Jun	Jul	Aug	Sep	Oct	Nov	Dec	Year
Record high °C (°F)	16.8 (62.2)	21.9 (71.4)	25.9 (78.6)	28.2 (82.8)	31.2 (88.2)	38.4 (101.1)	41.8 (107.2)	38.5 (101.3)	35.2 (95.4)	30.4 (86.7)	22.7 (72.9)	16.9 (62.4)	41.8 (107.2)
Mean daily maximum °C (°F)	6.8 (44.2)	8.3 (46.9)	12.1 (53.8)	16.7 (62.1)	19.6 (67.3)	23.7 (74.7)	26.4 (79.5)	25.3 (77.5)	22.0 (71.6)	17.0 (62.6)	11.3 (52.3)	7.7 (45.9)	16.4 (61.5)
Mean daily minimum °C (°F)	0.9 (33.6)	0.6 (33.1)	2.1 (35.8)	4.2 (39.6)	7.7 (45.9)	11.4 (52.5)	13.2 (55.8)	12.5 (54.5)	9.3 (48.7)	7.6 (45.7)	4.0 (39.2)	1.4 (34.5)	6.2 (43.2)
Record low °C (°F)	−11.9 (10.6)	−14.0 (6.8)	−11.8 (10.8)	−6.6 (20.1)	−1.3 (29.7)	2.1 (35.8)	3.9 (39.0)	4.0 (39.2)	0.8 (33.4)	−4.4 (24.1)	−7.4 (18.7)	−15.5 (4.1)	−15.5 (4.1)
Average precipitation mm (inches)	60.4 (2.38)	54.4 (2.14)	61.6 (2.43)	56.5 (2.22)	87.0 (3.43)	62.8 (2.47)	67.2 (2.65)	55.3 (2.18)	50.8 (2.00)	77.9 (3.07)	62.4 (2.46)	73.4 (2.89)	769.7 (30.30)
Average precipitation days	12.5	11.4	11.0	8.9	10.9	9.1	9.0	8.3	7.3	10.4	11.6	12.6	122.9
Source: Météo France

== See also ==
- Communes of the Yonne department
