= Beauvoir, Yonne =

Beauvoir
- Commune
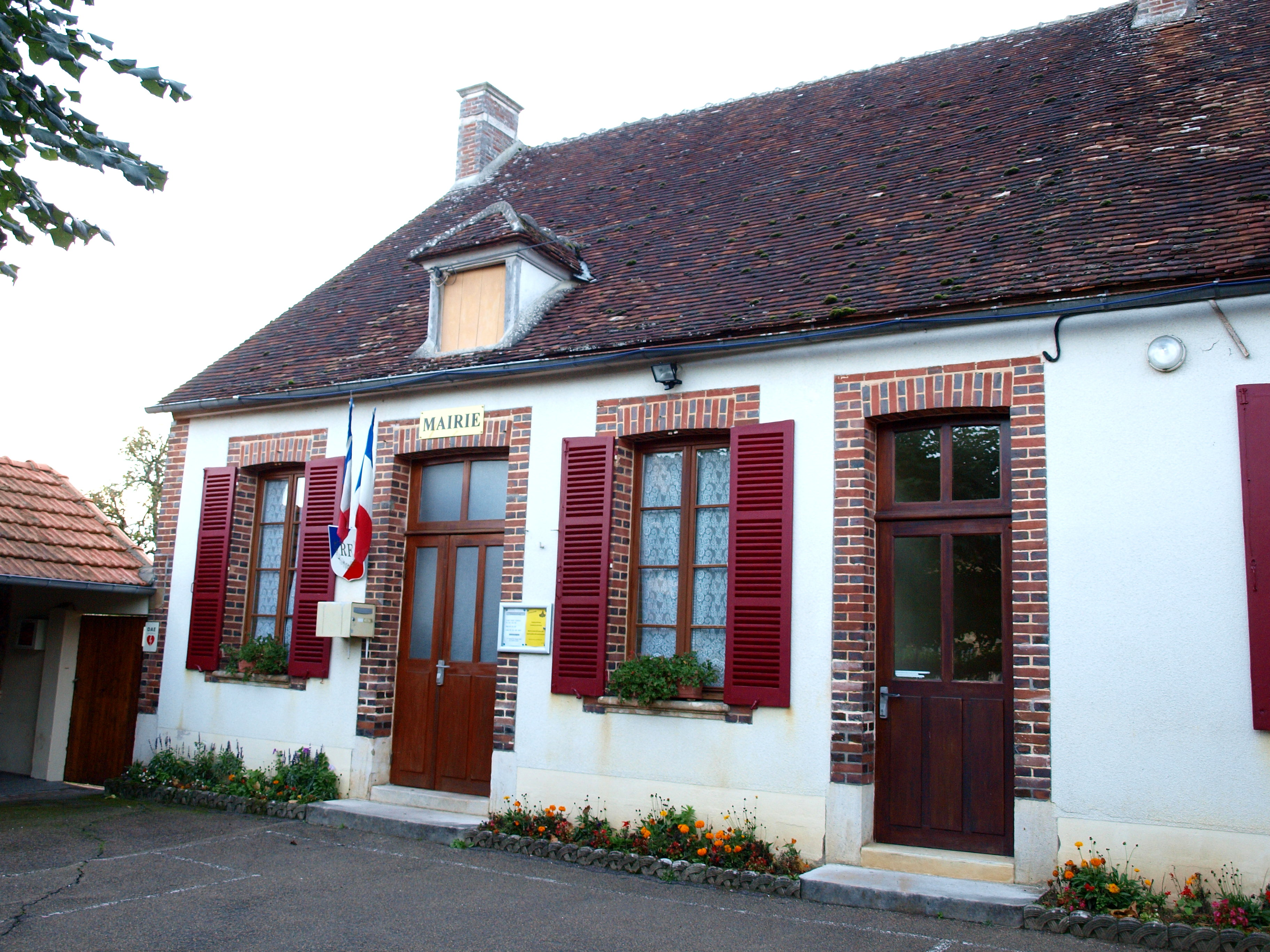
- The town hall and school in Beauvoir

- Coat of arms
- Location of Beauvoir
- Location within France Location within Bourgogne-Franche-Comté
- Coordinates: 47°47′42″N 3°22′18″E
- Country: France
- Region: Bourgogne-Franche-Comté
- Department: Yonne
- Arrondissement: Auxerre
- Canton: Cœur de Puisaye

Government
  - Mayor (2020–2026): Sophie Chantemille
- Area^{1}: 6.72 km^{2} (2.59 sq mi)
- Highest elevation: 256 m (840 ft)
- Lowest elevation: 135 m (443 ft)
- Population (2023): 386
  - Density: 57.4/km^{2} (149/sq mi)
- Time zone: UTC+01:00 (CET)
  - Summer (DST): UTC+02:00 (CEST)
- INSEE/Postal code: 89033 /89240
- ^{1} French Land Register data, which excludes lakes, ponds, glaciers > 1 km^{2} (0.386 sq mi or 247 acres) and river estuaries.

Beauvoir (French pronunciation: [bovwaʁ]) is a commune in the Yonne department in Bourgogne-Franche-Comté in north-central France.

== See also ==
- Communes of the Yonne department
