= Saint-Martin-des-Champs, Yonne =

Saint-Martin-des-Champs
- Commune
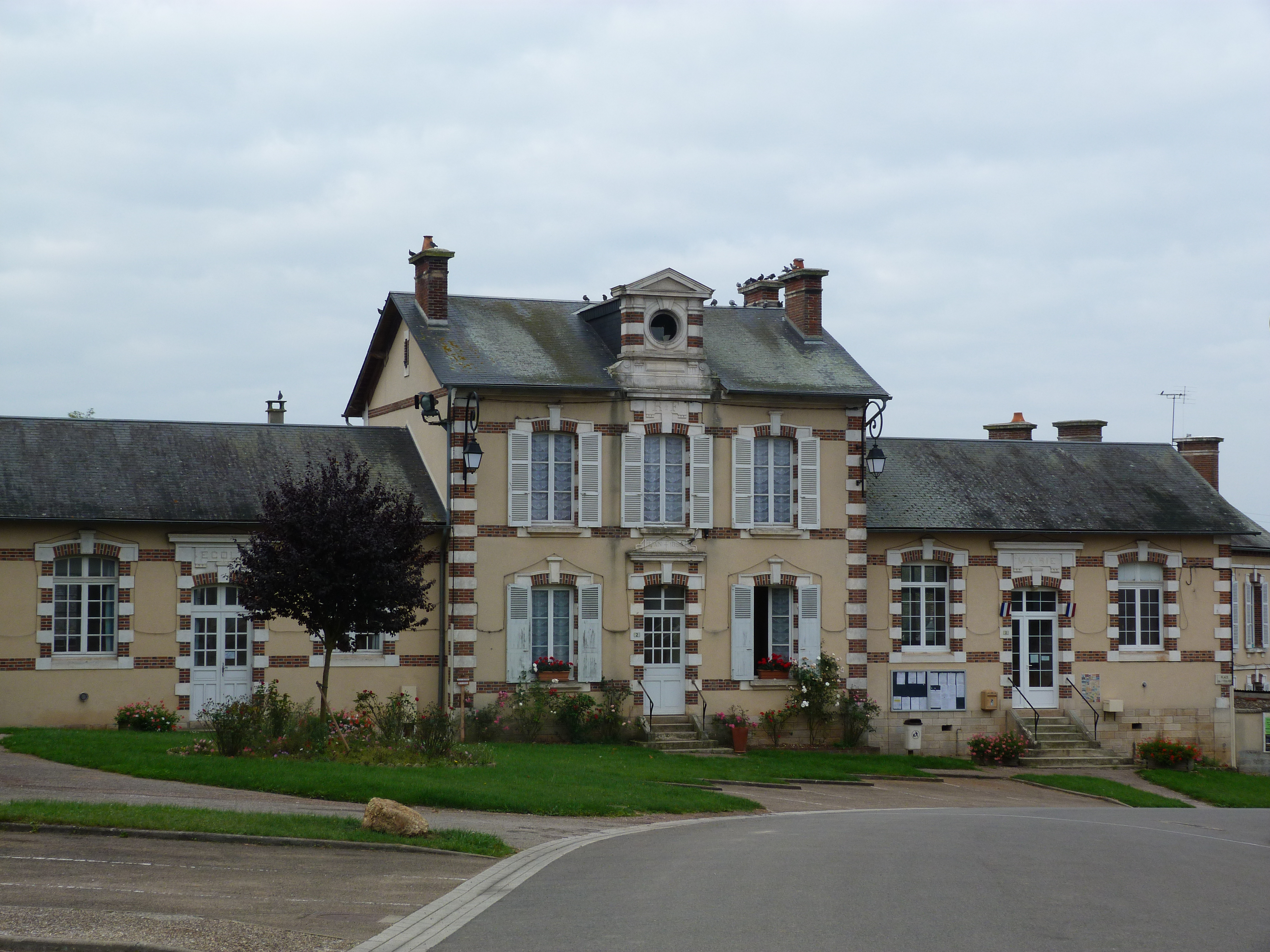
- The town hall in Saint-Martin-des-Champs

- Coat of arms
- Location of Saint-Martin-des-Champs
- Location within France Location within Bourgogne-Franche-Comté
- Coordinates: 47°39′27″N 3°02′07″E
- Country: France
- Region: Bourgogne-Franche-Comté
- Department: Yonne
- Arrondissement: Auxerre
- Canton: Cœur de Puisaye

Government
  - Mayor (2020–2026): Bernadette Hermier
- Area^{1}: 34.22 km^{2} (13.21 sq mi)
- Highest elevation: 234 m (768 ft)
- Lowest elevation: 172 m (564 ft)
- Population (2023): 258
  - Density: 7.54/km^{2} (19.5/sq mi)
- Time zone: UTC+01:00 (CET)
  - Summer (DST): UTC+02:00 (CEST)
- INSEE/Postal code: 89352 /89170
- ^{1} French Land Register data, which excludes lakes, ponds, glaciers > 1 km^{2} (0.386 sq mi or 247 acres) and river estuaries.

Saint-Martin-des-Champs (French pronunciation: [sɛ̃ maʁtɛ̃ de ʃɑ̃]) is a commune in the Yonne department in Bourgogne-Franche-Comté in north-central France.

== See also ==
- Communes of the Yonne department
