= Ronchères, Yonne =

Ronchères
- Commune
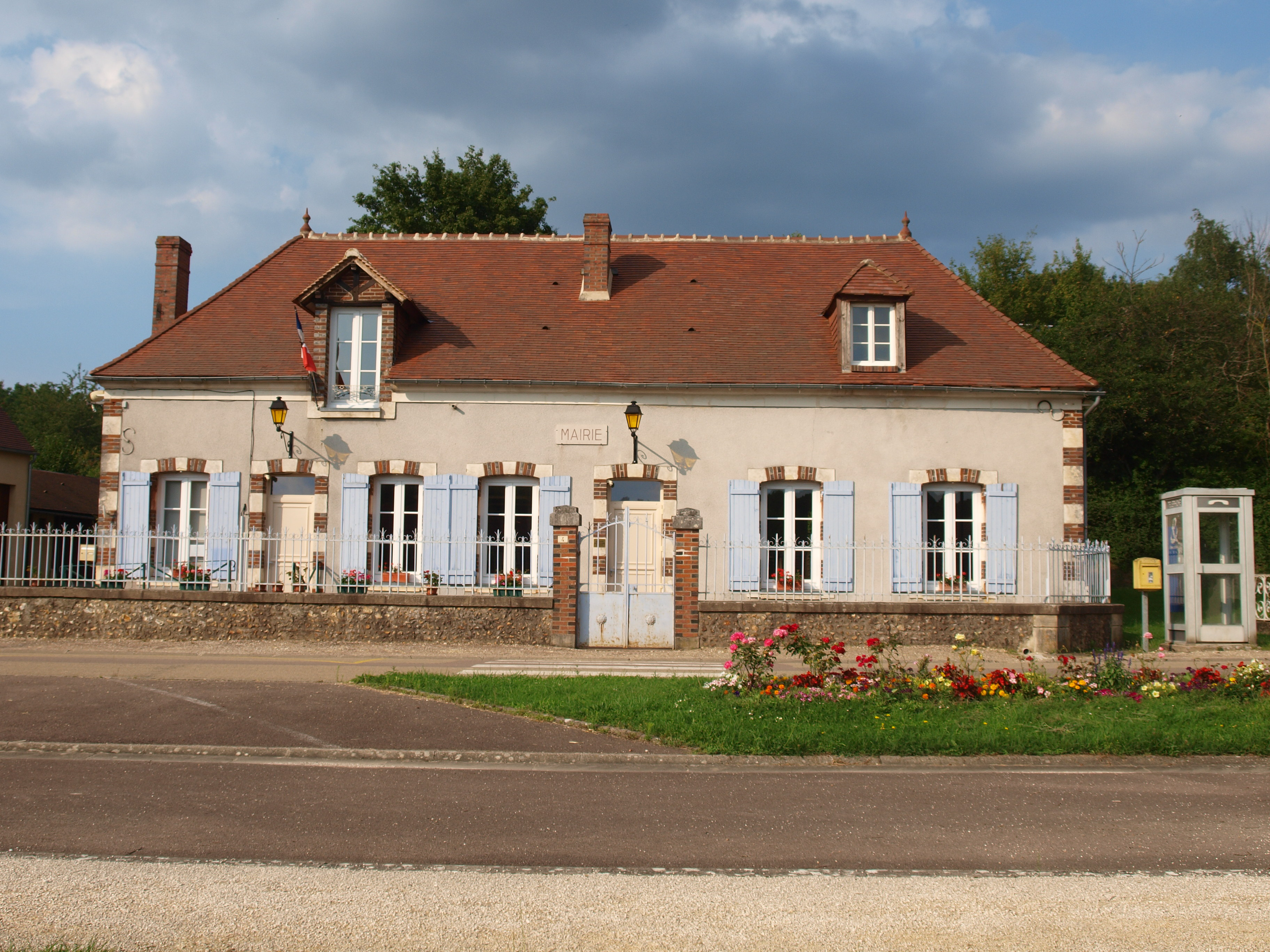
- The town hall in Ronchères
- Location of Ronchères
- Location within France Location within Bourgogne-Franche-Comté
- Coordinates: 47°39′32″N 3°07′07″E
- Country: France
- Region: Bourgogne-Franche-Comté
- Department: Yonne
- Arrondissement: Auxerre
- Canton: Cœur de Puisaye

Government
  - Mayor (2020–2026): Vincent Dufour
- Area^{1}: 11.33 km^{2} (4.37 sq mi)
- Highest elevation: 273 m (896 ft)
- Lowest elevation: 189 m (620 ft)
- Population (2023): 86
  - Density: 7.6/km^{2} (20/sq mi)
- Time zone: UTC+01:00 (CET)
  - Summer (DST): UTC+02:00 (CEST)
- INSEE/Postal code: 89325 /89170
- ^{1} French Land Register data, which excludes lakes, ponds, glaciers > 1 km^{2} (0.386 sq mi or 247 acres) and river estuaries.

Ronchères (French pronunciation: [ʁɔ̃ʃɛʁ]) is a commune in the Yonne department in Bourgogne-Franche-Comté in north-central France.

== See also ==
- Communes of the Yonne department
