= Bois-lès-Pargny =

- Commune
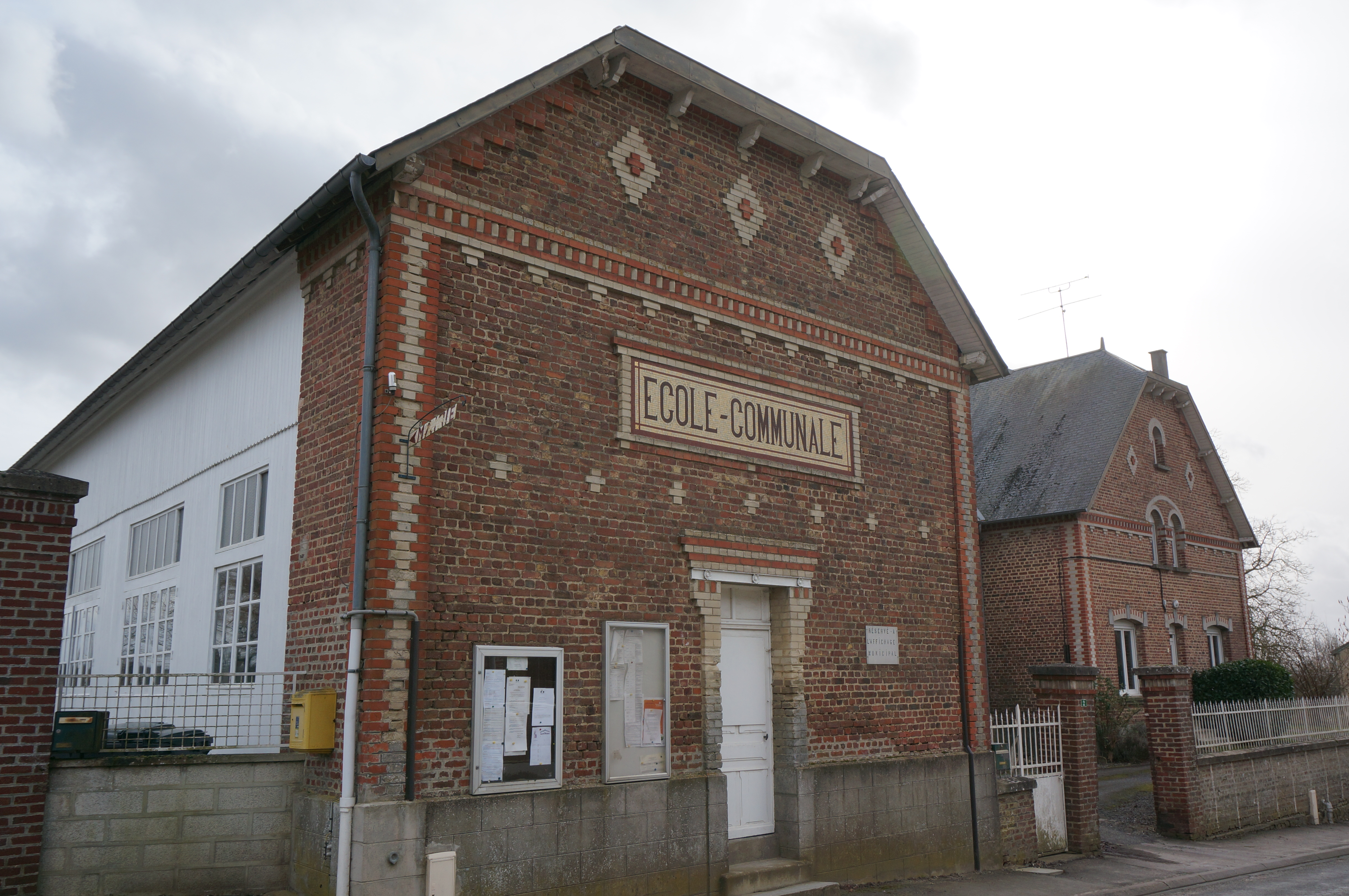
- The town hall of Bois-lès-Pargny
- Location of Bois-lès-Pargny
- Location within France Location within Hauts-de-France
- Coordinates: 49°43′55″N 3°39′05″E
- Country: France
- Region: Hauts-de-France
- Department: Aisne
- Arrondissement: Laon
- Canton: Marle
- Intercommunality: Pays de la Serre

Government
  - Mayor (2026–32): Aldric Laye
- Area^{1}: 10.32 km^{2} (3.98 sq mi)
- Elevation: 138 m (453 ft)
- Highest elevation: 142 m (466 ft)
- Lowest elevation: 90 m (300 ft)
- Population (2023): 187
  - Density: 18.1/km^{2} (46.9/sq mi)
- Time zone: UTC+01:00 (CET)
  - Summer (DST): UTC+02:00 (CEST)
- INSEE/Postal code: 02096 /02270
- ^{1} French Land Register data, which excludes lakes, ponds, glaciers > 1 km^{2} (0.386 sq mi or 247 acres) and river estuaries.

Bois-lès-Pargny is a commune in the department of Aisne in Hauts-de-France in northern France.

== Population ==
Historical population
Year	Pop.	±% p.a.
1968	256	—
1975	222	−2.02%
1982	219	−0.19%
1990	194	−1.50%
1999	172	−1.33%
2007	168	−0.29%
2012	189	+2.38%
2017	201	+1.24%
2023	187	−1.20%
Source: INSEE

== See also ==
- Communes of the Aisne department
