= Puiseaux (river) =

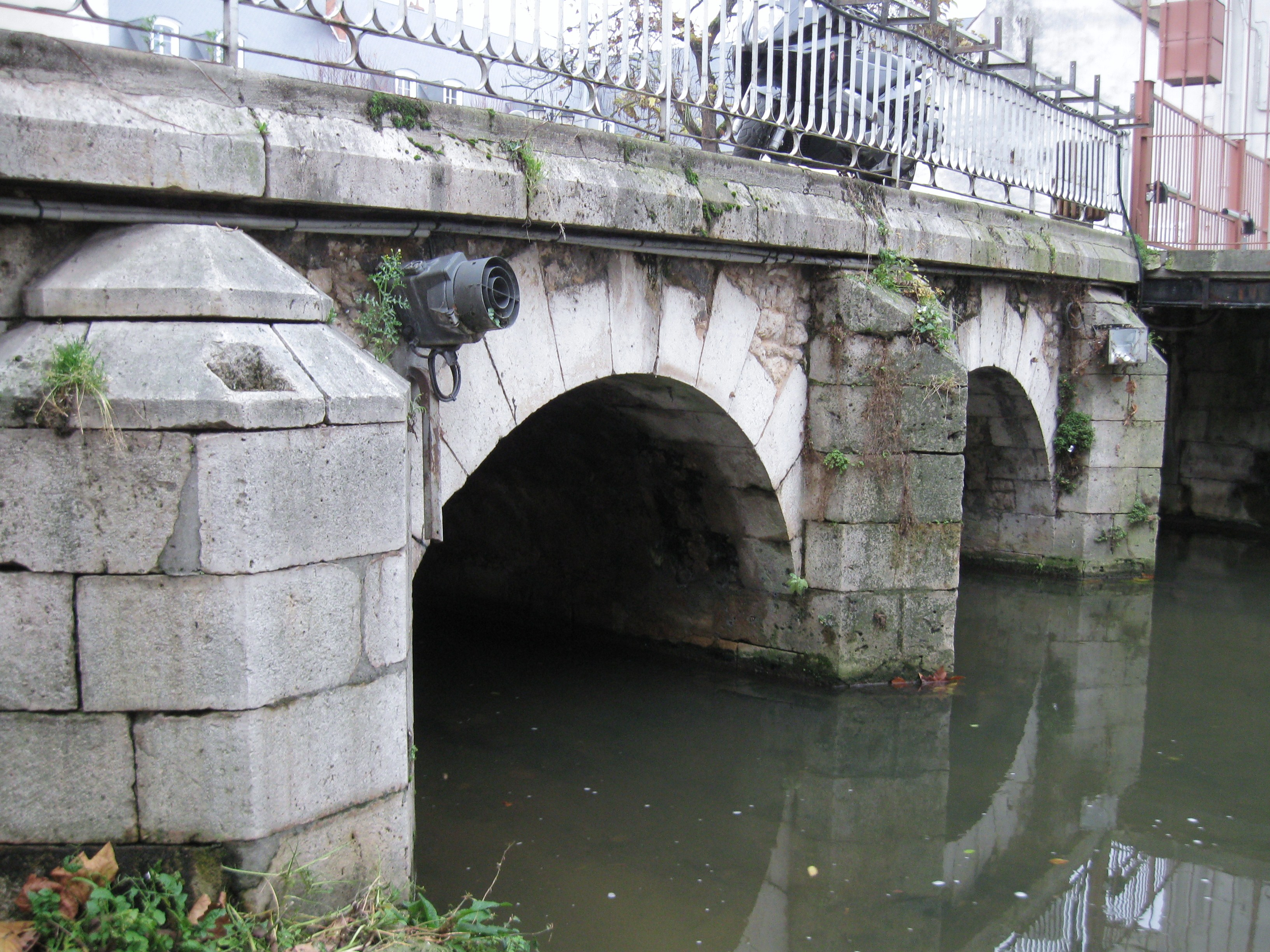

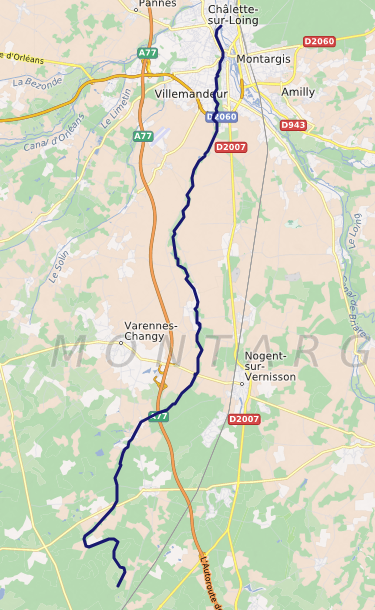

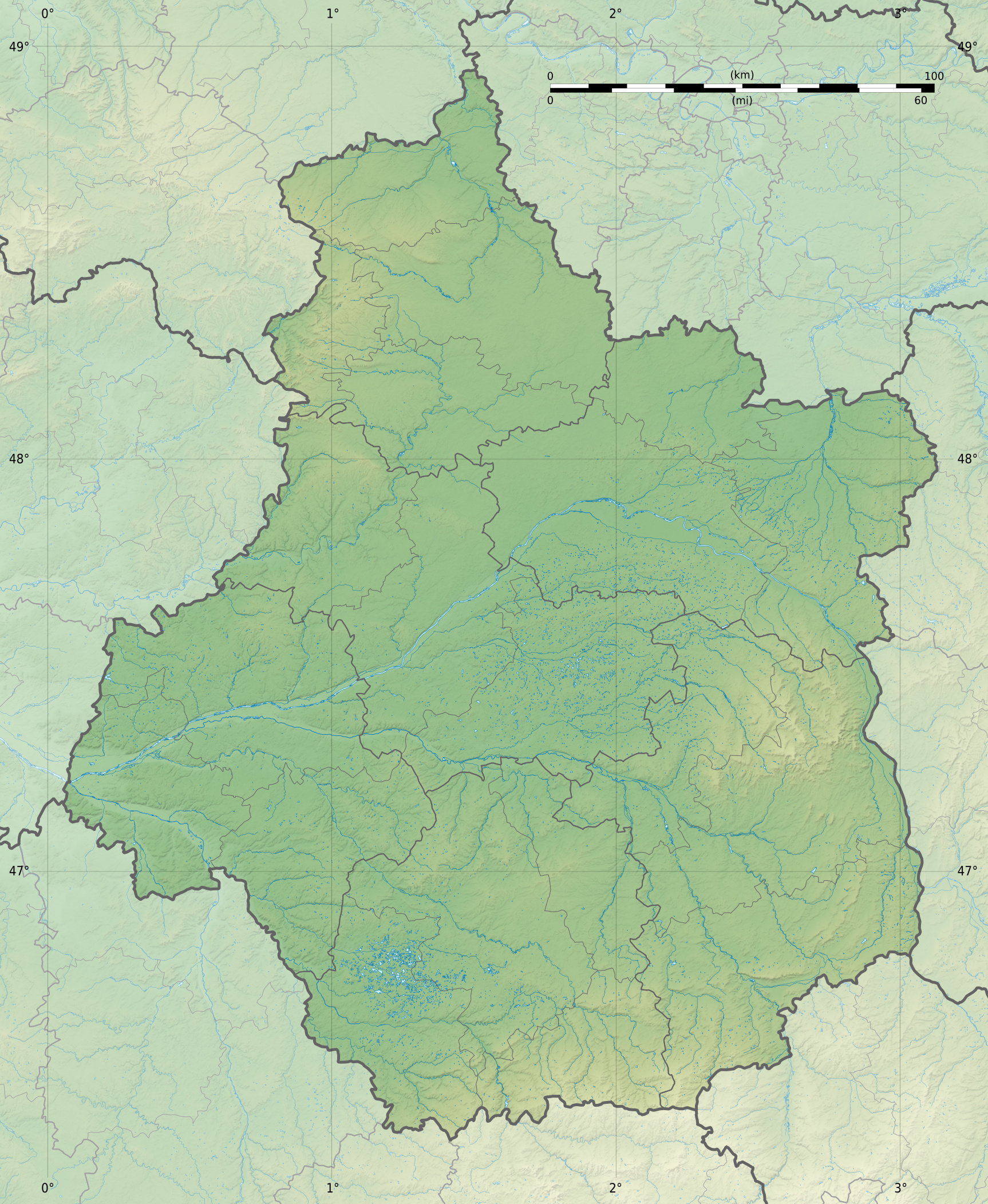
- Location within France Location within Centre-Val de Loire

Location
- Country: France

Physical characteristics
- Mouth
  - location: Loing
  - coordinates: 47°59′57″N 2°43′47″E
- Length: 37 km (23 mi)

Basin features
- Progression: Loing→ Seine→ English Channel

The Puiseaux is a small river in the Loiret department, central France, left tributary of the Loing. It is 37.1 km (23.1 mi) long. Its source is in the commune of Les Choux. It flows north to Montargis, where it empties into the Loing. It is unrelated to the commune of Puiseaux.
