= Lavau, Yonne =

Lavau
- Commune
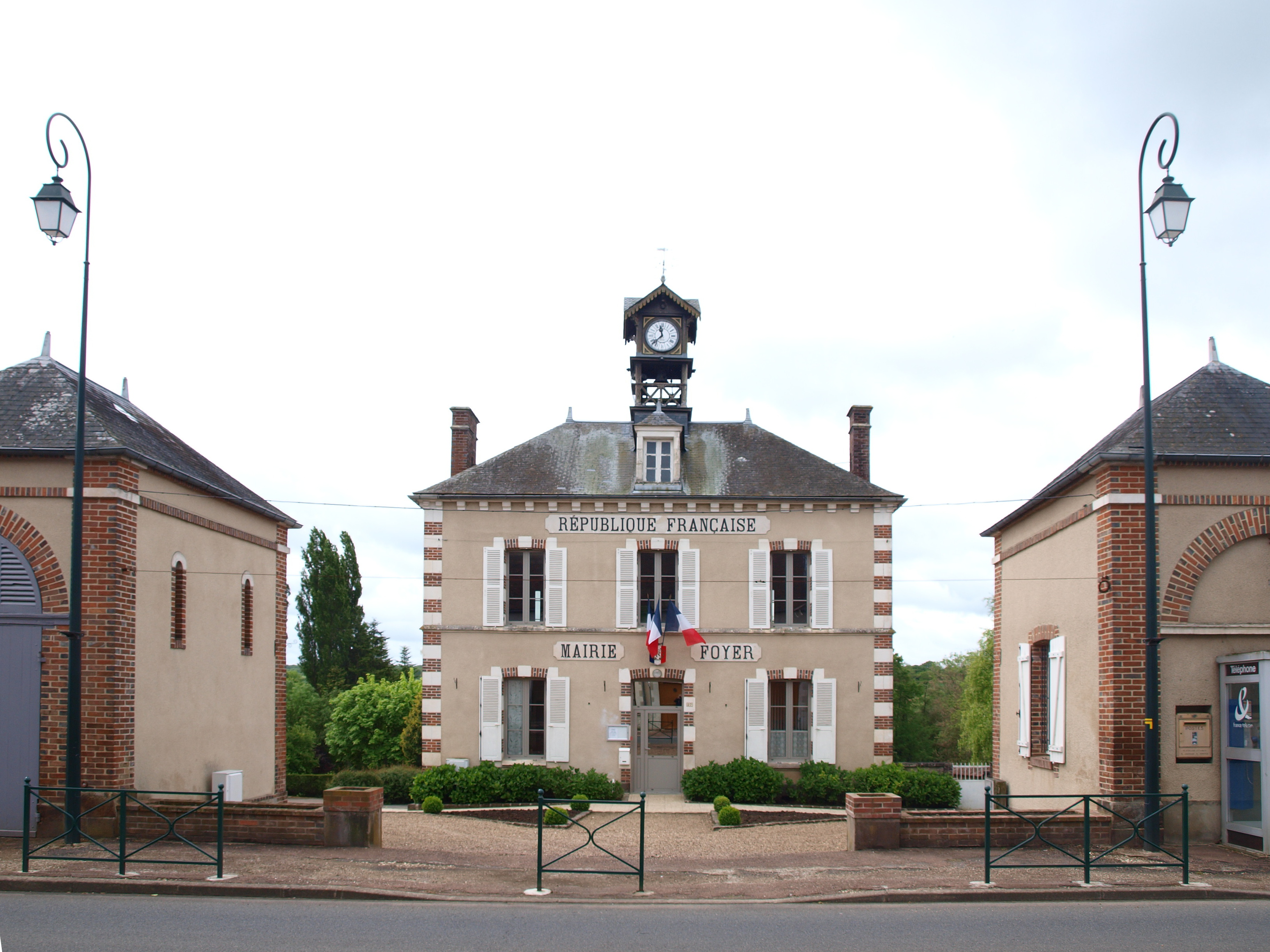
- The town hall in Lavau

- Coat of arms
- Location of Lavau
- Location within France Location within Bourgogne-Franche-Comté
- Coordinates: 47°35′47″N 2°59′17″E
- Country: France
- Region: Bourgogne-Franche-Comté
- Department: Yonne
- Arrondissement: Auxerre
- Canton: Cœur de Puisaye

Government
  - Mayor (2020–2026): Gérard d'Astorg
- Area^{1}: 55.06 km^{2} (21.26 sq mi)
- Highest elevation: 261 m (856 ft)
- Lowest elevation: 175 m (574 ft)
- Population (2023): 392
  - Density: 7.12/km^{2} (18.4/sq mi)
- Time zone: UTC+01:00 (CET)
  - Summer (DST): UTC+02:00 (CEST)
- INSEE/Postal code: 89220 /89170
- ^{1} French Land Register data, which excludes lakes, ponds, glaciers > 1 km^{2} (0.386 sq mi or 247 acres) and river estuaries.

Lavau (French pronunciation: [lavo]) is a commune in the Yonne department in Bourgogne-Franche-Comté in north-central France, in the historical region of Puisaye.

== See also ==
- Communes of the Yonne department
