= Sons-et-Ronchères =

- Commune
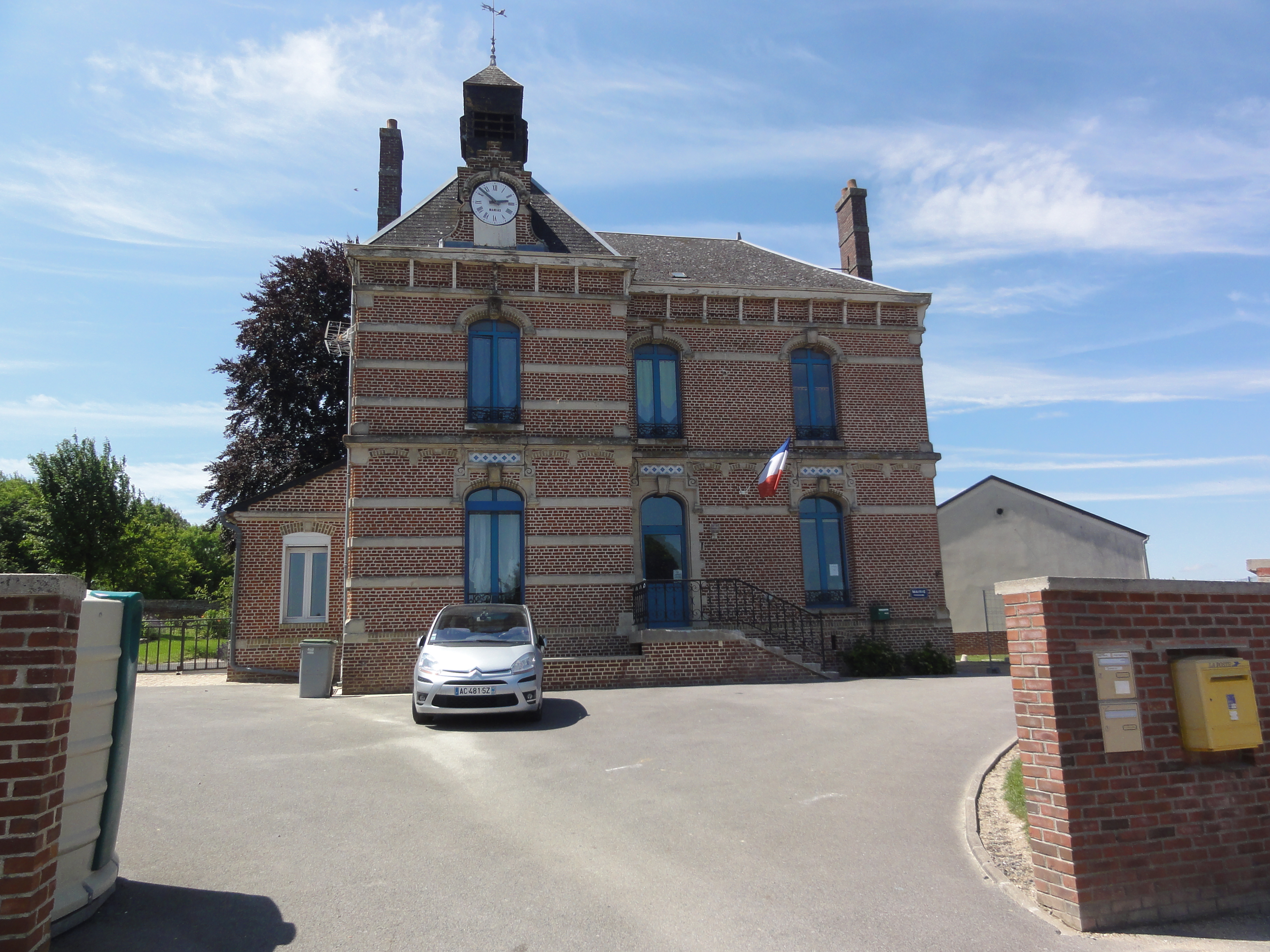
- The town hall of Sons-et-Ronchères

- Coat of arms
- Location of Sons-et-Ronchères
- Location within France Location within Hauts-de-France
- Coordinates: 49°45′47″N 3°40′30″E
- Country: France
- Region: Hauts-de-France
- Department: Aisne
- Arrondissement: Laon
- Canton: Marle
- Intercommunality: Pays de la Serre

Government
  - Mayor (2026–32): Ludicael Lefevre
- Area^{1}: 9.2 km^{2} (3.6 sq mi)
- Elevation: 123 m (404 ft)
- Highest elevation: 145 m (476 ft)
- Lowest elevation: 78 m (256 ft)
- Population (2023): 205
  - Density: 22/km^{2} (58/sq mi)
- Time zone: UTC+01:00 (CET)
  - Summer (DST): UTC+02:00 (CEST)
- INSEE/Postal code: 02727 /02270
- ^{1} French Land Register data, which excludes lakes, ponds, glaciers > 1 km^{2} (0.386 sq mi or 247 acres) and river estuaries.

Sons-et-Ronchères (French pronunciation: [sɔ̃ e ʁɔ̃ʃɛʁ]) is a commune in the Aisne department in Hauts-de-France in northern France.

== Population ==
Historical population
| Year | Pop. | ±% p.a. |
|---|---|---|
| 1968 | 260 | — |
| 1975 | 239 | −1.20% |
| 1982 | 218 | −1.31% |
| 1990 | 253 | +1.88% |
| 1999 | 236 | −0.77% |
| 2007 | 230 | −0.32% |
| 2012 | 221 | −0.80% |
| 2017 | 240 | +1.66% |
| 2023 | 205 | −2.59% |
Source: INSEE

== See also ==
- Communes of the Aisne department
