= Neuilly, Yonne =

Neuilly
- Part of Valravillon
- Location of Neuilly
- Location within France Location within Bourgogne-Franche-Comté
- Coordinates: 47°55′01″N 3°26′20″E
- Country: France
- Region: Bourgogne-Franche-Comté
- Department: Yonne
- Arrondissement: Auxerre
- Canton: Charny Orée de Puisaye
- Commune: Valravillon
- Area^{1}: 13.39 km^{2} (5.17 sq mi)
- Highest elevation: 152 m (499 ft)
- Lowest elevation: 87 m (285 ft)
- Population (2022): 448
  - Density: 33.5/km^{2} (86.7/sq mi)
- Time zone: UTC+01:00 (CET)
  - Summer (DST): UTC+02:00 (CEST)
- Postal code: 89113
- ^{1} French Land Register data, which excludes lakes, ponds, glaciers > 1 km^{2} (0.386 sq mi or 247 acres) and river estuaries.

Neuilly (French pronunciation: [nœji]) is a former commune in the Yonne department in Bourgogne-Franche-Comté in north-central France. On 1 January 2016, it was merged into the new commune of Valravillon.

== See also ==
- Communes of the Yonne department
