= Villemer =

Villemer is the name of two communes in France:

- Villemer, in the Seine-et-Marne département
- Villemer, in the Yonne département
