= Chassy =

Chassy may refer to the following places in France:

- Chassy, Cher, a commune in the department of Cher
- Chassy, Saône-et-Loire, a commune in the department of Saône-et-Loire
- Chassy, Yonne, a commune in the department of Yonne
