= Benoît Huré =

French politician (born 1953)

Benoît Huré (born 5 June 1953 in Sépeaux) is a French politician and a member of the Senate of France. He represents the Ardennes department and is a member of the Union for a Popular Movement Party.

== Bibliography ==
- Page on the Senate website (in French)
