= Saint-Martin-sur-Ocre =

Saint-Martin-sur-Ocre may refer to:

- Saint-Martin-sur-Ocre, Loiret, a commune in the French region of Centre
- Saint-Martin-sur-Ocre, Yonne, a commune in the French region of Bourgogne
