= Saint-Romain-le-Preux =

- Part of Sépeaux-Saint-Romain
- Location of Saint-Romain-le-Preux
- Location within France Location within Bourgogne-Franche-Comté
- Coordinates: 47°56′05″N 3°14′33″E
- Country: France
- Region: Bourgogne-Franche-Comté
- Department: Yonne
- Arrondissement: Sens
- Canton: Charny Orée de Puisaye
- Commune: Sépeaux-Saint-Romain
- Area^{1}: 10.36 km^{2} (4.00 sq mi)
- Highest elevation: 210 m (690 ft)
- Lowest elevation: 122 m (400 ft)
- Population (2019): 165
  - Density: 15.9/km^{2} (41.2/sq mi)
- Time zone: UTC+01:00 (CET)
  - Summer (DST): UTC+02:00 (CEST)
- Postal code: 89116
- ^{1} French Land Register data, which excludes lakes, ponds, glaciers > 1 km^{2} (0.386 sq mi or 247 acres) and river estuaries.

Saint-Romain-le-Preux (French pronunciation: [sɛ̃ ʁɔmɛ̃ lə pʁø]) is a former commune in the Yonne department in Bourgogne-Franche-Comté in north-central France. On 1 January 2016, it was merged into the new commune of Sépeaux-Saint-Romain.

== See also ==
- Communes of the Yonne department
