= Villiers-sur-Tholon =

- Part of Montholon
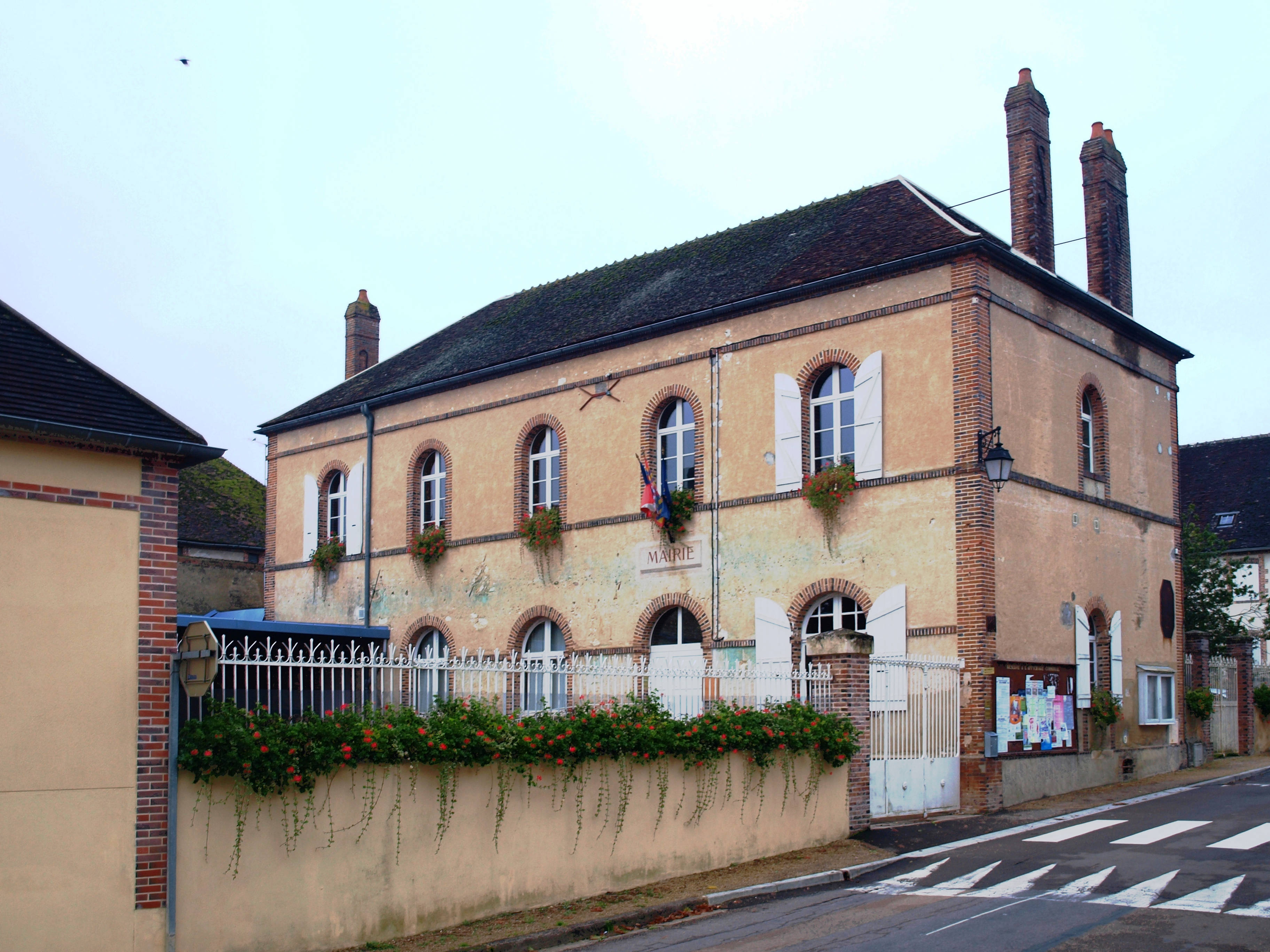

- Coat of arms
- Location of Villiers-sur-Tholon
- Location within France Location within Bourgogne-Franche-Comté
- Coordinates: 47°53′21″N 3°20′14″E
- Country: France
- Region: Bourgogne-Franche-Comté
- Department: Yonne
- Arrondissement: Auxerre
- Canton: Charny Orée de Puisaye
- Commune: Montholon
- Area^{1}: 15.50 km^{2} (5.98 sq mi)
- Highest elevation: 236 m (774 ft)
- Lowest elevation: 104 m (341 ft)
- Population (2021): 461
  - Density: 29.7/km^{2} (77.0/sq mi)
- Time zone: UTC+01:00 (CET)
  - Summer (DST): UTC+02:00 (CEST)
- Postal code: 89110
- ^{1} French Land Register data, which excludes lakes, ponds, glaciers > 1 km^{2} (0.386 sq mi or 247 acres) and river estuaries.

Villiers-sur-Tholon (French pronunciation: [vilje syʁ tɔlɔ̃]) is a former commune in the Yonne department in Bourgogne-Franche-Comté in north-central France. On 1 January 2017, it was merged into the new commune Montholon. The bibliographer Ferdinand Pouy (1824–1891) was born in this village.

== Population ==
Historical population
Year	Pop.	±% p.a.
2006	440	—
2011	497	+2.47%
2021	461	−0.75%
Source: INSEE

== See also ==
- Communes of the Yonne department
