= Saint-Aubin-Château-Neuf =

- Part of Le Val-d'Ocre
- Location of Saint-Aubin-Château-Neuf
- Location within France Location within Bourgogne-Franche-Comté
- Coordinates: 47°49′28″N 3°18′38″E
- Country: France
- Region: Bourgogne-Franche-Comté
- Department: Yonne
- Arrondissement: Auxerre
- Canton: Charny Orée de Puisaye
- Commune: Le Val-d'Ocre
- Area^{1}: 24.89 km^{2} (9.61 sq mi)
- Highest elevation: 262 m (860 ft)
- Lowest elevation: 135 m (443 ft)
- Population (2022): 508
  - Density: 20.4/km^{2} (52.9/sq mi)
- Time zone: UTC+01:00 (CET)
  - Summer (DST): UTC+02:00 (CEST)
- Postal code: 89110
- ^{1} French Land Register data, which excludes lakes, ponds, glaciers > 1 km^{2} (0.386 sq mi or 247 acres) and river estuaries.

Saint-Aubin-Château-Neuf (French pronunciation: [sɛ̃.t‿obɛ̃ ʃato nœf]) is a former commune in the Yonne department in Bourgogne-Franche-Comté in north-central France. On 1 January 2016, it was merged into the new commune of Le Val-d'Ocre.

== See also ==
- Communes of the Yonne department
- Robert Falcucci
