= Aillant =

Aillant may refer to several communes in France:

- Aillant-sur-Milleron, in the Loiret department
- Aillant-sur-Tholon, in the Yonne department
