= Champvallon =

- Part of Montholon
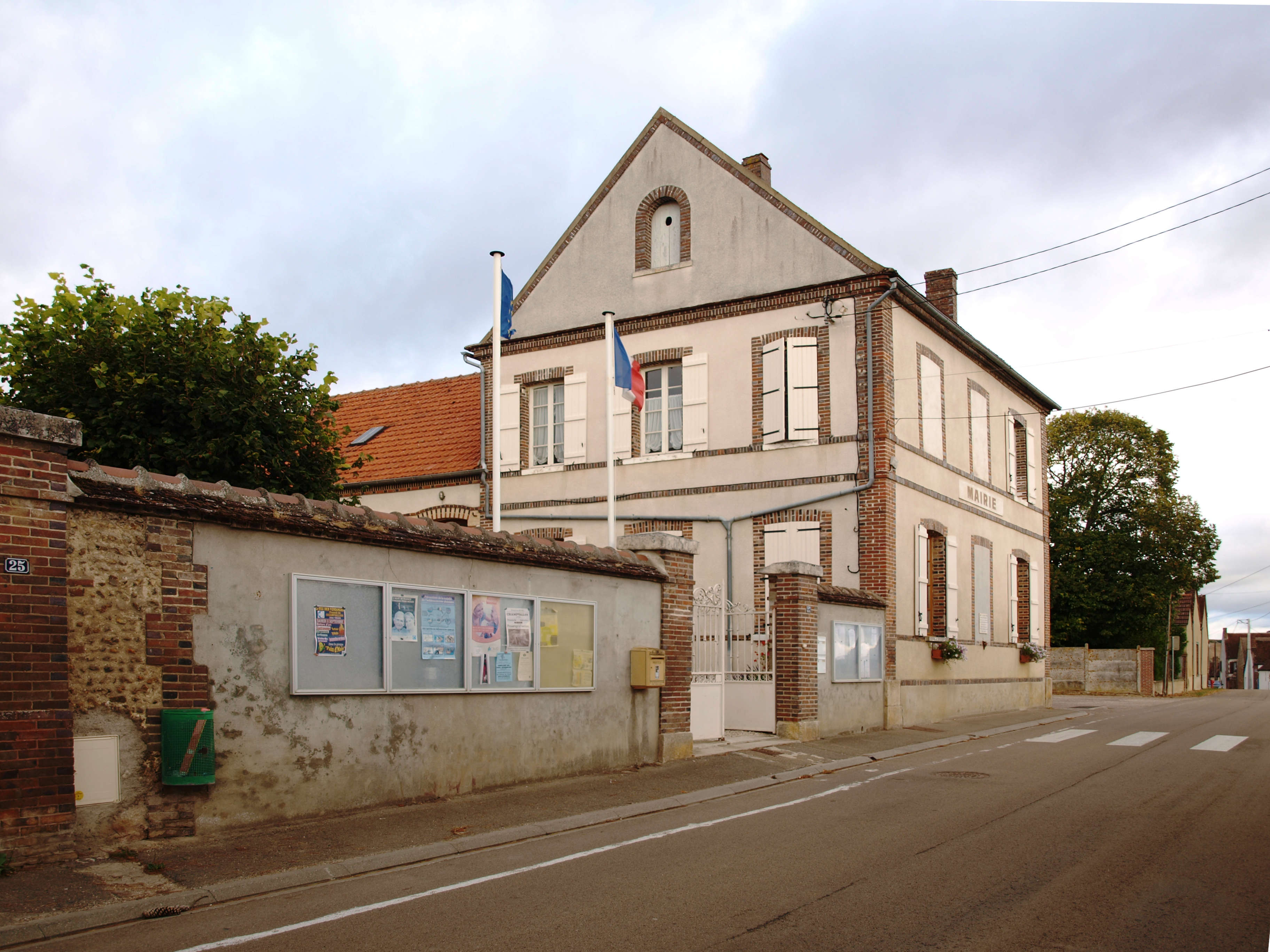

- Coat of arms
- Location of Champvallon
- Location within France Location within Bourgogne-Franche-Comté
- Coordinates: 47°56′07″N 3°20′46″E
- Country: France
- Region: Bourgogne-Franche-Comté
- Department: Yonne
- Arrondissement: Auxerre
- Canton: Charny Orée de Puisaye
- Commune: Montholon
- Area^{1}: 6.83 km^{2} (2.64 sq mi)
- Highest elevation: 217 m (712 ft)
- Lowest elevation: 85 m (279 ft)
- Population (2021): 357
  - Density: 52.3/km^{2} (135/sq mi)
- Time zone: UTC+01:00 (CET)
  - Summer (DST): UTC+02:00 (CEST)
- Postal code: 89710
- ^{1} French Land Register data, which excludes lakes, ponds, glaciers > 1 km^{2} (0.386 sq mi or 247 acres) and river estuaries.

Champvallon (French pronunciation: [ʃɑ̃valɔ̃]) is a former commune in the Yonne department in Bourgogne-Franche-Comté in north-central France. On 1 January 2017, it was merged into the new commune Montholon.

== Population ==
Historical population
Year	Pop.	±% p.a.
2006	563	—
2011	636	+2.47%
2021	357	−5.61%
Source: INSEE

== See also ==
- Communes of the Yonne department
