= Guerchy =

- Part of Valravillon
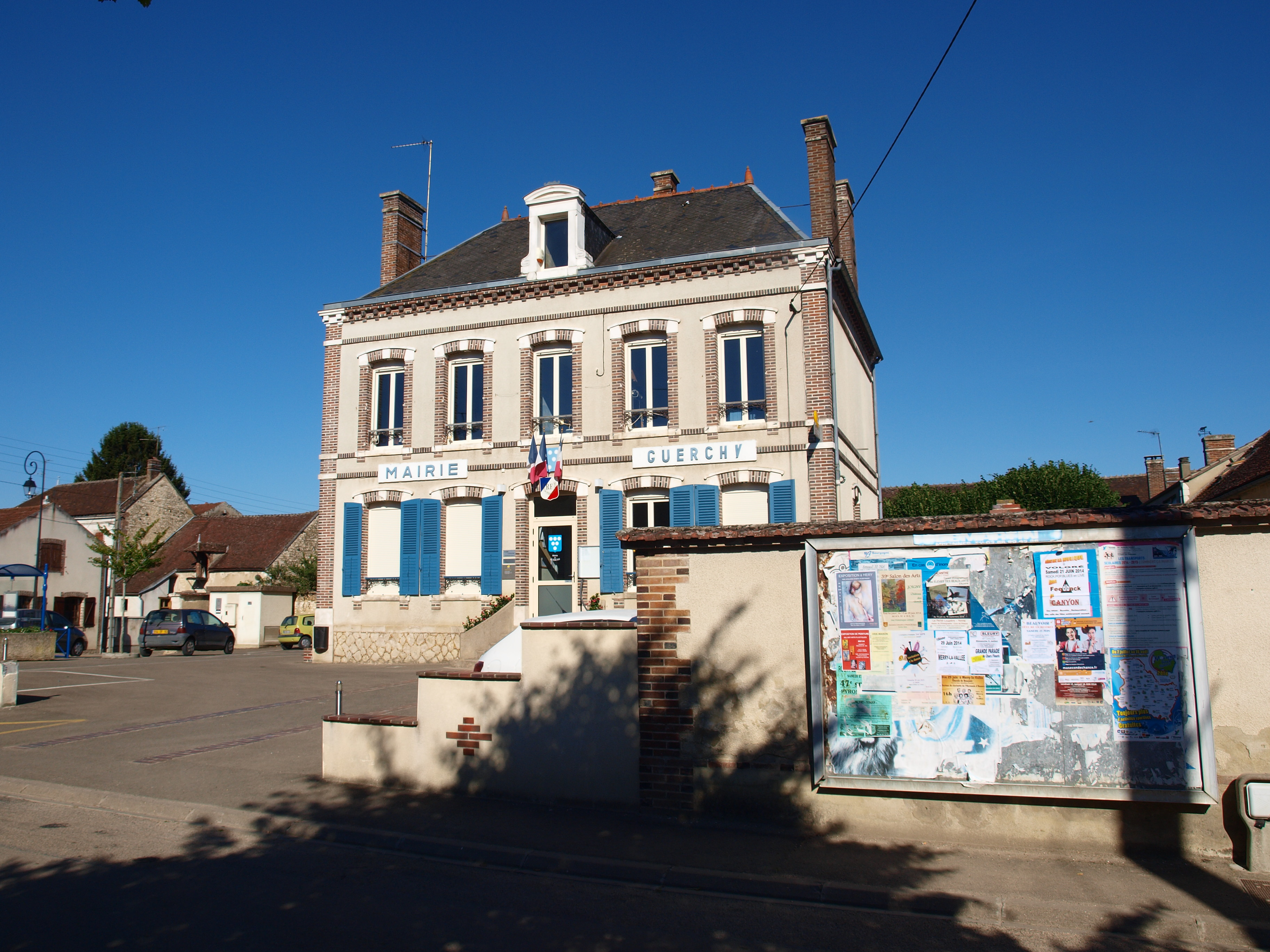
- Town hall
- Location of Guerchy
- Location within France Location within Bourgogne-Franche-Comté
- Coordinates: 47°53′38″N 3°26′27″E
- Country: France
- Region: Bourgogne-Franche-Comté
- Department: Yonne
- Arrondissement: Auxerre
- Canton: Charny Orée de Puisaye
- Commune: Valravillon
- Area^{1}: 11.86 km^{2} (4.58 sq mi)
- Highest elevation: 182 m (597 ft)
- Lowest elevation: 99 m (325 ft)
- Population (2022): 759
  - Density: 64.0/km^{2} (166/sq mi)
- Time zone: UTC+01:00 (CET)
  - Summer (DST): UTC+02:00 (CEST)
- Postal code: 89113
- ^{1} French Land Register data, which excludes lakes, ponds, glaciers > 1 km^{2} (0.386 sq mi or 247 acres) and river estuaries.

Guerchy (French pronunciation: [ɡɛʁʃi]) is a former commune in the Yonne department in Bourgogne-Franche-Comté in north-central France. On 1 January 2016, it was merged into the new commune of Valravillon.

== See also ==
- Communes of the Yonne department
