= Volgré =

- Part of Montholon
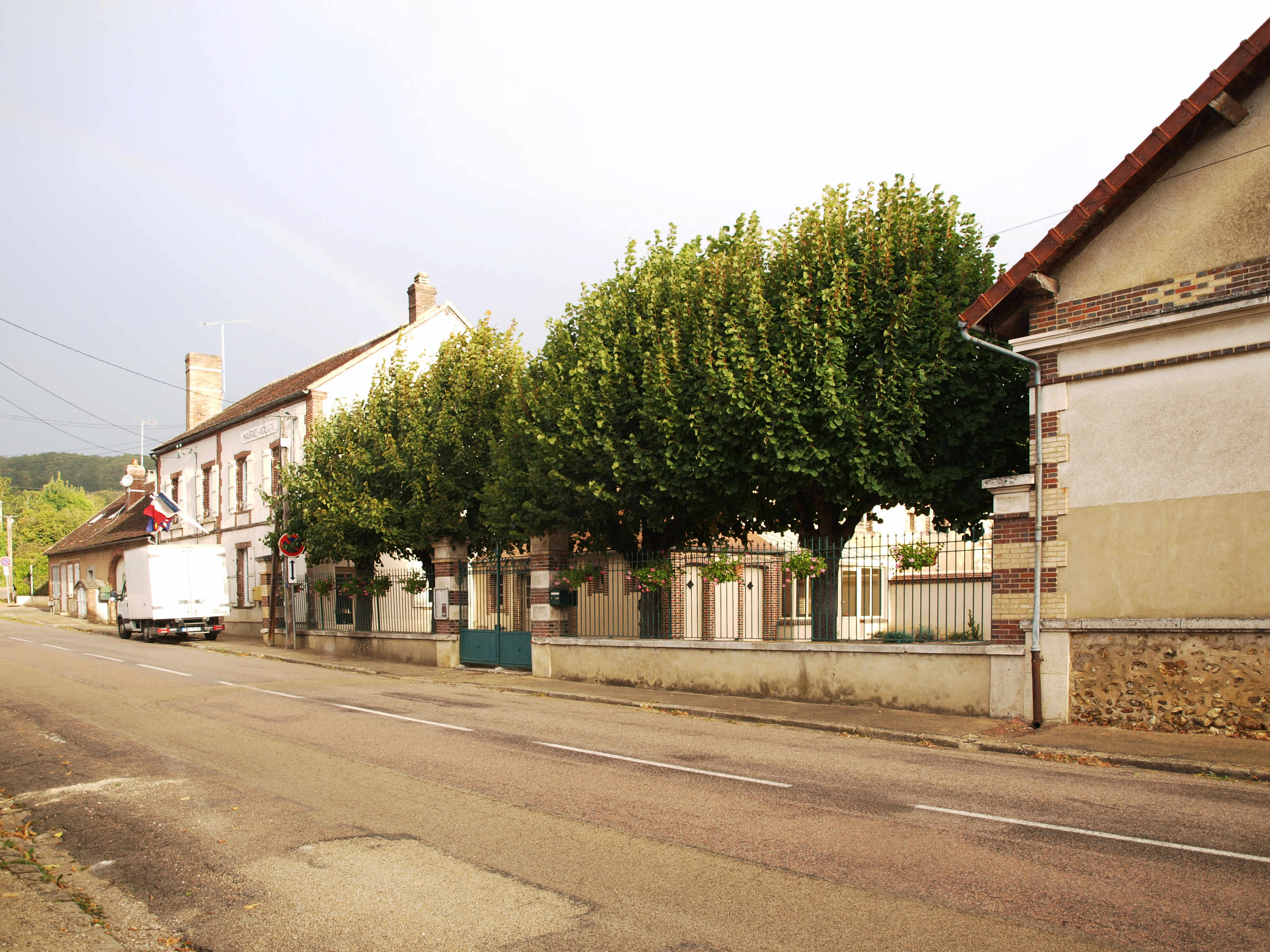
- Location of Volgré
- Location within France Location within Bourgogne-Franche-Comté
- Coordinates: 47°55′07″N 3°19′41″E
- Country: France
- Region: Bourgogne-Franche-Comté
- Department: Yonne
- Arrondissement: Auxerre
- Canton: Charny Orée de Puisaye
- Commune: Montholon
- Area^{1}: 9.55 km^{2} (3.69 sq mi)
- Highest elevation: 232 m (761 ft)
- Lowest elevation: 113 m (371 ft)
- Population (2021): 304
  - Density: 31.8/km^{2} (82.4/sq mi)
- Time zone: UTC+01:00 (CET)
  - Summer (DST): UTC+02:00 (CEST)
- Postal code: 89710
- ^{1} French Land Register data, which excludes lakes, ponds, glaciers > 1 km^{2} (0.386 sq mi or 247 acres) and river estuaries.

Volgré (French pronunciation: [vɔlɡʁe]) is a former commune in the Yonne department in Bourgogne-Franche-Comté in north-central France. On 1 January 2017, it was merged into the new commune Montholon.

== Population ==
Historical population
Year	Pop.	±% p.a.
2006	320	—
2011	337	+1.04%
2021	304	−1.03%
Source: INSEE

== See also ==
- Communes of the Yonne department
