= Montholon =

- Commune
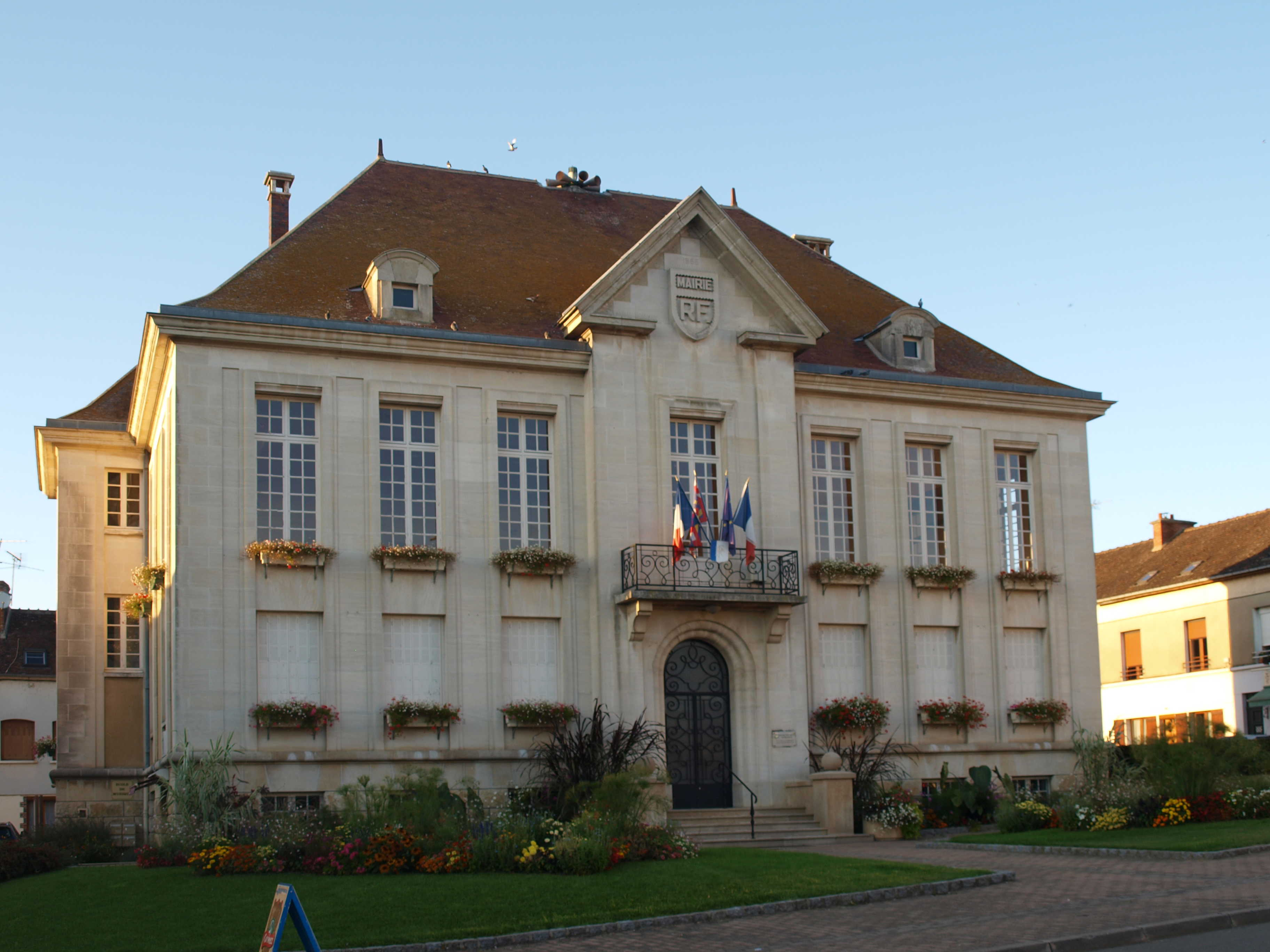
- The town hall in Aillant-sur-Tholon
- Location of Montholon
- Location within France Location within Bourgogne-Franche-Comté
- Coordinates: 47°52′34″N 3°21′07″E
- Country: France
- Region: Bourgogne-Franche-Comté
- Department: Yonne
- Arrondissement: Auxerre
- Canton: Charny Orée de Puisaye
- Intercommunality: Aillantais

Government
  - Mayor (2022–2026): Fernando Dias Goncalves
- Area^{1}: 50.08 km^{2} (19.34 sq mi)
- Population (2023): 2,709
  - Density: 54.09/km^{2} (140.1/sq mi)
- Time zone: UTC+01:00 (CET)
  - Summer (DST): UTC+02:00 (CEST)
- INSEE/Postal code: 89003 /89110, 89710
- ^{1} French Land Register data, which excludes lakes, ponds, glaciers > 1 km^{2} (0.386 sq mi or 247 acres) and river estuaries.

Montholon (French pronunciation: [mɔ̃tɔlɔ̃]) is a commune in the department of Yonne, central France. The municipality was established on 1 January 2017 by the merger of the former communes of Aillant-sur-Tholon (the seat), Champvallon, Villiers-sur-Tholon and Volgré.

== Population ==
Population data refer to the commune in its geography as of January 2025.

Historical population
Year	Pop.	±% p.a.
1968	2,033	—
1975	2,221	+1.27%
1982	2,389	+1.05%
1990	2,542	+0.78%
1999	2,608	+0.29%
2007	2,788	+0.84%
2012	2,887	+0.70%
2017	2,866	−0.15%
2023	2,709	−0.93%
Source: INSEE

== Climate ==
Climate data for Aillant-sur-Tholon (1991–2020 normals, extremes 1982-present)
Month	Jan	Feb	Mar	Apr	May	Jun	Jul	Aug	Sep	Oct	Nov	Dec	Year
Record high °C (°F)	16.7 (62.1)	22.1 (71.8)	26.1 (79.0)	30.4 (86.7)	33.7 (92.7)	40.3 (104.5)	42.7 (108.9)	42.2 (108.0)	36.3 (97.3)	31.5 (88.7)	24.0 (75.2)	18.5 (65.3)	42.7 (108.9)
Mean daily maximum °C (°F)	7.1 (44.8)	8.8 (47.8)	13.2 (55.8)	17.0 (62.6)	21.0 (69.8)	24.8 (76.6)	27.5 (81.5)	27.3 (81.1)	22.7 (72.9)	17.3 (63.1)	11.1 (52.0)	7.6 (45.7)	17.1 (62.8)
Daily mean °C (°F)	3.7 (38.7)	4.4 (39.9)	7.5 (45.5)	10.4 (50.7)	14.2 (57.6)	17.9 (64.2)	20.1 (68.2)	19.9 (67.8)	15.9 (60.6)	12.0 (53.6)	7.1 (44.8)	4.3 (39.7)	11.5 (52.7)
Mean daily minimum °C (°F)	0.3 (32.5)	0.0 (32.0)	1.7 (35.1)	3.7 (38.7)	7.5 (45.5)	10.9 (51.6)	12.8 (55.0)	12.5 (54.5)	9.0 (48.2)	6.7 (44.1)	3.2 (37.8)	1.0 (33.8)	5.8 (42.4)
Record low °C (°F)	−21.5 (−6.7)	−23.5 (−10.3)	−14.4 (6.1)	−8.1 (17.4)	−2.0 (28.4)	0.1 (32.2)	3.2 (37.8)	2.5 (36.5)	−1.0 (30.2)	−8.0 (17.6)	−12.0 (10.4)	−17.5 (0.5)	−23.5 (−10.3)
Average precipitation mm (inches)	62.5 (2.46)	55.0 (2.17)	54.0 (2.13)	56.9 (2.24)	67.0 (2.64)	54.8 (2.16)	54.8 (2.16)	56.6 (2.23)	57.7 (2.27)	69.5 (2.74)	67.8 (2.67)	70.8 (2.79)	727.4 (28.64)
Average precipitation days (≥ 1.0 mm)	11.8	10.7	10.3	10.0	10.3	8.5	8.0	7.5	8.5	10.4	10.8	12.5	119.2
Source: Meteociel

== See also ==
- Communes of the Yonne department
