= Sépeaux-Saint-Romain =

- Commune
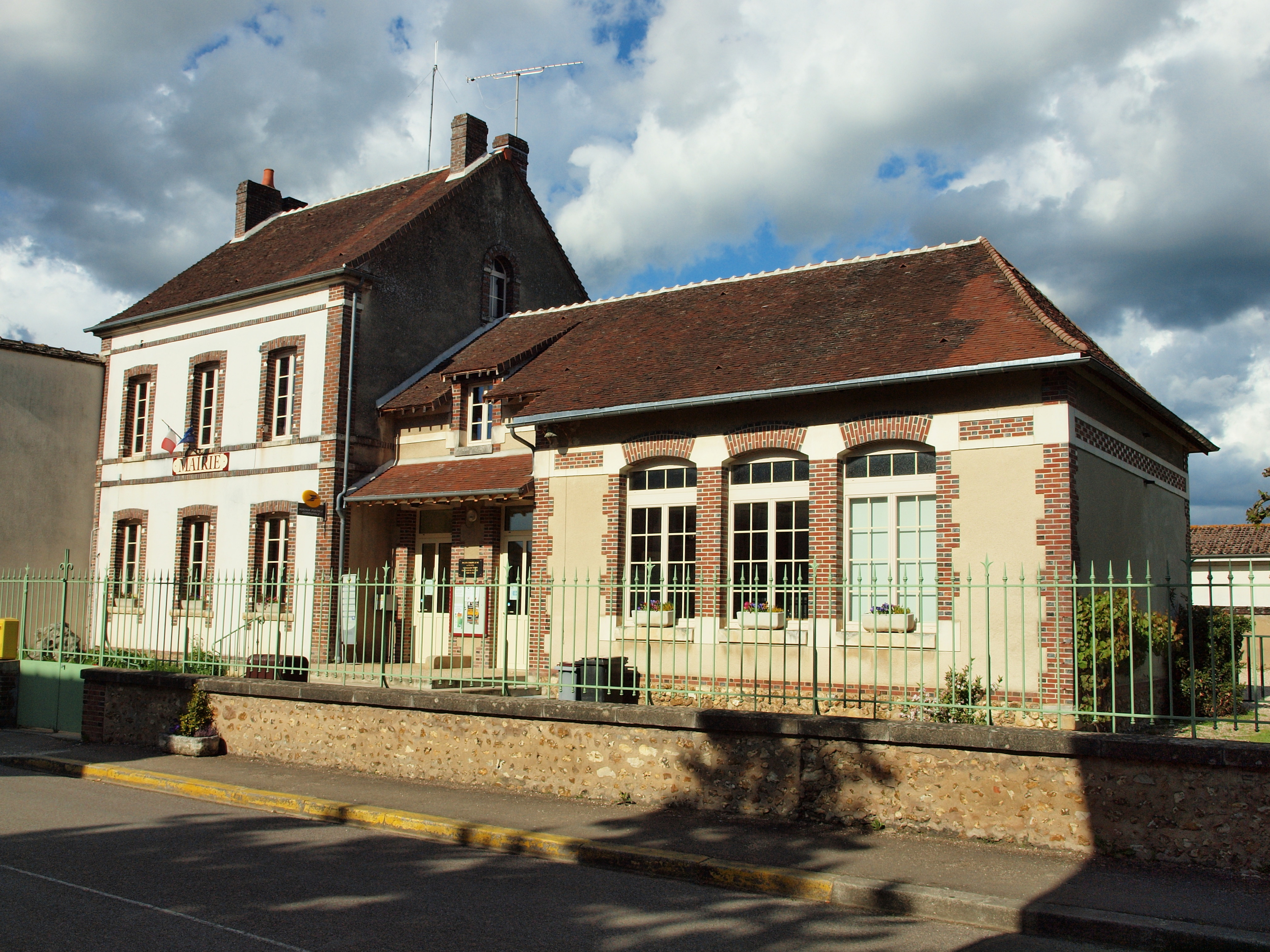
- The town hall in Sépeaux-Saint-Romain
- Location of Sépeaux-Saint-Romain
- Location within France Location within Bourgogne-Franche-Comté
- Coordinates: 47°56′35″N 3°14′10″E
- Country: France
- Region: Bourgogne-Franche-Comté
- Department: Yonne
- Arrondissement: Sens
- Canton: Charny Orée de Puisaye
- Area^{1}: 30.27 km^{2} (11.69 sq mi)
- Population (2023): 506
  - Density: 16.7/km^{2} (43.3/sq mi)
- Time zone: UTC+01:00 (CET)
  - Summer (DST): UTC+02:00 (CEST)
- INSEE/Postal code: 89388 /89116
- ^{1} French Land Register data, which excludes lakes, ponds, glaciers > 1 km^{2} (0.386 sq mi or 247 acres) and river estuaries.

Sépeaux-Saint-Romain (French pronunciation: [sepo sɛ̃ ʁɔmɛ̃]) is a commune in the Yonne department of central France. The municipality was established on 1 January 2016 by merger of the former communes of Sépeaux and Saint-Romain-le-Preux.

== See also ==
- Communes of the Yonne department
