= Saint-Maurice-le-Vieil =

- Commune
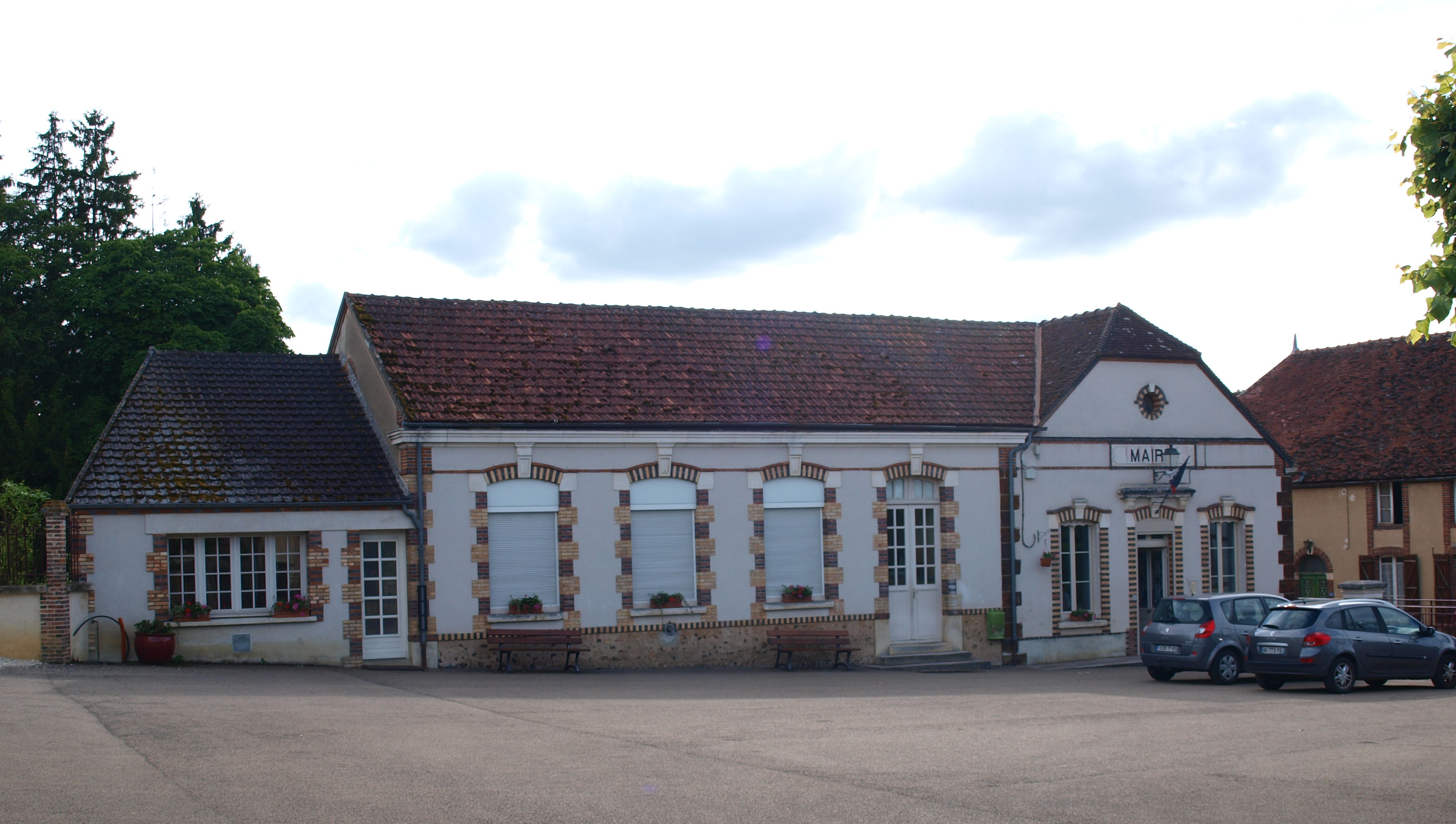
- The town hall in Saint-Maurice-le-Vieil
- Location of Saint-Maurice-le-Vieil
- Location within France Location within Bourgogne-Franche-Comté
- Coordinates: 47°49′26″N 3°21′06″E
- Country: France
- Region: Bourgogne-Franche-Comté
- Department: Yonne
- Arrondissement: Auxerre
- Canton: Charny Orée de Puisaye

Government
  - Mayor (2020–2026): Patrick Rigolet
- Area^{1}: 4.93 km^{2} (1.90 sq mi)
- Highest elevation: 210 m (690 ft)
- Lowest elevation: 123 m (404 ft)
- Population (2023): 370
  - Density: 75/km^{2} (190/sq mi)
- Time zone: UTC+01:00 (CET)
  - Summer (DST): UTC+02:00 (CEST)
- INSEE/Postal code: 89360 /89110
- ^{1} French Land Register data, which excludes lakes, ponds, glaciers > 1 km^{2} (0.386 sq mi or 247 acres) and river estuaries.

Saint-Maurice-le-Vieil (French pronunciation: [sɛ̃ mɔʁis lə vjɛj]; literally "Saint-Maurice the Old") is a commune in the Yonne department in Bourgogne-Franche-Comté in north-central France.

== See also ==
- Communes of the Yonne department
