= Merry-la-Vallée =

- Commune
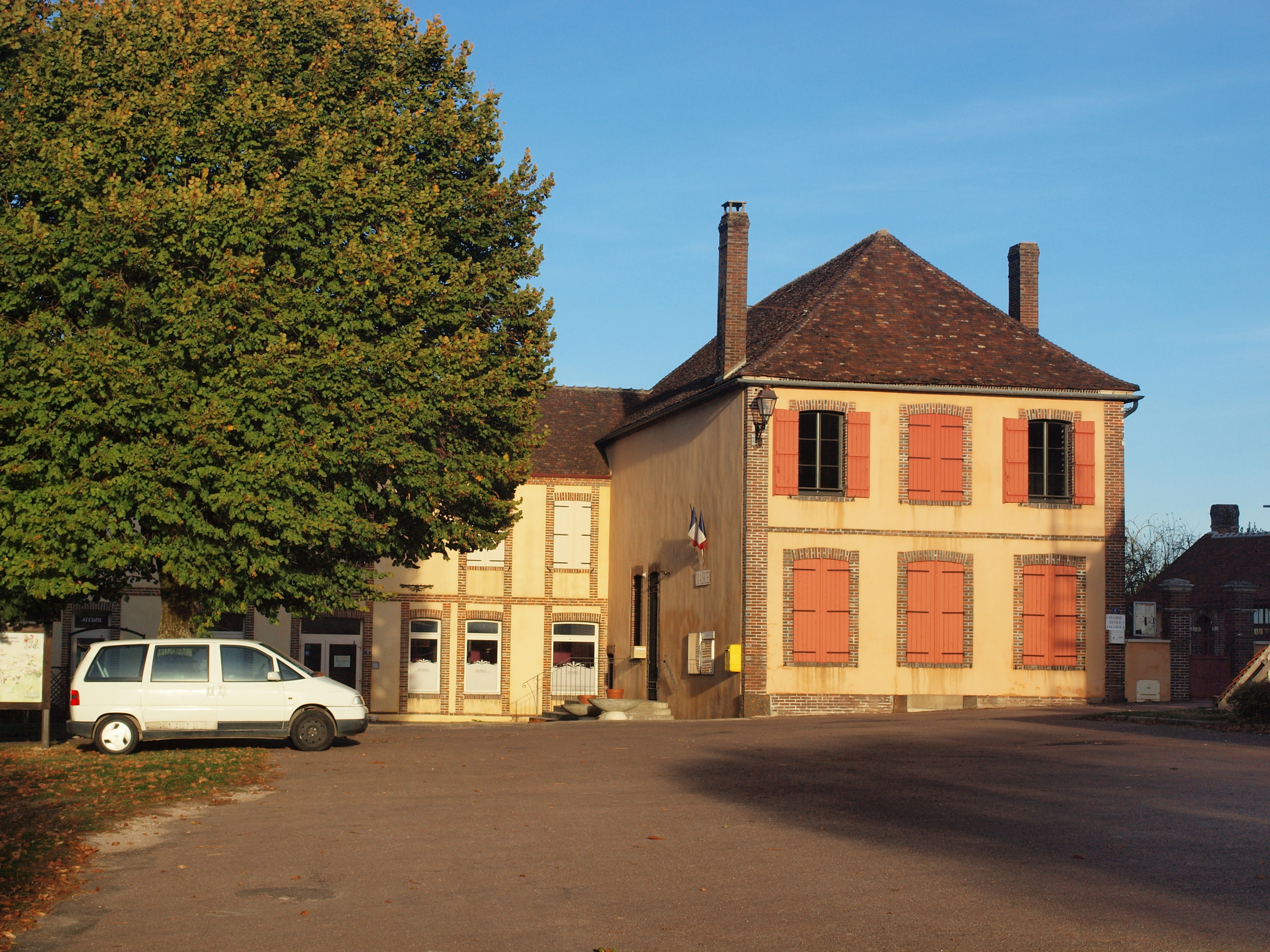
- The town hall in Merry-la-Vallée
- Location of Merry-la-Vallée
- Location within France Location within Bourgogne-Franche-Comté
- Coordinates: 47°48′39″N 3°20′01″E
- Country: France
- Region: Bourgogne-Franche-Comté
- Department: Yonne
- Arrondissement: Auxerre
- Canton: Charny Orée de Puisaye

Government
  - Mayor (2020–2026): Jean-Luc Prevost
- Area^{1}: 18.31 km^{2} (7.07 sq mi)
- Highest elevation: 292 m (958 ft)
- Lowest elevation: 160 m (520 ft)
- Population (2023): 358
  - Density: 19.6/km^{2} (50.6/sq mi)
- Time zone: UTC+01:00 (CET)
  - Summer (DST): UTC+02:00 (CEST)
- INSEE/Postal code: 89251 /89110
- ^{1} French Land Register data, which excludes lakes, ponds, glaciers > 1 km^{2} (0.386 sq mi or 247 acres) and river estuaries.

Merry-la-Vallée (French pronunciation: [mɛʁi la vale]) is a commune in the Yonne department in Bourgogne-Franche-Comté in north-central France.

== See also ==
- Communes of the Yonne department
