= Robert Falcucci =

French painter (1900–1989)

Robert Falcucci (10 April 1900 – 13 May 1989) was a French illustrator. He was born in Châteauroux, France of Joseph, from the village of Verdesis in Castagniccia (Corsica) and Solange Fabulet, from Berry. He died at his home in Saint-Aubin.

== Personal ==
In 1903 his father, a postmaster, was appointed to Saint-Aubin-Châteauneuf (Yonne, Burgundy). He transferred in 1911 to Héry (Yonne, Burgundy) to facilitate transportation to Auxerre where the young Robert was educated at Lycée Paul Bert. He was introduced to drawing and painting by Cecile Cavaille-Coll (1854–1944), granddaughter of the famous organ builder, Aristide Cavaillé-Coll (1811–1899), painter and designer. In 1919 he performed military service in Paris.

Released too late from his military service, he competed at the École des Beaux-Arts. He was accepted at the Galeries des Beaux-Arts and admitted to the École Normale Supérieure des Arts Décoratifs in Paris. In Paris he met Emmanuel Cavaille-Coll (1860–1922), brother of Cecilia, renowned designer and watercolorist.

In 1924 he married Odile Ginioux with whom he had seven children.

== Career ==
He worked for the Renault car company from 1923 to 1927, directing many magazine advertising pages, especially for Omnia and Automobilia. In 1927 he signed the color page of the magazine L'Illustration for 14 June and visited Marrakesh and the High Atlas.

He worked for couturier Paul Poiret (1879–1944) in 1928. He signed several commercials under the pseudonym "Wurci directory of luxury Pan", for industries and luxury shops. Later he worked for Poiret's ABC magazine.

In the 1930s, he illustrated the program for the Monte Carlo Rally (1931), and a poster for PLM advertising the Juan les Pins-Antibes connection (1937).

In the 1940s he participated in Workshop 4, rue Georges Berger (Paris 17th) (1943), illustrated the work of R. Hervouin Guynemer legendary hero (1944) and the works of P. Riber, The weighted and Open arrow (1945) and the Colomba editions of Mérimée Barry (1946). In 1948 he worked as Painter of the Army.

In the 1950s he decorated the first Caravelle (1957) and A Gallery Cathedral for the Royal Rue Royale. (1958)

In the 1960s he designed decorations for the Boeing 707: Maintenon, Compiègne. He visited Algeria to serve in a company of infantry in Great Kabylie (1960). He designed the statue of monumental Sacred Heart Chapel Saint-Pierre (crypt) (1960). He designed the official program of the Cannes Film Festival (1967).

In the 1970s he moved to Saint-Aubin-Château-Neuf (Burgundy) after restoration of a former abandoned road. The lane is now "Falcucci alley" (1970).

In the 1980s he was Painter of the Army, selected to create the cover of the official program of the national holiday on 14 July (1982). He was the Painter of Light. The Basilica of St. Pius X in Lourdes (Hautes-Pyrénées) is decorated with a set of gémmaux made from his models (1985).
