= Sépeaux =

Commune in Yonne, France

- Part of Sépeaux-Saint-Romain
- Location of Sépeaux
- Location within France Location within Bourgogne-Franche-Comté
- Coordinates: 47°56′36″N 3°14′10″E
- Country: France
- Region: Bourgogne-Franche-Comté
- Department: Yonne
- Arrondissement: Sens
- Canton: Charny Orée de Puisaye
- Commune: Sépeaux-Saint-Romain
- Area^{1}: 19.91 km^{2} (7.69 sq mi)
- Highest elevation: 203 m (666 ft)
- Lowest elevation: 108 m (354 ft)
- Population (2019): 354
  - Density: 17.8/km^{2} (46.1/sq mi)
- Time zone: UTC+01:00 (CET)
  - Summer (DST): UTC+02:00 (CEST)
- Postal code: 89116
- ^{1} French Land Register data, which excludes lakes, ponds, glaciers > 1 km^{2} (0.386 sq mi or 247 acres) and river estuaries.

Sépeaux (French pronunciation: [sepo]) is a former commune in the Yonne department in Bourgogne-Franche-Comté in north-central France. On 1 January 2016, it was merged into the new commune of Sépeaux-Saint-Romain.

== See also ==
- Communes of the Yonne department
- Jacques-René Tenon
