= Paroy-sur-Tholon =

- Commune
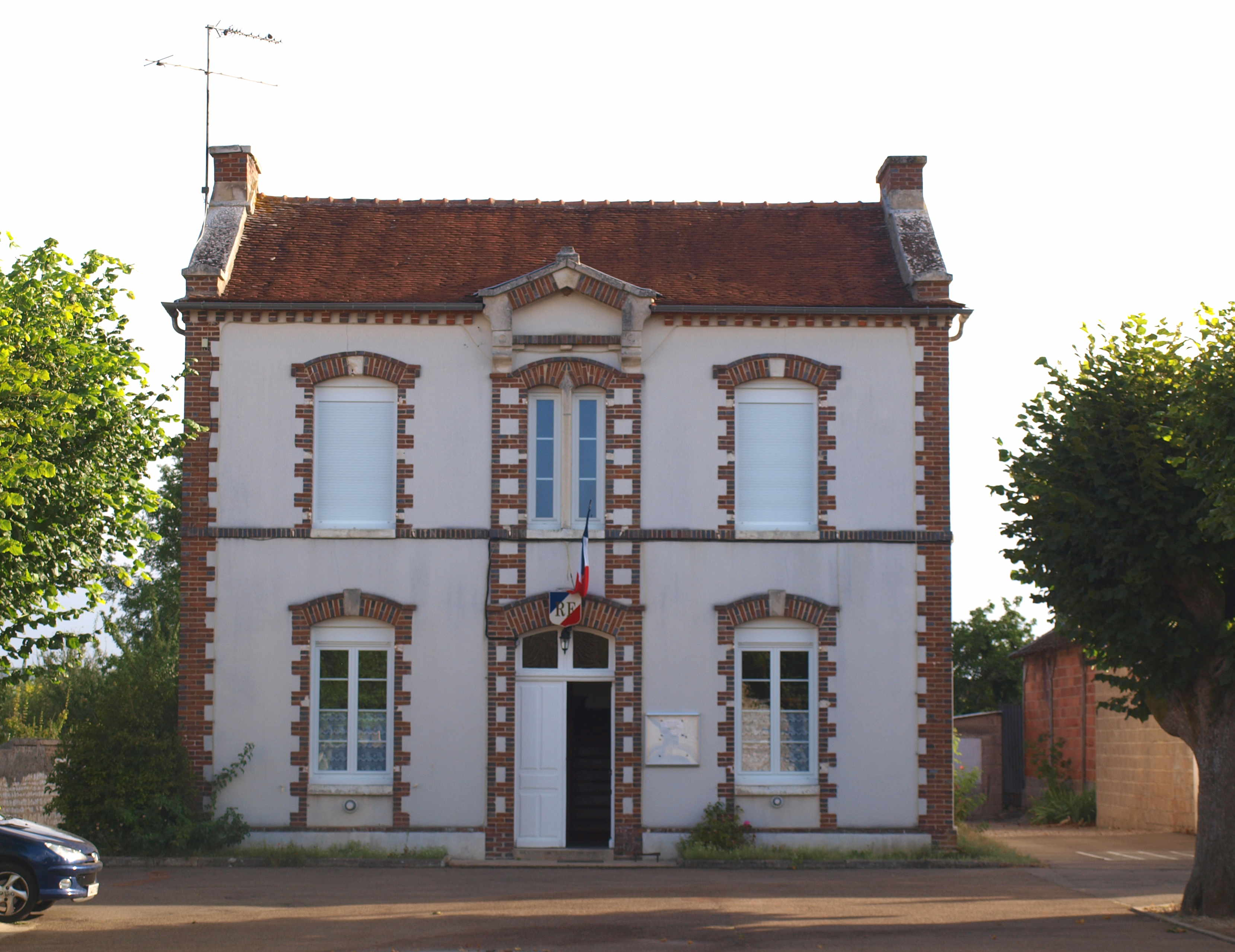
- The town hall in Paroy-sur-Tholon
- Location of Paroy-sur-Tholon
- Location within France Location within Bourgogne-Franche-Comté
- Coordinates: 47°57′20″N 3°22′25″E
- Country: France
- Region: Bourgogne-Franche-Comté
- Department: Yonne
- Arrondissement: Sens
- Canton: Charny Orée de Puisaye

Government
  - Mayor (2020–2026): Éric Gallois
- Area^{1}: 4.21 km^{2} (1.63 sq mi)
- Highest elevation: 205 m (673 ft)
- Lowest elevation: 78 m (256 ft)
- Population (2023): 306
  - Density: 72.7/km^{2} (188/sq mi)
- Time zone: UTC+01:00 (CET)
  - Summer (DST): UTC+02:00 (CEST)
- INSEE/Postal code: 89289 /89300
- ^{1} French Land Register data, which excludes lakes, ponds, glaciers > 1 km^{2} (0.386 sq mi or 247 acres) and river estuaries.

Paroy-sur-Tholon (French pronunciation: [paʁwa syʁ tɔlɔ̃]) is a commune in the Yonne department in Bourgogne-Franche-Comté in north-central France.

== See also ==
- Communes of the Yonne department
