= Ferdinand Pouy =

French writer (1824–1891)

- Born: 17 February 1824; Villiers-sur-Tholon, France
- Died: 21 November 1891 (aged 67); Amiens, France
- Occupation: Writer

Louis Eugène Ferdinand Pouy (17 February 1824 – 21 November 1891) was a 19th-century French writer and bibliographer

After law school, he moved to Amiens and bought an auctioneer charge. He spent part of his free time in historical and bibliographic research. He became known through the publication of unpublished or little known documents and was engaged by the Ministry of Education as a correspondent. He left many books from research.

== Publications ==
- 1861: Recherches historiques sur l'imprimerie et la librairie à Amiens avec une description de livres divers imprimés dans cette ville
- 1863–1864: Recherches historiques et bibliographiques sur l'imprimerie : et la librairie et sur les arts et industries qui s'y rattachent dans le département de la Somme
- 1864: Rosières en Santerre
- 1865: Notice sur l'ancienne chapelle du Saint-Sépulcre de Saint-Firmin-le-Confesseur d'Amiens, et sur diverses fondations curieuses de Simon Le Bourguignon au XVe siècle
- 1866: Démophile Dourneau : poëte à Roye en 1793
- 1869: Iconographie des thèses : notice sur les thèses dites historiées soutenues ou gravées notamment par des Picards
- 1869: Les Bibliographes picards
- 1872: Histoire des cocardes blanches, noires, vertes et tricolores
- 1872: Les faïences d'origine picarde et les collections diverses
- 1873: Parodies, railleries et caricatures des anciennes thèses historiées, pour faire suite à l'iconographie des thèses
- 1874: Recherches sur les almanachs & calendriers artistiques, à estampes, à vignettes, à caricatures, etc ... principalement du XVIe au XIXe siècle
- 1874: Anecdotes historiques sur Deschamps de Charmelieu, marquis de Saint-Bris, receveur des tailles à Auxerre, 1763-1784
- 1876: Histoire de François Faure, évêque d'Amiens, prédicateur de la reine Anne d'Autriche et des cours de Louis XIII et de Louis XIV, conseiller d'État, etc. d'après divers documents inédits (1612-1687)
- 1876: Les Anglais à Amiens pendant la Révolution : Le colonel Keating, 1792-94 avec notes historiques sur les évènements du temps
- 1879: Nouvelles Recherches sur les almanachs et calendriers à partir du XVIe siècle
- 1882: La chambre du conseil des Etats de Picardie pendant la Ligue
- 1885: Concini, maréchal d'Ancre, son gouvernement en Picardie : 1611-1617
- 1889: Les pèlerinages en Picardie du XIVe au XVIe siècle
- 1890: Mémoire du Baron Hogguer, financier-diplomate, concernant la France et la Suède, 1700 à 1767, publié, avec des notes et documents inédits relatifs aux relations du baron avec la célèbre actrice Desmares

== Sources ==
- Obituary in revue Encyclopédique Larousse 1892 (pages 19-20)
