= Valravillon =

- Commune
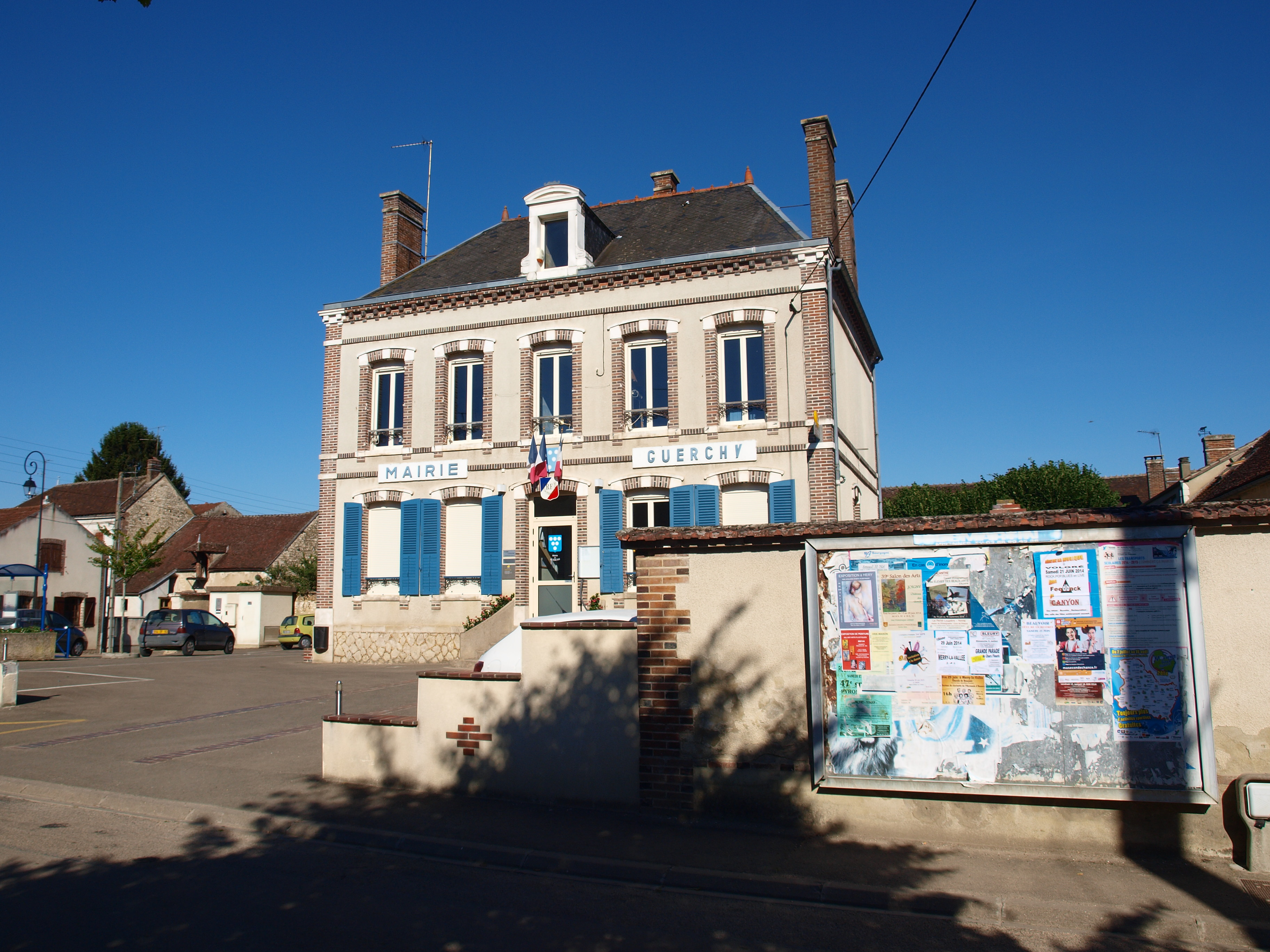
- The town hall in Guerchy
- Location of Valravillon
- Location within France Location within Bourgogne-Franche-Comté
- Coordinates: 47°53′31″N 3°26′20″E
- Country: France
- Region: Bourgogne-Franche-Comté
- Department: Yonne
- Arrondissement: Auxerre
- Canton: Charny Orée de Puisaye

Government
  - Mayor (2020–2026): Mahfoud Aomar
- Area^{1}: 37.05 km^{2} (14.31 sq mi)
- Population (2023): 1,779
  - Density: 48.02/km^{2} (124.4/sq mi)
- Time zone: UTC+01:00 (CET)
  - Summer (DST): UTC+02:00 (CEST)
- INSEE/Postal code: 89196 /89113, 89110
- ^{1} French Land Register data, which excludes lakes, ponds, glaciers > 1 km^{2} (0.386 sq mi or 247 acres) and river estuaries.

Valravillon (French pronunciation: [valʁavijɔ̃]) is a commune in the Yonne department of central France. The municipality was established on 1 January 2016 by merger of the former communes of Guerchy, Laduz, Neuilly and Villemer.

== See also ==
- Communes of the Yonne department
