= Fleury-la-Vallée =

- Commune
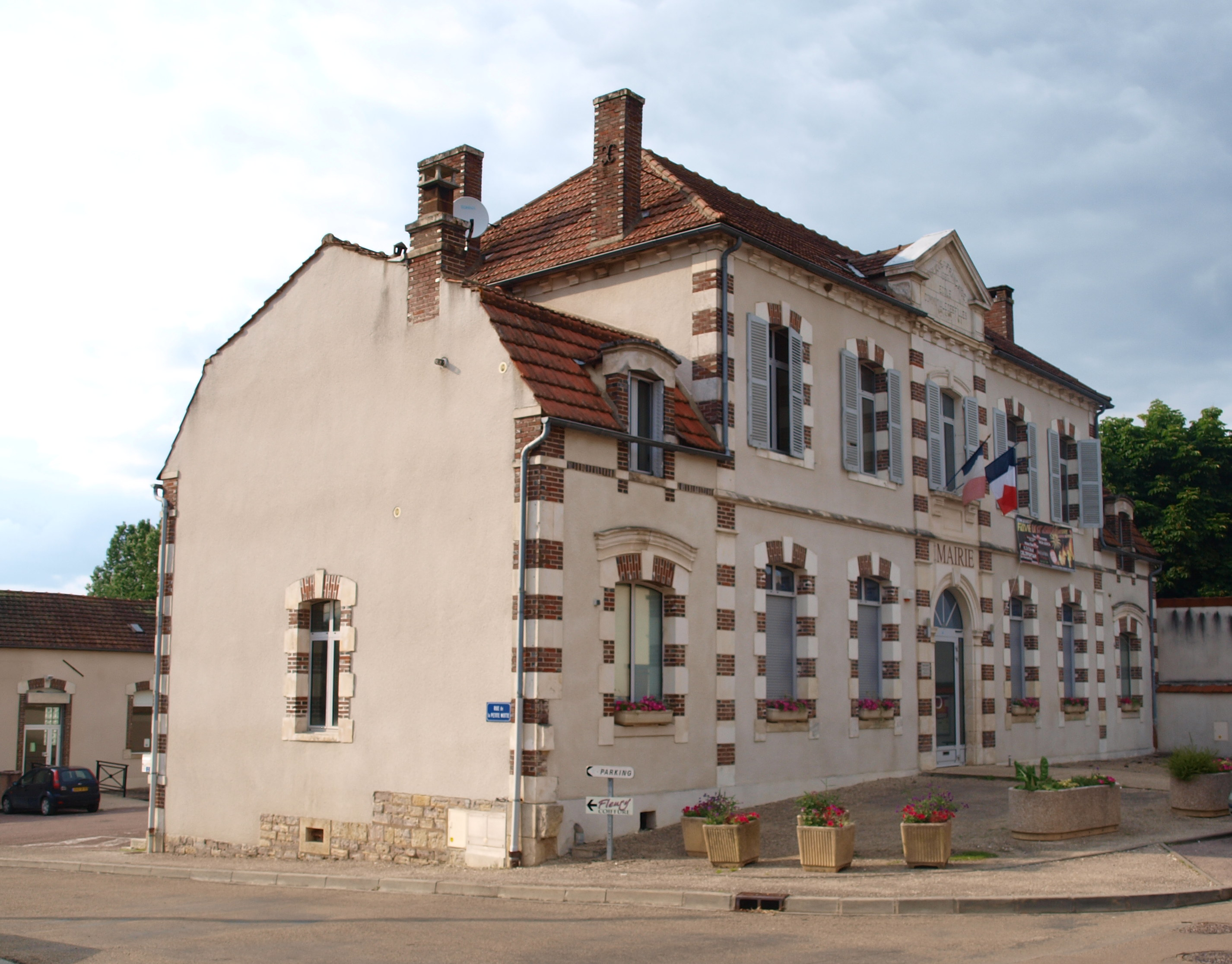
- The town hall in Fleury-la-Vallée

- Coat of arms
- Location of Fleury-la-Vallée
- Location within France Location within Bourgogne-Franche-Comté
- Coordinates: 47°52′05″N 3°27′00″E
- Country: France
- Region: Bourgogne-Franche-Comté
- Department: Yonne
- Arrondissement: Auxerre
- Canton: Charny Orée de Puisaye

Government
  - Mayor (2020–2026): Françoise Cancela-Landsheère
- Area^{1}: 15.06 km^{2} (5.81 sq mi)
- Highest elevation: 226 m (741 ft)
- Lowest elevation: 102 m (335 ft)
- Population (2023): 1,007
  - Density: 66.87/km^{2} (173.2/sq mi)
- Time zone: UTC+01:00 (CET)
  - Summer (DST): UTC+02:00 (CEST)
- INSEE/Postal code: 89167 /89113
- ^{1} French Land Register data, which excludes lakes, ponds, glaciers > 1 km^{2} (0.386 sq mi or 247 acres) and river estuaries.

Fleury-la-Vallée (French pronunciation: [flœʁi la vale]) is a commune in the Yonne department in Bourgogne-Franche-Comté in north-central France.

== See also ==
- Communes of the Yonne department
