= Poilly-sur-Tholon =

- Commune
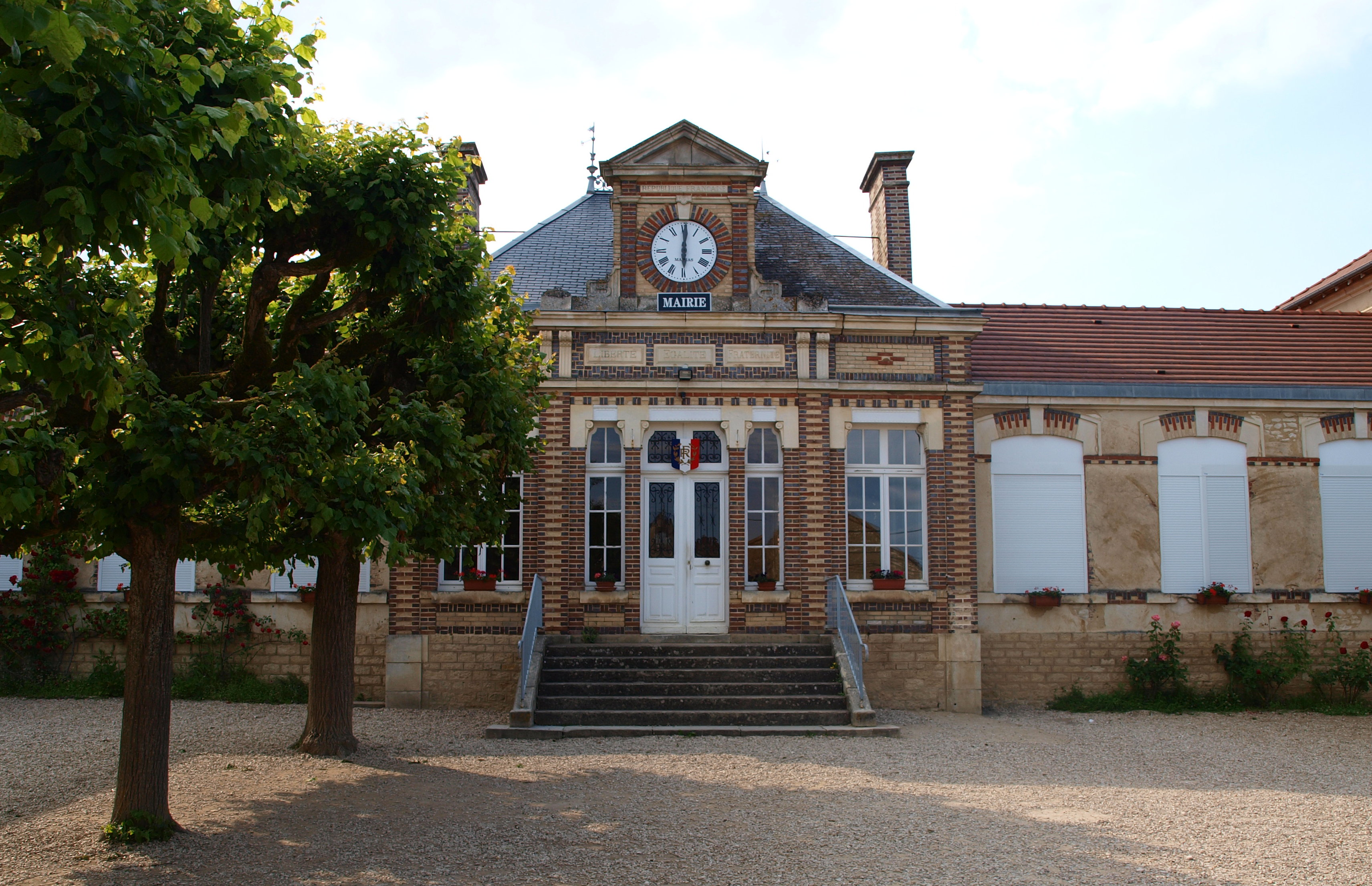
- The town hall in Poilly-sur-Tholon
- Location of Poilly-sur-Tholon
- Location within France Location within Bourgogne-Franche-Comté
- Coordinates: 47°52′03″N 3°23′44″E
- Country: France
- Region: Bourgogne-Franche-Comté
- Department: Yonne
- Arrondissement: Auxerre
- Canton: Charny Orée de Puisaye

Government
  - Mayor (2020–2026): Alain Chevallier
- Area^{1}: 19.56 km^{2} (7.55 sq mi)
- Highest elevation: 210 m (690 ft)
- Lowest elevation: 112 m (367 ft)
- Population (2023): 666
  - Density: 34.0/km^{2} (88.2/sq mi)
- Time zone: UTC+01:00 (CET)
  - Summer (DST): UTC+02:00 (CEST)
- INSEE/Postal code: 89304 /89110
- ^{1} French Land Register data, which excludes lakes, ponds, glaciers > 1 km^{2} (0.386 sq mi or 247 acres) and river estuaries.

Poilly-sur-Tholon (French pronunciation: [pwaji syʁ tɔlɔ̃]) is a commune in Yonne, a department in Bourgogne-Franche-Comté in north-central France.

== See also ==
- Communes of the Yonne department
