= Senan, Yonne =

Senan
- Commune
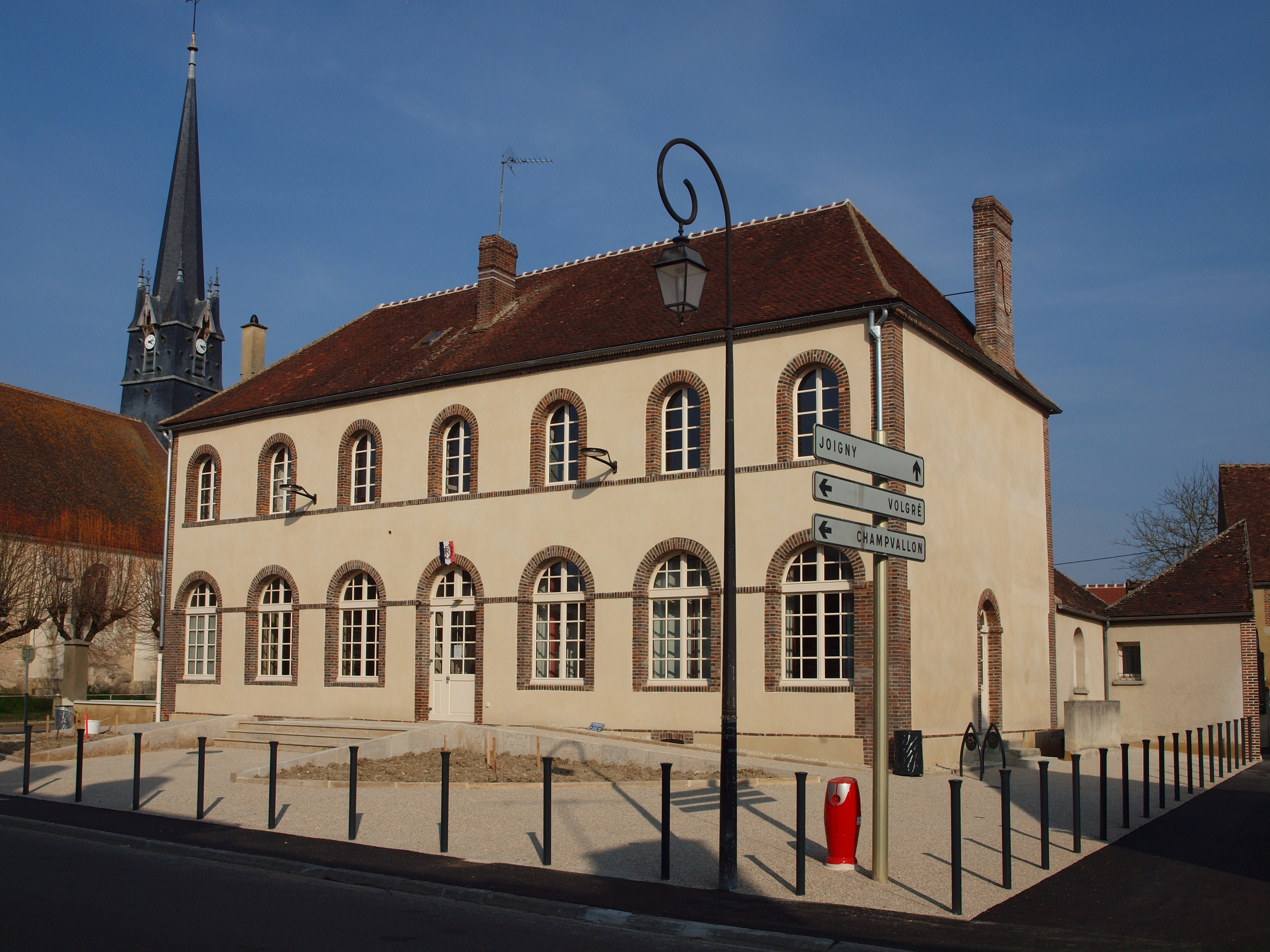
- The town hall in Senan

- Coat of arms
- Location of Senan
- Location within France Location within Bourgogne-Franche-Comté
- Coordinates: 47°54′50″N 3°21′36″E
- Country: France
- Region: Bourgogne-Franche-Comté
- Department: Yonne
- Arrondissement: Auxerre
- Canton: Charny Orée de Puisaye

Government
  - Mayor (2020–2026): Gérard Chat
- Area^{1}: 17.54 km^{2} (6.77 sq mi)
- Highest elevation: 236 m (774 ft)
- Lowest elevation: 89 m (292 ft)
- Population (2023): 672
  - Density: 38.3/km^{2} (99.2/sq mi)
- Time zone: UTC+01:00 (CET)
  - Summer (DST): UTC+02:00 (CEST)
- INSEE/Postal code: 89384 /89710
- ^{1} French Land Register data, which excludes lakes, ponds, glaciers > 1 km^{2} (0.386 sq mi or 247 acres) and river estuaries.

Senan (French pronunciation: [sənɑ̃]) is a commune in the Yonne department in Bourgogne-Franche-Comté in north-central France.

== See also ==
- Communes of the Yonne department
