= Aillant-sur-Tholon =

- Part of Montholon
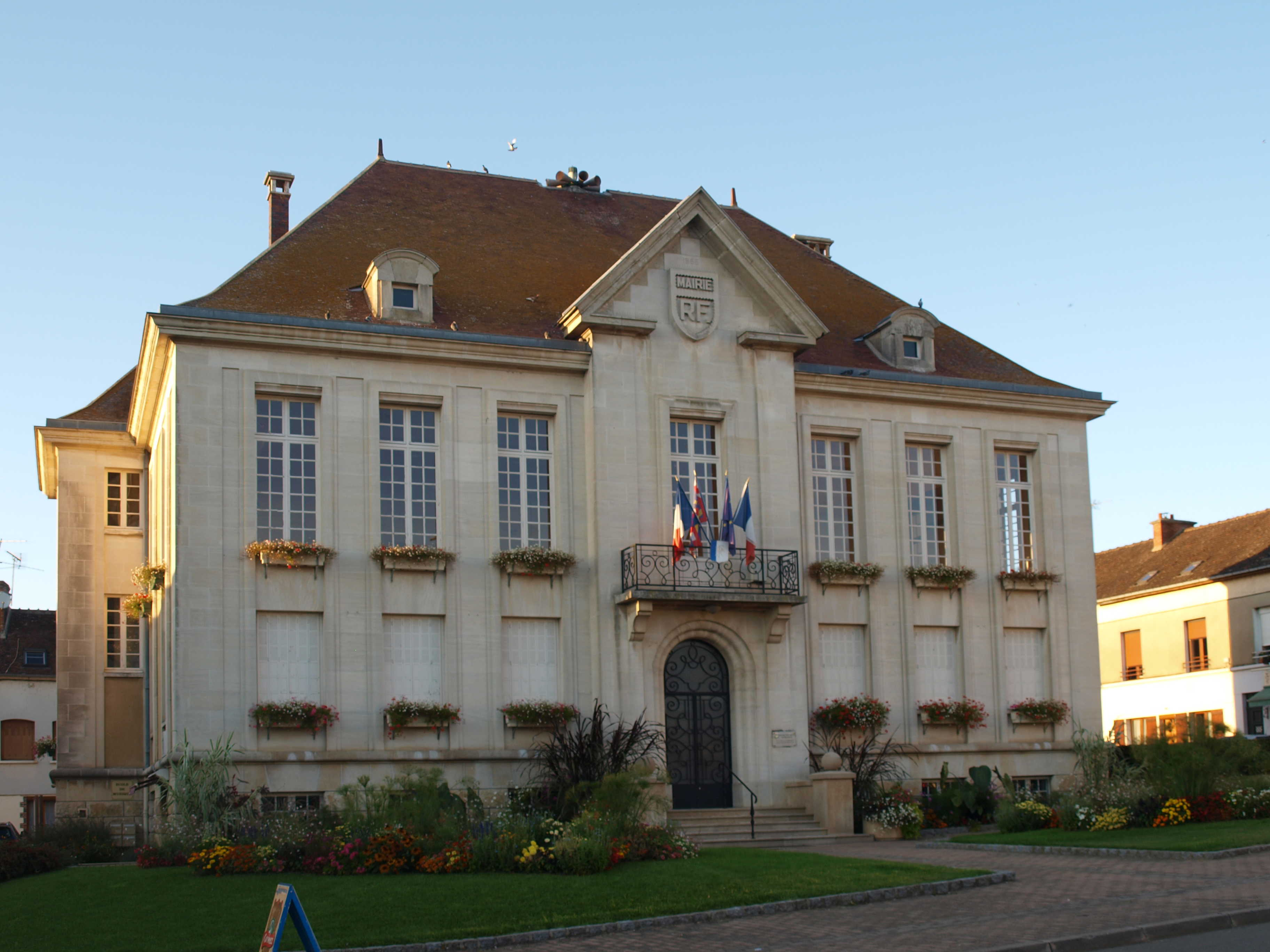
- Town hall

- Coat of arms
- Location of Aillant-sur-Tholon
- Location within France Location within Bourgogne-Franche-Comté
- Coordinates: 47°52′32″N 3°21′06″E
- Country: France
- Region: Bourgogne-Franche-Comté
- Department: Yonne
- Arrondissement: Auxerre
- Canton: Charny Orée de Puisaye
- Commune: Montholon
- Area^{1}: 18.20 km^{2} (7.03 sq mi)
- Highest elevation: 241 m (791 ft)
- Lowest elevation: 108 m (354 ft)
- Population (2021): 1,650
  - Density: 90.7/km^{2} (235/sq mi)
- Time zone: UTC+01:00 (CET)
  - Summer (DST): UTC+02:00 (CEST)
- Postal code: 89110
- ^{1} French Land Register data, which excludes lakes, ponds, glaciers > 1 km^{2} (0.386 sq mi or 247 acres) and river estuaries.

Aillant-sur-Tholon (French pronunciation: [ajɑ̃ syʁ tɔlɔ̃]) is a former commune in the Yonne department in Bourgogne-Franche-Comté in north-central France. On 1 January 2017, it was merged into the new commune Montholon. Aillant-sur-Tholon is twinned with Studley in Warwickshire.

== Population ==
Historical population
Year	Pop.	±% p.a.
2006	1,416	—
2011	1,387	−0.41%
2021	1,650	+1.75%
Source: INSEE

== See also ==
- Communes of the Yonne department
