= Jacques-René Tenon =

French surgeon (1724–1816)

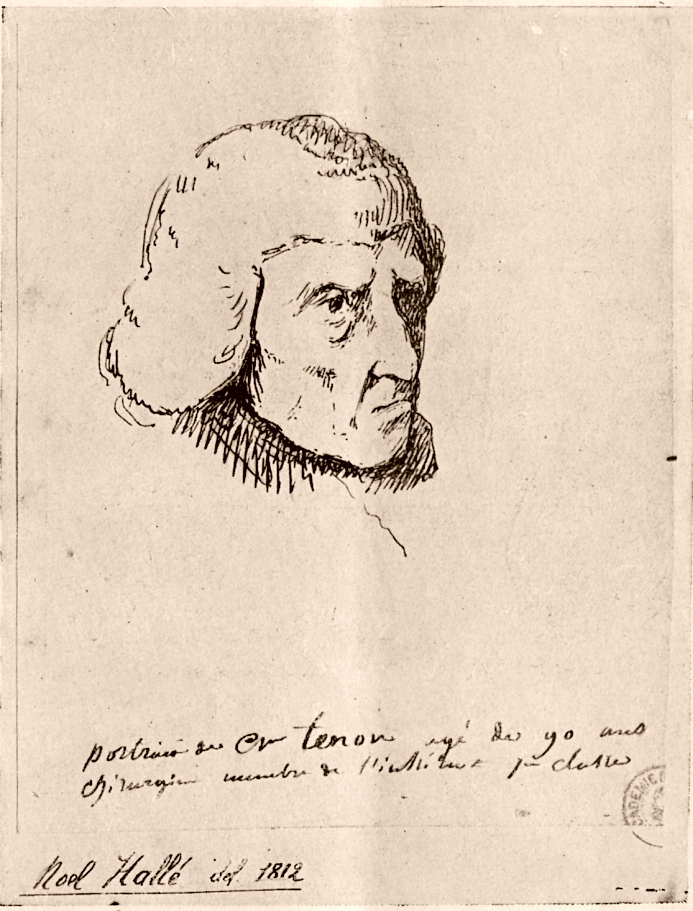
- Sketch of Jacques-René Tenon, aged ninety
- Born: 21 February 1724; Sépeaux, northern Burgundy
- Died: 16 January 1816 (aged 91); Paris
- Known for: Early modern analysis of hospital management, capsule of Tenon, Hôpital Tenon.
- Scientific career
- Fields: surgery
- Doctoral advisor: Jacques-Bénigne Winslow

Jacques-René Tenon (French pronunciation: [ʒakʁəne tənɔ̃], 21 February 1724 – 16 January 1816) was a French surgeon born in Sépeaux in northern Burgundy. He was very active in hospital reform during the second half of the 18th century. His seminal treatise on hospital design and management, the Mémoire sur les hôpitaux de Paris (Report on the Hospitals of Paris), proved to be influential in Europe for more than a century.

== Early life and education ==
Born into a family of surgeons (his 2 grandfathers and his father were surgeons), Jacques-René Tenon was the eldest of 11 children, five of whom died very young. He spent his youth in Courtenay, a town in northern France. Following the family line, he left for Paris at the age of 17 to study surgery in 1741. He was supported by a generous relative, the lawyer Nicolas Prévot.

During his studies, Tenon earned the favour of Jacques-Bénigne Winslow, a renowned doctor who taught at the Jardin du Roi, and thanks to whom he was able to deepen and use his medical knowledge. Winslow also invited him to work in his laboratory.

== Career ==
In 1745, he was appointed military surgeon during the War of Austrian Succession and took part in campaigns in Flanders, where he completed his training as a surgeon. During the campaign he contracted an almost fatal illness and was subsequently released from service.

In 1749, a few months after his return, he was admitted to the competition of principal surgeon of the hospitals of Paris. He was assigned to the Salpêtrière general hospital (a hospital-prison for women), the counterpart of Bicêtre for men. This institution was occupied by more than six thousand people, including nearly 500 hospital patients.^{:11} He cared for the women and gave lessons to his many students. During this time, he promoted the practice of inoculation for smallpox. He also launched a rigorous study of mercury poisoning among workers in the hat production industry and militated against the use of mercury in the preparation of animal skins in this industry.

In 1757, he acceded to the chair of pathology at the College of Surgery. It was in this capacity that he obtained permission and funding to build a small hospital adjoining the College of Surgery. This provided an opportunity for Tenon to explore new therapies and to refine his thinking on the administration and organization of hospitals.

In May 1759, he entered the Royal Academy of Sciences.

In 1785, the Academy of Sciences was commissioned by Louis XVI to evaluate his reconstruction plans for the Hôtel-Dieu in Paris. In response to this mandate, the Academy empanelled a special hospital committee, whose members were Tenon and other renowned scientists. This was the context in which he would, in 1788, publish his conclusions as his famous Report on the hospitals of Paris.

Elected deputy for Seine-et-Oise in the Legislative Assembly in 1791, Tenon was appointed first president of the Committee for Public Relief, and commissioned a major survey of hospitals in 1791. This study documented with some precision the number and capabilities of healthcare establishments throughout the Republic, something the Monarchy had never managed to do under the Ancien Regime. He was not re-elected under the Convention and Tenon, disapproving of its excesses, retired to his lands in Massy in 1793.

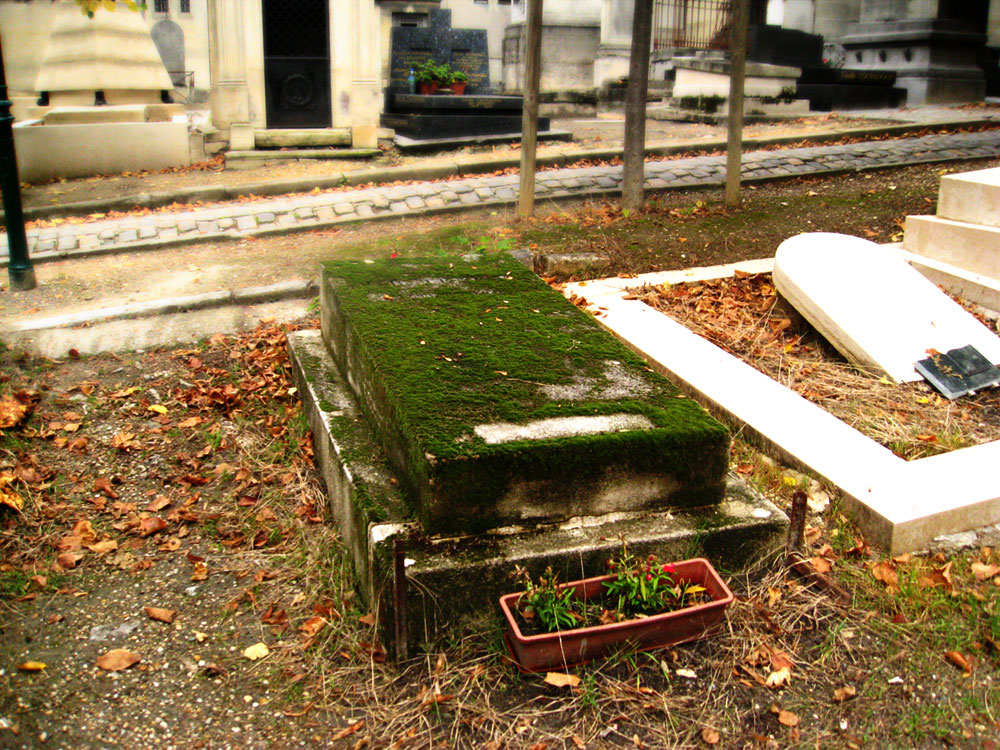
Tenon's grave in the Père-Lachaise Cemetery, in the northeast of Paris

Despite his election to the Institut de France in 1795, and despite Bonaparte’s pressing demands, he refused to renew his involvement in public life.

His house in Massy was looted and ransacked by Russian soldiers in July 1815. He then took refuge in Paris, where he died a few months later, on 16 January 1816. At his burial, Baron Percy, surgeon and Inspector General of the Armies, delivered a eulogy, saying: ‘He knew no other goal than making himself useful for others.”

He was buried in Division 10 of the Père-Lachaise cemetery.

== Tenon's Memoir on the hospitals of Paris ==
In 1788, by order of the King, Tenon published the 500-page Mémoire sur les hôpitaux de Paris (Report on the Hospitals of Paris), which provided a well documented and detailed account of Parisian hospitals. Using evidence and scientific analysis, the treatise dealt with such subjects as hygiene, patient care, management of staff, the keeping of patient records and case histories and environmental conditions.

=== Context ===
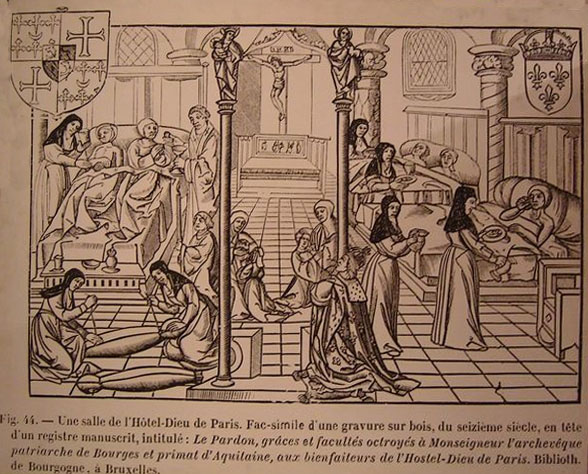
16th century etching of a hall in the Hôtel-Dieu of Paris

The development of Tenon's treatise took place in the context of public debate on what was to be done about the Hôtel-Dieu of Paris, an ancient hospital located in central Paris near Notre Dame. In the 18th century, the Hôtel-Dieu was notoriously overcrowded, unsanitary, and susceptible to fire. It was used almost exclusively by destitute patients who had no other options. It had a reputation of being a "death-trap" because of its sordid conditions and high death rate. Two serious fires had occurred in 1737 and 1772. The 1772 fire destroyed a large part of the Hôtel-Dieu and killed many patients. Public outrage at the loss of life sparked more systematic discussions of possible reforms to the hospital system in Paris.

In 1785, thirteen years after the 1772 fire, the project of the architect Bernard Poyet (1742–1824) was presented in a memoir entitled "On the need to transfer and rebuild the Hôtel-Dieu," written by Claude Coquéau (1755–1794). Poyet proposed to build a circular hospital on an island on the Seine. Its exterior was to be a replica of the Colosseum in Rome, with over 5,000 beds and an efficient system of air circulation (constant renewal of the air).

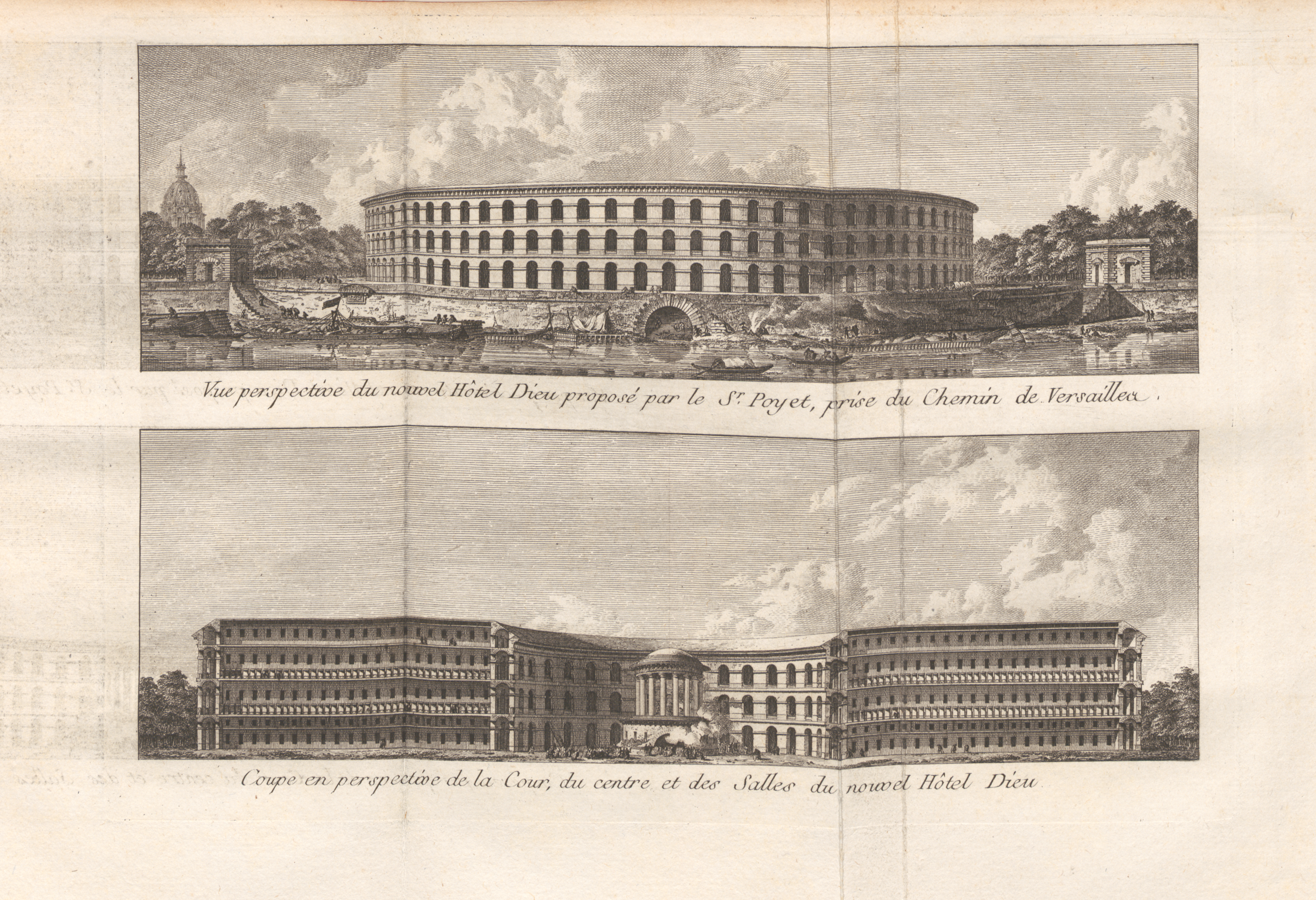
View of Poyet’s proposal for a new Hôtel-Dieu

The Baron de Breteuil (1730–1807), acting for Louis XVI, instructed the Royal Academy of Sciences to evaluate the Poyet project. For this purpose, a hospital commission of 9 members was created. Its members included Tenon and other renowned scientist such as Antoine-Laurent de Lavoisier (1743–1794), Charles-Augustin de Coulomb (1736–1806), and Pierre-Simon Laplace (1749–1827).

This commission published three consecutive reports. The 1786 report concluded that the situation of the Hôtel-Dieu was irremediable and that the hospital should be moved outside of Paris. It also rejected the Poyet project as excessive and criticized the proposed location as unhealthy. The 1787 report recommended that four smaller hospitals be established in various locations around Paris, while that of 1788 proposes that the pavilion-style of hospital be adopted, with each ward occupying a separate building to reduce disease transmission and to facilitate ventilation.

The hospital commission and the Baron de Breteuil were open to international influences as they developed ideas for improving French hospitals (notably, they commissioned the translation of an important book on Austrian hospitals). Furthermore, by order of Louis XVI, Tenon and Coulomb carried out an official study mission to England in the summer of 1787. During a stay lasting 11 weeks, Tenon visited 52 hospitals, prisons and workhouses and collected numerous statistics and detailed notes on practice. Hospitals visited included the Royal Naval Hospital, Stonehouse, a suburban hospital, built between 1758 and 1764 near Plymouth and the British Lying In Hospital as well as hospitals in such cities as Bath, Birmingham, Bristol, Exeter, Gloucester, Greenwich, Manchester, Oxford, Portsmouth and Salisbury. Their report on the voyage had a direct influence on the third report of the hospital commission.

The outbreak of the French Revolution radically altered the political and institutional landscape in which the commission's work was evolving, though it remained influential. In 1788, Tenon published his Mémoire sur les hôpitaux de Paris (Memoirs on the Hospitals of Paris), the most comprehensive work of its time on hospital organisation.

=== Coverage of Tenon's Mémoire ===
The report contains 5 chapters:^{:5–7}

1. Overview of the Hospitals of Paris.
2. Architecture, organisations and outcomes of the main hospitals in Paris.
3. Location, area and best locations.
4. Description and organization of the Hôtel-Dieu de Paris.
5. Architecture and organization that could replace the Hôtel-Dieu.

For Tenon, the hospital was the "conscience of a civilisation whose worth ... would be measured not by articles of faith and lofty doctrine, but by the way it nurtured life, succoured distress, righted injustice and transformed misery, frailty and want into hope, dignity and sufficiency." In Tenon's vision, the hospital was a secular, curative institution in which the needs of the sick and of broader society were advanced. Since "the preservation of life and maintenance of good health were indispensable to national strength, prosperity and social order ... it was the government's responsibility to manage hospitals in the public interest."^{:45}

The sick patient had a right to speedy and efficient care and efficient health care delivery dictated all aspects of hospital organisation: location, architecture, staffing, design of rooms and beds, etc. Tenon envisions a functional hospital, “a healing machine” in his own words. His hospital is a quantifiable structure that is subject to management and evaluation. The operation of this healing machine is to be based on principles such as visibility (the sick must be distributed so that they can be seen, evaluated and compared), sufficiency and convenience in terms of resting space, quantity of fresh air, distribution of patients and diseases (isolation of the contagious).^{:56–65}

Tenon lists 48 hospitals in Paris: 22 hospitals for the sick, 20 hospitals for the able-bodied poor, and 6 hospitals for the poor (sick or able-bodied). He also notes the existence of a hospital reserved for Protestants. In his description of the Hôtel-Dieu, Tenon paints a pitiless tableau. Virtually everything is criticized: the space, the circulation, the arrangement of the beds, the number and the mixing of the sick, the dirtiness, the rot and the bad smells, inhumanity and mortality. He notes that one in 15 mothers dies at the Hôtel-Dieu's maternity ward, compared to one in 128 in Manchester.^{:62–63}

Tenon rejects any idea of simply rebuilding the old Hôtel-Dieu. Instead, he proposed a comprehensive plan for the hospital development in Paris. His project would have split the Hôtel-Dieu into four smaller hospitals reserved for the sick, according to illnesses and needs: maternity, insanity, contagious diseases and “fetid” diseases. Tenon envisaged a hospital made up of small internal units, structured and sized according to the nature of the illnesses, with medical care provided in small, stand-alone pavilions.^{8–9} He summed up his ideal for medical care in the motto: "service, salubrity, tranquility, safety."

He also proposes the centralisation of the administrative functions of the various hospitals. A “common house” would be in charge of food and pharmaceutical management as well as the distribution of the material means and transport.^{8–9}

== Reception and posterity ==
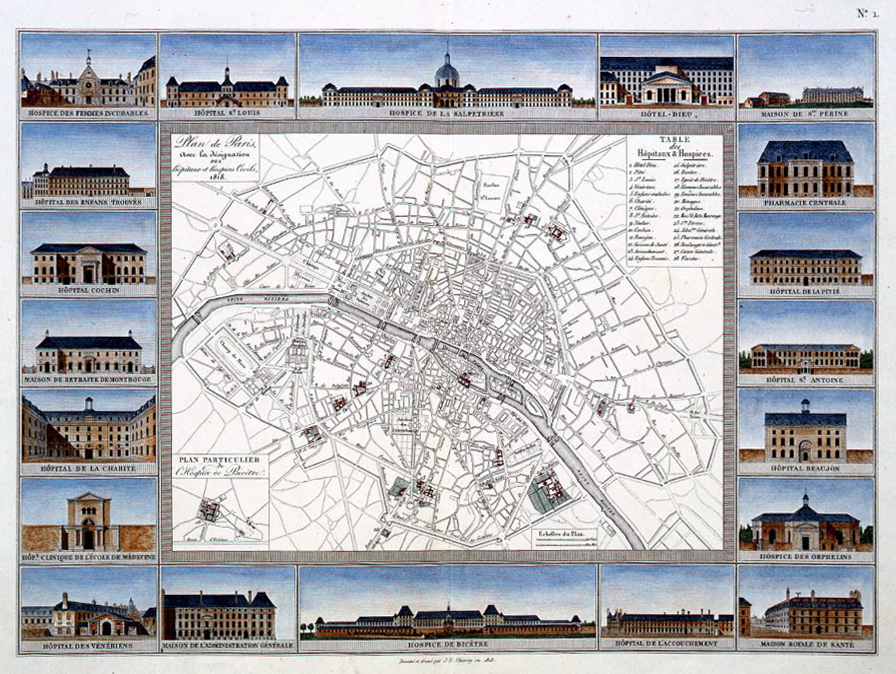
Map of the hospitals of Paris in 1820

The reception of the Mémoire was positive and it raised Tenon's stature from one of a relatively obscure professor at the Paris College of Surgery to that of a respected thinker on hospital reform. It was regarded as a seminal treatment of the subject and was widely read in Europe. Its agenda for hospital reform meshed perfectly with the growing ambition for societal reform that grew out of the Age of Enlightenment. But Tenon himself, with the modesty that typified him, had already foreseen that his study would be superseded by others as science and practice advanced.

Throughout the nineteenth century, Parisian hospital policy seemed to align gradually with Tenon's principles. As he suggested, Parisian hospitals of the nineteenth century were located at the four cardinal points, such as Beaujon to the west, Hospital Saint-Antoine to the east, Hospital Saint Louis and Hospital Lariboisière to the north and Hospital Cochin and Hospital Sainte Anne to the south.^{8–9} On the other hand, contrary to Tenon's recommendation, the Hôtel-Dieu de Paris was finally rebuilt by Baron Haussman in 1877 as a large central hospital very close to its former location next to Notre Dame de Paris.

In 1879, Tenon’s name was given to the hospital of Ménilmontant; that is, what is now the Tenon Hospital in the 20th arrondissement.

The capsule of Tenon, a membrane that envelops the posterior five-sixths of the eyeball still carries his name. He provided a description of the "capsule of Tenon" in 1805.

== Bibliography ==
- Transfer of the Hotel Dieu; Google Books
- Simonsz, H J (2003), "First description of eye muscle 'poulies' by Tenon in 1805.", Strabismus, vol. 11, no. 1 (published Mar 2003), pp. 59–62, doi:10.1076/stra.11.1.59.14092, PMID 12789584, S2CID 42284933
- Roth, A; Mühlendyck, H; De Gottrau, Ph (2002), "[The function of Tenon's capsule revisited]", Journal français d'ophtalmologie, vol. 25, no. 9 (published Nov 2002), pp. 968–76, PMID 12515947
- Dechaume, M; Huard, P; Imbault-Huart, M J (1978), "[Jacques-René Tenon, odontologist and stomatologist]", Actualités odonto-stomatologiques, no. 122 (published Jun 1978), pp. 221–33, PMID 362836
- Greenbaum, LS (1975), ""Measure of civilization": the hospital thought of Jacques Tension on the eve of the French Revolution", Bull Hist Med, vol. 49, no. 1, pp. 43–56, PMID 1093584
