= Les Ormes, Yonne =

Les Ormes
- Commune
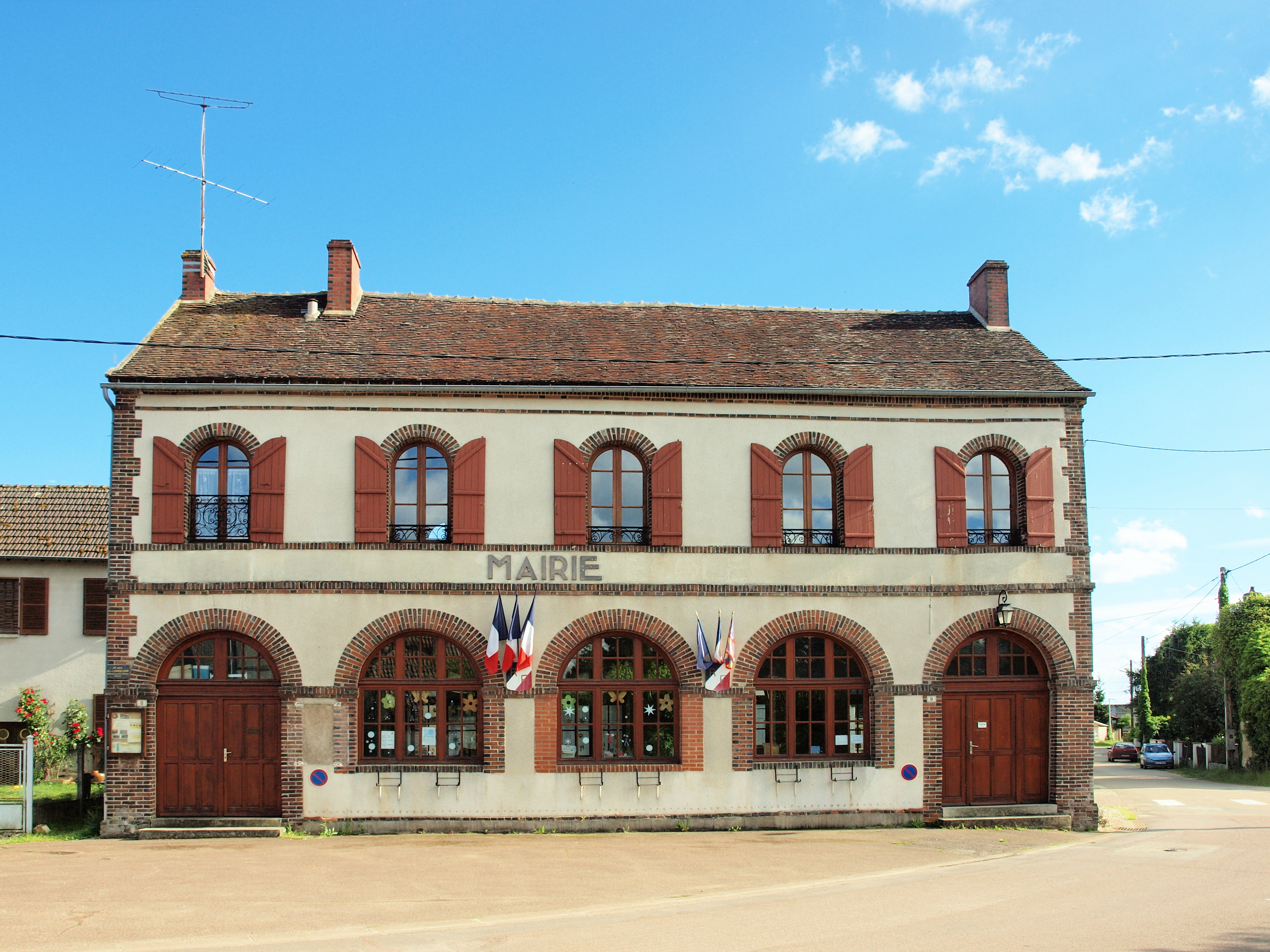
- The town hall in Les Ormes

- Coat of arms
- Location of Les Ormes
- Location within France Location within Bourgogne-Franche-Comté
- Coordinates: 47°51′00″N 3°16′02″E
- Country: France
- Region: Bourgogne-Franche-Comté
- Department: Yonne
- Arrondissement: Auxerre
- Canton: Charny Orée de Puisaye

Government
  - Mayor (2020–2026): Danielle Maillard
- Area^{1}: 8.55 km^{2} (3.30 sq mi)
- Highest elevation: 238 m (781 ft)
- Lowest elevation: 165 m (541 ft)
- Population (2023): 281
  - Density: 32.9/km^{2} (85.1/sq mi)
- Time zone: UTC+01:00 (CET)
  - Summer (DST): UTC+02:00 (CEST)
- INSEE/Postal code: 89281 /89110
- ^{1} French Land Register data, which excludes lakes, ponds, glaciers > 1 km^{2} (0.386 sq mi or 247 acres) and river estuaries.

Les Ormes (French pronunciation: [le.z‿ɔʁm]) is a commune in the Yonne department in Bourgogne-Franche-Comté in north-central France.

== History ==
During World War II, the Yonne region fell under German occupation after the Battle of France in 1940. The area would again see fighting in August 1944 during Operation Kipling, in which local Maquis resistance fighters and British commandos from the Special Air Service were tasked with harassing German troops behind the frontlines in Operation Kipling.

On August 23, 1944, a detachment of commandos from C Squadron, 1st Special Air Service (led by Captain Derrick Harrison) stumbled upon a Waffen-SS unit preparing to execute local civilians in Les Ormes' town square. The two SAS jeeps opened fire on the Germans, and a brief firefight ensued before the commandos made their escape. Harrison estimated at least 60 German soldiers wounded or killed in action. One commando, Lance Corporal James 'Curly' Hall, was killed.

== See also ==
- Communes of the Yonne department
