= Saint-Maurice-Thizouaille =

- Commune
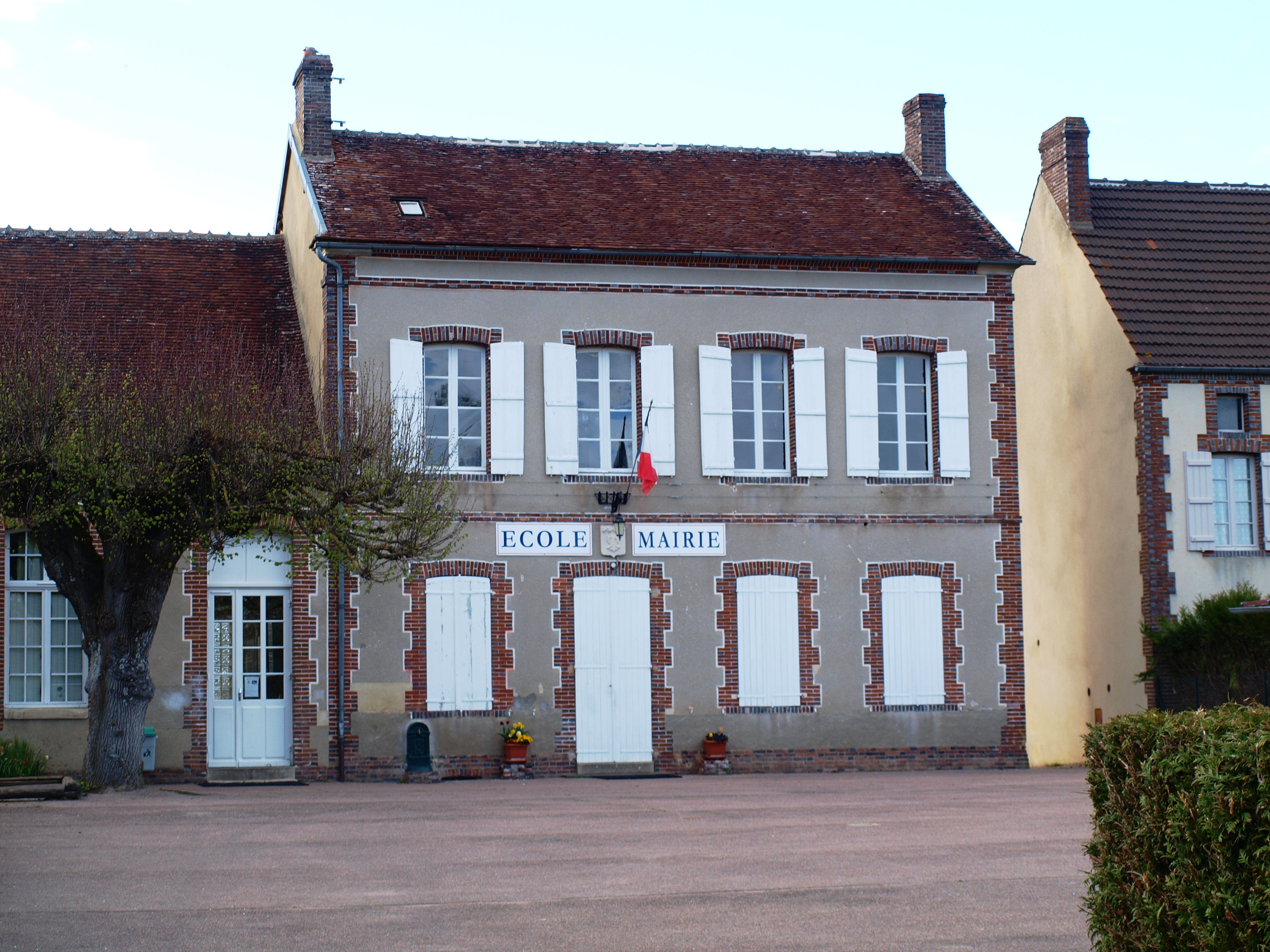
- The town hall in Saint-Maurice-Thizouaille

- Coat of arms
- Location of Saint-Maurice-Thizouaille
- Location within France Location within Bourgogne-Franche-Comté
- Coordinates: 47°50′05″N 3°21′46″E
- Country: France
- Region: Bourgogne-Franche-Comté
- Department: Yonne
- Arrondissement: Auxerre
- Canton: Charny Orée de Puisaye

Government
  - Mayor (2020–2026): Alain Thiery
- Area^{1}: 1.95 km^{2} (0.75 sq mi)
- Highest elevation: 195 m (640 ft)
- Lowest elevation: 123 m (404 ft)
- Population (2023): 256
  - Density: 131/km^{2} (340/sq mi)
- Time zone: UTC+01:00 (CET)
  - Summer (DST): UTC+02:00 (CEST)
- INSEE/Postal code: 89361 /89110
- ^{1} French Land Register data, which excludes lakes, ponds, glaciers > 1 km^{2} (0.386 sq mi or 247 acres) and river estuaries.

Saint-Maurice-Thizouaille (French pronunciation: [sɛ̃ mɔʁis tizwaj]) is a commune in the Yonne department in Bourgogne-Franche-Comté in north-central France.

== See also ==
- Communes of the Yonne department
