= Saint-Martin-sur-Ocre, Yonne =

Saint-Martin-sur-Ocre
- Part of Le Val-d'Ocre
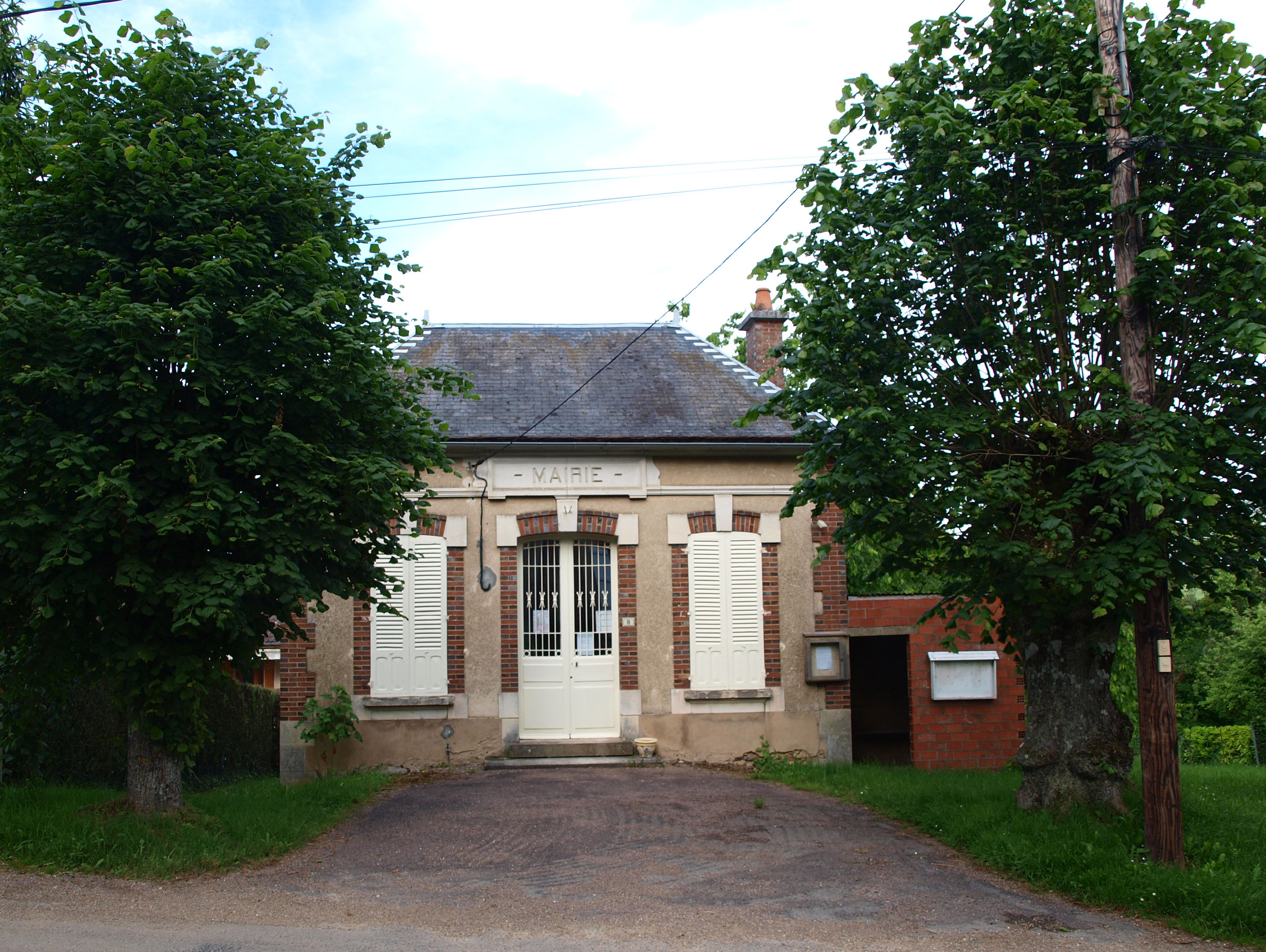
- Location of Saint-Martin-sur-Ocre
- Location within France Location within Bourgogne-Franche-Comté
- Coordinates: 47°48′31″N 3°19′32″E
- Country: France
- Region: Bourgogne-Franche-Comté
- Department: Yonne
- Arrondissement: Auxerre
- Canton: Charny Orée de Puisaye
- Commune: Le Val-d'Ocre
- Area^{1}: 4.58 km^{2} (1.77 sq mi)
- Highest elevation: 267 m (876 ft)
- Lowest elevation: 135 m (443 ft)
- Population (2022): 51
  - Density: 11/km^{2} (29/sq mi)
- Time zone: UTC+01:00 (CET)
  - Summer (DST): UTC+02:00 (CEST)
- Postal code: 89110
- ^{1} French Land Register data, which excludes lakes, ponds, glaciers > 1 km^{2} (0.386 sq mi or 247 acres) and river estuaries.

Saint-Martin-sur-Ocre (French pronunciation: [sɛ̃ maʁtɛ̃ syʁ ɔkʁ]) is a former commune in the Yonne department in Bourgogne-Franche-Comté in north-central France. On 1 January 2016, it was merged into the new commune of Le Val-d'Ocre.

== See also ==
- Communes of the Yonne department
