= Le Val-d'Ocre =

- Commune
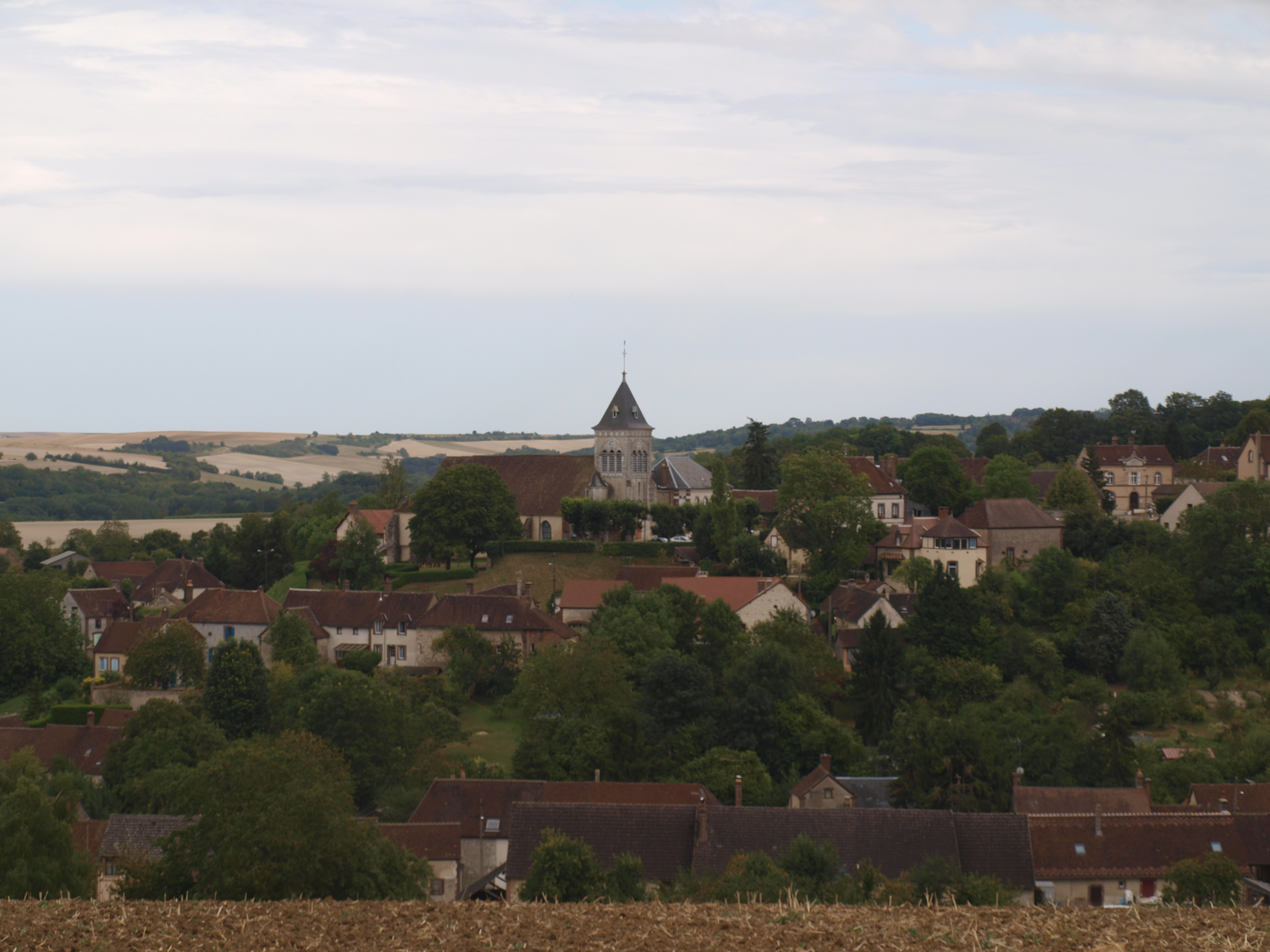
- A general view of Saint-Aubin-Château-Neuf
- Location of Le Val-d'Ocre
- Location within France Location within Bourgogne-Franche-Comté
- Coordinates: 47°49′16″N 3°18′29″E
- Country: France
- Region: Bourgogne-Franche-Comté
- Department: Yonne
- Arrondissement: Auxerre
- Canton: Charny Orée de Puisaye

Government
  - Mayor (2020–2026): Bernard Curnier
- Area^{1}: 29.47 km^{2} (11.38 sq mi)
- Population (2023): 563
  - Density: 19.1/km^{2} (49.5/sq mi)
- Time zone: UTC+01:00 (CET)
  - Summer (DST): UTC+02:00 (CEST)
- INSEE/Postal code: 89334 /89110
- ^{1} French Land Register data, which excludes lakes, ponds, glaciers > 1 km^{2} (0.386 sq mi or 247 acres) and river estuaries.

Le Val-d'Ocre (French pronunciation: [lə val dɔkʁ]) is a commune in the Yonne department of central France. The municipality was established on 1 January 2016 by merger of the former communes of Saint-Aubin-Château-Neuf and Saint-Martin-sur-Ocre.

== See also ==
- Communes of the Yonne department
