= Chamvres =

- Commune
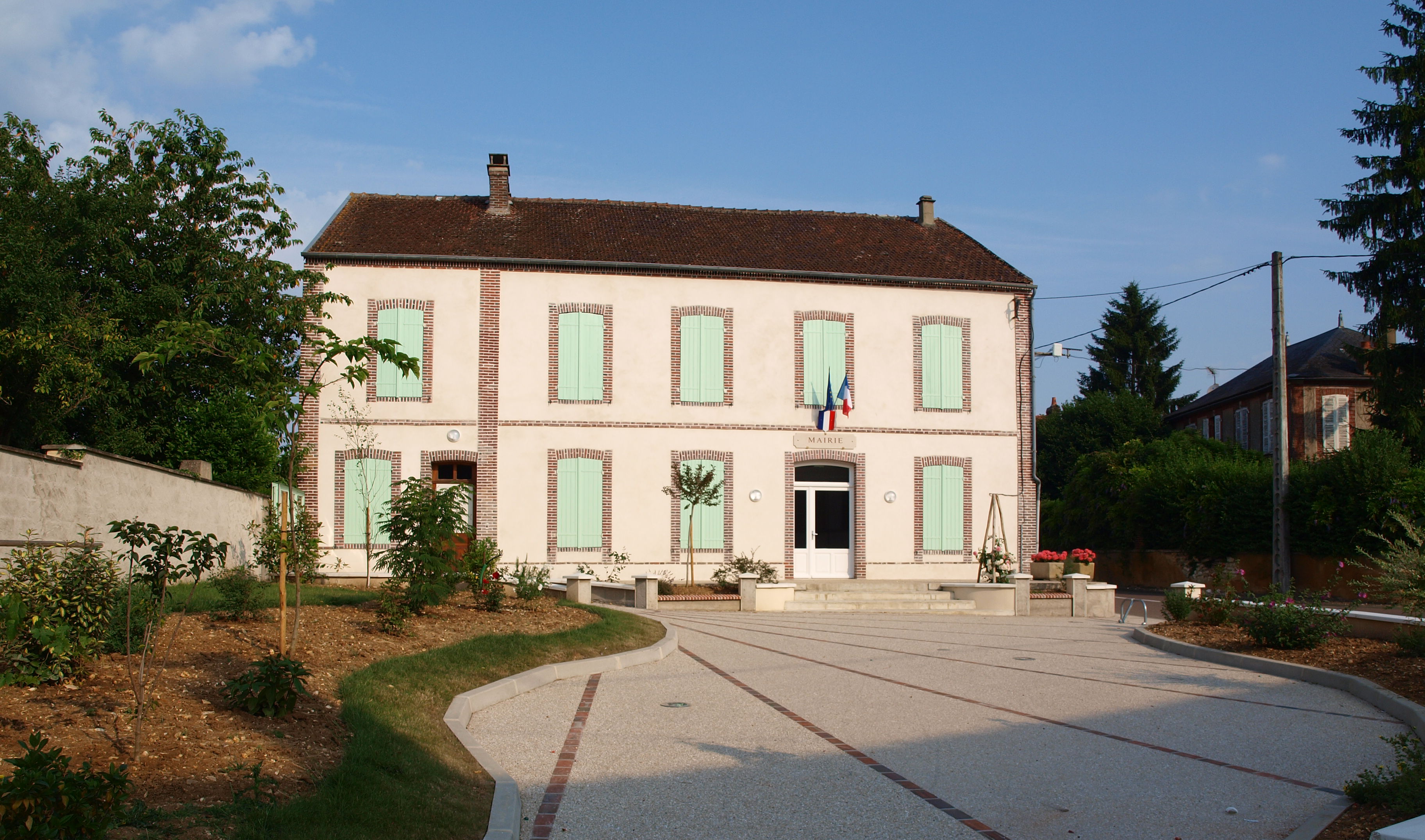
- The town hall in Chamvres
- Location of Chamvres
- Location within France Location within Bourgogne-Franche-Comté
- Coordinates: 47°57′28″N 3°21′43″E
- Country: France
- Region: Bourgogne-Franche-Comté
- Department: Yonne
- Arrondissement: Sens
- Canton: Charny Orée de Puisaye

Government
  - Mayor (2020–2026): Patrice Chassery
- Area^{1}: 5.58 km^{2} (2.15 sq mi)
- Highest elevation: 191 m (627 ft)
- Lowest elevation: 80 m (260 ft)
- Population (2023): 651
  - Density: 117/km^{2} (302/sq mi)
- Time zone: UTC+01:00 (CET)
  - Summer (DST): UTC+02:00 (CEST)
- INSEE/Postal code: 89079 /89300
- ^{1} French Land Register data, which excludes lakes, ponds, glaciers > 1 km^{2} (0.386 sq mi or 247 acres) and river estuaries.

Chamvres (French pronunciation: [ʃɑ̃vʁ]) is a commune in the Yonne department in Bourgogne-Franche-Comté in north-central France.

== See also ==
- Communes of the Yonne department
