= Sommecaise =

- Commune
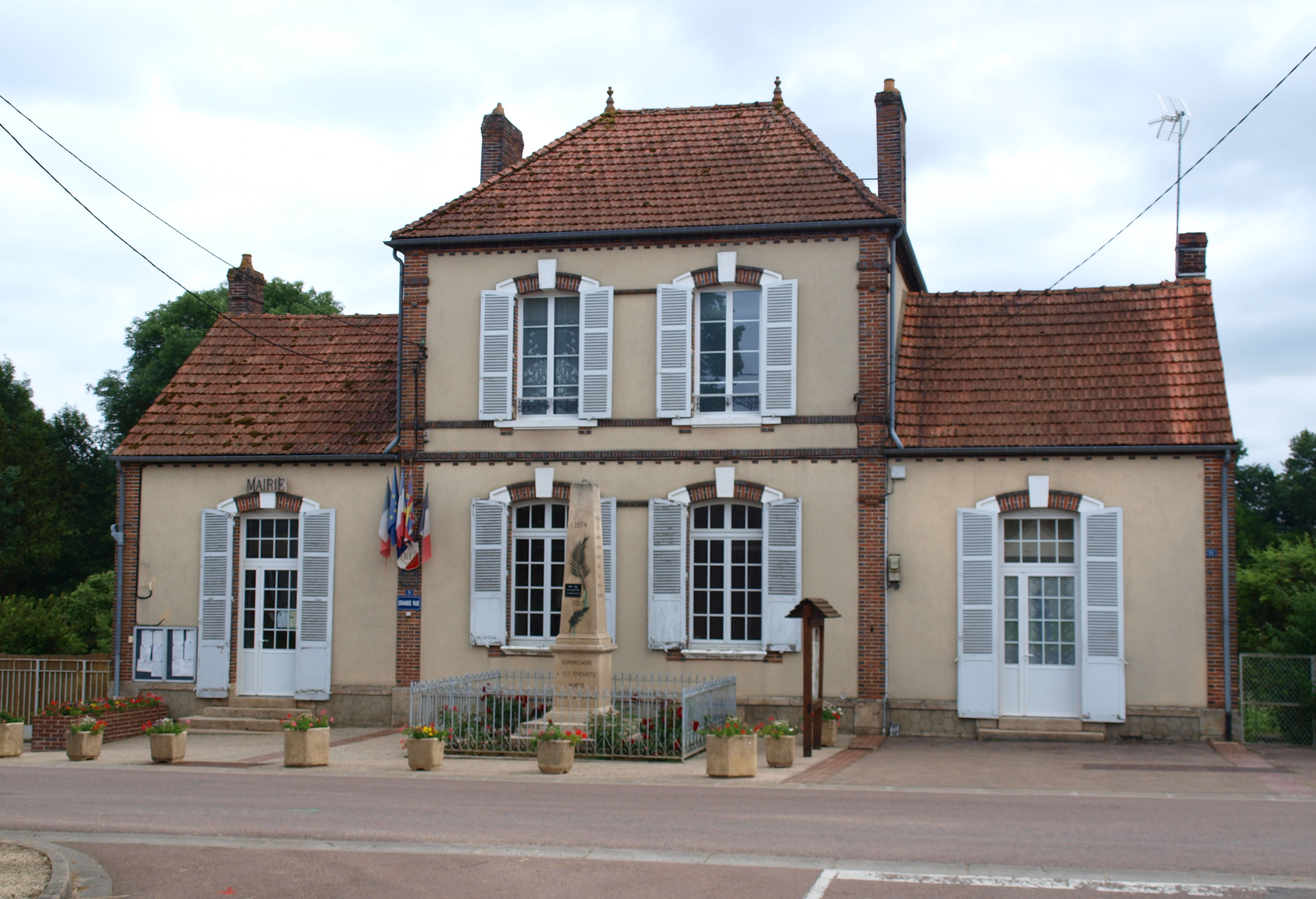
- The town hall in Sommecaise
- Location of Sommecaise
- Location within France Location within Bourgogne-Franche-Comté
- Coordinates: 47°51′01″N 3°14′01″E
- Country: France
- Region: Bourgogne-Franche-Comté
- Department: Yonne
- Arrondissement: Auxerre
- Canton: Charny Orée de Puisaye

Government
  - Mayor (2020–2026): Patrick Dumez
- Area^{1}: 15.53 km^{2} (6.00 sq mi)
- Highest elevation: 226 m (741 ft)
- Lowest elevation: 165 m (541 ft)
- Population (2023): 388
  - Density: 25.0/km^{2} (64.7/sq mi)
- Time zone: UTC+01:00 (CET)
  - Summer (DST): UTC+02:00 (CEST)
- INSEE/Postal code: 89397 /89110
- ^{1} French Land Register data, which excludes lakes, ponds, glaciers > 1 km^{2} (0.386 sq mi or 247 acres) and river estuaries.

Sommecaise (French pronunciation: [sɔmkɛz]) is a commune in the Yonne department in Bourgogne-Franche-Comté in north-central France.

== See also ==
- Communes of the Yonne department
