= Chassy, Yonne =

Chassy
- Commune
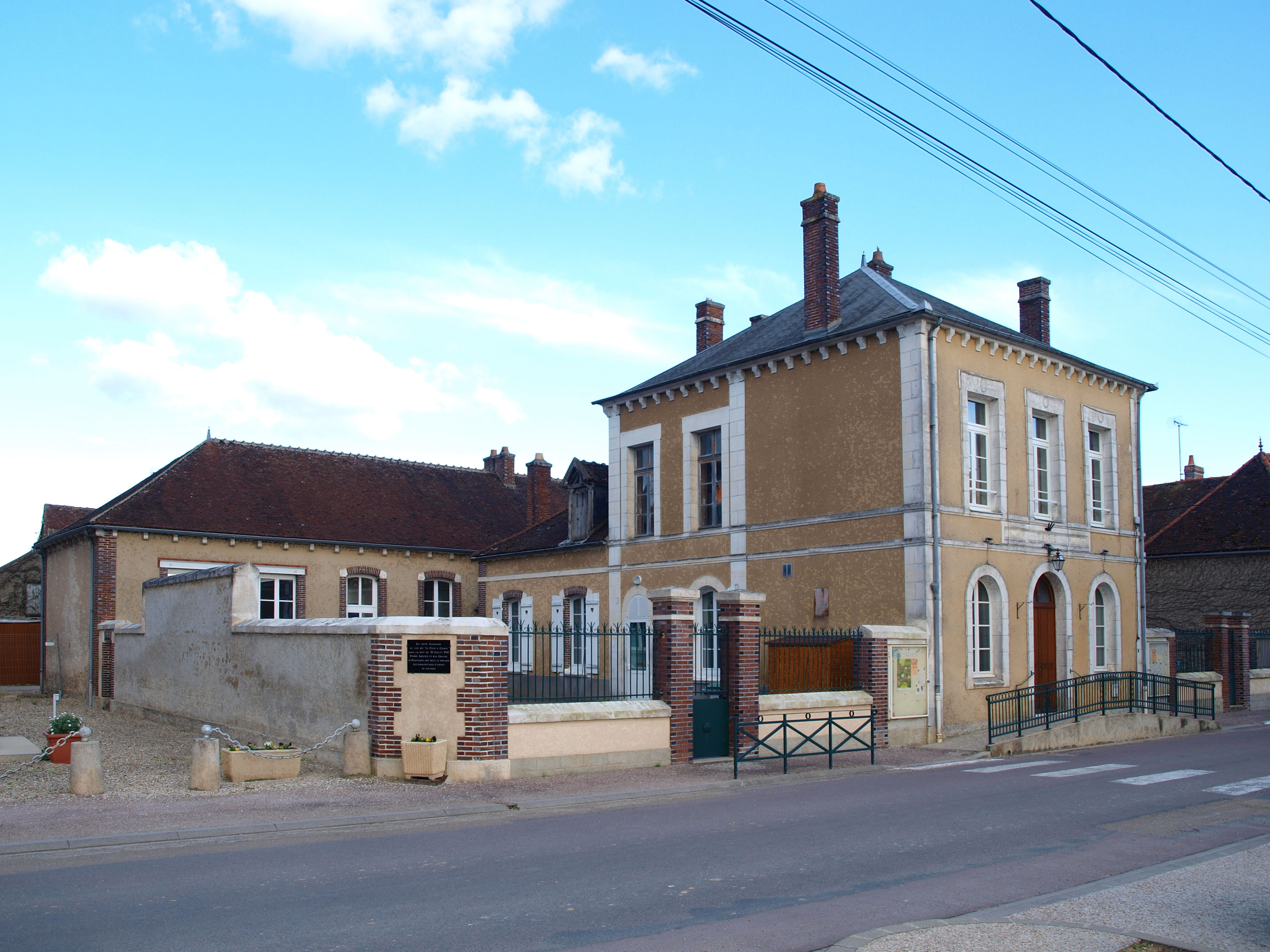
- The town hall in Chassy
- Location of Chassy
- Location within France Location within Bourgogne-Franche-Comté
- Coordinates: 47°51′09″N 3°20′57″E
- Country: France
- Region: Bourgogne-Franche-Comté
- Department: Yonne
- Arrondissement: Auxerre
- Canton: Charny Orée de Puisaye

Government
  - Mayor (2020–2026): Sylviane Michet
- Area^{1}: 16.45 km^{2} (6.35 sq mi)
- Highest elevation: 242 m (794 ft)
- Lowest elevation: 116 m (381 ft)
- Population (2023): 472
  - Density: 28.7/km^{2} (74.3/sq mi)
- Time zone: UTC+01:00 (CET)
  - Summer (DST): UTC+02:00 (CEST)
- INSEE/Postal code: 89088 /89110
- ^{1} French Land Register data, which excludes lakes, ponds, glaciers > 1 km^{2} (0.386 sq mi or 247 acres) and river estuaries.

Chassy (French pronunciation: [ʃasi]) is a commune in the Yonne department in Bourgogne-Franche-Comté in north-central France.

== See also ==
- Communes of the Yonne department
