= Canton of Charny Orée de Puisaye =

Coordinates: 47.89°N 3.09°E

The canton of Charny Orée de Puisaye (before 2021: canton of Charny) is an administrative division of the Yonne department, central France. Its borders were modified at the French canton reorganisation which came into effect in March 2015. Its seat is in Charny-Orée-de-Puisaye.

It consists of the following communes:

1. Chamvres
2. Charny-Orée-de-Puisaye
3. Chassy
4. La Ferté-Loupière
5. Fleury-la-Vallée
6. Merry-la-Vallée
7. Montholon
8. Les Ormes
9. Paroy-sur-Tholon
10. Poilly-sur-Tholon
11. Saint-Maurice-le-Vieil
12. Saint-Maurice-Thizouaille
13. Senan
14. Sépeaux-Saint-Romain
15. Sommecaise
16. Le Val-d'Ocre
17. Valravillon
