= Saint Denis =

Saint Denis may refer to:

== People ==
- Saint Denis of Paris, 3rd-century Christian martyr and saint, patron saint of Paris
- Denis the Carthusian (1402–1471)
- Brent St. Denis (born 1950), Canadian politician
- Frédéric St-Denis (born 1986), Canadian hockey player
- Janou Saint-Denis (1930–2000), Canadian poet and actress
- Jon St. Denis (born c. 1978), a Canadian curler
- Joseph St. Denis (1870–1966), Canadian politician
- Lise St-Denis (born 1940), Canadian politician
- Louis Juchereau de St. Denis (1676–1744), French-Canadian soldier and explorer
- Richard St. Denis, American wheelchair charity founder
- Ruth St. Denis, American dancer
- Yves St-Denis, Canadian politician
- Benoît Saint Denis, French mixed martial artist

== Places ==
=== Canada ===
- Saint-Denis (electoral district), in Quebec 1917–1997
- Saint Denis Street, in Montreal, Quebec
- Saint-Denis-De La Bouteillerie, Quebec, formerly called Saint-Denis
- Saint-Denis-sur-Richelieu, Quebec
- Saint-Denis-de-Brompton, Quebec
- St. Denis, Saskatchewan

=== France ===
- Saint-Denis, Seine-Saint-Denis, in Paris
  - Arrondissement of Saint-Denis, Seine-Saint-Denis
- Rue Saint-Denis (Paris)
- Morey-Saint-Denis, in the Côte-d'Or department
  - Clos Saint-Denis, an Appellation d'origine contrôlée and Grand Cru vineyard
- Saint-Denis, Aude, in the Aude department
- Saint-Denis, Gard, in the Gard department
- Saint-Denis, Réunion, capital of the French overseas department of Réunion
- Saint-Denis-Catus, in the Lot department
- Saint-Denis-Combarnazat, in the Puy-de-Dôme department
- Saint-Denis-d'Aclon, in the Seine-Maritime department
- Saint-Denis-d'Anjou, in the Mayenne department
- Saint-Denis-d'Augerons, in the Eure department
- Saint-Denis-d'Authou, in the Eure-et-Loir department
- Saint-Denis-de-Cabanne, in the Loire department
- Saint-Denis-de-Gastines, in the Mayenne department
- Saint-Denis-de-Jouhet, in the Indre department
- Saint-Denis-de-l'Hôtel, in the Loiret department
- Saint-Denis-de-Mailloc, in the Calvados department
- Saint-Denis-de-Méré, in the Calvados department
- Saint-Denis-de-Palin, in the Cher department
- Saint-Denis-de-Pile, in the Gironde department
- Saint-Denis-des-Coudrais, in the Sarthe department
- Saint-Denis-des-Monts, in the Eure department
- Saint-Denis-des-Murs, in the Haute-Vienne department
- Saint-Denis-des-Puits, in the Eure-et-Loir department
- Saint-Denis-de-Vaux, in the Saône-et-Loire department
- Saint-Denis-de-Villenette, in the Orne department
- Saint-Denis-d'Oléron, in the Charente-Maritime department
- Saint-Denis-d'Orques, in the Sarthe department
- Saint-Denis-du-Béhélan, in the Eure department
- Saint-Denis-du-Maine, in the Mayenne department
- Saint-Denis-du-Payré, in the Vendée department
- Saint-Denis-du-Pin, in the Charente-Maritime department
- Saint-Denis-en-Bugey, in the Ain department
- Saint-Denis-en-Margeride, in the Lozère department
- Saint-Denis-en-Val, in the Loiret department
- Saint-Denis-la-Chevasse, in the Vendée department
- Saint-Denis-le-Ferment, in the Eure department
- Saint-Denis-le-Gast, in the Manche department
- Saint-Denis-lès-Bourg, in the Ain department
- Saint-Denis-lès-Martel, in the Lot department
- Saint-Denis-les-Ponts, in the Eure-et-Loir department
- Saint-Denis-lès-Rebais, in the Seine-et-Marne department
- Saint-Denis-lès-Sens, in the Yonne department
- Saint-Denis-le-Thiboult, in the Seine-Maritime department
- Saint-Denis-le-Vêtu, in the Manche department
- Saint-Denis-Maisoncelles, in the Calvados department
- Saint-Denis-sur-Coise, in the Loire department
- Saint-Denis-sur-Huisne, in the Orne department
- Saint-Denis-sur-Loire, in the Loir-et-Cher department
- Saint-Denis-sur-Ouanne, in the Yonne department
- Saint-Denis-sur-Sarthon, in the Orne department
- Saint-Denis-sur-Scie, in the Seine-Maritime department

=== Elsewhere ===
- Saint-Denis, Mons, Belgium
- Saint-Denis, Aosta Valley, Italy
- St. Denis, Maryland, United States
  - St. Denis station

== Other uses ==
- SS St Denis (1908), a ship, formerly SS Munich
- St. Denis' Church (disambiguation)
- St. Denis Medical, an American television mockumentary sitcom

== See also ==
- Saint Dionysius (disambiguation)
- Denis (disambiguation)
- Saint Dennis (disambiguation)
- St Denys Church (disambiguation)
- Montjoie Saint Denis!, the battle cry and motto of the Kingdom of France
- CFS Lac St. Denis, a former Canadian Forces Station in Quebec
- Théâtre Saint-Denis, in Montreal, Canada
- St Denys, a district of Southampton, England
