= Jean-Pierre Coffe =

French food critic and television host

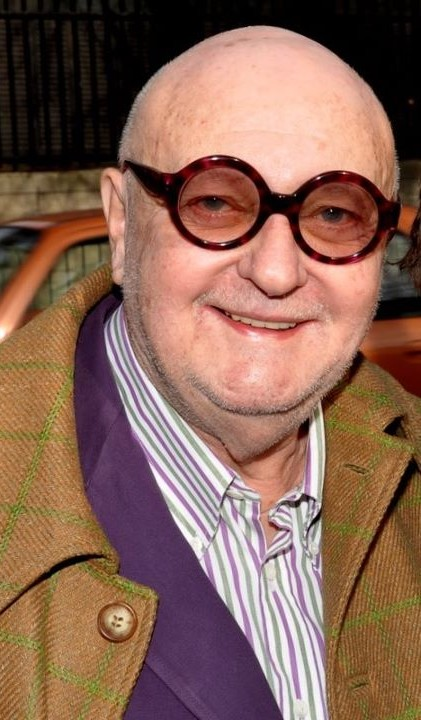
- Coffe in 2012
- Born: Jean-Pierre Henri Marcel Adolphe Coffe; 24 March 1938; Lunéville, Meurthe-et-Moselle, France
- Died: 29 March 2016 (aged 78); Lanneray, France
- Occupations: Radio presenter, television presenter, food critic
- Notable credit(s): Comment c'est fait ? C'est tout Coffe; Ça se bouffe pas, ça se mange (France Inter)
- Website: www.jeanpierrecoffe.com

Jean-Pierre Coffe (French pronunciation: [ʒɑ̃ pjɛʁ kɔf]; 24 March 1938 – 29 March 2016) was a French radio and television presenter, food critic, and author.

== Early life and education ==
Jean-Pierre Coffe spent a major part of his childhood in the town where he was born, Lunéville. He never knew his father, mobilized in 1937 and killed on the field of battle in 1940. He was raised by his mother, who took over the family hairdressing salon. His grandmother was a cook and his grandfather a market gardener.

His mother left Lorraine for Paris where he studied at boarding school. At the age of 13, he was seized by a passion for theatre. After completing his studies, he took classes at the Cours Simon and had a number of small jobs at the same time.

Throughout his life, he was passionate about having healthy eating habits. When modern, unhealthy foods gained popularity, he was enraged and said, "This is sh*t!" These three words quickly became his supposed catchphrase, caught by the public and directed to the new eating trends, even though he had only said it publicly twice.

== Television career ==
Jean-Pierre Coffe then began a career in television in the early 1970s. He joined Canal+ on November 4, 1984, and appeared on a number of occasions in the programs hosted by Michel Deist. In 1992 and 1993, he made his first appearances in La Grande Famille hosted by Jean-Luc Delarue and Demain hosted by Michel Denisot for the cooking theme.

He then joined the French public channel where he hosted a cooking program with children titled Comment c'est fait ? ("How is it done?") from 1992 to 1993 on France 3, followed in 1994 by C'est tout Coffe ("This is all Coffe") on France 2. He joined private channel TF1 in 1999 to present Bien jardiner ("Gardening well"), produced by Jean-Luc Delarue, who finally decided to end the broadcast soon after, which marked the end of their friendship. In 2003, he joined Michel Drucker on France 2 where he served as a food critic in the program Vivement dimanche prochain. On 5 September 2012 he announced his departure of the program to spend more time on writing.

== Radio career ==
In September 1990 he joined the team of Les Grosses Têtes, a radio program hosted by Philippe Bouvard on RTL, for which he became a regular participant. He left in September 2010 and soon after joined the program On va s'gêner, hosted by Laurent Ruquier on Europe 1, which he left after one season in 2011. In 2014, he returned to Les Grosses Têtes on RTL when Laurent Ruquier took over as presenter. From 1998 to June 2008, he presented the program Ça se bouffe pas, ça se mange on France Inter every Saturday. At the end of the show on June 21, 2008, he announced his forced retirement by France Inter management.

== Books ==
Coffe published many books, ranging from recipes and gardening, to critiques of mass-produced food production and the manufacture of commercial food products. Some of his best-sellers were:

- Le Bon Vivre (Living Well) and Le Vrai Vivre (Authentic Living) in 1992,
- Comme à la Maison (Homely cooking) in 1993,
- Le Potager Plaisir (The Joy of Home-grown Food) and Le Marché (The Food Market) in 1998,
- Fleurs Bonheur (The Joy of Flowers) in 1999,
- Le Verger Gourmand (The Greedy Gardener) in 2000,
- La Véritable Histoire des Jardins de Versailles (The True History of the Gardens of Versailles), with Alain Baraton in 2007,
- Les Recettes Inratables de Jean-Pierre Coffe (Jean-Pierre Coffe's Failure-proof Recipes) in 2007,
- Mes Confitures (My Jams) in 2008, and
- Le Plaisir à Petit Prix (Good Food on a Budget) in 2009.

== Death ==
On 29 March 2016, Coffe died at his home in Lanneray.

== Filmography ==
Year	Title	Role	Notes
1972	What a Flash!		
1976	Scrambled Eggs	Le maire	
1977	Le dernier baiser		
1978	Violette Nozière	Le docteur Déon	
1978	La clé sur la porte	Le collègue prof	
1979	Ils sont grands, ces petits	Charles, l'ex-mari	
1979	Au bout du bout du banc	Brigitte's husband	
1979	The Associate	L'employé du museum d'histoire naturelle	
1979	Gros-Câlin	Le Père Joseph	
1984	Swann in Love	Aime	
1985	All Mixed Up	Le commissaire de police	
1986	Suivez mon regard		
2008	Mia and the Migoo	Nénesse	Voice
2013	C'est bon	Narrator	Voice, (final film role)

== Honors ==
- Chevalier (Knight) of the Legion of Honour
- Commander of the Order of Agricultural Merit
