= Pierre Avezard =

French creator of outsider art (1909–1992)

- Born: 30 December 1909; Vienne-en-Val (Loiret)
- Died: 24 July 1992 (aged 82); Jargeau (Loiret)

Pierre Avezard (30 December 1909 – 24 July 1992), also known as "Petit Pierre", was a French creator of outsider art.

He is known for creating the "Le manège de Petit Pierre" (Literal translation Petit Pierre carousel), exhibited at La Fabuloserie in Dicy in the Yonne department. He lived his entire life in the village of Fay-aux-Loges, in the Loiret department.
