= Malicorne =

Malicorne may refer to:

- Malicorne (band), a French band, named after Malicorne-sur-Sarthe

== Places in France ==
- Malicorne-sur-Sarthe, in the Sarthe department
- Malicorne, Allier, in the Allier department
- Malicorne, Yonne, in the Yonne department
