= Grandchamp =

Grandchamp may refer to:

== Places in France ==
- Grandchamp, Ardennes, in the Ardennes department
- Grandchamp, Haute-Marne, in the Haute-Marne department
- Grandchamp, Sarthe, in the Sarthe department
- Grandchamp, Yvelines, in the Yvelines department
- Grandchamp, Yonne, in the Yonne department
- Grandchamp-le-Château, in the Calvados department
- Neuvy-Grandchamp, in the Saône-et-Loire department

== People with the surname ==
- Gail Grandchamp (born 1955), American boxer
