= St. Denis' Church =

St. Denis' Church may refer to:

- St. Denis Catholic Church, North Whitefield, Maine, United States
- St Denis Church, East Hatley, Cambridgeshire, England
- St Denis Church, Joondanna, Western Australia
- St. Denis' Church (Hopewell Junction, New York), United States
- Church of St. Denis (Liège), Belgium
- St Denis' Church, Morton, Nottinghamshire, England
- St Denis' Church, Otterham, Cornwall, England
- Basilica of Saint-Denis, Paris, France

== See also ==
- Saint Denis (disambiguation)
- St Denys Church (disambiguation)
- St Dionis, Parsons Green, London, England
