= Denis Vrain-Lucas =

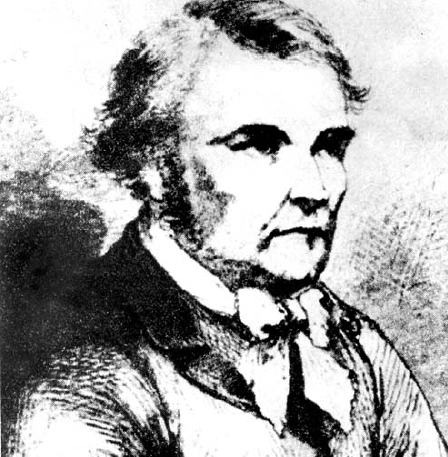
- Vrain-Lucas c. 1880s
- Born: December 1, 1816; Lanneray, canton of Châteaudun, France
- Died: April 11, 1881 (aged 64); Châteaudun, canton of Châteaudun, France
- Other name: Denis Lucas
- Known for: forger who sold counterfeit letters and other documents to French manuscript collectors

Denis Vrain-Lucas (December 1, 1816 – April 11, 1881) was a French forger who sold counterfeit letters and other documents to French manuscript collectors. He even wrote purported letters from biblical figures in French.

Vrain-Lucas was trained as a law clerk, but by 1854, he had begun to forge historical documents, especially letters. He began by using writing material and self-made inks from the appropriate period and forged mainly documents from French authors. He collected historical details from the Imperial library. As his forgeries became more readily accepted, he began to produce letters from historical figures.

In 1861, Vrain-Lucas approached French mathematician and collector Michel Chasles and sold him forged letters of Robert Boyle, Isaac Newton and Blaise Pascal. In one of them, Pascal supposedly claimed that he had discovered the laws of gravity before Newton. Since this would have meant that a Frenchman had stated these laws before an Englishman, Chasles accepted the letter and asked for more. Vrain-Lucas proceeded to sell him hundreds of letters from historical and biblical figures, all in 19th-century French.

Over 16 years, Vrain-Lucas forged a total of 27,000 autographs, letters, and other documents from historical figures including Mary Magdalene, Cleopatra, Judas Iscariot, Pontius Pilate, Joan of Arc, Cicero and Dante Alighieri - written in 19th-century French and on watermarked paper. The most prominent French collectors bought them, helping him accumulate a significant wealth of hundreds of thousands of francs.

In 1867, Chasles approached the French Academy of Science, claiming to have proof that Pascal had discovered the laws of gravity before Newton. When he showed them the letters, scholars of the Academy noticed that the handwriting was very different compared to letters that were definitely by Pascal. Chasles defended the letters' authenticity, but was eventually forced to reveal that Vrain-Lucas had sold them to him.

When Academy members complained about the anachronisms in the letters, Vrain-Lucas forged more letters to explain away his earlier mistakes. Debate continued until 1868; the next year, he was arrested for forgery. In the following trial, Chasles had to testify how he had been duped, how he had purchased large numbers of other forged letters and how he had paid total of 140,000-150,000 francs for them.

In February 1870, the Correctional Tribunal of Paris sentenced Vrain-Lucas to two years in prison for forgery. He also had to pay a fine of 500 francs and all legal costs. Chasles received no restitution for the money he had wasted on the forgeries. After his sentence, Vrain-Lucas disappeared from the public eye. In 2004, the journal Critical Inquiry published a recently "discovered" 1871 letter written by Vrain-Lucas (from prison) to Chasles, conveying Vrain-Lucas's perspective on these events, itself an invention.
