= Jacques Trovic =

French artist

- Born: June 15, 1948; Anzin
- Died: October 27, 2018 (aged 70); Ath

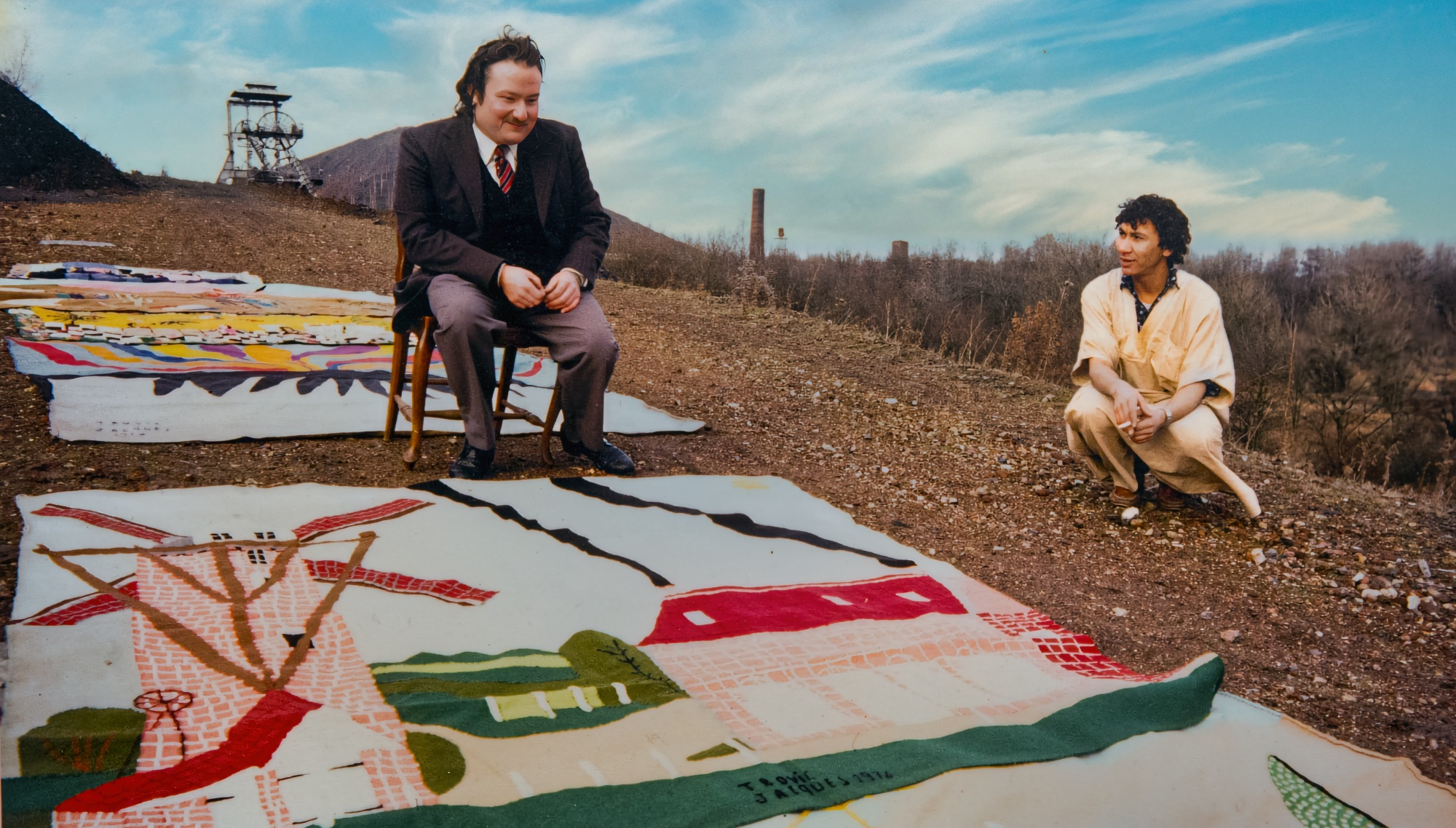
Photograph of Jacques Trovic surrounded by its tapestries on the slag heap of Sabatier, with Selim Moktat, on December 31, 1983.

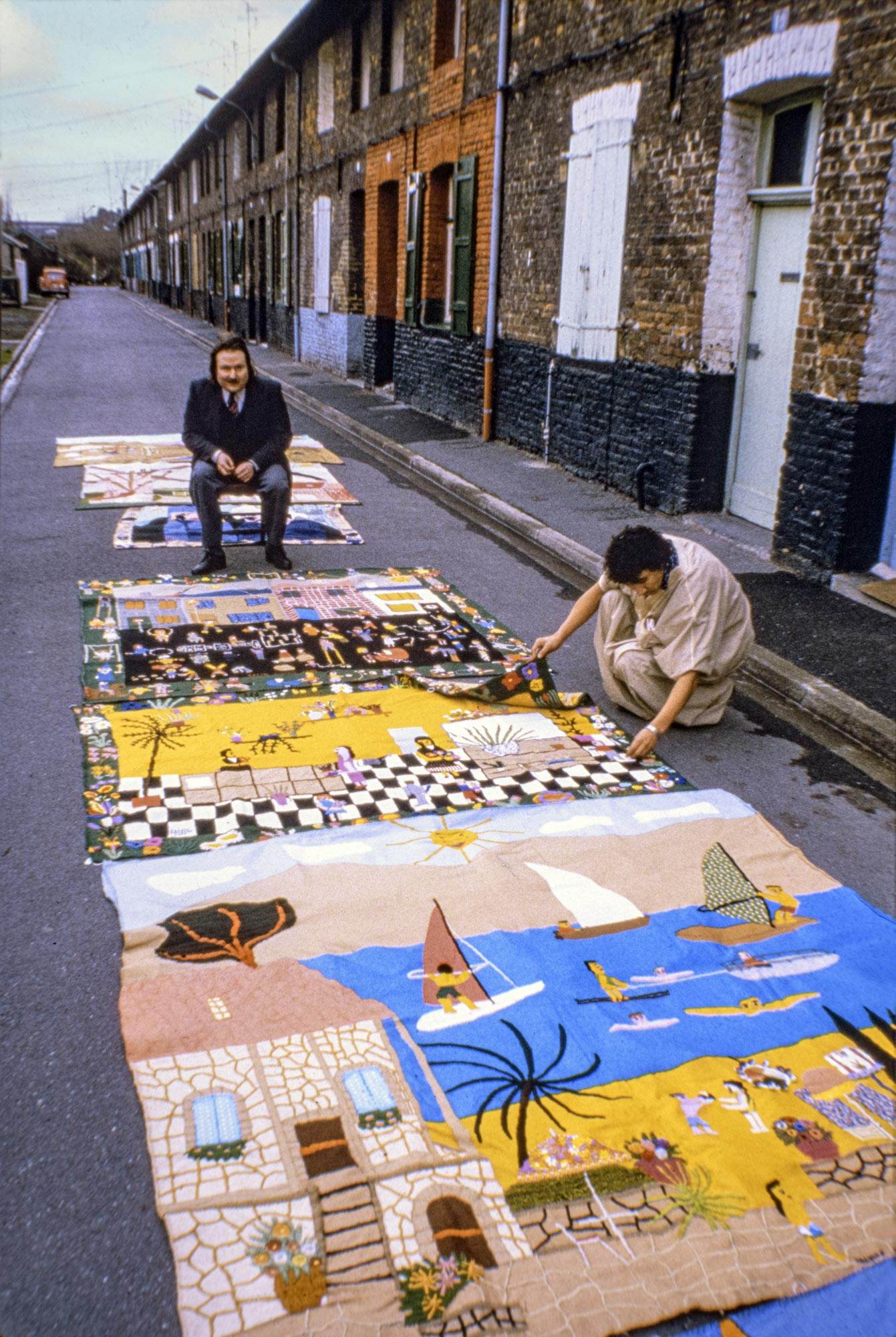
Jacques Trovic and his tapestries in the miners village (coron) of Raismes in December 1983

Jacques Trovic (June 15, 1948 - October 27, 2018) was a French artist. Active from the 1960s, he created tapestries using sewing and embroidery techniques on popular or folklore themes. He is generally considered as belonging to the Outsider Art movement.

== Biography ==
Jacques Trovic was born in Anzin, a mining town near Valenciennes in the North of France. Due to health issues, he attended school intermittently. He learned embroidery and sewing with his mother and two sisters, who were seamstresses. As a teenager, he attended the art school of Saint-Amand-les-Eaux. He lived in Anzin for most of his life, and spent his later years at la Pommeraie in Belgium.

== Works ==
=== Tapestries ===
Trovic's principal themes and subjects are the mining culture of the North of France (La Jonction souterraine i[The Underground Junction], 1975), the folklore, traditional crafts (Le Cordonnier [The Shoemaker]), quotidian life (Le Marchand de ballons [The Seller of Balloons], 1974) or French regions,.

Trovic's tapestries use hessian fabric, and are generally several meters in size, which he progressively covered with pieces of fabric and embroideries.

=== Catalogs and illustrated books ===
- Musique en fêtes, exhibition catalog, 1999
- Le Petit Mousseron, by André Dubuc, illustrated by Jacques Trovic, 2004.

== Collections ==
His work is exhibited in several museums and organisations dedicated to Outsider art.

- Collection de l'art brut in Lausanne;
- Art&Marges in Brussels;
- Musée d'art naïf in Laval;
- Musée international d'art naïf Anatole Jakovsky in Nice;
- La Fabuloserie in Dicy;
- The textile museum of Cholet;
- Le centre Historique Minier in Lewarde;
- Museum of Saint-Amand-les-Eaux
