= Saint Dennis =

Saint Dennis may refer to:

- Saint Denis of Paris, Christian saint
- St Dennis, Cornwall, a village in England
  - St Dennis Junction, a railway station
- St. Dennis, Louisville, a place in Kentucky, United States

== See also ==
- Saint Denis (disambiguation)
- Saint Denise (disambiguation)
- St Denys, a place in England
