= St Denys Church =

St Denys Church may refer to:

- St Denys Anglican Church, Queensland, Australia
- Church of St Denys, Colmworth, Bedfordshire, England
- St Denys' Church, Little Barford, Bedfordshire, England
- Church of St Denys, Lisvane, Cardiff, Wales
- St Denys' Church, Sleaford, Lincolnshire, England
- St Denys' Church, Warminster, Wiltshire, England
- St Denys's Church, York, England

== See also ==
- Saint Denis (disambiguation)
- St. Denis' Church (disambiguation)
- St. Denys Priory, Hampshire, England
- St. Denys Theological Institute, Paris
- Community of St. Denys, England
