= Essouvert =

- Commune
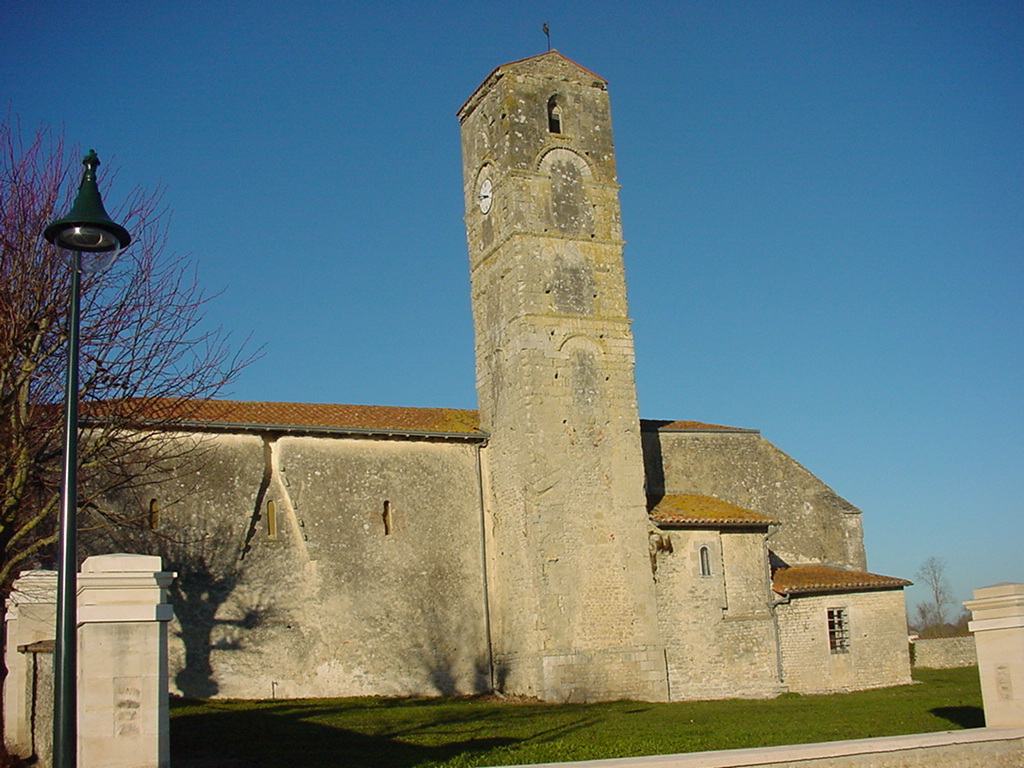
- The church in Saint-Denis-du-Pin
- Location of Essouvert
- Location within France Location within Nouvelle-Aquitaine
- Coordinates: 45°59′10″N 0°31′19″W
- Country: France
- Region: Nouvelle-Aquitaine
- Department: Charente-Maritime
- Arrondissement: Saint-Jean-d'Angély
- Canton: Saint-Jean-d'Angély

Government
  - Mayor (2020–2026): Henri Auger
- Area^{1}: 30.23 km^{2} (11.67 sq mi)
- Population (2023): 1,021
  - Density: 33.77/km^{2} (87.48/sq mi)
- Time zone: UTC+01:00 (CET)
  - Summer (DST): UTC+02:00 (CEST)
- INSEE/Postal code: 17277 /17400
- ^{1} French Land Register data, which excludes lakes, ponds, glaciers > 1 km^{2} (0.386 sq mi or 247 acres) and river estuaries.

Essouvert (French pronunciation: [esuvɛʁ]) is a commune in the Charente-Maritime department of southwestern France. The municipality was established on 1 January 2016 and consists of the former communes of Saint-Denis-du-Pin and La Benâte.

== See also ==
- Communes of the Charente-Maritime department
