= Douchy-Montcorbon =

- Commune
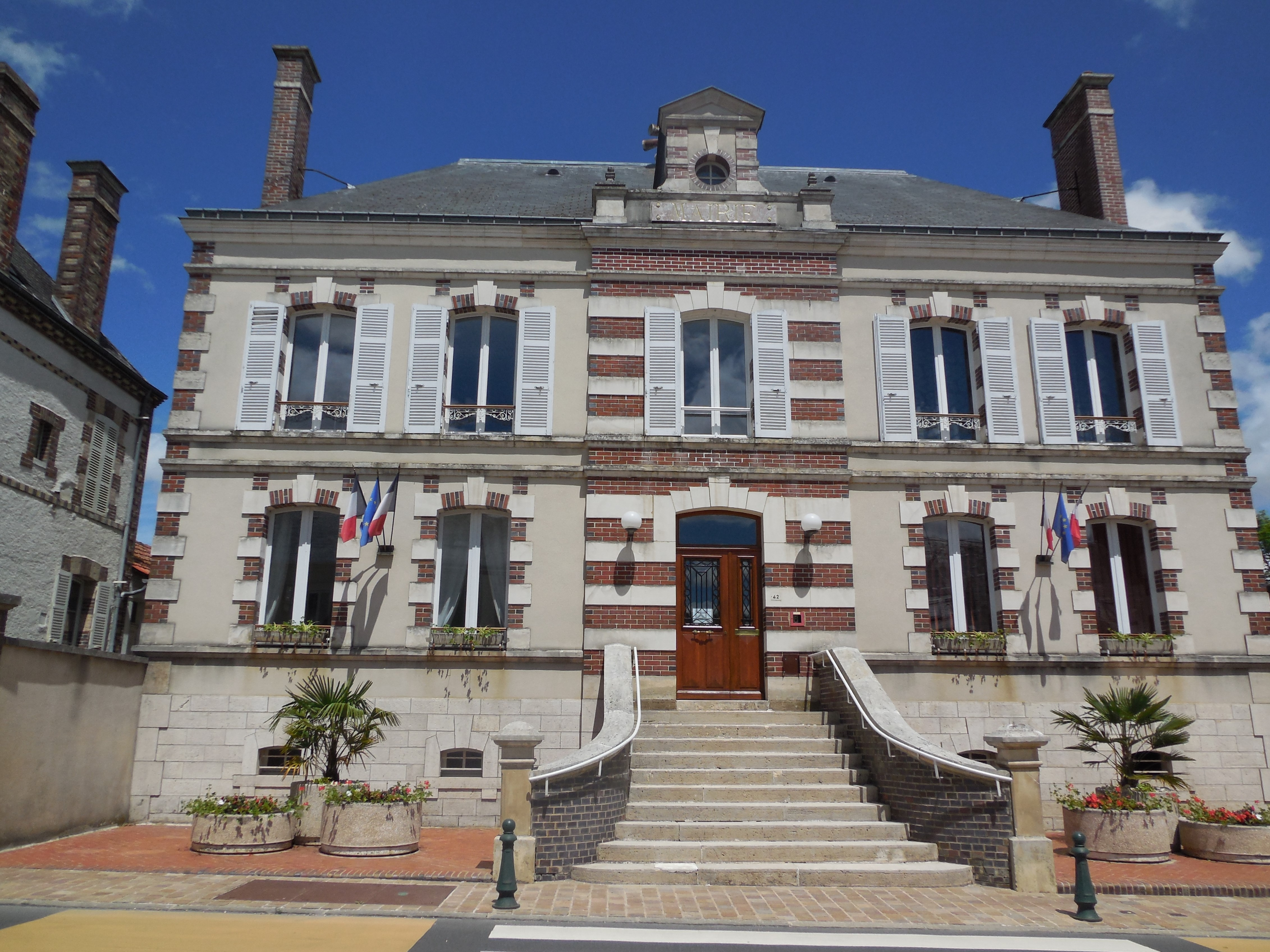
- The town hall of Douchy-Montcorbon

- Coat of arms
- Location of Douchy-Montcorbon
- Location within France Location within Centre-Val de Loire
- Coordinates: 47°56′35″N 3°03′11″E
- Country: France
- Region: Centre-Val de Loire
- Department: Loiret
- Arrondissement: Montargis
- Canton: Courtenay
- Area^{1}: 50.12 km^{2} (19.35 sq mi)
- Population (2023): 1,370
  - Density: 27.3/km^{2} (70.8/sq mi)
- Time zone: UTC+01:00 (CET)
  - Summer (DST): UTC+02:00 (CEST)
- INSEE/Postal code: 45129 /45220
- ^{1} French Land Register data, which excludes lakes, ponds, glaciers > 1 km^{2} (0.386 sq mi or 247 acres) and river estuaries.

Douchy-Montcorbon (French pronunciation: [duʃi mɔ̃kɔʁbɔ̃]) is a commune in the Loiret department of central France. The municipality was established on 1 January 2016 by merger of the former communes of Douchy and Montcorbon.

== Notable people ==
- Alain Delon, French actor and businessman, lived in Douchy a large part of the year, from 1971 until his death in 2024.
- Mireille Darc, French model and actress, also lived in Douchy when she was Alain Delon's longtime companion.

== See also ==
- Communes of the Loiret department
