= Saint-Denis-Lanneray =

- Commune
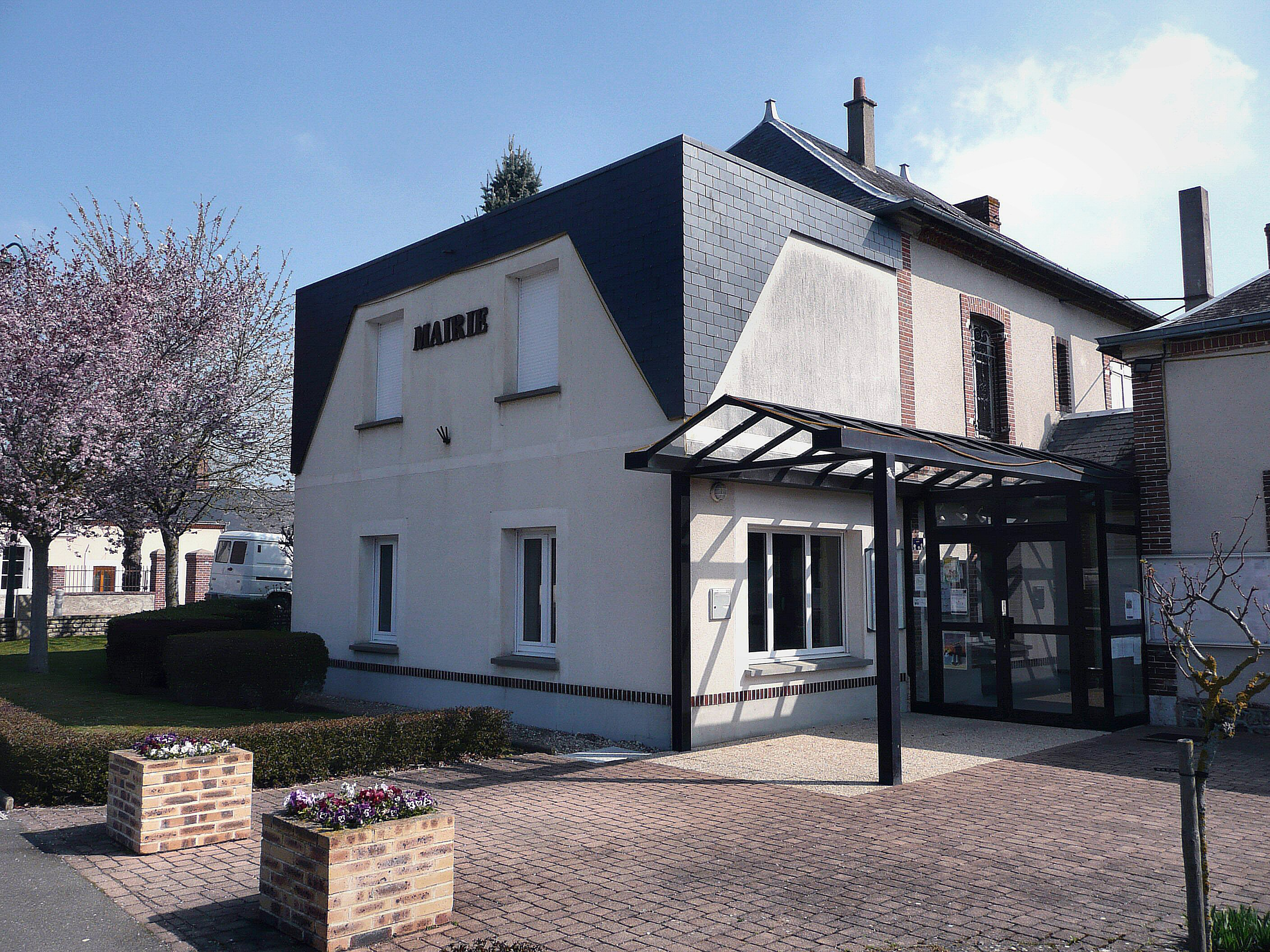
- The town hall in Saint-Denis-Lanneray
- Location of Saint-Denis-Lanneray
- Location within France Location within Centre-Val de Loire
- Coordinates: 48°04′06″N 1°17′38″E
- Country: France
- Region: Centre-Val de Loire
- Department: Eure-et-Loir
- Arrondissement: Châteaudun
- Canton: Châteaudun
- Intercommunality: Grand Châteaudun

Government
  - Mayor (2020–2026): Jean-Yves Panais
- Area^{1}: 40.43 km^{2} (15.61 sq mi)
- Highest elevation: 162 m (531 ft)
- Lowest elevation: 100 m (330 ft)
- Population (2023): 2,086
  - Density: 51.60/km^{2} (133.6/sq mi)
- Time zone: UTC+01:00 (CET)
  - Summer (DST): UTC+02:00 (CEST)
- INSEE/Postal code: 28334 /28200
- ^{1} French Land Register data, which excludes lakes, ponds, glaciers > 1 km^{2} (0.386 sq mi or 247 acres) and river estuaries.

Saint-Denis-Lanneray (French pronunciation: [sɛ̃ dəni lanʁɛ]) is a commune in the Eure-et-Loir department in northern France. It was established on 1 January 2019 by merger of the former communes of Saint-Denis-les-Ponts (the seat) and Lanneray.

== Population ==
Population data refer to the commune in its geography as of January 2025.

Historical population
Year	Pop.	±% p.a.
1968	1,513	—
1975	1,986	+3.96%
1982	2,201	+1.48%
1990	2,048	−0.90%
1999	2,042	−0.03%
2007	2,313	+1.57%
2012	2,299	−0.12%
2017	2,243	−0.49%
2023	2,086	−1.20%
Source: INSEE

== See also ==
- Communes of the Eure-et-Loir department
