= Montcorbon =

Commune in Loiret, France

- Part of Douchy-Montcorbon
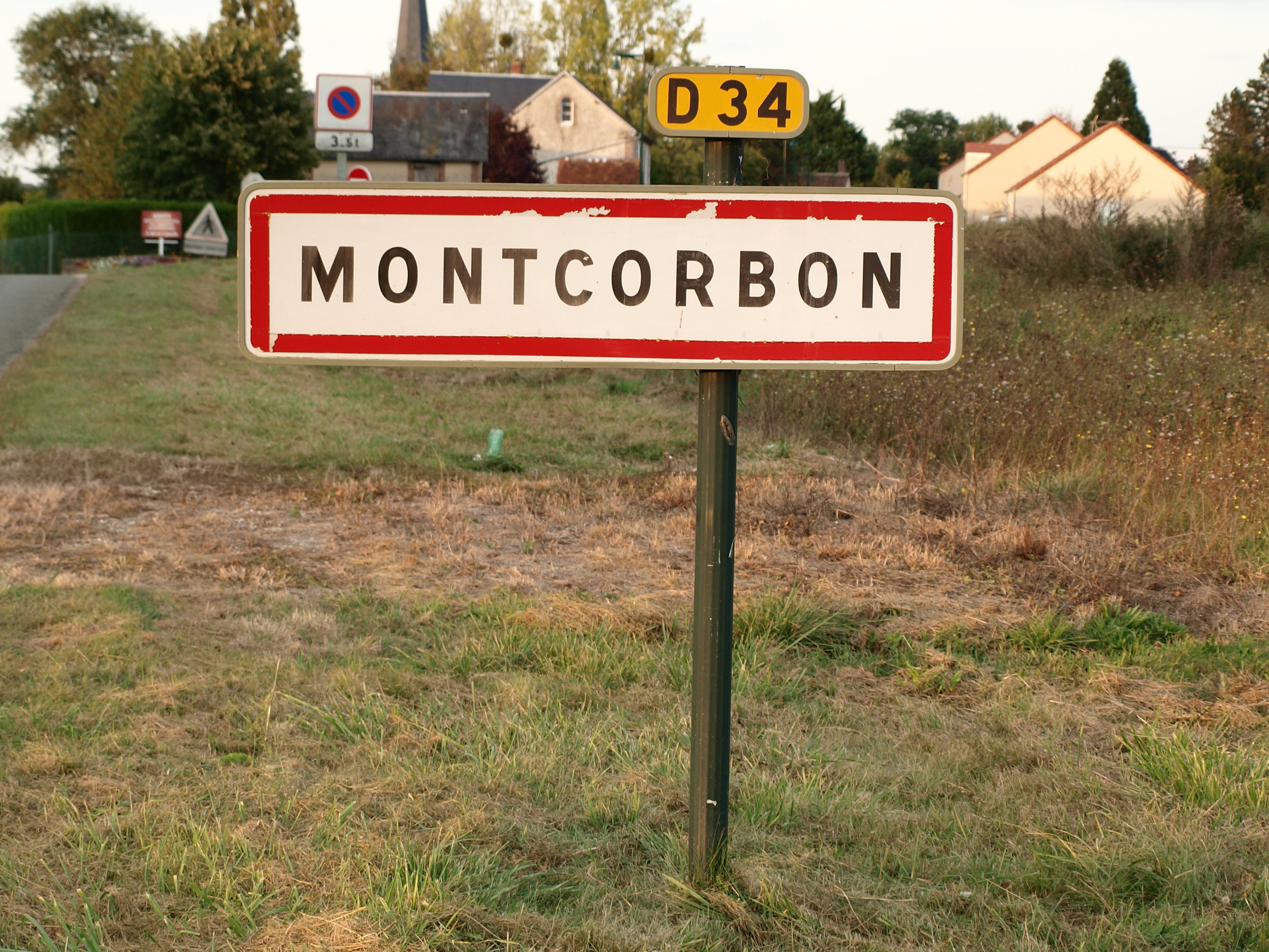
- A roadsign, entering Montcorbon

- Coat of arms
- Location of Montcorbon
- Location within France Location within Centre-Val de Loire
- Coordinates: 47°58′09″N 3°04′13″E
- Country: France
- Region: Centre-Val de Loire
- Department: Loiret
- Arrondissement: Montargis
- Canton: Courtenay
- Commune: Douchy-Montcorbon
- Area^{1}: 26.61 km^{2} (10.27 sq mi)
- Highest elevation: 199 m (653 ft)
- Lowest elevation: 144 m (472 ft)
- Population (2018): 462
  - Density: 17.4/km^{2} (45.0/sq mi)
- Time zone: UTC+01:00 (CET)
  - Summer (DST): UTC+02:00 (CEST)
- Postal code: 45220
- ^{1} French Land Register data, which excludes lakes, ponds, glaciers > 1 km^{2} (0.386 sq mi or 247 acres) and river estuaries.

Montcorbon (French pronunciation: [mɔ̃kɔʁbɔ̃]) is a former commune in the Loiret department in north-central France. On 1 January 2016, it was merged into the new commune of Douchy-Montcorbon.

== See also ==
- Communes of the Loiret department
