= Malicorne, Yonne =

Malicorne
- Part of Charny-Orée-de-Puisaye
- Location of Malicorne
- Location within France Location within Bourgogne-Franche-Comté
- Coordinates: 47°49′20″N 3°06′10″E
- Country: France
- Region: Bourgogne-Franche-Comté
- Department: Yonne
- Arrondissement: Auxerre
- Canton: Charny Orée de Puisaye
- Commune: Charny-Orée-de-Puisaye
- Area^{1}: 15.91 km^{2} (6.14 sq mi)
- Highest elevation: 195 m (640 ft)
- Lowest elevation: 145 m (476 ft)
- Population (2022): 167
  - Density: 10.5/km^{2} (27.2/sq mi)
- Time zone: UTC+01:00 (CET)
  - Summer (DST): UTC+02:00 (CEST)
- Postal code: 89120
- ^{1} French Land Register data, which excludes lakes, ponds, glaciers > 1 km^{2} (0.386 sq mi or 247 acres) and river estuaries.

Malicorne (French pronunciation: [malikɔʁn]) is a former commune in the Yonne department in Bourgogne-Franche-Comté, north-central France. On 1 January 2016, it was merged into the new commune of Charny-Orée-de-Puisaye.

== Geography ==
The village lies on the right bank of the Branlin, which flows northward through the commune before its confluence with the Ouanne at Saint-Martin-sur-Ouanne. The river Ouanne makes up most of the commune's north-eastern border.

== See also ==
- Communes of the Yonne department
