= Ouanne (river) =

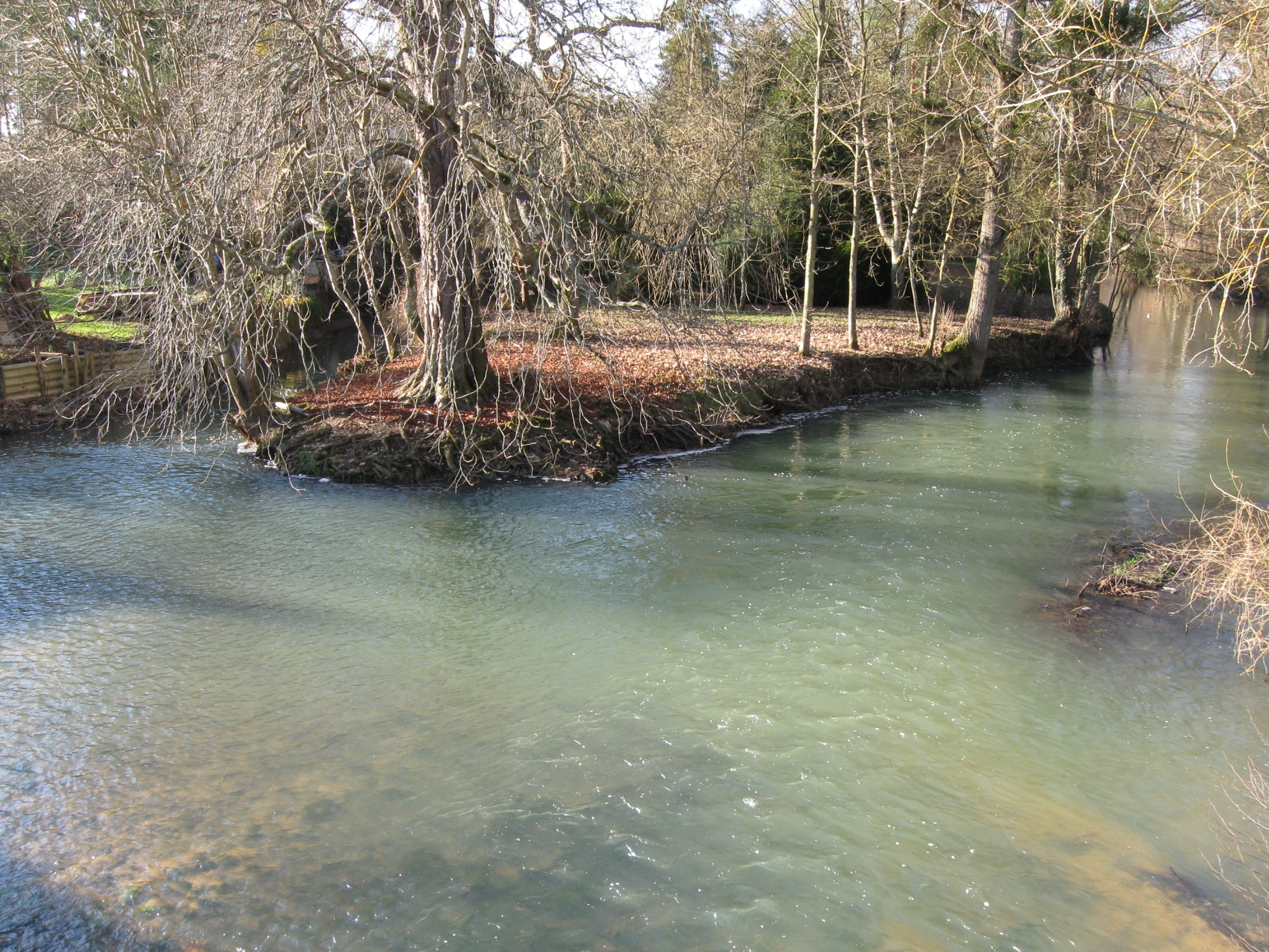
- The Ouanne at Saint-Germain-des-Prés.

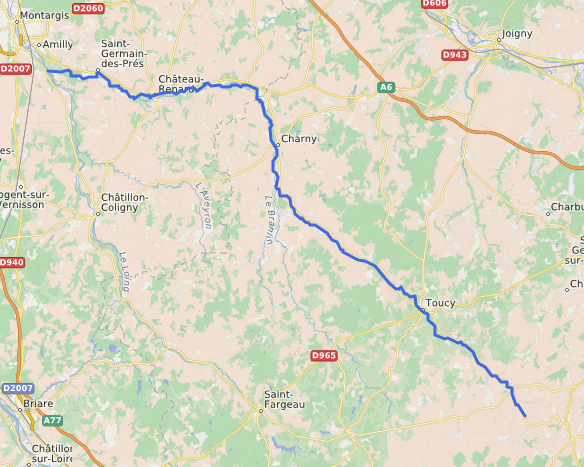

Location
- Country: France

Physical characteristics
- Source
  - location: Burgundy
- Mouth
  - location: Loing
  - coordinates: 47°57′12″N 2°46′50″E
- Length: 84 km (52 mi)
- Basin size: 950 km^{2} (370 sq mi)
- Discharge
  - average: 4.8 m^{3}/s (170 cu ft/s)

Basin features
- Progression: Loing→ Seine→ English Channel

The Ouanne (French pronunciation: [wan]) is an 84 km (52 mi) long river in central France, a right tributary of the Loing.

Its source is near the small town of Ouanne, about 20 km (12 mi) southwest of Auxerre. It flows generally northwest, and joins the Loing in Conflans-sur-Loing, near Amilly.

It crosses the following departments and towns:

- Yonne: Ouanne, Leugny, Moulins-sur-Ouanne, Toucy, Dracy, Villiers-Saint-Benoît, Grandchamp, Saint-Denis-sur-Ouanne, Malicorne, Saint-Martin-sur-Ouanne, Charny, Chêne-Arnoult
- Loiret: Douchy, Triguères, Château-Renard, Gy-les-Nonains, Saint-Germain-des-Prés, Conflans-sur-Loing
