= Charny-Orée-de-Puisaye =

- Commune
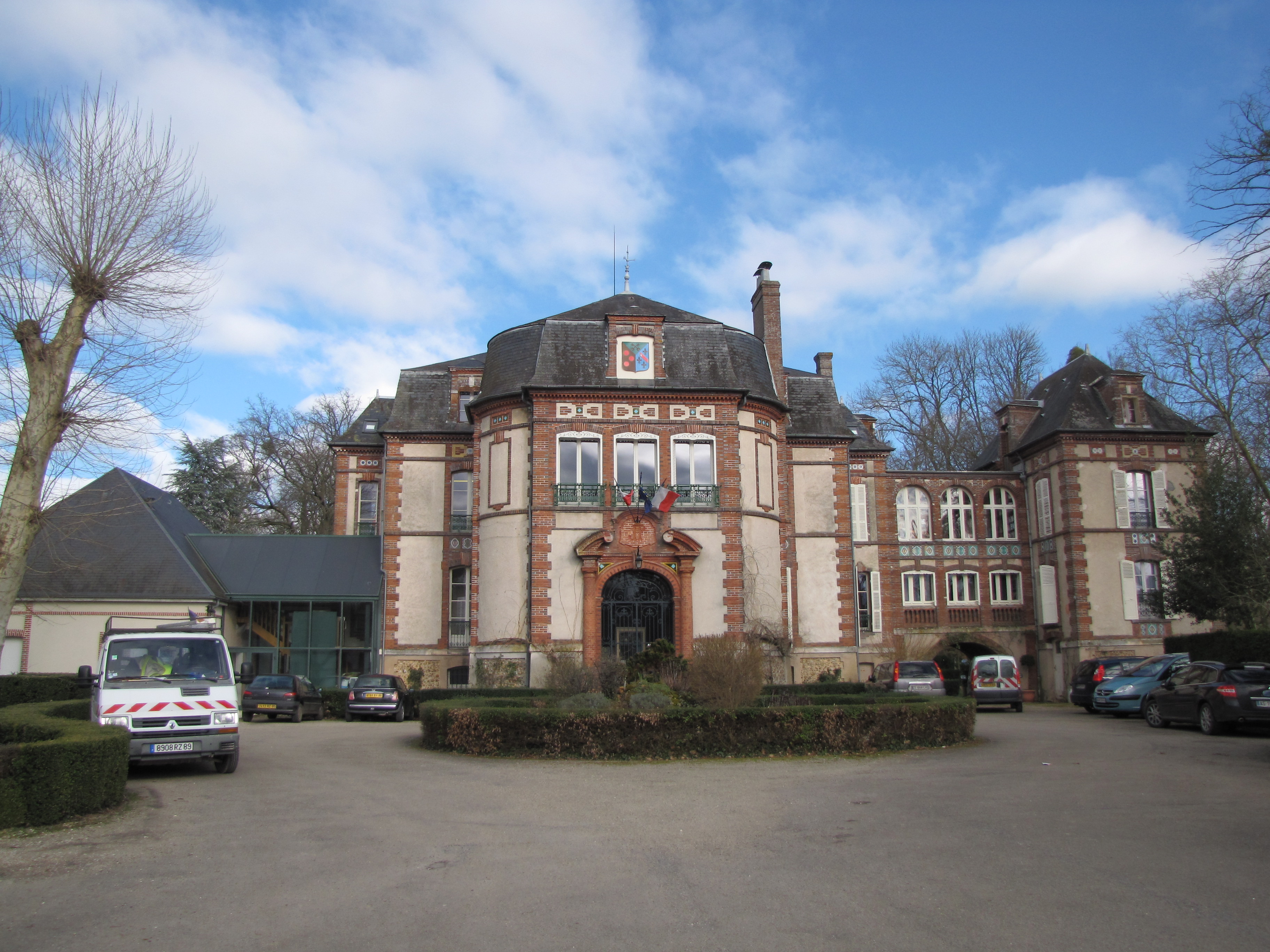
- The town hall in Charny

- Coat of arms
- Location of Charny-Orée-de-Puisaye
- Location within France Location within Bourgogne-Franche-Comté
- Coordinates: 47°53′10″N 3°05′42″E
- Country: France
- Region: Bourgogne-Franche-Comté
- Department: Yonne
- Arrondissement: Auxerre
- Canton: Charny Orée de Puisaye

Government
  - Mayor (2020–2026): Élodie Ménard
- Area^{1}: 230.40 km^{2} (88.96 sq mi)
- Population (2023): 4,900
  - Density: 21/km^{2} (55/sq mi)
- Time zone: UTC+01:00 (CET)
  - Summer (DST): UTC+02:00 (CEST)
- INSEE/Postal code: 89086 /89120
- ^{1} French Land Register data, which excludes lakes, ponds, glaciers > 1 km^{2} (0.386 sq mi or 247 acres) and river estuaries.

Charny-Orée-de-Puisaye (French pronunciation: [ʃaʁni ɔʁe də pɥizɛ]) is a commune in the Yonne department of central France, on the Northern end of the historical region of Puisaye. The municipality was established on 1 January 2016 by merger of the former communes of Charny, Chambeugle, Chêne-Arnoult, Chevillon, Dicy, Fontenouilles, Grandchamp, Malicorne, Marchais-Beton, Perreux, Prunoy, Saint-Denis-sur-Ouanne, Saint-Martin-sur-Ouanne and Villefranche.

== Population ==
Population data refer to the commune in its geography as of January 2025.

Historical population
Year	Pop.	±% p.a.
1968	5,356	—
1975	5,015	−0.94%
1982	4,812	−0.59%
1990	4,790	−0.06%
1999	4,974	+0.42%
2007	5,162	+0.46%
2012	5,153	−0.03%
2017	4,877	−1.09%
2023	4,900	+0.08%
Source: INSEE

== See also ==
- Communes of the Yonne department
