= Chambeugle =

- Part of Charny-Orée-de-Puisaye
- Location of Chambeugle
- Location within France Location within Bourgogne-Franche-Comté
- Coordinates: 47°51′40″N 3°02′30″E
- Country: France
- Region: Bourgogne-Franche-Comté
- Department: Yonne
- Arrondissement: Auxerre
- Canton: Charny Orée de Puisaye
- Commune: Charny-Orée-de-Puisaye
- Area^{1}: 7.28 km^{2} (2.81 sq mi)
- Highest elevation: 203 m (666 ft)
- Lowest elevation: 156 m (512 ft)
- Population (2022): 59
  - Density: 8.1/km^{2} (21/sq mi)
- Time zone: UTC+01:00 (CET)
  - Summer (DST): UTC+02:00 (CEST)
- Postal code: 89120
- ^{1} French Land Register data, which excludes lakes, ponds, glaciers > 1 km^{2} (0.386 sq mi or 247 acres) and river estuaries.

Chambeugle (French pronunciation: [ʃɑ̃bœɡl]) is a former commune in the Yonne department in Bourgogne-Franche-Comté in north-central France. On 1 January 2016, it was merged into the new commune of Charny-Orée-de-Puisaye.

== See also ==
- Communes of the Yonne department
