= Douchy, Loiret =

Douchy
- Part of Douchy-Montcorbon
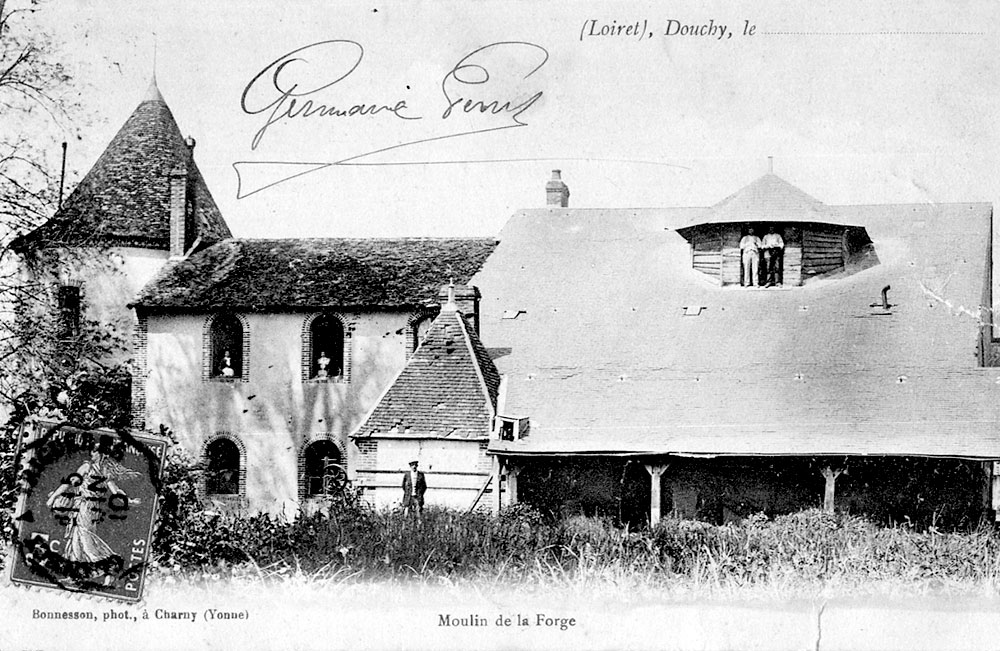
- An old view of the mill in Douchy

- Coat of arms
- Location of Douchy
- Location within France Location within Centre-Val de Loire
- Coordinates: 47°56′35″N 3°03′12″E
- Country: France
- Region: Centre-Val de Loire
- Department: Loiret
- Arrondissement: Montargis
- Canton: Courtenay
- Commune: Douchy-Montcorbon
- Area^{1}: 23.51 km^{2} (9.08 sq mi)
- Highest elevation: 190 m (620 ft)
- Lowest elevation: 121 m (397 ft)
- Population (2018): 910
  - Density: 39/km^{2} (100/sq mi)
- Demonym: Douchyssois
- Time zone: UTC+01:00 (CET)
  - Summer (DST): UTC+02:00 (CEST)
- Postal code: 45220
- ^{1} French Land Register data, which excludes lakes, ponds, glaciers > 1 km^{2} (0.386 sq mi or 247 acres) and river estuaries.

Douchy (French pronunciation: [duʃi]) is a former commune in the Loiret department in north-central France. On 1 January 2016, it was merged into the new commune of Douchy-Montcorbon.

== Geography ==
The commune is traversed by the river Ouanne.

== Notable people ==
- Alain Delon, French actor and businessman, lived in Douchy for a large part of the year from 1971 until his death in 2024.
- Mireille Darc, French model and actress, also lived in Douchy when she was Alain Delon's longtime companion.

== See also ==
- Communes of the Loiret department
