= Prunoy =

- Part of Charny-Orée-de-Puisaye
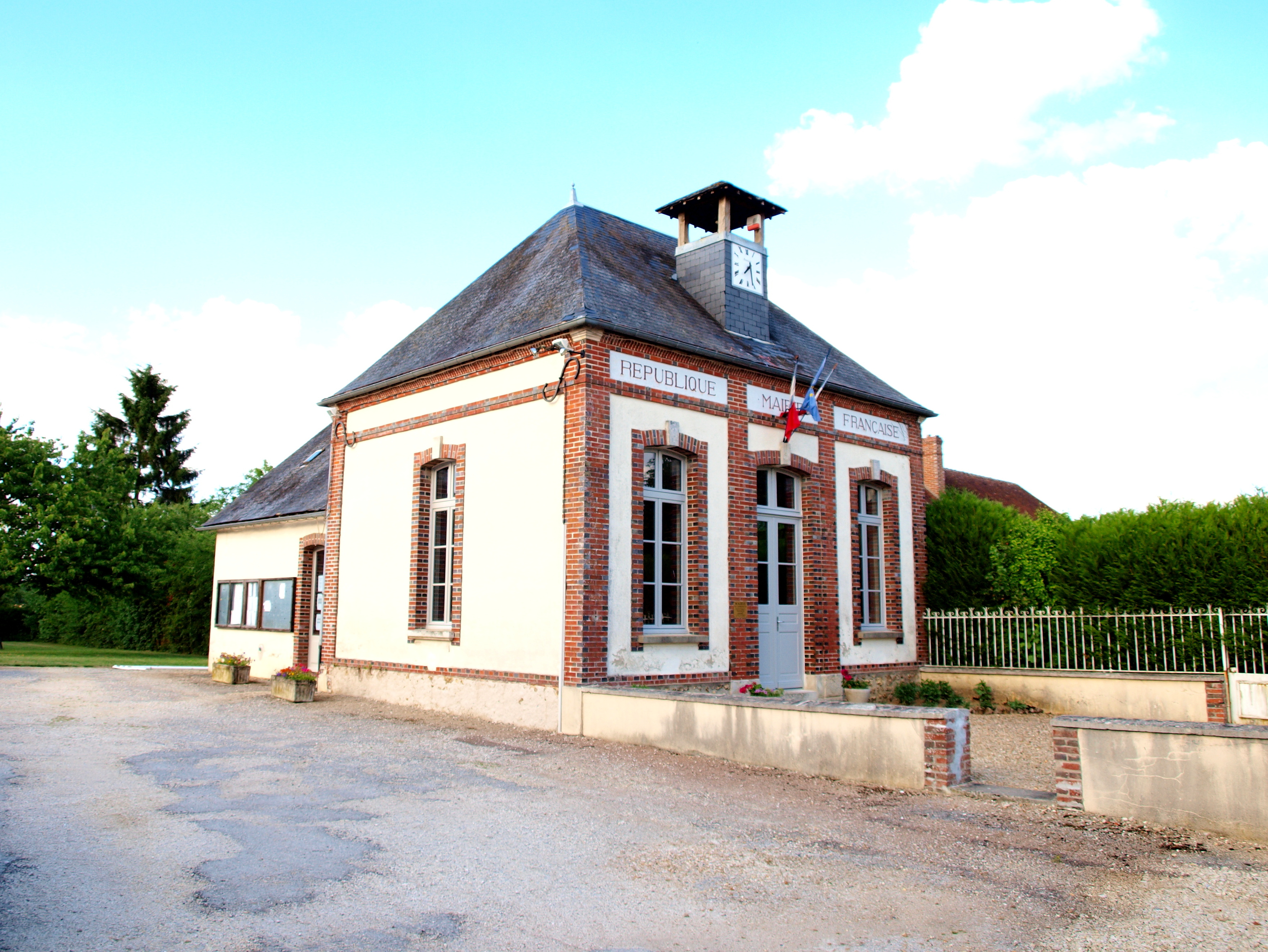
- Prunoy Town hall
- Location of Prunoy
- Location within France Location within Bourgogne-Franche-Comté
- Coordinates: 47°54′51″N 3°07′50″E
- Country: France
- Region: Bourgogne-Franche-Comté
- Department: Yonne
- Arrondissement: Auxerre
- Canton: Charny Orée de Puisaye
- Commune: Charny-Orée-de-Puisaye
- Area^{1}: 24.89 km^{2} (9.61 sq mi)
- Highest elevation: 212 m (696 ft)
- Lowest elevation: 137 m (449 ft)
- Population (2022): 285
  - Density: 11.5/km^{2} (29.7/sq mi)
- Time zone: UTC+01:00 (CET)
  - Summer (DST): UTC+02:00 (CEST)
- Postal code: 89120
- ^{1} French Land Register data, which excludes lakes, ponds, glaciers > 1 km^{2} (0.386 sq mi or 247 acres) and river estuaries.

Prunoy (French pronunciation: [pʁynwa]) is a former commune in the Yonne department in Bourgogne-Franche-Comté in north-central France. On 1 January 2016, it was merged into the new commune of Charny-Orée-de-Puisaye.

The Château de Prunoy (former Château de Vienne) is a listed monument in the south of Prunoy. The Film Death of a Corrupt Man was shot on this property.

== See also ==
- Communes of the Yonne department
