= La Benâte =

- Part of Essouvert
- Location of La Benâte
- Location within France Location within Nouvelle-Aquitaine
- Coordinates: 46°00′47″N 0°34′14″W
- Country: France
- Region: Nouvelle-Aquitaine
- Department: Charente-Maritime
- Arrondissement: Saint-Jean-d'Angély
- Canton: Saint-Jean-d'Angély
- Commune: Essouvert
- Area^{1}: 11.07 km^{2} (4.27 sq mi)
- Elevation: 67 m (220 ft)
- Highest elevation: 109 m (358 ft)
- Lowest elevation: 38 m (125 ft)
- Population (2023): 354
  - Density: 32.0/km^{2} (82.8/sq mi)
- Time zone: UTC+01:00 (CET)
  - Summer (DST): UTC+02:00 (CEST)
- Postal code: 17400
- ^{1} French Land Register data, which excludes lakes, ponds, glaciers > 1 km^{2} (0.386 sq mi or 247 acres) and river estuaries.

La Benâte (French pronunciation: [la bənat]) is a former commune in the Charente-Maritime department in the Nouvelle-Aquitaine region in southwestern France. On 1 January 2016, it was merged into the new commune Essouvert.

== See also ==
- Communes of the Charente-Maritime department
