= Leugny, Yonne =

Leugny
- Commune
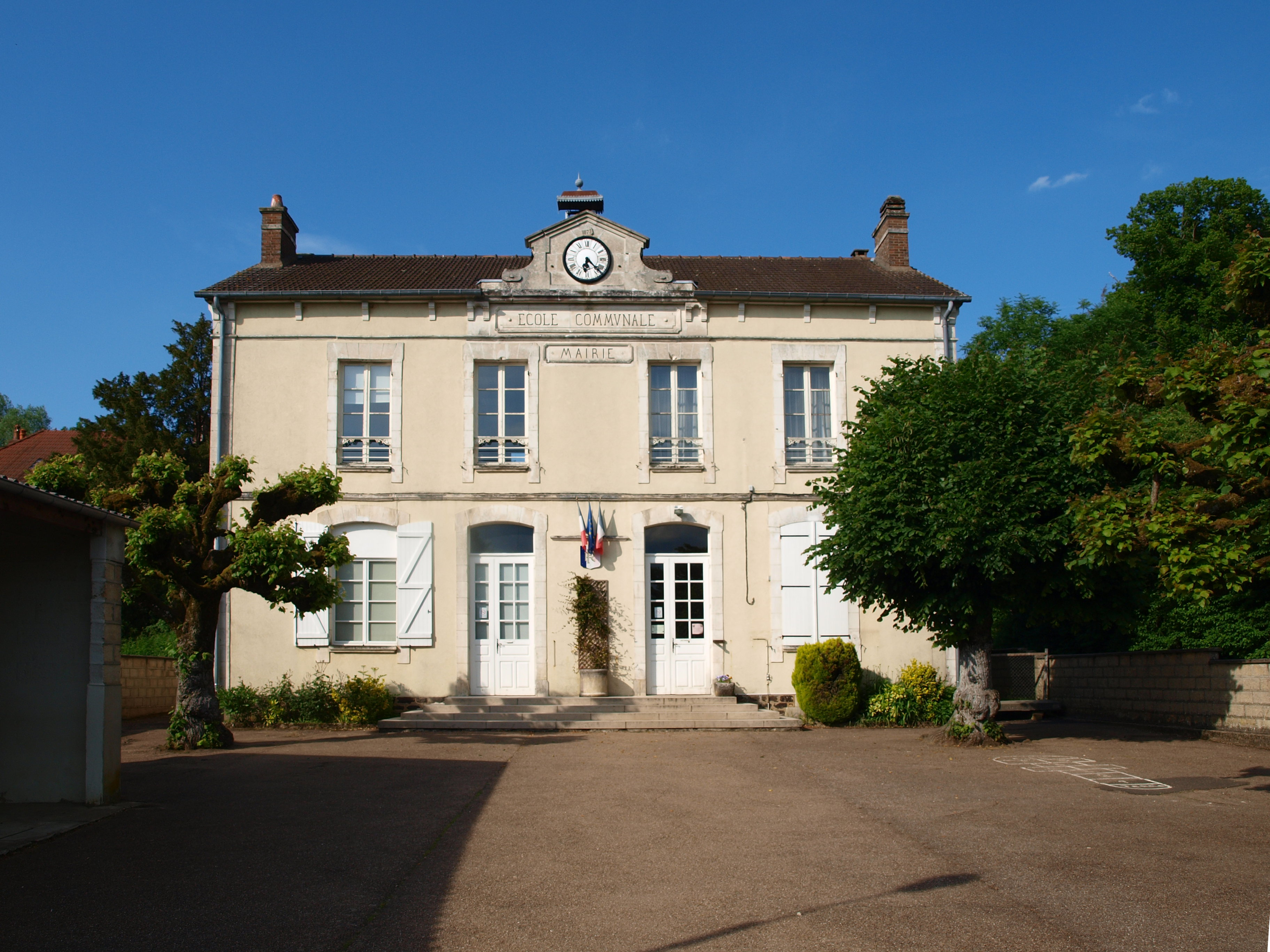
- The town hall in Leugny
- Location of Leugny
- Location within France Location within Bourgogne-Franche-Comté
- Coordinates: 47°41′05″N 3°22′33″E
- Country: France
- Region: Bourgogne-Franche-Comté
- Department: Yonne
- Arrondissement: Auxerre
- Canton: Cœur de Puisaye

Government
  - Mayor (2020–2026): Gilles Abry
- Area^{1}: 13.34 km^{2} (5.15 sq mi)
- Highest elevation: 299 m (981 ft)
- Lowest elevation: 209 m (686 ft)
- Population (2023): 315
  - Density: 23.6/km^{2} (61.2/sq mi)
- Time zone: UTC+01:00 (CET)
  - Summer (DST): UTC+02:00 (CEST)
- INSEE/Postal code: 89221 /89130
- ^{1} French Land Register data, which excludes lakes, ponds, glaciers > 1 km^{2} (0.386 sq mi or 247 acres) and river estuaries.

Leugny (French pronunciation: [lœɲi]) is a commune in the Yonne department in Bourgogne-Franche-Comté in north-central France.

== Geography ==
The village lies in the middle of the commune, on the banks of the river Ouanne, which flows northwestward through the commune.

== See also ==
- Communes of the Yonne department
