= Moulins-sur-Ouanne =

- Commune
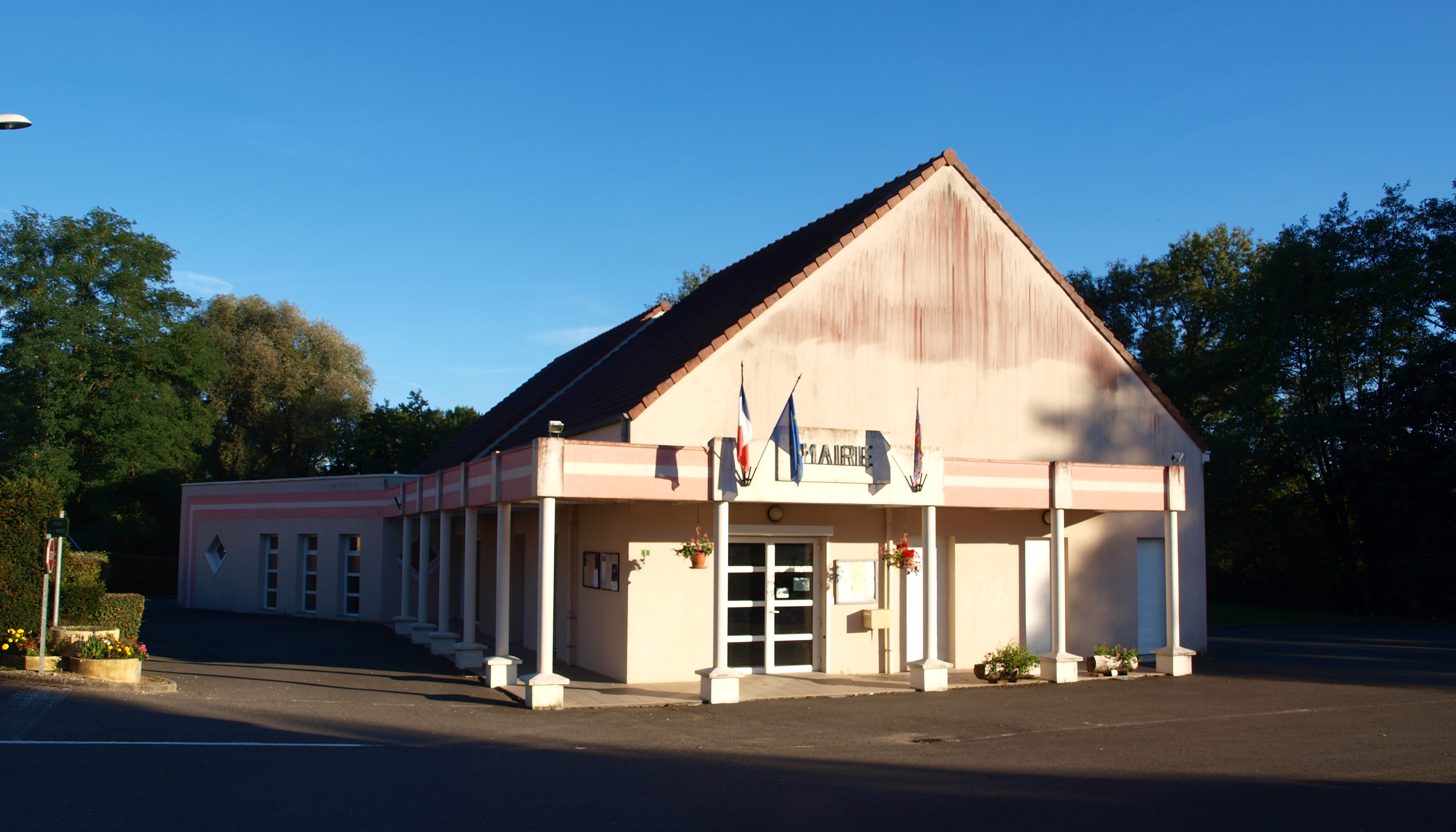
- The town hall in Moulins-sur-Ouanne

- Coat of arms
- Location of Moulins-sur-Ouanne
- Location within France Location within Bourgogne-Franche-Comté
- Coordinates: 47°42′31″N 3°20′14″E
- Country: France
- Region: Bourgogne-Franche-Comté
- Department: Yonne
- Arrondissement: Auxerre
- Canton: Cœur de Puisaye

Government
  - Mayor (2020–2026): Jean-Philippe Saulnier-Arrighi
- Area^{1}: 10.19 km^{2} (3.93 sq mi)
- Highest elevation: 293 m (961 ft)
- Lowest elevation: 194 m (636 ft)
- Population (2023): 272
  - Density: 26.7/km^{2} (69.1/sq mi)
- Time zone: UTC+01:00 (CET)
  - Summer (DST): UTC+02:00 (CEST)
- INSEE/Postal code: 89272 /89130
- ^{1} French Land Register data, which excludes lakes, ponds, glaciers > 1 km^{2} (0.386 sq mi or 247 acres) and river estuaries.

Moulins-sur-Ouanne (French pronunciation: [mulɛ̃ syʁ wan], literally Moulins on Ouanne) is a commune in the Yonne department in Bourgogne-Franche-Comté in north-central France.

== Geography ==
The village lies in the middle of the commune, on the right bank of the Ouanne, which flows northwestward through the commune.

== See also ==
- Communes of the Yonne department
