= Charny, Yonne =

Charny
- Part of Charny-Orée-de-Puisaye
- Location of Charny
- Location within France Location within Bourgogne-Franche-Comté
- Coordinates: 47°53′12″N 3°05′49″E
- Country: France
- Region: Bourgogne-Franche-Comté
- Department: Yonne
- Arrondissement: Auxerre
- Canton: Charny Orée de Puisaye
- Commune: Charny-Orée-de-Puisaye
- Area^{1}: 18.99 km^{2} (7.33 sq mi)
- Highest elevation: 201 m (659 ft)
- Lowest elevation: 130 m (430 ft)
- Population (2022): 1,497
  - Density: 78.83/km^{2} (204.2/sq mi)
- Time zone: UTC+01:00 (CET)
  - Summer (DST): UTC+02:00 (CEST)
- Postal code: 89120
- ^{1} French Land Register data, which excludes lakes, ponds, glaciers > 1 km^{2} (0.386 sq mi or 247 acres) and river estuaries.

Charny (French pronunciation: [ʃaʁni]) is a former commune in the Yonne department in Bourgogne-Franche-Comté in north-central France. On 1 January 2016, it was merged into the new commune of Charny-Orée-de-Puisaye.

== Geography ==
The village lies in the middle of the commune, on the right bank of the river Ouanne, which flows north through the commune.

== History ==
Charny has been inhabited since the prehistoric period (traces of cut and polished flint have been found in the area). Two historical sites from the Carolingian era still exist : Frécambault and Cocico.

The name of Charny, originally “Caarnetum”, appears on a deed of gift dating from 1130 in Les Echarlis Abbey. The moated château of Charny belonged to the Courtenay family and was located close to the church.

The town's heyday would have been during the time of Mahaut d'Artois – the new chatelaine in 1303 (at the time, there were approximately 2000 inhabitants). The lazar house (a place to quarantine people affected by leprosy) and surrounding defensive walls were also constructed during the same period. Mahaut d'Artois embellished the old castle and restored the town. In 1309, King Philippe le Bel was received by Charny.

A second castle, previously known as the “Clos”, used to guard the bridges of the river Ouanne. The watchtower, which still stands today and is called the “Haute Cave”, was built to protect the town in the West.

In 1358 France was invaded by Robert Knowles' troops, but Charny - faithful to the King of France – managed to resist.

However, the town was taken over six times in a row by the Bourguignons and the Armagnacs between 1426 and 1443 – it was completely destroyed and burnt down. After the Hundred Years' War, the town was totally destroyed and remained empty for half a century.

In 1653 a lady known as the “Grande Mademoiselle” (mademoiselle de Montpensier) was exiled in her château at Saint-Fargeau. She donated Charny to her half brother and this explains the presence of a fleur-de-lis on the Charny's coat of arms.

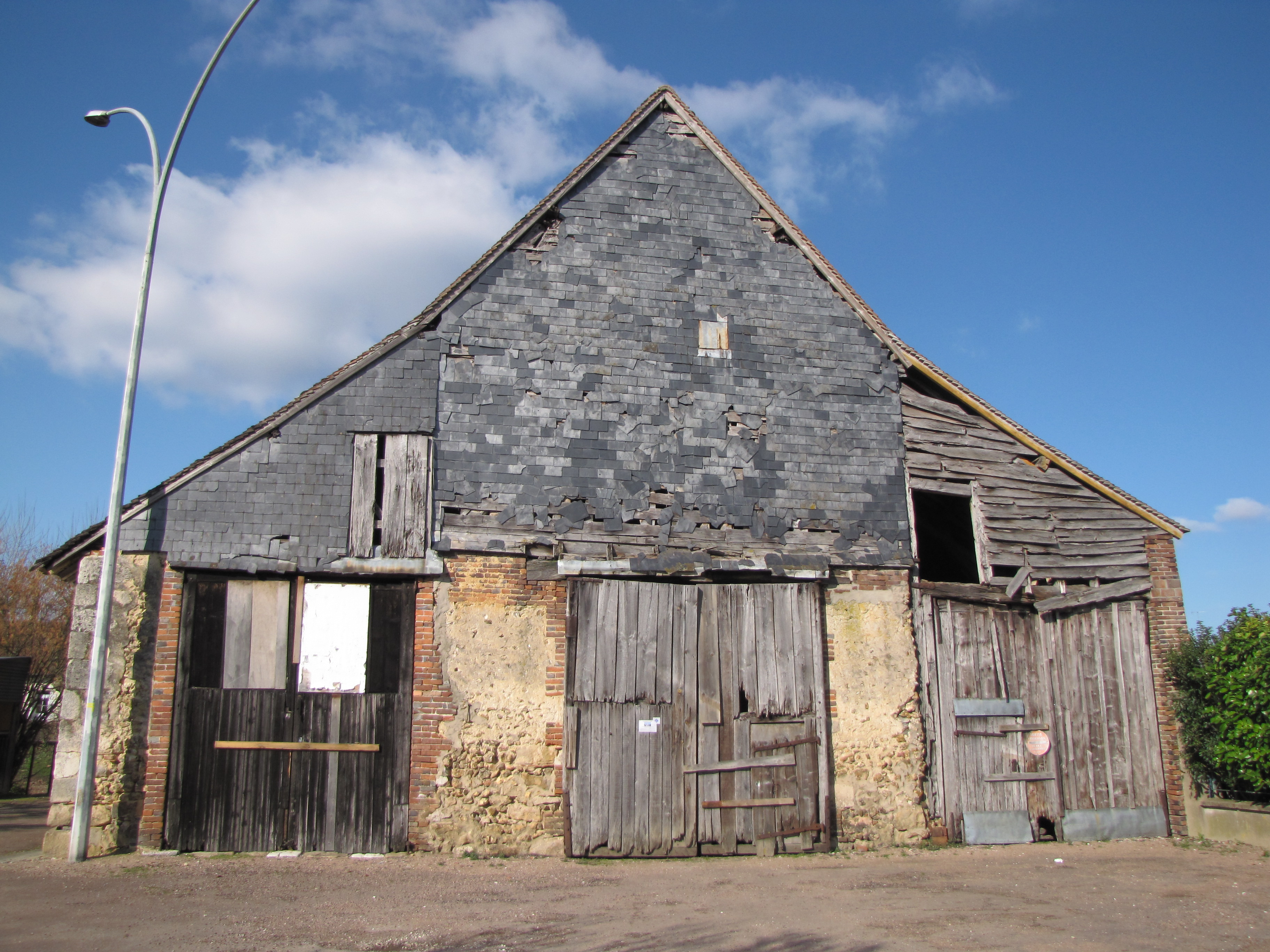
The tithe barn, in need of TLC

In 1706, a great fire destroyed part of the town – the Grange aux Dîmes (the “Tithe Barn”) and a few houses on the street “rue des Ponts” were all that remained. Towards the end of 1802, Charny became the head town of the canton. In 1840 the bridge over the River Ouanne and the Town Hall were built. In 1946 the small village “la Mothe aux Aulnaies” became a part of Charny – giving it a larger territory over the valley of the River Ouanne.

Nowadays Charny remains the head town of the canton. New communication systems and the town's proximity to Paris have enabled it to develop. Its trade and economy hold a promising future.

== Things to see ==
The church Saint Pierre de Charny, consecrated in 1738, was restored in the 19th century and has a wooden romanesque-style nave. In the rectory is a Madonna and Child dating from the fourteenth century.

The old Town Hall was built in the time of Louis Philippe in the 1830s and is situated in the town centre. It is timber-framed and the brick pilasters originate from the château of Montargis. It remained the town hall until the 1980s. Known these days as “la halle”, it is the center of the weekly market and its top floor is used for meetings and exhibitions.

Marcel Djerzinski, one of the main characters in Michel Houellebecq's novel Atomised, spends his early childhood in Charny.

To see :

•Two beautiful dormer windows built by local carpenters in the street “Grande Rue”

•the “Grange aux Dîmes” (the “Tithe Barn”)

•the remains of the old fortified wall

•the banks of the river Ouanne with its fords and bridges

•the leisure park with its fishing lake, fitness trail, climbing wall and picnic areas...

•the present-day Town Hall used to be an elegant château with a small park and trees which are hundreds of years old. The town is alive, busy, with all sorts of shops and celebrations throughout the year (the summer fair, the shopkeepers market in July and the Saint Simon fair in October).

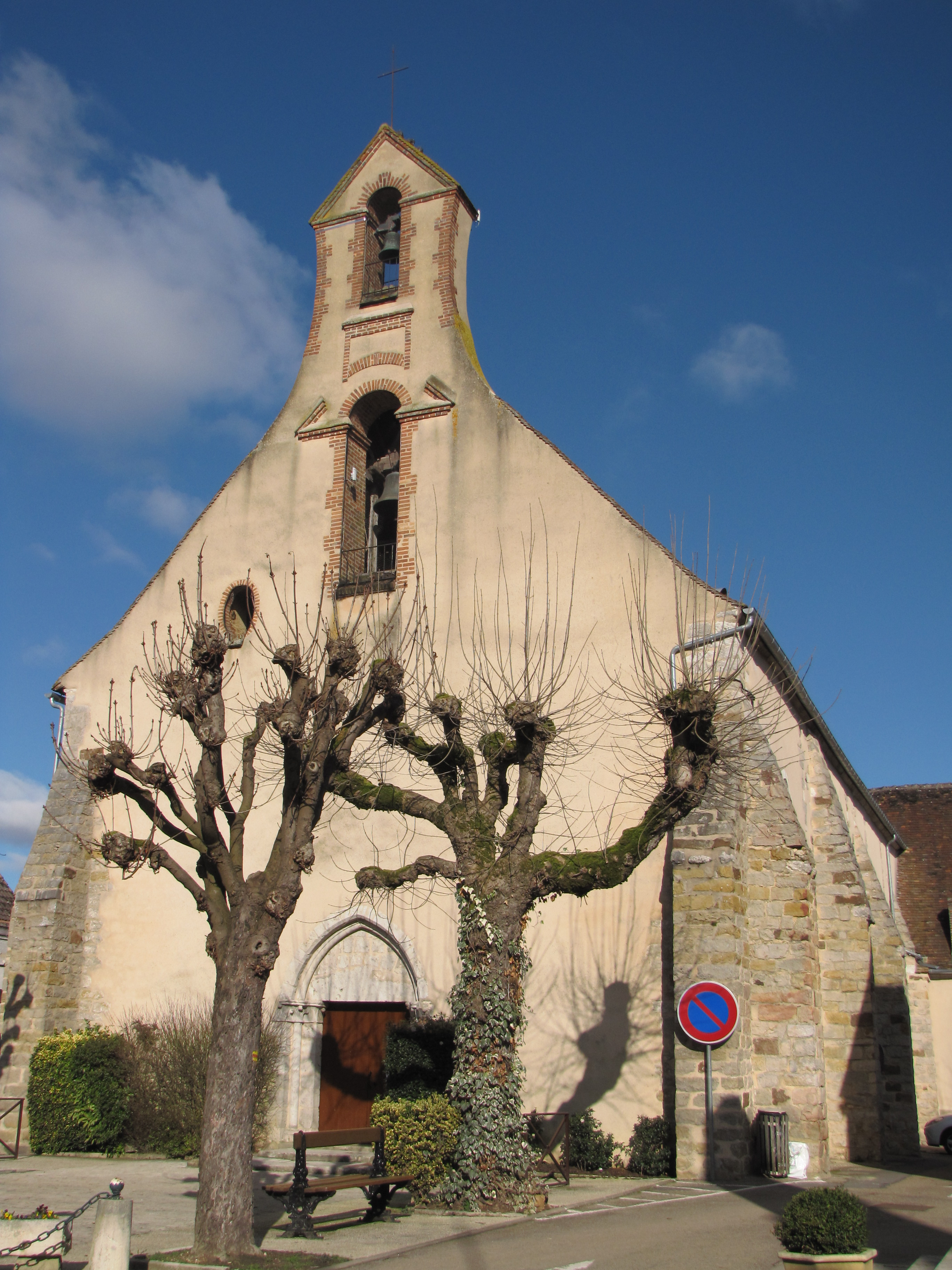
Saint-Piere church

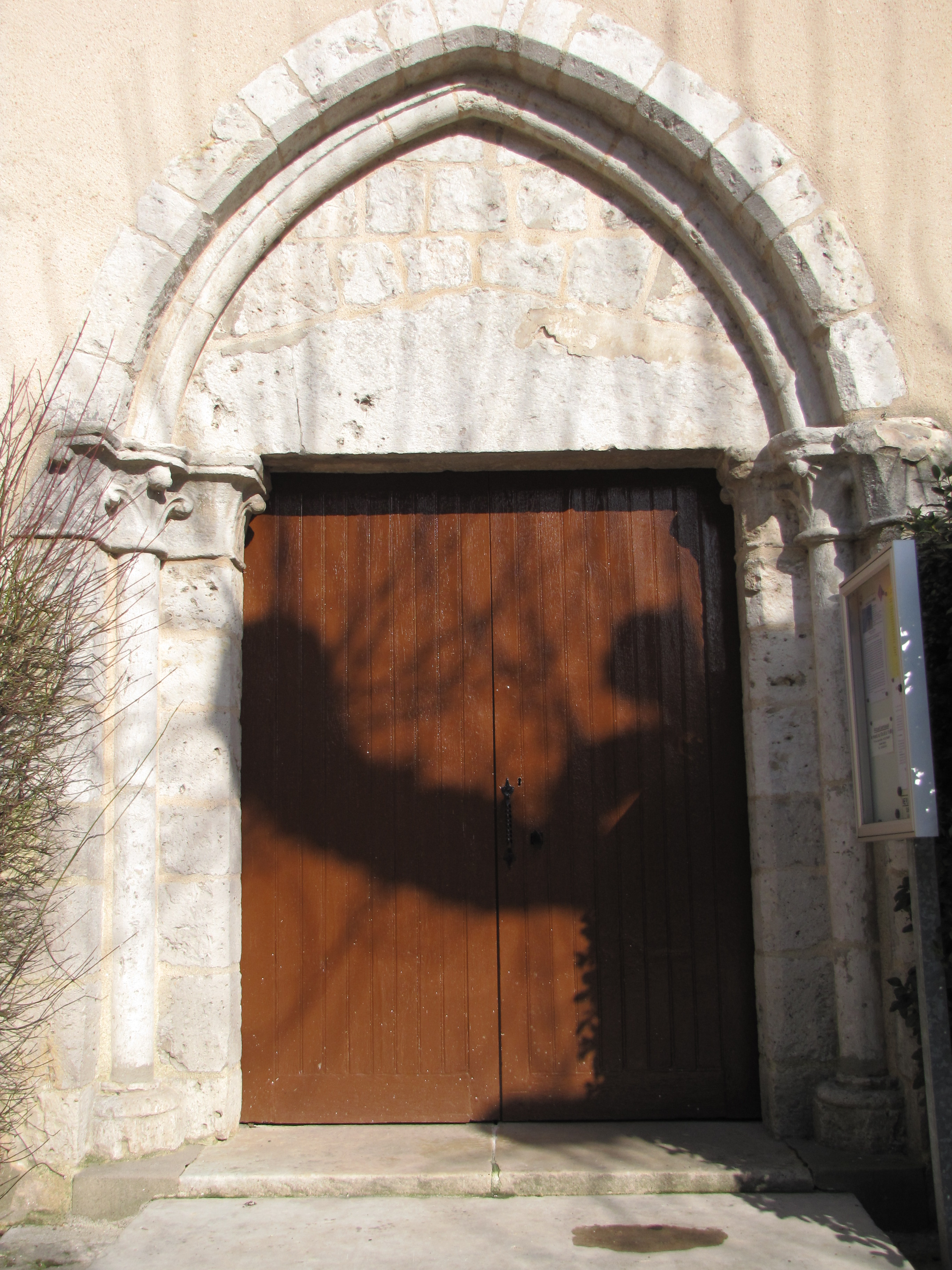
the church porch

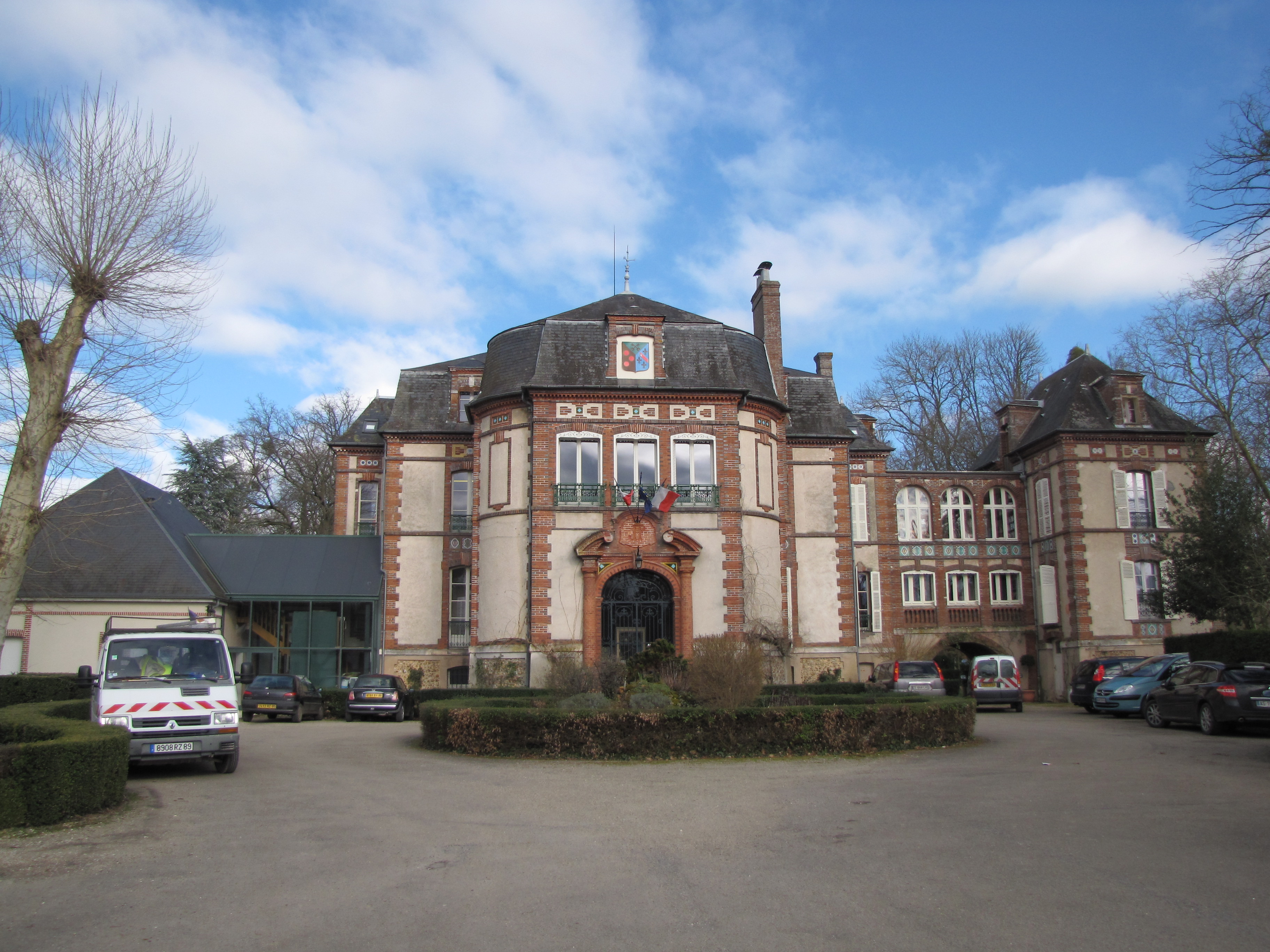
The Jacot castle,
town hall since the 80's

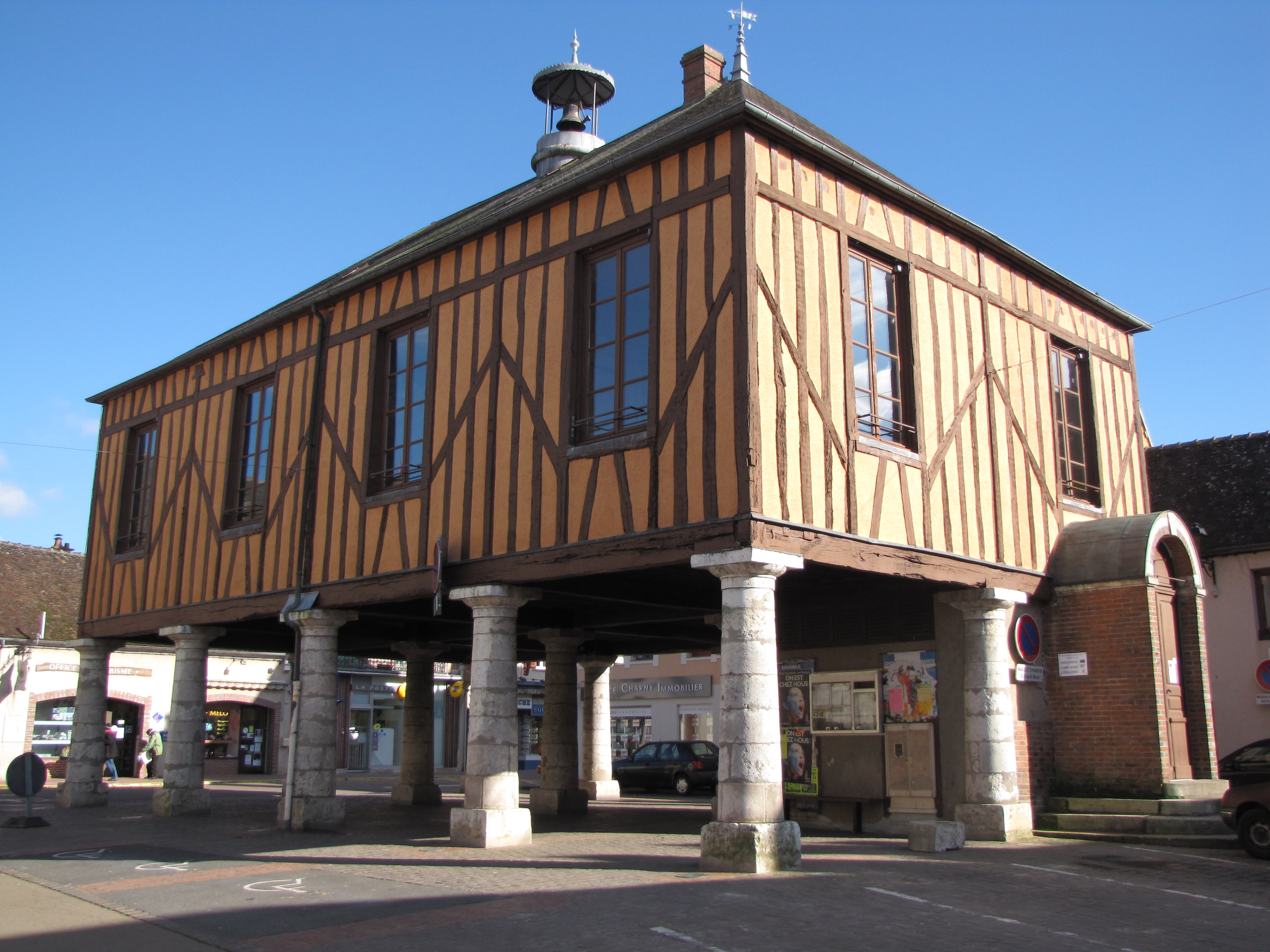
The market “halle”

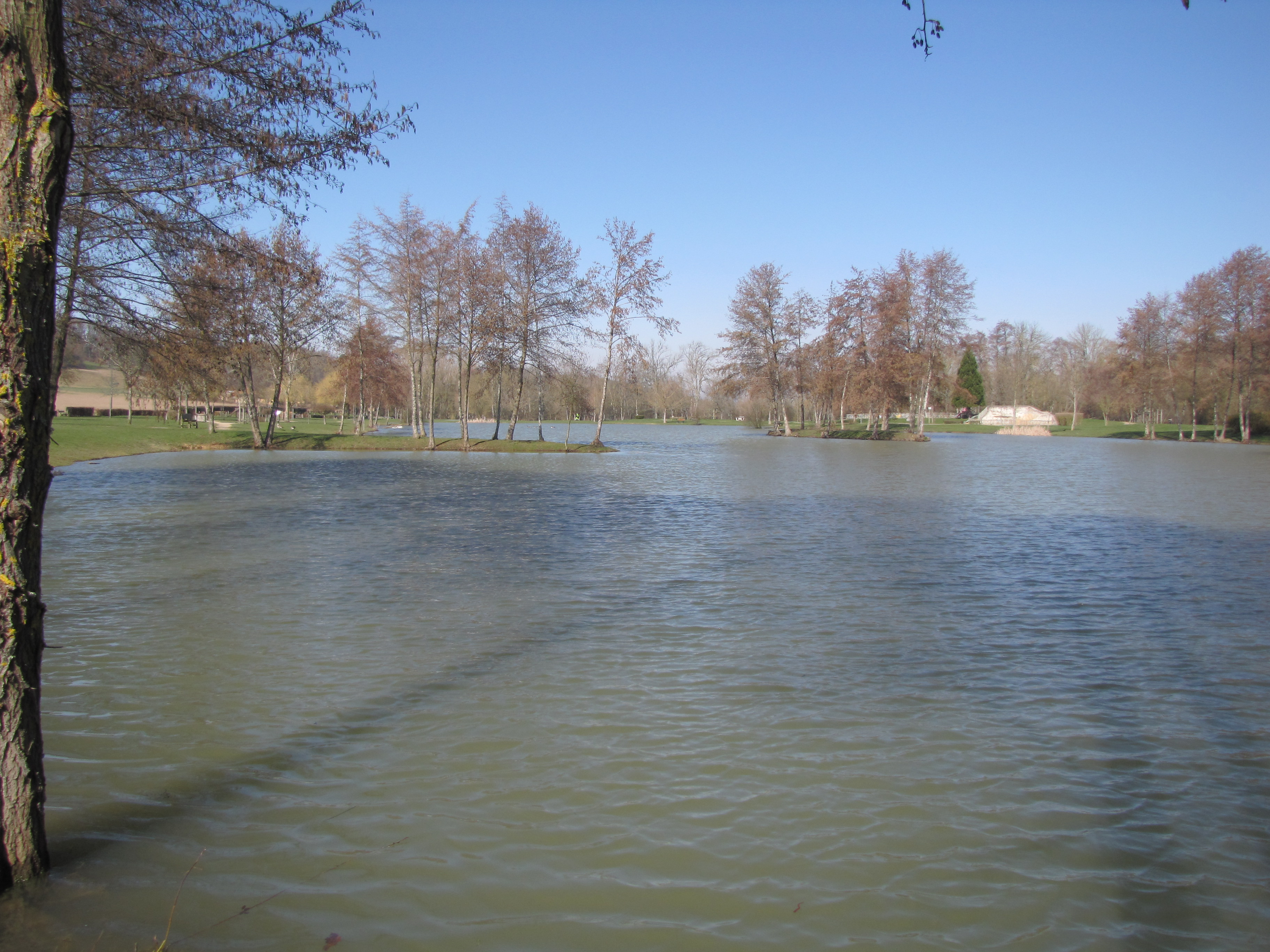
Leisure lake in high waters (March's seasonal floodings)

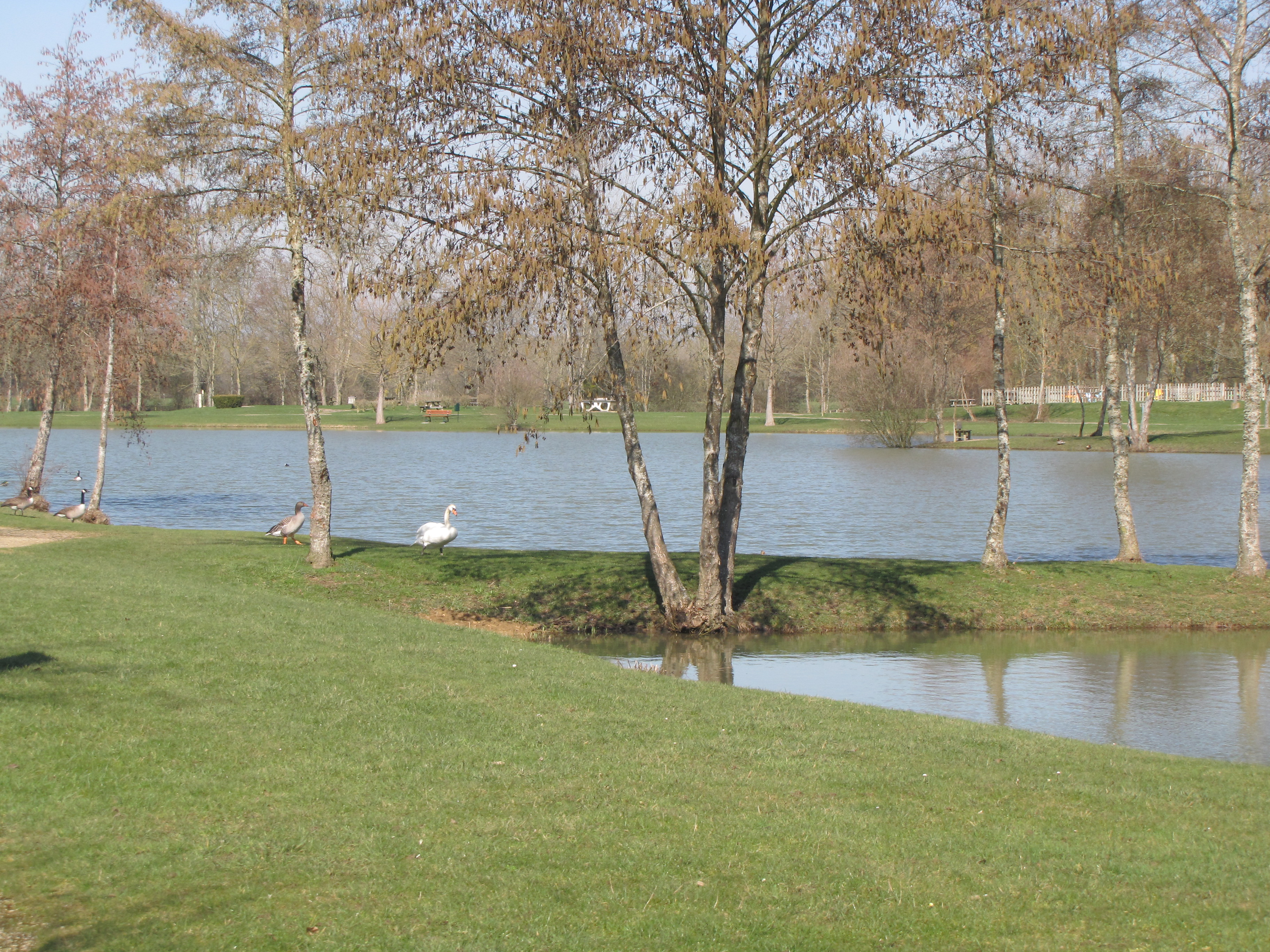
Geese and swan at the leisure lake

== See also ==
- Communes of the Yonne department
