= Chêne-Arnoult =

Former comune in Bourgogne-Franche-Comté, France

- Part of Charny-Orée-de-Puisaye
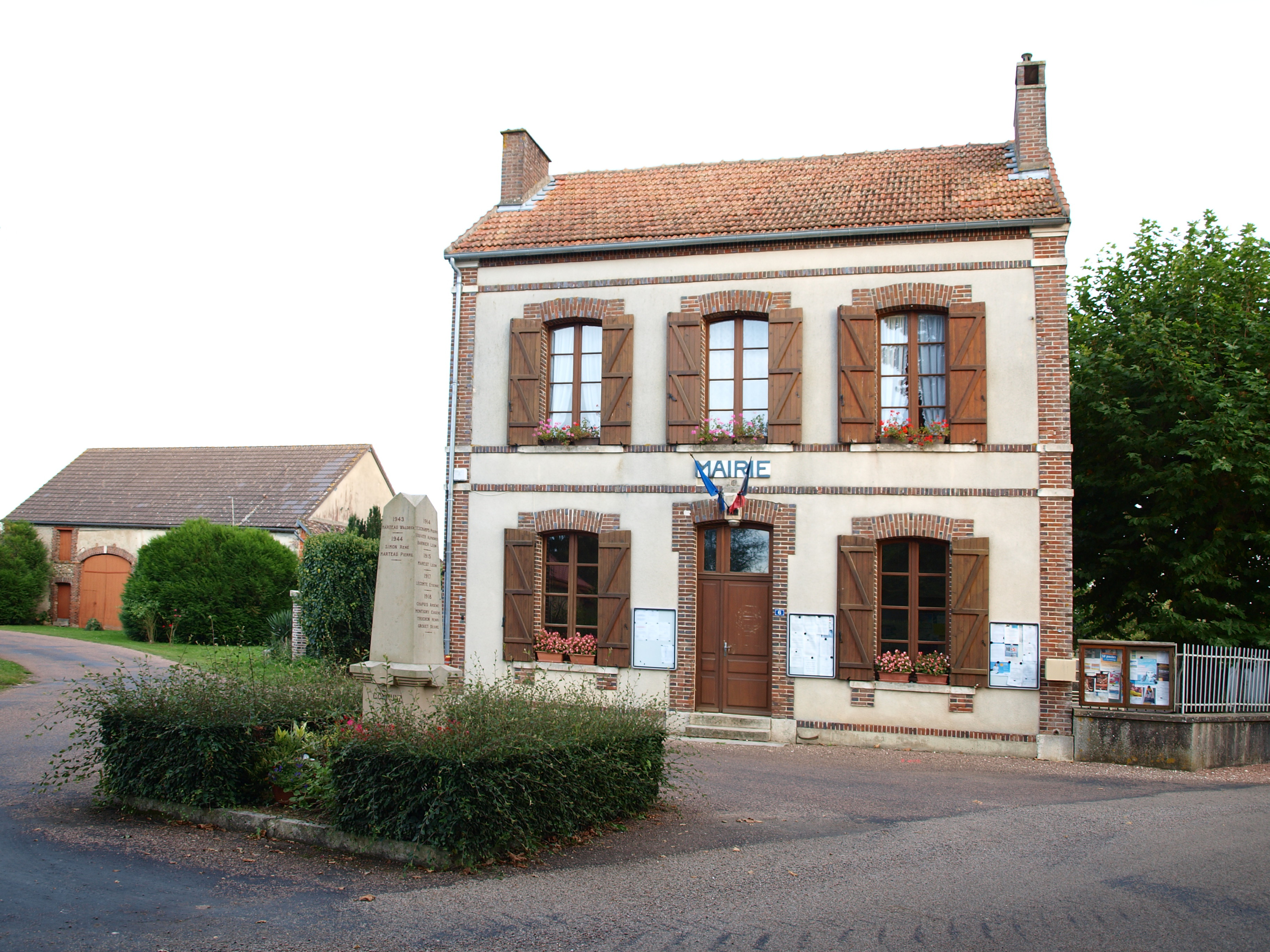
- Town hall
- Location of Chêne-Arnoult
- Location within France Location within Bourgogne-Franche-Comté
- Coordinates: 47°54′09″N 3°04′12″E
- Country: France
- Region: Bourgogne-Franche-Comté
- Department: Yonne
- Arrondissement: Auxerre
- Canton: Charny Orée de Puisaye
- Commune: Charny-Orée-de-Puisaye
- Area^{1}: 9.10 km^{2} (3.51 sq mi)
- Highest elevation: 188 m (617 ft)
- Lowest elevation: 126 m (413 ft)
- Population (2022): 112
  - Density: 12.3/km^{2} (31.9/sq mi)
- Time zone: UTC+01:00 (CET)
  - Summer (DST): UTC+02:00 (CEST)
- Postal code: 89120
- ^{1} French Land Register data, which excludes lakes, ponds, glaciers > 1 km^{2} (0.386 sq mi or 247 acres) and river estuaries.

Chêne-Arnoult (French pronunciation: [ʃɛn aʁnu]) is a former commune in the Yonne department in Bourgogne-Franche-Comté in north-central France. On 1 January 2016, it was merged into the new commune of Charny-Orée-de-Puisaye.

== Geography ==
The Ouanne forms the commune's north-eastern border.

== See also ==
- Communes of the Yonne department
