= Saint-Martin-sur-Ouanne =

- Part of Charny-Orée-de-Puisaye
- Location of Saint-Martin-sur-Ouanne
- Location within France Location within Bourgogne-Franche-Comté
- Coordinates: 47°50′27″N 3°06′19″E
- Country: France
- Region: Bourgogne-Franche-Comté
- Department: Yonne
- Arrondissement: Auxerre
- Canton: Charny Orée de Puisaye
- Commune: Charny-Orée-de-Puisaye
- Area^{1}: 15.34 km^{2} (5.92 sq mi)
- Highest elevation: 202 m (663 ft)
- Lowest elevation: 136 m (446 ft)
- Population (2022): 364
  - Density: 23.7/km^{2} (61.5/sq mi)
- Time zone: UTC+01:00 (CET)
  - Summer (DST): UTC+02:00 (CEST)
- Postal code: 89120
- ^{1} French Land Register data, which excludes lakes, ponds, glaciers > 1 km^{2} (0.386 sq mi or 247 acres) and river estuaries.

Saint-Martin-sur-Ouanne (French pronunciation: [sɛ̃ maʁtɛ̃ syʁ wan], lit. 'Saint-Martin on Ouanne') is a former commune in the Yonne department in Bourgogne-Franche-Comté in north-central France. On 1 January 2016, it was merged into the new commune of Charny-Orée-de-Puisaye.

== Geography ==
The village lies on the right bank of the Ouanne, which flows northward through the commune.

== See also ==
- Communes of the Yonne department
