= Saint-Denis-du-Pin =

- Part of Essouvert
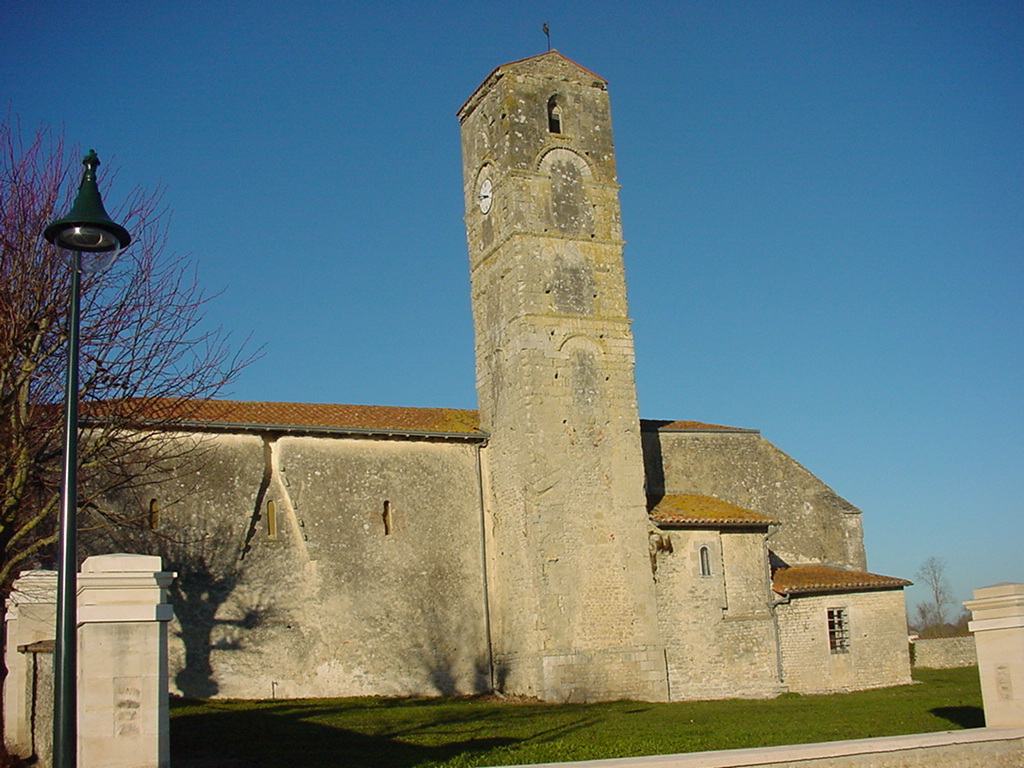
- Location of Saint-Denis-du-Pin
- Location within France Location within Nouvelle-Aquitaine
- Coordinates: 45°59′12″N 0°31′11″W
- Country: France
- Region: Nouvelle-Aquitaine
- Department: Charente-Maritime
- Arrondissement: Saint-Jean-d'Angély
- Canton: Saint-Jean-d'Angély
- Commune: Essouvert
- Area^{1}: 19.16 km^{2} (7.40 sq mi)
- Elevation: 43 m (141 ft)
- Highest elevation: 109 m (358 ft)
- Lowest elevation: 26 m (85 ft)
- Population (2023): 667
  - Density: 34.8/km^{2} (90.2/sq mi)
- Time zone: UTC+01:00 (CET)
  - Summer (DST): UTC+02:00 (CEST)
- Postal code: 17400
- ^{1} French Land Register data, which excludes lakes, ponds, glaciers > 1 km^{2} (0.386 sq mi or 247 acres) and river estuaries.

Saint-Denis-du-Pin (French pronunciation: [sɛ̃ dəni dy pɛ̃]) is a former commune in the Charente-Maritime department in southwestern France. On 1 January 2016, it was merged into the new commune Essouvert.

== See also ==
- Communes of the Charente-Maritime department
