= Saint-Denis-les-Ponts =

- Part of Saint-Denis-Lanneray
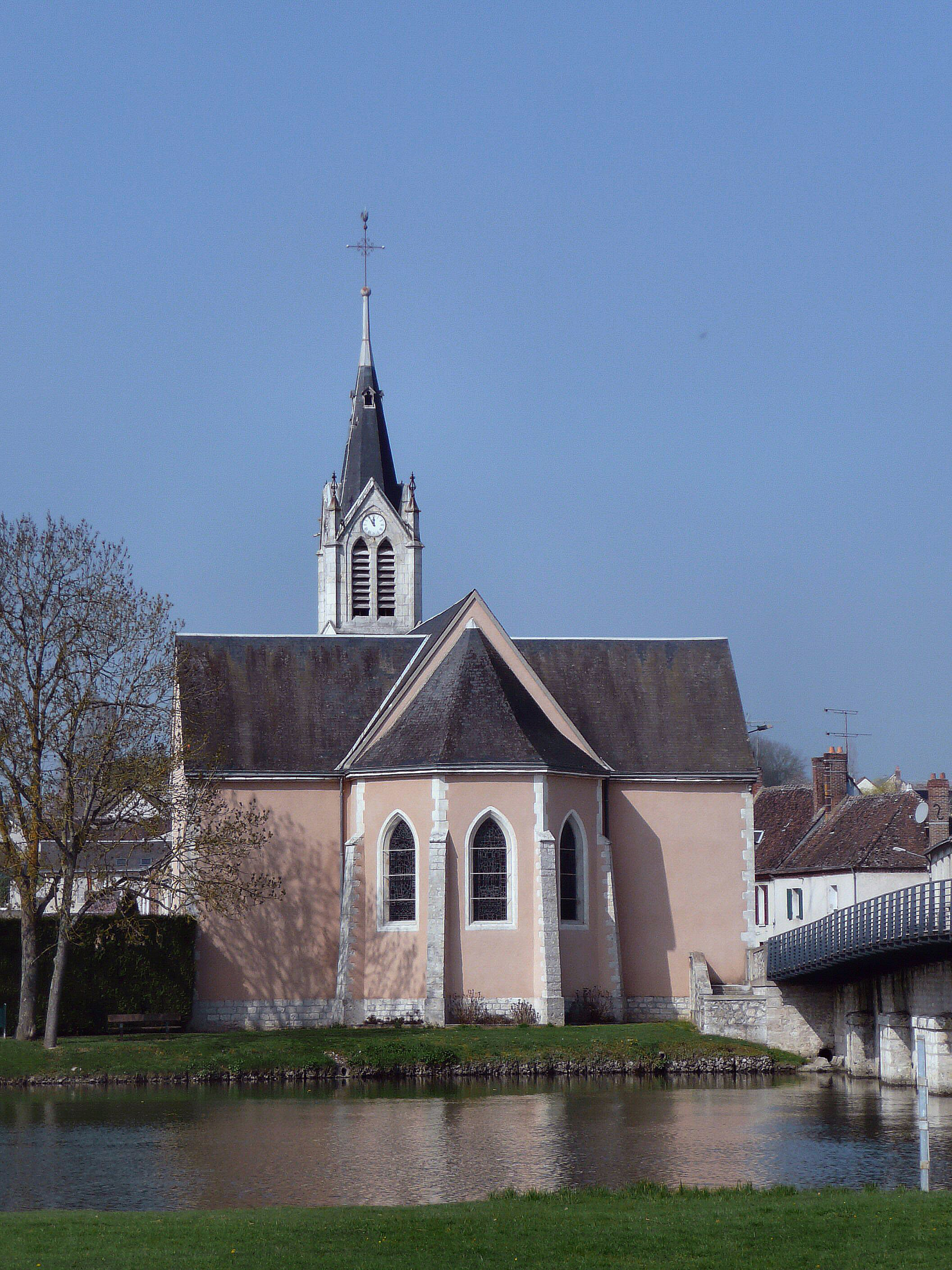
- Location of Saint-Denis-les-Ponts
- Location within France Location within Centre-Val de Loire
- Coordinates: 48°04′06″N 1°17′38″E
- Country: France
- Region: Centre-Val de Loire
- Department: Eure-et-Loir
- Arrondissement: Châteaudun
- Canton: Châteaudun
- Commune: Saint-Denis-Lanneray
- Area^{1}: 13.8 km^{2} (5.3 sq mi)
- Elevation: 124 m (407 ft)
- Highest elevation: 152 m (499 ft)
- Lowest elevation: 100 m (330 ft)
- Population (2019): 1,669
  - Density: 121/km^{2} (313/sq mi)
- Time zone: UTC+01:00 (CET)
  - Summer (DST): UTC+02:00 (CEST)
- Postal code: 28200
- ^{1} French Land Register data, which excludes lakes, ponds, glaciers > 1 km^{2} (0.386 sq mi or 247 acres) and river estuaries.

Saint-Denis-les-Ponts (French pronunciation: [sɛ̃ dəni le pɔ̃]) is a former commune in the Eure-et-Loir department in northern France. On 1 January 2019, it was merged into the new commune Saint-Denis-Lanneray.

== Population ==
Historical population

Year	Pop.	±% p.a.
1793	700	—
1800	718	+0.36%
1806	730	+0.28%
1821	891	+1.34%
1831	897	+0.07%
1836	824	−1.68%
1841	831	+0.17%
1846	942	+2.54%
1851	911	−0.67%
1856	907	−0.09%
1861	885	−0.49%
1866	886	+0.02%
1872	885	−0.02%
1876	885	+0.00%
1881	878	−0.16%
1886	831	−1.09%
1891	806	−0.61%

Year	Pop.	±% p.a.
1896	816	+0.25%
1901	835	+0.46%
1906	784	−1.25%
1911	780	−0.10%
1921	674	−1.45%
1926	662	−0.36%
1931	651	−0.33%
1936	602	−1.55%
1946	730	+1.95%
1954	771	+0.69%
1962	846	+1.17%
1968	1,008	+2.96%
1975	1,539	+6.23%
1982	1,716	+1.57%
1990	1,567	−1.13%
1999	1,544	−0.16%
2019	1,669	+0.39%

Source: EHESS and INSEE

== See also ==
- Communes of the Eure-et-Loir department
