= St Denis Church, Joondanna =

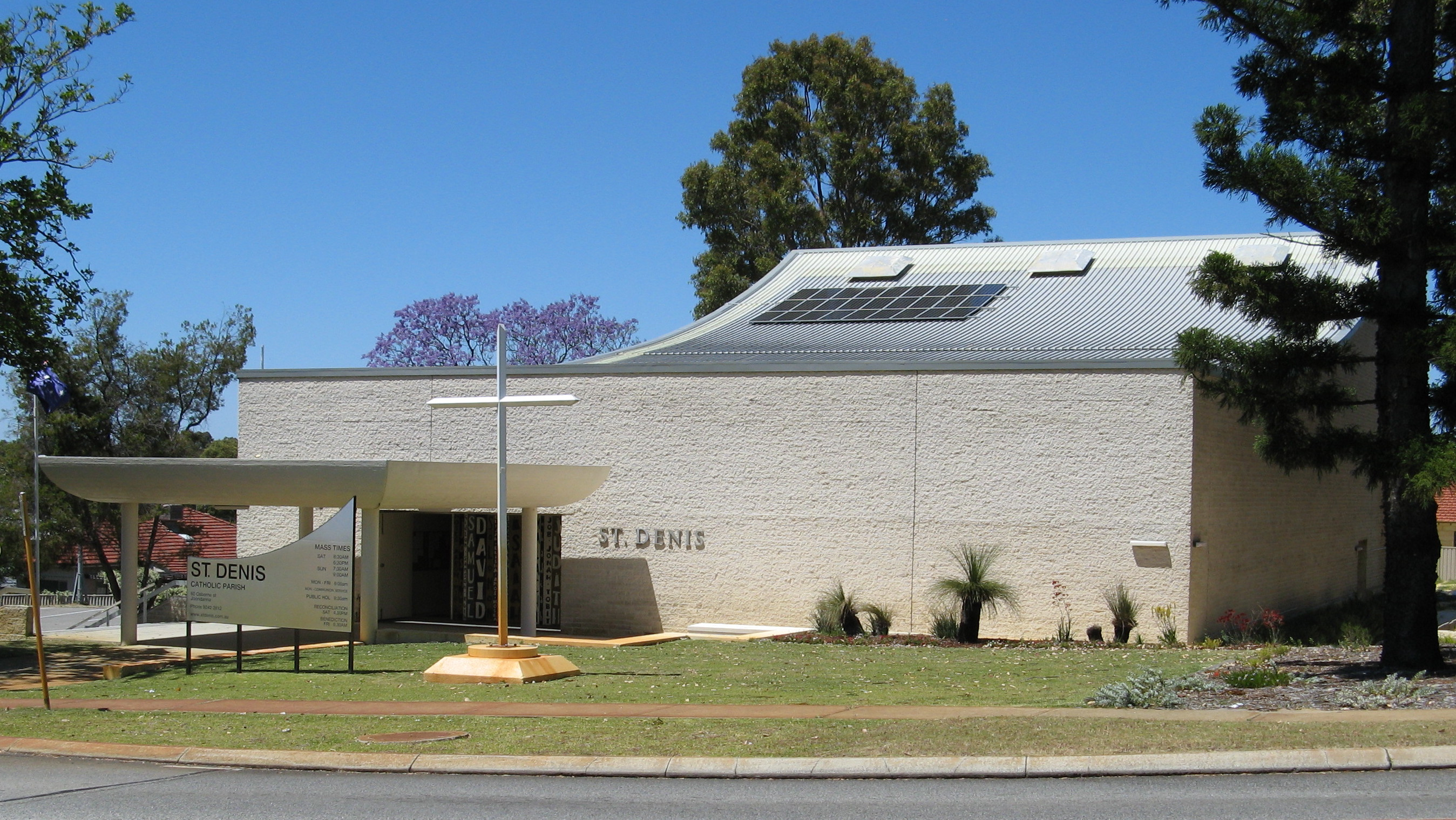
- St Denis Church, Joondanna
- 31.9082°S 115.8428°E
- Location: Joondanna, Western Australia
- Country: Australia
- Denomination: Catholic Church
- Website: www.stdenis.com.au

History
- Status: Parish church
- Dedication: Saint Denis of Paris
- Dedicated: 25 August 1968

Architecture
- Architect: Ernest Rossen
- Years built: 1967

Specifications
- Capacity: 500

Administration
- Archdiocese: Perth
- Parish: St Denis / Joondanna (Note: The Archdiocese of Perth refers to the parish as "Joondanna", but most other references call the parish "St Denis".)

Clergy
- Priest: Anthony Rathinam OSM

St Denis Church is a Roman Catholic church in the Perth suburb of Joondanna, Western Australia.

== History of the parish ==
The parish of St Denis was created by Archbishop Redmond Prendiville in 1952 by separating it from the larger parish of Osborne Park; responsibility for the new parish was given to the Servite Order, which had recently arrived in Australia. The first parish priest was Patrick Nolan. (Note: Nolan also served as the first principal of St Philip's high school when it was opened by the Servites in 1958.) At the time, the new parish's church was a Nissen or Quonset hut on Wanneroo Road in Tuart Hill (now Joondanna) consecrated the previous year, which also acted as a school. In 1964, Nolan was replaced by Christopher Ross, who decided that a "proper" church was required.

The parish was named after the third-century Christian martyr, Saint Denis.

== Design and features ==
The building was designed by Ernest Rossen and Iris Rossen, and is inspired by the Chapel du Ronchamp. It was built in 1967 and consecrated in 1968.

The church has a pipe organ. The instrument was originally built in 1957 for the chapel at St John of God Subiaco Hospital. That chapel was demolished in 1994 and the organ was removed and rebuilt at St Denis. It was damaged during a severe storm in 2010, but subsequently repaired.

In 2010-11 a five-year plan to renovate the church building commenced:

- The crying room was converted to a gathering space.
- A new sound system was installed, including hearing units for those hard-of-hearing.
- Indoor toilets were installed.
- Reverse-cycle air-conditioning was installed.
- Solar panels were installed on the roof of the church and presbytery.

In 2014 the tabernacle was moved from its original location on the side of the sanctuary to directly behind the altar. (Note: The tabernacle now behind the altar at the front of the church is not the original. The original 1968 tabernacle is now at the rear of the church in a small memorial area.)

In 2017 a memorial garden was built on the west side, between the church and the presbytery.
