= Grandchamp, Yonne =

Grandchamp
- Part of Charny-Orée-de-Puisaye
- Location of Grandchamp
- Location within France Location within Bourgogne-Franche-Comté
- Coordinates: 47°48′26″N 3°09′19″E
- Country: France
- Region: Bourgogne-Franche-Comté
- Department: Yonne
- Arrondissement: Auxerre
- Canton: Charny Orée de Puisaye
- Commune: Charny-Orée-de-Puisaye
- Area^{1}: 28.29 km^{2} (10.92 sq mi)
- Highest elevation: 224 m (735 ft)
- Lowest elevation: 153 m (502 ft)
- Population (2022): 322
  - Density: 11.4/km^{2} (29.5/sq mi)
- Time zone: UTC+01:00 (CET)
  - Summer (DST): UTC+02:00 (CEST)
- Postal code: 89350
- ^{1} French Land Register data, which excludes lakes, ponds, glaciers > 1 km^{2} (0.386 sq mi or 247 acres) and river estuaries.

Grandchamp (French pronunciation: [ɡʁɑ̃ʃɑ̃]) is a former commune in the Yonne department in Bourgogne-Franche-Comté in north-central France. On 1 January 2016, it was merged into the new commune of Charny-Orée-de-Puisaye.

== Geography ==
The village lies in the middle of the commune, on the left bank of the river Ouanne, which flows northwestward through the commune.

== See also ==
- Communes of the Yonne department
