= Lanneray =

Commune in Eure-et-Loir, France

- Part of Saint-Denis-Lanneray
- Location of Lanneray
- Location within France Location within Centre-Val de Loire
- Coordinates: 48°05′15″N 1°14′29″E
- Country: France
- Region: Centre-Val de Loire
- Department: Eure-et-Loir
- Arrondissement: Châteaudun
- Canton: Châteaudun
- Commune: Saint-Denis-Lanneray
- Area^{1}: 26.63 km^{2} (10.28 sq mi)
- Elevation: 145 m (476 ft)
- Highest elevation: 162 m (531 ft)
- Lowest elevation: 110 m (360 ft)
- Population (2019): 526
  - Density: 19.8/km^{2} (51.2/sq mi)
- Time zone: UTC+01:00 (CET)
  - Summer (DST): UTC+02:00 (CEST)
- Postal code: 28200
- ^{1} French Land Register data, which excludes lakes, ponds, glaciers > 1 km^{2} (0.386 sq mi or 247 acres) and river estuaries.

Lanneray (French pronunciation: [lanʁɛ]) is a former commune in the Eure-et-Loir department in northern France. On 1 January 2019, it was merged into the new commune Saint-Denis-Lanneray.

== Population ==
Historical population
| Year | Pop. | ±% p.a. |
|---|---|---|
| 1962 | 591 | — |
| 1968 | 505 | −2.59% |
| 1975 | 447 | −1.73% |
| 1982 | 485 | +1.17% |
| 1990 | 481 | −0.10% |
| 1999 | 498 | +0.39% |
| 2006 | 518 | +0.56% |
| 2019 | 526 | +0.12% |
Source: EHESS and INSEE

== See also ==
- Communes of the Eure-et-Loir department
