= Arrondissement of Auxerre =

Coordinates: 47.7986°N 3.5672°E

Auxerre
- Arrondissement
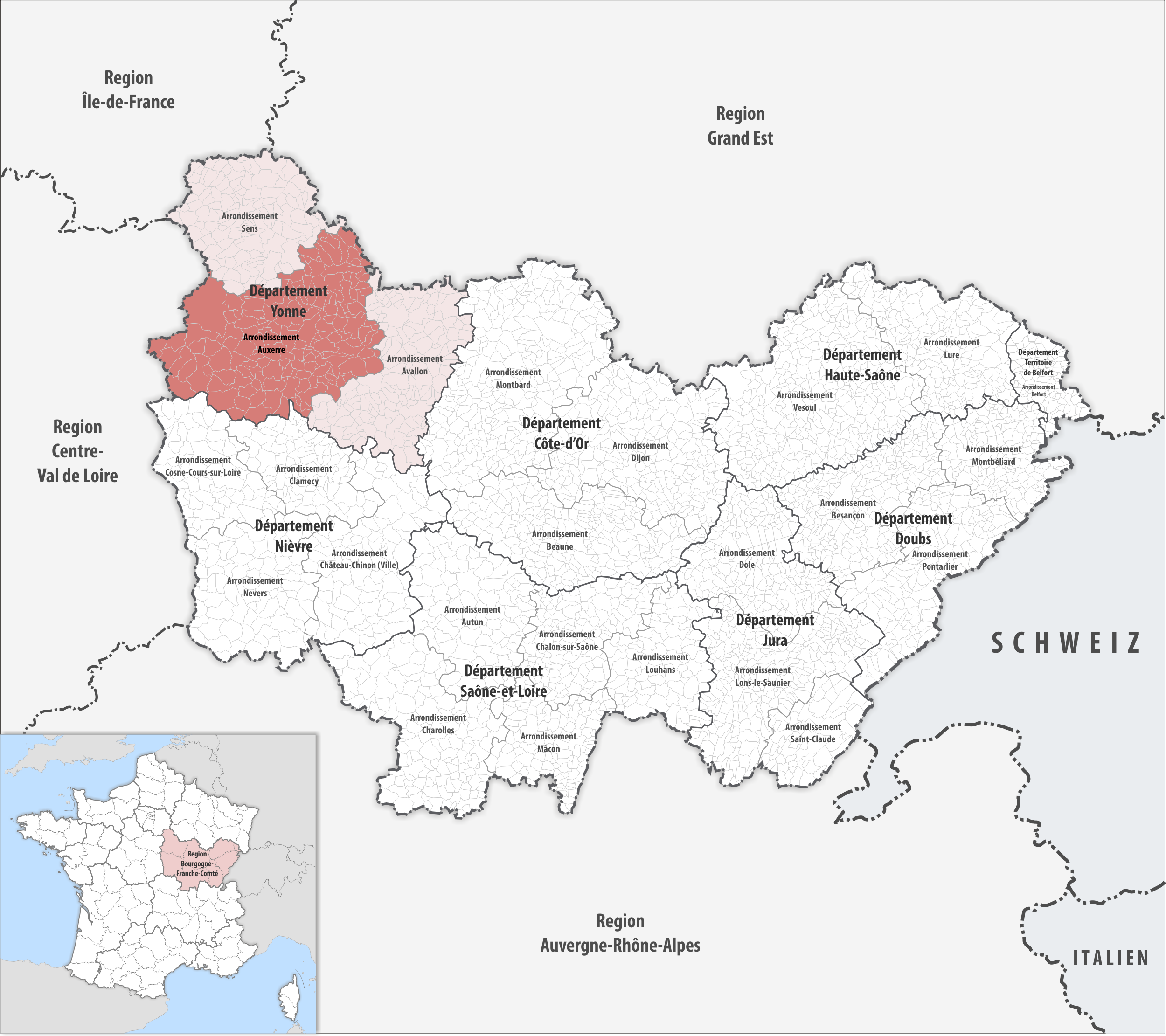
- Location within the region Bourgogne-Franche-Comté
- Country: France
- Region: Bourgogne-Franche-Comté
- Department: Yonne
- No. of communes: {{{nbcomm}}}
- Area: 3,431.8 km^{2} (1,325.0 sq mi)
- Population (2023): 160,968
  - Density: 46.905/km^{2} (121.48/sq mi)
- INSEE code: 891

The arrondissement of Auxerre is an arrondissement of France in the Yonne department in the Bourgogne-Franche-Comté region. It has 170 communes. Its population is 161,976 (2021), and its area is 3,431.8 km^{2} (1,325.0 sq mi).

== Composition ==
The communes of the arrondissement of Auxerre, and their INSEE codes, are:

1. Aigremont (89002)
2. Andryes (89007)
3. Appoigny (89013)
4. Augy (89023)
5. Auxerre (89024)
6. Bassou (89029)
7. Bazarnes (89030)
8. Beaumont (89031)
9. Beauvoir (89033)
10. Beine (89034)
11. Bellechaume (89035)
12. Béru (89039)
13. Bessy-sur-Cure (89040)
14. Beugnon (89041)
15. Bleigny-le-Carreau (89045)
16. Bléneau (89046)
17. Bonnard (89050)
18. Branches (89053)
19. Brienon-sur-Armançon (89055)
20. Butteaux (89061)
21. Carisey (89062)
22. Chablis (89068)
23. Chailley (89069)
24. Champcevrais (89072)
25. Champignelles (89073)
26. Champlost (89076)
27. Champs-sur-Yonne (89077)
28. La Chapelle-Vaupelteigne (89081)
29. Charbuy (89083)
30. Charentenay (89084)
31. Charmoy (89085)
32. Charny-Orée-de-Puisaye (89086)
33. Chassy (89088)
34. Chemilly-sur-Serein (89095)
35. Chemilly-sur-Yonne (89096)
36. Cheny (89099)
37. Chéu (89101)
38. Chevannes (89102)
39. Chichery (89105)
40. Chichée (89104)
41. Chitry (89108)
42. Coulangeron (89117)
43. Coulanges-la-Vineuse (89118)
44. Coulanges-sur-Yonne (89119)
45. Courgis (89123)
46. Courson-les-Carrières (89125)
47. Crain (89129)
48. Deux Rivières (89130)
49. Diges (89139)
50. Dracy (89147)
51. Druyes-les-Belles-Fontaines (89148)
52. Égleny (89150)
53. Épineau-les-Voves (89152)
54. Escamps (89154)
55. Escolives-Sainte-Camille (89155)
56. Esnon (89156)
57. Étais-la-Sauvin (89158)
58. La Ferté-Loupière (89163)
59. Festigny (89164)
60. Fleury-la-Vallée (89167)
61. Fleys (89168)
62. Fontaines (89173)
63. Fontenay-près-Chablis (89175)
64. Fontenay-sous-Fouronnes (89177)
65. Fontenoy (89179)
66. Fouronnes (89182)
67. Germigny (89186)
68. Gurgy (89198)
69. Gy-l'Évêque (89199)
70. Hauterive (89200)
71. Les Hauts de Forterre (89405)
72. Héry (89201)
73. Irancy (89202)
74. Jaulges (89205)
75. Jussy (89212)
76. Lain (89215)
77. Lainsecq (89216)
78. Lalande (89217)
79. Laroche-Saint-Cydroine (89218)
80. Lasson (89219)
81. Lavau (89220)
82. Leugny (89221)
83. Levis (89222)
84. Lichères-près-Aigremont (89224)
85. Lignorelles (89226)
86. Ligny-le-Châtel (89227)
87. Lindry (89228)
88. Lucy-sur-Cure (89233)
89. Lucy-sur-Yonne (89234)
90. Mailly-la-Ville (89237)
91. Mailly-le-Château (89238)
92. Maligny (89242)
93. Mercy (89249)
94. Méré (89250)
95. Merry-Sec (89252)
96. Merry-la-Vallée (89251)
97. Mézilles (89254)
98. Migé (89256)
99. Migennes (89257)
100. Monéteau (89263)
101. Montholon (89003)
102. Montigny-la-Resle (89265)
103. Mont-Saint-Sulpice (89268)
104. Mouffy (89270)
105. Moulins-sur-Ouanne (89272)
106. Moutiers-en-Puisaye (89273)
107. Neuvy-Sautour (89276)
108. Nitry (89277)
109. Les Ormes (89281)
110. Ormoy (89282)
111. Ouanne (89283)
112. Parly (89286)
113. Paroy-en-Othe (89288)
114. Percey (89292)
115. Perrigny (89295)
116. Poilly-sur-Serein (89303)
117. Poilly-sur-Tholon (89304)
118. Pontigny (89307)
119. Pourrain (89311)
120. Prégilbert (89314)
121. Préhy (89315)
122. Quenne (89319)
123. Rogny-les-Sept-Écluses (89324)
124. Ronchères (89325)
125. Rouvray (89328)
126. Sainpuits (89331)
127. Saint-Bris-le-Vineux (89337)
128. Saint-Cyr-les-Colons (89341)
129. Sainte-Pallaye (89363)
130. Saint-Fargeau (89344)
131. Saint-Florentin (89345)
132. Saint-Georges-sur-Baulche (89346)
133. Saint-Martin-des-Champs (89352)
134. Saint-Maurice-le-Vieil (89360)
135. Saint-Maurice-Thizouaille (89361)
136. Saint-Privé (89365)
137. Saint-Sauveur-en-Puisaye (89368)
138. Saints-en-Puisaye (89367)
139. Seignelay (89382)
140. Sementron (89383)
141. Senan (89384)
142. Sery (89394)
143. Sommecaise (89397)
144. Sormery (89398)
145. Sougères-en-Puisaye (89400)
146. Soumaintrain (89402)
147. Tannerre-en-Puisaye (89408)
148. Thury (89416)
149. Toucy (89419)
150. Treigny-Perreuse-Sainte-Colombe (89420)
151. Trucy-sur-Yonne (89424)
152. Turny (89425)
153. Val-de-Mercy (89426)
154. Le Val-d'Ocre (89334)
155. Vallan (89427)
156. Valravillon (89196)
157. Varennes (89430)
158. Venizy (89436)
159. Venouse (89437)
160. Venoy (89438)
161. Vergigny (89439)
162. Vermenton (89441)
163. Villefargeau (89453)
164. Villeneuve-Saint-Salves (89463)
165. Villeneuve-les-Genêts (89462)
166. Villiers-Saint-Benoît (89472)
167. Villiers-Vineux (89474)
168. Villy (89477)
169. Vincelles (89478)
170. Vincelottes (89479)

== History ==
The arrondissement of Auxerre was created in 1800. At the January 2017 reorganisation of the arrondissements of Yonne, it received 13 communes from the arrondissement of Avallon, and it lost three communes to the arrondissement of Avallon and 12 communes to the arrondissement of Sens.

As a result of the reorganisation of the cantons of France which came into effect in 2015, the borders of the cantons are no longer related to the borders of the arrondissements. The cantons of the arrondissement of Auxerre were, as of January 2015:

1. Aillant-sur-Tholon
2. Auxerre-Est
3. Auxerre-Nord
4. Auxerre-Nord-Ouest
5. Auxerre-Sud
6. Auxerre-Sud-Ouest
7. Bléneau
8. Brienon-sur-Armançon
9. Chablis
10. Charny
11. Coulanges-la-Vineuse
12. Coulanges-sur-Yonne
13. Courson-les-Carrières
14. Joigny
15. Ligny-le-Châtel
16. Migennes
17. Saint-Fargeau
18. Saint-Florentin
19. Saint-Sauveur-en-Puisaye
20. Seignelay
21. Toucy
22. Vermenton
