= Bonnard =

Bonnard is both a surname and a given name. Notable people with the name include:

- Abel Bonnard (1883–1968), French poet, novelist and politician
- André Bonnard (1888–1959), Swiss scholar and translator of classical Greek
- Jean-Louis Bonnard (1824–1852), French Roman Catholic missionary
- Marie Bonnard du Parquet (died 1659), wife of Jacques Dyel du Parquet, one of the first governors of Martinique
- Mario Bonnard (1889–1965), Italian actor and film director
- Michelle Bonnard (born 1980), English actress
- Pierre Bonnard (1867–1947), French artist
- Bonnard J. Teegarden, American astrophysicist

Fictional characters:

- The Bonnards, a fictional family in the film The Happy Time and related works based on the stories of Robert Fontaine

== See also ==
- Bonnard, Yonne, a French commune
