= Prosper Lafaye =

French painter

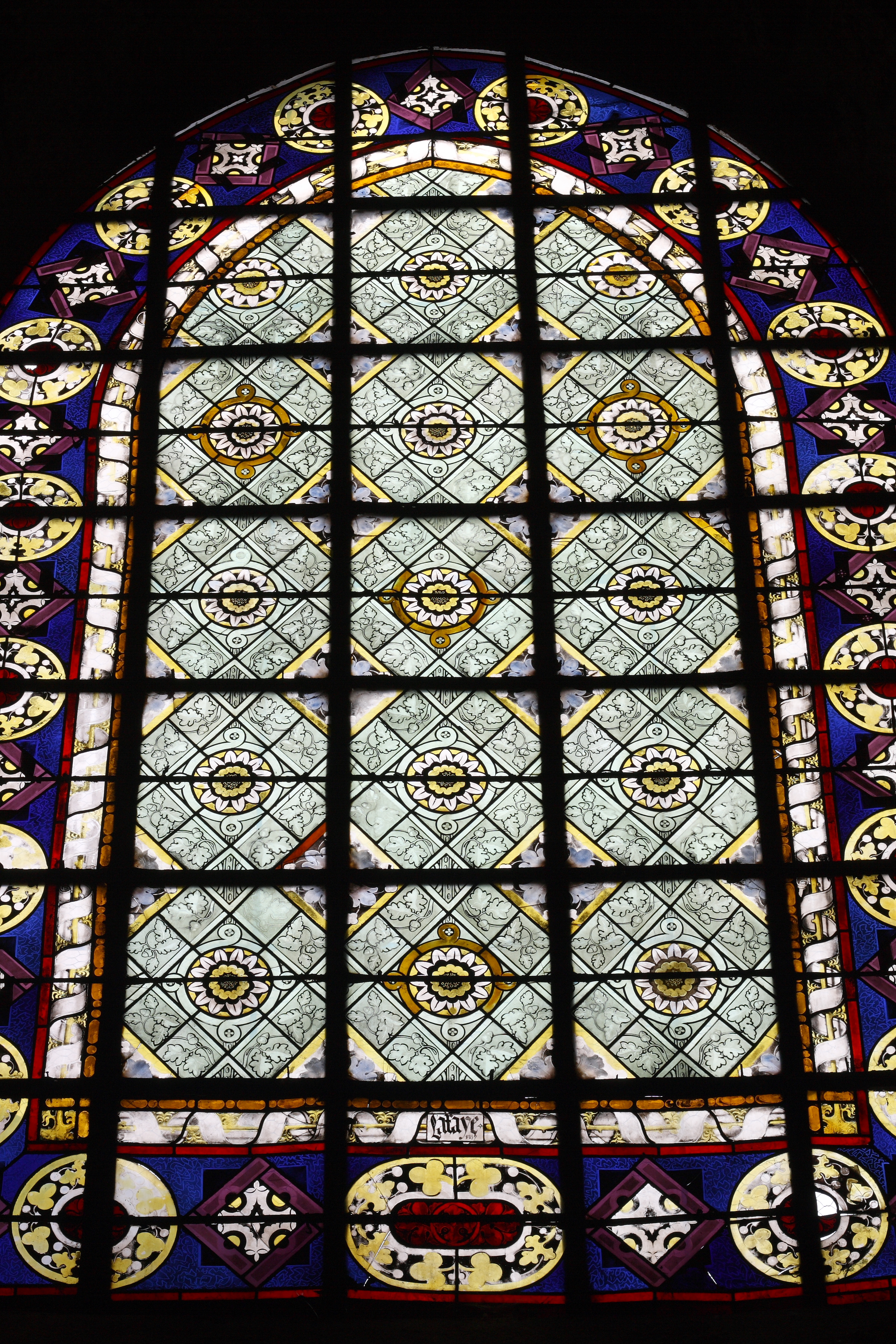
Stained glass window at Saint-Martin in Chevreuse

Prosper Lafaye, originally Lafait (23 September 1806, Mont-Saint-Sulpice - 3 March 1883, Paris) was a French painter at the court of King Louis-Philippe I. He also worked as a designer and was a master stained glass artist.

== Biography ==
His father, Victor, was a mason. At the age of fourteen, he left his family to live with an uncle in Paris. His initial artistic training came in the workshops of artists who have now been forgotten but, in 1827, he was able to work with Auguste Couder. His first exhibition came four years later, when he presented an equestrian portrait of Napoleon. After that, he worked as assistant to Jean Alaux, restoring various monumental paintings. This led to his participation in restorative work being done at the Château de Versailles.

From 1834 to 1837, he created several battle paintings for the Musée de l'Histoire de France at Versailles. Then, from 1838 to 1842, he received orders directly from the Royal Family. He also had numerous customers among the French bourgeoisie.

During a trip to Burgundy in 1845, he developed an interest in the creation and restoration of stained glass windows. He trained himself by participating in projects at Notre-Dame-des-Blancs-Manteaux and Saint-Eustache, then undertook restorative work on his own at several churches, including Saint-Étienne-du-Mont, Saint-Nicolas-du-Chardonnet, Saint-Médard and Saint-Merri.

In 1851, he had a showing at the Great Exhibition in London. That same year, he hired two assistants, Annette and Sophie Coppée, sisters of the poet François Coppée. The following year he married Sophie. In addition to giving him three girls and a boy, she became an indispensable part of the window production process and may have created some entirely on her own. Eventually, between 1864 and 1866, they would work on windows at the Louvre. This was followed by windows at the parish church in his hometown.

He continued to paint, exhibiting at the Exposition Universelle (1855), the Exposition Universelle (1867) and the Exposition Universelle (1878).

After his death, his studio was closed. His son, Savinien, had died in 1854 and his daughters had not learned the trade from their mother. He and Sophie are buried together in Mont-Saint-Sulpice.

== Selected paintings ==
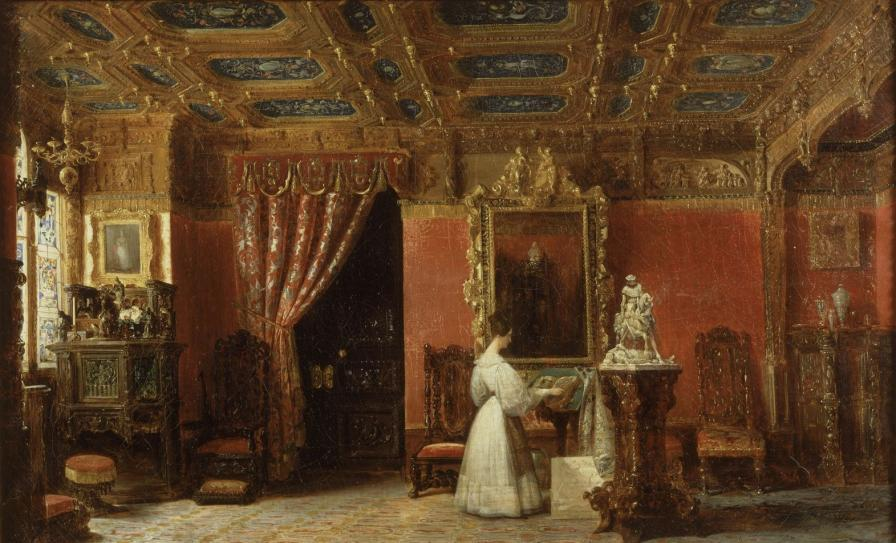
Princess Marie d'Orléans in her apartments at the Tuileries Palace

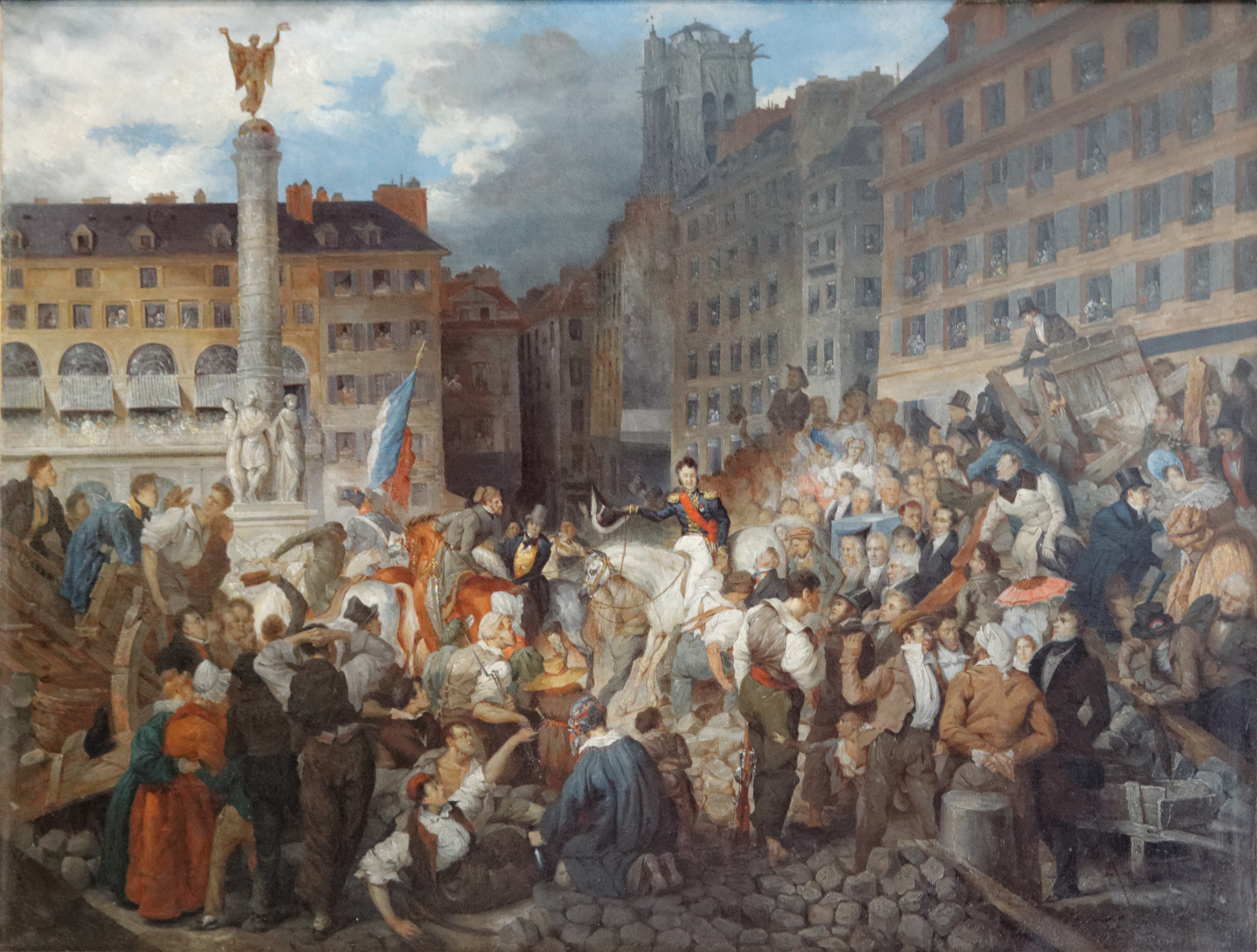
The Duc d'Orléans Crossing the Place du Châtelet

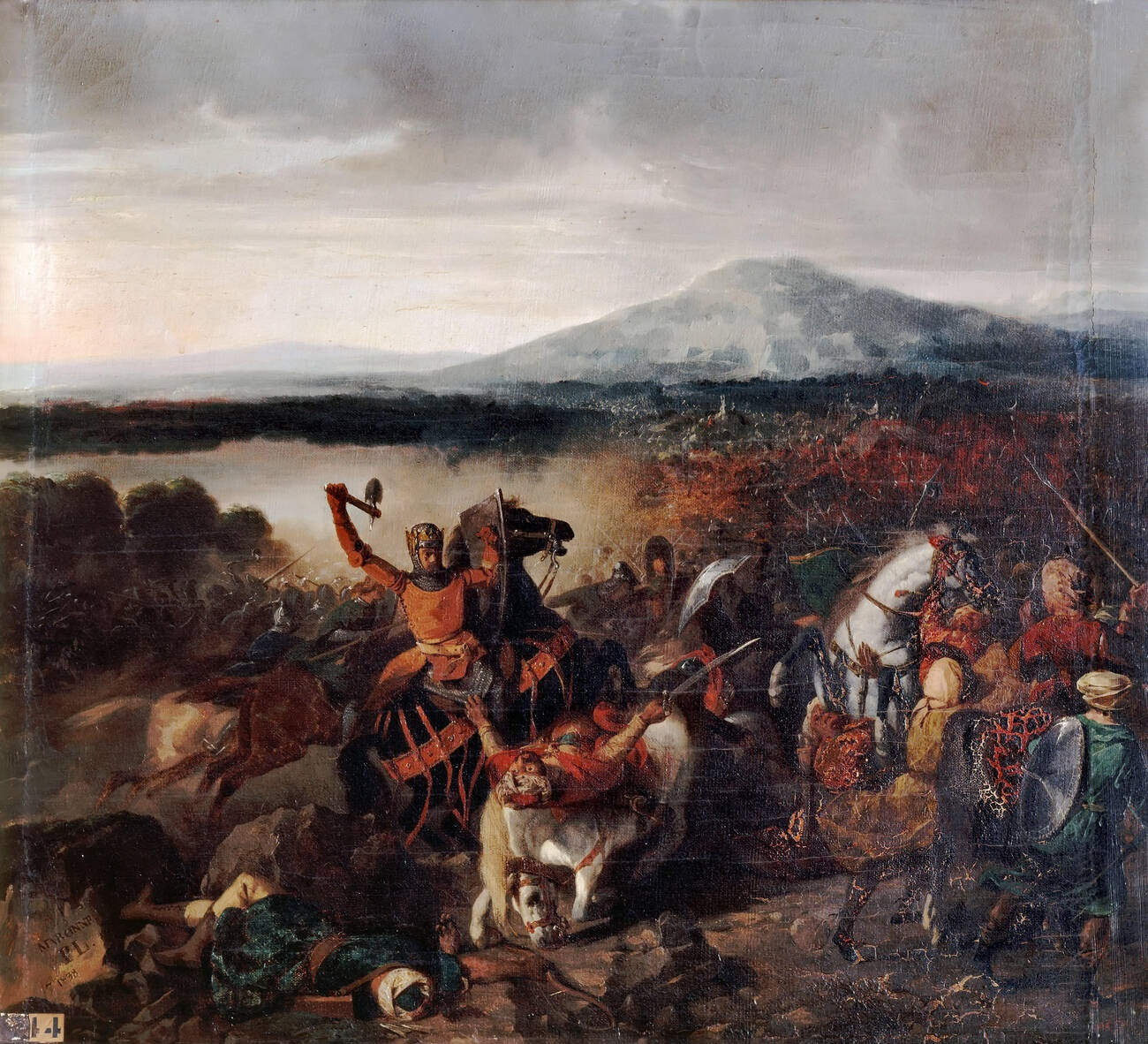
Roger I of Sicily at the Battle of Cerami

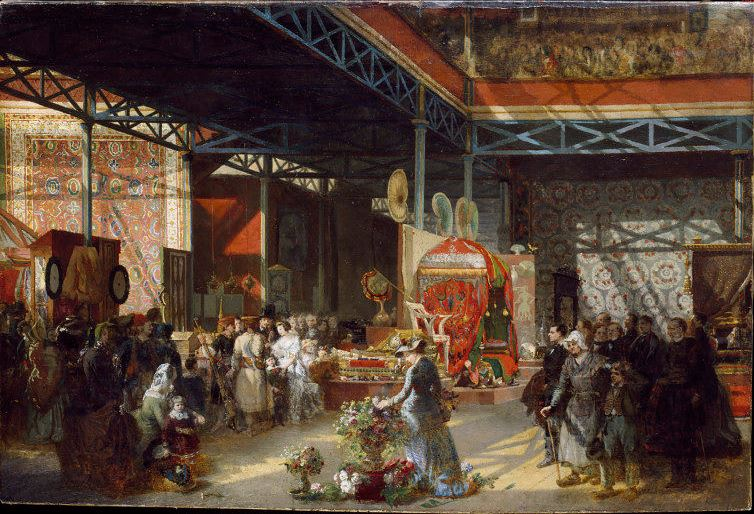
Queen Victoria and Prince Albert at the Indian Pavilion of the Great Exhibition
