= Gérard Bourgoin =

French businessperson and politician (1939–2025)

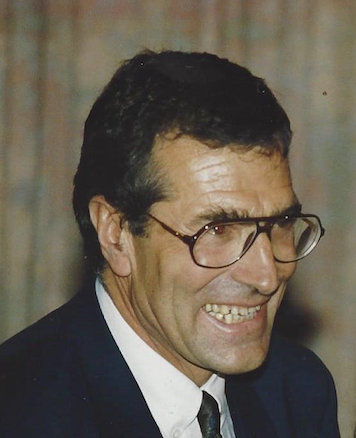
- Born: 6 July 1939; Chailley, France
- Died: 2 March 2025 (aged 85); Brienon-sur-Armançon, France
- Occupations: Businessman, sport director, politician
- Years active: 1966–2025
- Organization(s): AJ Auxerre; LFP
- Political party: National Centre of Independents and Peasants

Gérard Bourgoin (6 July 1939 – 2 March 2025) was a French businessman, sports chairman and politician. He was the president of the French football club AJ Auxerre from 24 May 2011 to 19 April 2013.

== Career as a businessman ==
Gérard Bourgoin was born in Chailley in the department of Yonne, the son of a butcher. He began his training course with a CAP (Certificat d'Aptitude Professionnelle) in butchery and then in accounting. By 1966, he had created in his native village of Chailley his first poultry factory named La Chaillotine.

The same year, the family company expanded to become one of the biggest French poultry groups. During the 1980s, La Chaillotine changed its name to BSA (Bourgoin SA), diversified and developed in the international field. With the buyout of several companies, BSA became the first worldwide leader of fresh poultry with 30% of the national production, 6,600 employees, 30 factories and a gross revenue of 6.5 billion francs.

Faced to industrial and financial difficulties, the group that he managed with his daughter Corinne Bourgoin, named general director in 1996, was in bankruptcy in August 2000. It was dismantled and the successors share the group together. The company Duc continues to utilise the factory at Chailley.

== Career as a football chairman ==
A supporter of the AJ Auxerre where he was vice-president, Bourgoin sponsored the football club with his poultry group ("La Chaillotine" from 1978 to 1983 and from 1986 to 1990, then "Duc de Bourgogne" and "Duc" from 1990 to 1996) as his intermediary. He was elected in July 2000 president of the Ligue de Football Professionnel replacing Noël Le Graët. His presidency was not successful and was followed by strong internal opposition. He was then replaced by Frédéric Thiriez.

In May 2011, with the support of Guy Roux and Jean-Claude Hamel, he became president of the AJ Auxerre. He named on 8 June 2011 Laurent Fournier as a new trainer of the club, while Jean Fernandez had his contract ended and left for the AS Nancy.

== Death ==
Bourgoin died on 2 March 2025, on the way home to Chailley from a football match between Auxerre and Strasbourg, held at the Stade de l'Abbé-Deschamps in Auxerre. He was 85. It is believed that he suffered some kind of medical emergency while driving.

== Bibliography ==
- Gérard Bourgoin (1994). Gérard Bourgoin, itinéraire d'un homme pressé (in French). Paris: TF1 Éditions. ISBN 2-87761-070-5.
- Guy Roux (2006). Entre nous. Mémoires (in French). Paris: Plon. ISBN 2-259-20391-4.
- Marc Villand, Francis Mateo (2012). Mon associé Fidel Castro (in French). Paris: Histoire d'être. ISBN 978-2-84879-002-2.
