= Hauterive =

Hauterive may refer to:

- In Switzerland:
  - Hauterive, Neuchâtel
  - Hauterive, Fribourg
- In France:
  - Hauterive, Allier
  - Hauterive, Orne
  - Hauterive, Yonne
- In Canada:
  - Hauterive, Quebec, now part of Baie-Comeau

== See also ==
- Abbey of Hauterive, in Posieux, Hauterive, Fribourg, Switzerland
- Hauterive-la-Fresse, Doubs department, France
- Alexandre Maurice Blanc de Lanautte, Comte d'Hauterive (1754–1830)
- Hauterives
