= Charmoy =

Charmoy is the name of the following communes in France:

- Charmoy, Aube, in the Aube department
- Charmoy, Saône-et-Loire, in the Saône-et-Loire department
- Charmoy, Yonne, in the Yonne department

== See also ==
- Charmois (disambiguation)
