= Percey =

- Commune
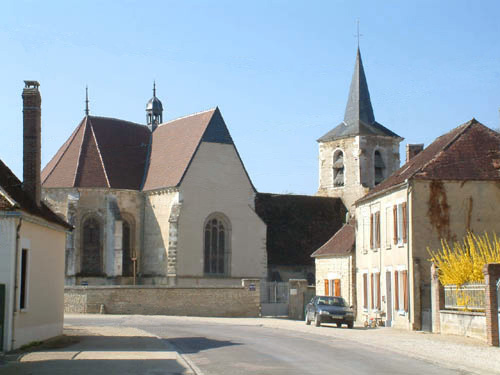
- The church in Percey

- Coat of arms
- Location of Percey
- Location within France Location within Bourgogne-Franche-Comté
- Coordinates: 47°57′52″N 3°49′34″E
- Country: France
- Region: Bourgogne-Franche-Comté
- Department: Yonne
- Arrondissement: Auxerre
- Canton: Saint-Florentin

Government
  - Mayor (2020–2026): Daniel Boucheron
- Area^{1}: 9.56 km^{2} (3.69 sq mi)
- Elevation: 135 m (443 ft)
- Highest elevation: 155 m (509 ft)
- Lowest elevation: 109 m (358 ft)
- Population (2023): 248
  - Density: 25.9/km^{2} (67.2/sq mi)
- Time zone: UTC+01:00 (CET)
  - Summer (DST): UTC+02:00 (CEST)
- INSEE/Postal code: 89292 /89360
- ^{1} French Land Register data, which excludes lakes, ponds, glaciers > 1 km^{2} (0.386 sq mi or 247 acres) and river estuaries.

Percey (French pronunciation: [pɛʁsɛ]) is a commune in the Yonne department in Bourgogne-Franche-Comté in north-central France.

It lies on the Canal de Bourgogne, with the Route départementale (D945), named locally «Rue Nationale» running through it, between Saint-Florentin and Tonnerre.

Percey is the main village of the commune of Percey. Other villages are: Les Milleries and La Sogne.

The Château de Percey and the farm, church and old coach-house still exist.

ADSL is available there (as of 2012 2Mbs maximum), and the Chateau hosts a free wireless hotspot, as does the town hall (since 2008).

== See also ==
- Communes of the Yonne department
