= Sormery =

- Commune
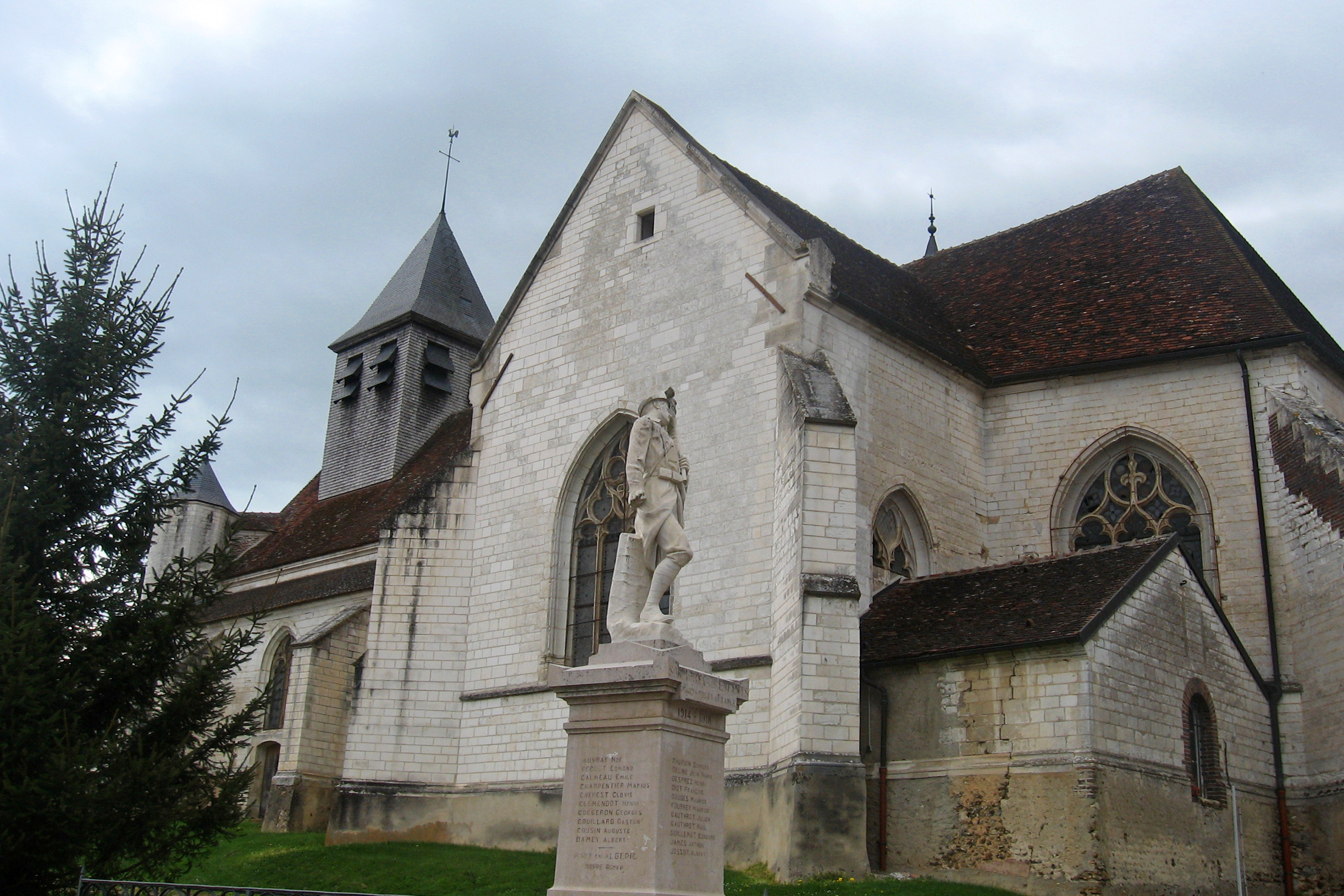
- The church in Sormery

- Coat of arms
- Location of Sormery
- Location within France Location within Bourgogne-Franche-Comté
- Coordinates: 48°05′19″N 3°46′20″E
- Country: France
- Region: Bourgogne-Franche-Comté
- Department: Yonne
- Arrondissement: Auxerre
- Canton: Saint-Florentin

Government
  - Mayor (2020–2026): Gérard Delagneau
- Area^{1}: 30.56 km^{2} (11.80 sq mi)
- Highest elevation: 296 m (971 ft)
- Lowest elevation: 155 m (509 ft)
- Population (2023): 374
  - Density: 12.2/km^{2} (31.7/sq mi)
- Time zone: UTC+01:00 (CET)
  - Summer (DST): UTC+02:00 (CEST)
- INSEE/Postal code: 89398 /89570
- ^{1} French Land Register data, which excludes lakes, ponds, glaciers > 1 km^{2} (0.386 sq mi or 247 acres) and river estuaries.

Sormery (French pronunciation: [sɔʁməʁi]) is a commune in the Yonne department in Bourgogne-Franche-Comté in north-central France.

== See also ==
- Communes of the Yonne department
