= Vaast Barthélemy Henry =

French Catholic priest (1797–1884)

Vaast Barthélemy Henry, called Abbé Henry, (6 February 1797 – 21 February 1884) was a French Catholic priest, parish priest of Quarré-les-Tombes from 1823 to 1884. He is known as a regional historian.

== Biography ==
Henry was born in Seignelay. As a priest, he was appointed to his first post, vicar to Toucy, and in 1823, Archbishop of Sens (1817–1829), Monsignor Anne Louis Henri de La Fare (175–-1829) - appointed him dean of St. George parish in the area of Quarré-les-Tombes.

He wrote long pages about the patron saint of his parish and the pilgrimages formerly made in the church of Quarré in honor of this saint, as well as authentic relics brought back from Rome in 1859.

His relations with the local authorities were tense. He had the church enlarged in order to receive the faithful. In 1845 the north aisle and then in 1847 and 1849 the two lateral chapels, then in 1848 the first turret on the left, the second in 1850 which houses the baptismal fonts. To finish, in 1852? by the granite portal with its sculptures and the elevation of the bell tower.

In addition to the enlargement of the church, he had the reconstruction of the Chapelle Saint-Eptade carried out in 1860 at the Lavaults, along the road leading to Saint-Brisson, and the founding of two religious schools and various writings on the regional history of the canton and other stories of religious establishments and biographies of saints and other personalities.

== Religious titles ==
- Vicar of Toucy
- Curé-Doyen de Quarré-les-Tombes (1823–1884)
- Honorary Canon of Sens Metropole
- Member of several learned societies

== Literary works ==
- 1833: Mémoires historiques sur la ville de Seignelay, 2.vol in-8., t.I 370. p. Carte, plan, lexique en patois, t.II. 403.p? Chez Comynet, Imprimeur Libraire à Avallon. Reprint 2004, Ed; Livre d'Histoire Lorisse t.I., ISBN 2-87760-101-3, t.II., ISBN 2-87760-102-1
- 1839: Henry, Vaast Barthélemy (1839). Histoire de l'abbaye de Pontigny, ordre de Cîteaux, département de l'Yonne; suivie de quelques notices historiques sur les communes des environs, et des principales pièces justificatives (in French). Auxerre: Maillefer. p. 404. OCLC 35333167.
- 1853: Histoire de l'Abbaye de Saint-Germain d'Auxerre, Ch. Gallot in Auxerre, 590 pages.
- 1863: Vies d'Eptade d'Autun, solitaire, Blaise Bégon and Pierre, 43.p.
- 1875: Mémoires historiques sur le Canton de Quarré-les-Tombes, vol.I, Odobé, reissued by Ediplume, 2006, 716.p. ISBN 291530114X.
- 1876: Mémoires historiques sur le Canton de Quarré-les-Tombes, vol.II, Odobé, reissued by Ediplume, 2006, 716.p. ISB 2915301158.

== Bibliography ==
- Catherine Robbe, "Quel regard l'abbé Henry portait-il aux morvandiaux?", in Bulletin d'Information de Mémoires Vivantes du Canton de Quarré-les-Tombes, issue 42, summer 2012, pp. 5–8.
- "Henry (Vast-Barthélemy)", in Description des villes et campagnes du département de l'Yvonne, Ch. Gallot, 1870, volume 1, p. 341.
- Marc Pautet, Les Inconnus Célèbres de Quarré-les-Tombes et des environs, tome I & tome II. éd. Mémoires Vivantes du Canton de Quarré-les-Tombes.
