= Charmois =

Charmois may refer to:

- Charmois, Meurthe-et-Moselle, a commune of the Lorraine region of France
- Charmois, Territoire de Belfort, a commune of the Franche-Comté region of France
- Charmois-devant-Bruyères, a commune in the Vosges department in France
- Charmois-l'Orgueilleux, a commune in the Vosges department in France

== See also ==
- Charmoy (disambiguation)
