= Brion, Yonne =

Brion
- Commune
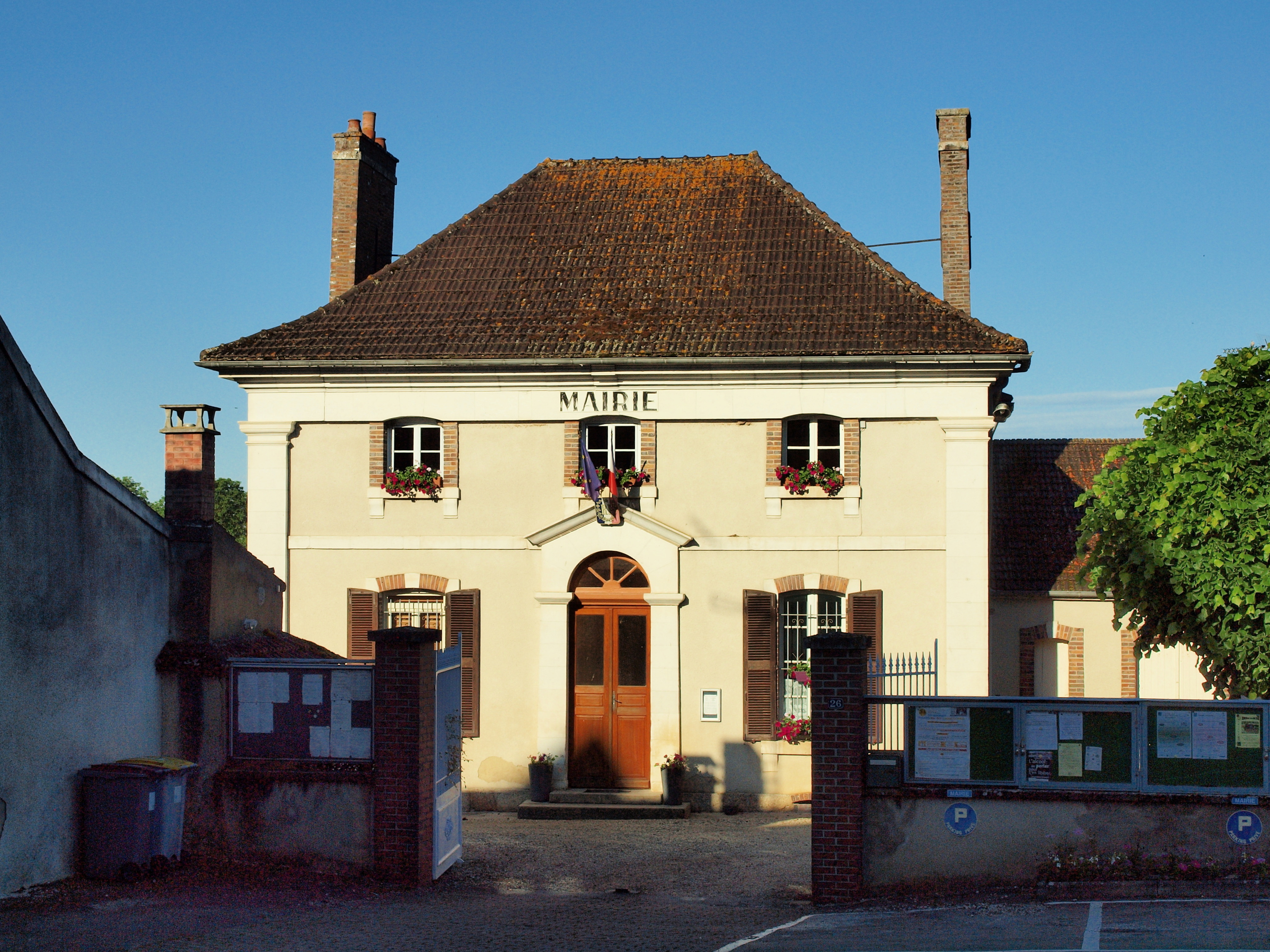
- The town hall in Brion

- Coat of arms
- Location of Brion
- Location within France Location within Bourgogne-Franche-Comté
- Coordinates: 47°59′47″N 3°28′54″E
- Country: France
- Region: Bourgogne-Franche-Comté
- Department: Yonne
- Arrondissement: Sens
- Canton: Migennes

Government
  - Mayor (2020–2026): Philippe Petit
- Area^{1}: 16.50 km^{2} (6.37 sq mi)
- Highest elevation: 249 m (817 ft)
- Lowest elevation: 94 m (308 ft)
- Population (2023): 612
  - Density: 37.1/km^{2} (96.1/sq mi)
- Time zone: UTC+01:00 (CET)
  - Summer (DST): UTC+02:00 (CEST)
- INSEE/Postal code: 89056 /89400
- ^{1} French Land Register data, which excludes lakes, ponds, glaciers > 1 km^{2} (0.386 sq mi or 247 acres) and river estuaries.

Brion (French pronunciation: [bʁijɔ̃]) is a commune in the Yonne department in Bourgogne-Franche-Comté in north-central France.

== See also ==
- Communes of the Yonne department
