= Vergigny =

- Commune
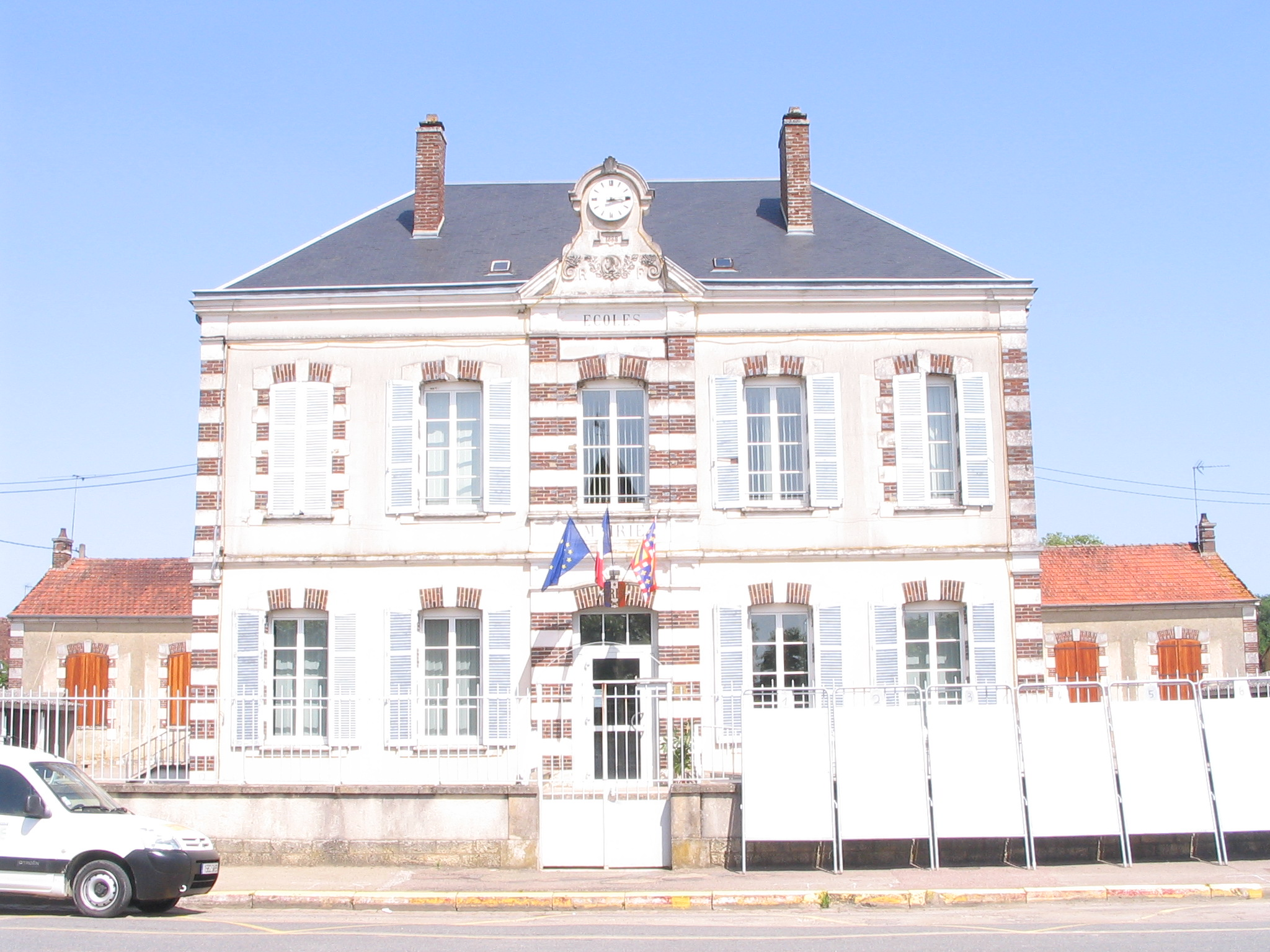
- The town hall in Vergigny

- Coat of arms
- Location of Vergigny
- Location within France Location within Bourgogne-Franche-Comté
- Coordinates: 47°58′16″N 3°43′12″E
- Country: France
- Region: Bourgogne-Franche-Comté
- Department: Yonne
- Arrondissement: Auxerre
- Canton: Saint-Florentin

Government
  - Mayor (2020–2026): Frédéric Blanchet
- Area^{1}: 38.01 km^{2} (14.68 sq mi)
- Highest elevation: 178 m (584 ft)
- Lowest elevation: 90 m (300 ft)
- Population (2023): 1,486
  - Density: 39.09/km^{2} (101.3/sq mi)
- Time zone: UTC+01:00 (CET)
  - Summer (DST): UTC+02:00 (CEST)
- INSEE/Postal code: 89439 /89600
- ^{1} French Land Register data, which excludes lakes, ponds, glaciers > 1 km^{2} (0.386 sq mi or 247 acres) and river estuaries.

Vergigny (French pronunciation: [vɛʁʒiɲi]) is a commune in the Yonne department in Bourgogne-Franche-Comté in north-central France.

== See also ==
- Communes of the Yonne department
