= Butteaux =

- Commune
- Coat of arms
- Location of Butteaux
- Location within France Location within Bourgogne-Franche-Comté
- Coordinates: 47°58′43″N 3°48′38″E
- Country: France
- Region: Bourgogne-Franche-Comté
- Department: Yonne
- Arrondissement: Auxerre
- Canton: Saint-Florentin

Government
  - Mayor (2020–2026): Michel Fourrey
- Area^{1}: 7.55 km^{2} (2.92 sq mi)
- Highest elevation: 152 m (499 ft)
- Lowest elevation: 106 m (348 ft)
- Population (2023): 264
  - Density: 35.0/km^{2} (90.6/sq mi)
- Time zone: UTC+01:00 (CET)
  - Summer (DST): UTC+02:00 (CEST)
- INSEE/Postal code: 89061 /89360
- ^{1} French Land Register data, which excludes lakes, ponds, glaciers > 1 km^{2} (0.386 sq mi or 247 acres) and river estuaries.

Butteaux (French pronunciation: [byto]) is a commune in the Yonne department in Bourgogne-Franche-Comté in north-central France.

== Demographics ==
Historical population
Year	Pop.	±% p.a.
1968	216	—
1975	239	+1.46%
1982	221	−1.11%
1990	257	+1.90%
1999	259	+0.09%
2007	266	+0.33%
2012	268	+0.15%
2017	255	−0.99%
2023	264	+0.58%
Source: INSEE

== See also ==
- Communes of the Yonne department
