= Villiers-Vineux =

- Commune
- Location of Villiers-Vineux
- Location within France Location within Bourgogne-Franche-Comté
- Coordinates: 47°56′38″N 3°50′06″E
- Country: France
- Region: Bourgogne-Franche-Comté
- Department: Yonne
- Arrondissement: Auxerre
- Canton: Saint-Florentin

Government
  - Mayor (2020–2026): Kamel Ferrag
- Area^{1}: 11.18 km^{2} (4.32 sq mi)
- Highest elevation: 159 m (522 ft)
- Lowest elevation: 109 m (358 ft)
- Population (2023): 288
  - Density: 25.8/km^{2} (66.7/sq mi)
- Time zone: UTC+01:00 (CET)
  - Summer (DST): UTC+02:00 (CEST)
- INSEE/Postal code: 89474 /89360
- ^{1} French Land Register data, which excludes lakes, ponds, glaciers > 1 km^{2} (0.386 sq mi or 247 acres) and river estuaries.

Villiers-Vineux (French pronunciation: [vilje vinø]) is a commune in the Yonne department in Bourgogne-Franche-Comté in north-central France.

== See also ==
- Communes of the Yonne department
