= Cheny =

- Commune
- Location of Cheny
- Location within France Location within Bourgogne-Franche-Comté
- Coordinates: 47°57′13″N 3°32′06″E
- Country: France
- Region: Bourgogne-Franche-Comté
- Department: Yonne
- Arrondissement: Auxerre
- Canton: Migennes

Government
  - Mayor (2020–2026): Didier Jacquemain
- Area^{1}: 9.72 km^{2} (3.75 sq mi)
- Elevation: 89 m (292 ft)
- Highest elevation: 145 m (476 ft)
- Lowest elevation: 82 m (269 ft)
- Population (2023): 2,206
  - Density: 227/km^{2} (588/sq mi)
- Time zone: UTC+01:00 (CET)
  - Summer (DST): UTC+02:00 (CEST)
- INSEE/Postal code: 89099 /89400
- ^{1} French Land Register data, which excludes lakes, ponds, glaciers > 1 km^{2} (0.386 sq mi or 247 acres) and river estuaries.

Cheny (French pronunciation: [ʃəni]) is a commune in the Yonne department in Bourgogne-Franche-Comté in north-central France.

== Population ==
Historical population
Year	Pop.	±% p.a.
1968	1,678	—
1975	2,210	+4.01%
1982	2,523	+1.91%
1990	2,521	−0.01%
1999	2,535	+0.06%
2007	2,572	+0.18%
2012	2,417	−1.24%
2017	2,487	+0.57%
2023	2,206	−1.98%
Source: INSEE

== See also ==
- Communes of the Yonne department
