= Soumaintrain =

- Commune
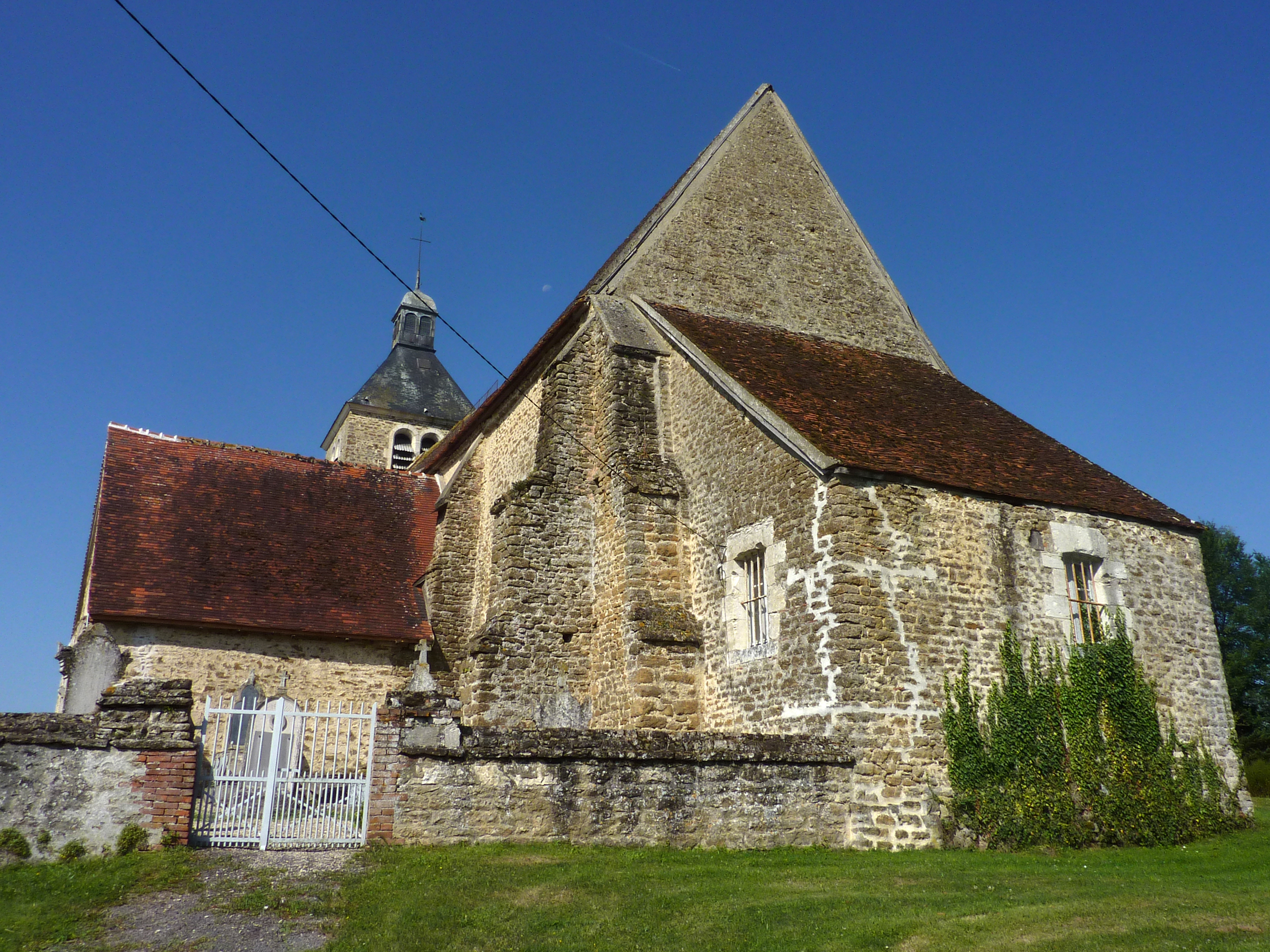
- The church in Soumaintrain
- Location of Soumaintrain
- Location within France Location within Bourgogne-Franche-Comté
- Coordinates: 48°00′58″N 3°50′02″E
- Country: France
- Region: Bourgogne-Franche-Comté
- Department: Yonne
- Arrondissement: Auxerre
- Canton: Saint-Florentin

Government
  - Mayor (2020–2026): Monique Derouelle
- Area^{1}: 10.61 km^{2} (4.10 sq mi)
- Highest elevation: 160 m (520 ft)
- Lowest elevation: 107 m (351 ft)
- Population (2023): 211
  - Density: 19.9/km^{2} (51.5/sq mi)
- Time zone: UTC+01:00 (CET)
  - Summer (DST): UTC+02:00 (CEST)
- INSEE/Postal code: 89402 /89570
- ^{1} French Land Register data, which excludes lakes, ponds, glaciers > 1 km^{2} (0.386 sq mi or 247 acres) and river estuaries.

Soumaintrain (French pronunciation: [sumɛ̃tʁɛ̃]) is a commune in the Yonne department in Bourgogne-Franche-Comté in north-central France. The local Soumaintrain cheese is a washed-rind cheese with protected geographical indication.

== See also ==
- Communes of the Yonne department
