= Seignelay =

- Commune
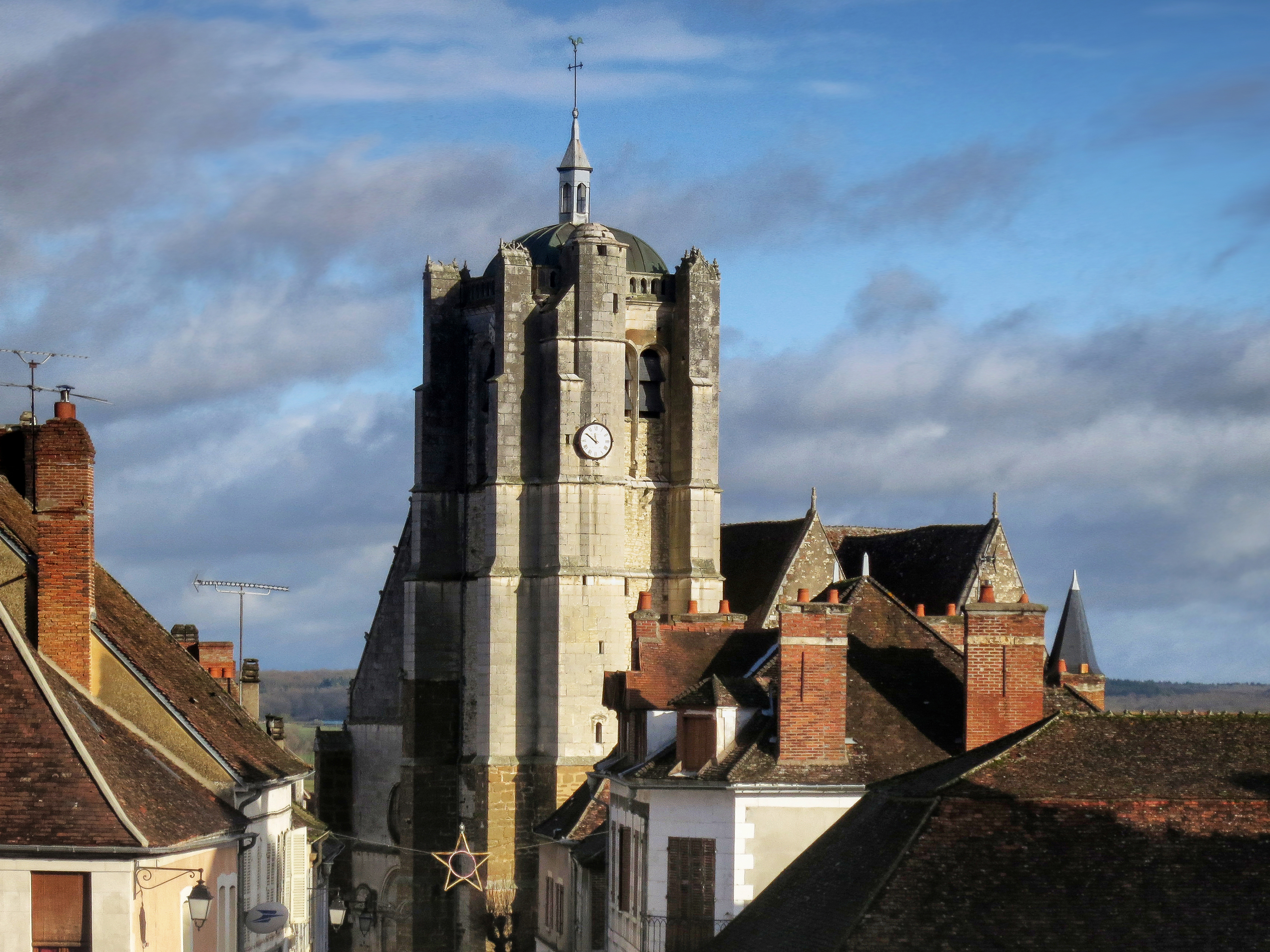
- The church in Seignelay

- Coat of arms
- Location of Seignelay
- Location within France Location within Bourgogne-Franche-Comté
- Coordinates: 47°54′15″N 3°36′09″E
- Country: France
- Region: Bourgogne-Franche-Comté
- Department: Yonne
- Arrondissement: Auxerre
- Canton: Saint-Florentin

Government
  - Mayor (2020–2026): Thierry Corniot
- Area^{1}: 13.47 km^{2} (5.20 sq mi)
- Highest elevation: 192 m (630 ft)
- Lowest elevation: 88 m (289 ft)
- Population (2023): 1,476
  - Density: 109.6/km^{2} (283.8/sq mi)
- Time zone: UTC+01:00 (CET)
  - Summer (DST): UTC+02:00 (CEST)
- INSEE/Postal code: 89382 /89250
- ^{1} French Land Register data, which excludes lakes, ponds, glaciers > 1 km^{2} (0.386 sq mi or 247 acres) and river estuaries.

Seignelay (French pronunciation: [sɛɲlɛ]) is a commune in the Yonne department in Bourgogne-Franche-Comté in north-central France. The regional historian Vaast Barthélemy Henry (1797–1884) was born in Seignelay.

== See also ==
- Communes of the Yonne department
