= Beugnon =

- Commune
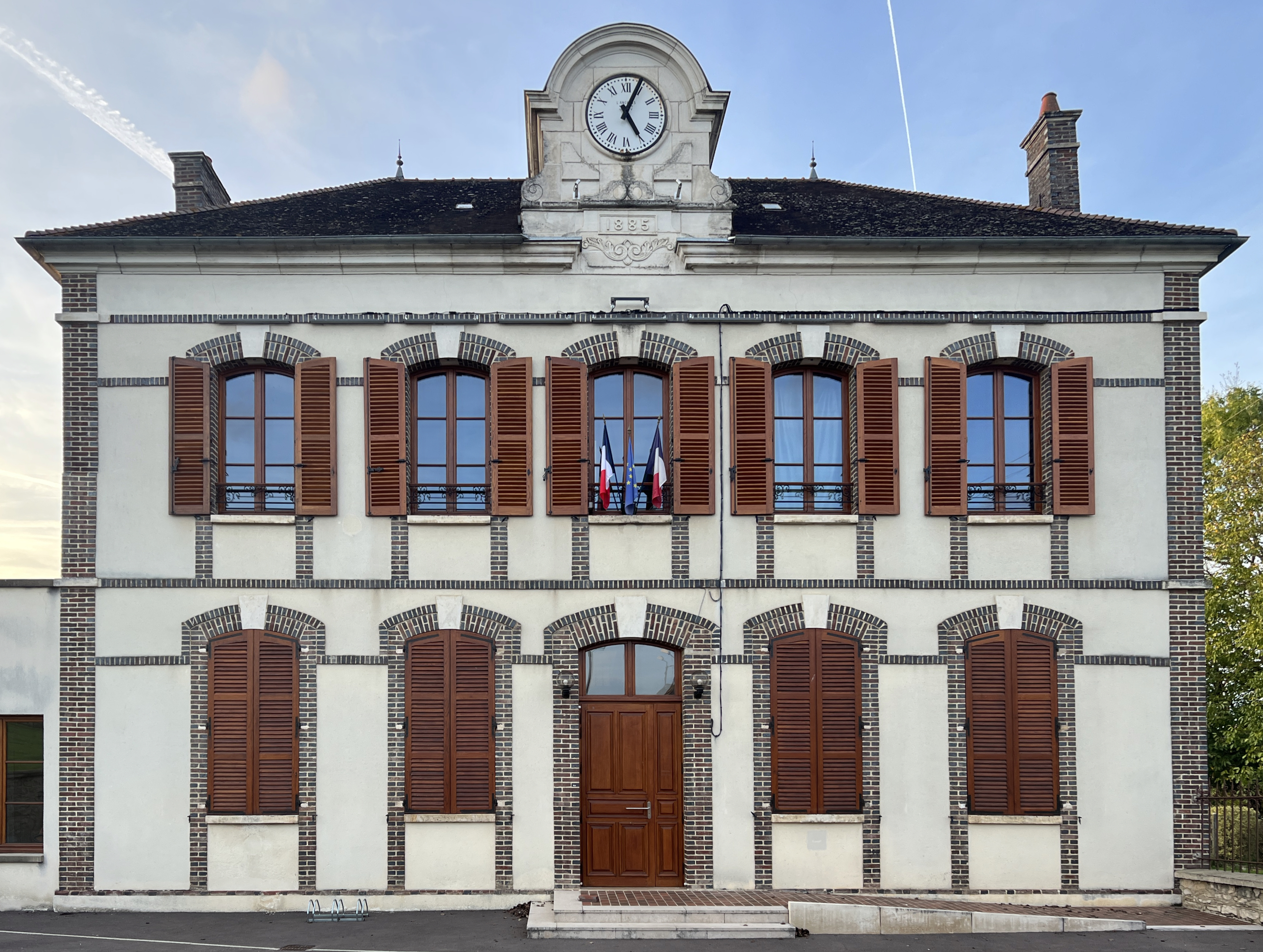
- Beugnon Town hall

- Coat of arms
- Location of Beugnon
- Location within France Location within Bourgogne-Franche-Comté
- Coordinates: 48°01′17″N 3°48′22″E
- Country: France
- Region: Bourgogne-Franche-Comté
- Department: Yonne
- Arrondissement: Auxerre
- Canton: Saint-Florentin

Government
  - Mayor (2020–2026): Hervé Morinière
- Area^{1}: 7.70 km^{2} (2.97 sq mi)
- Highest elevation: 136 m (446 ft)
- Lowest elevation: 105 m (344 ft)
- Population (2023): 279
  - Density: 36.2/km^{2} (93.8/sq mi)
- Time zone: UTC+01:00 (CET)
  - Summer (DST): UTC+02:00 (CEST)
- INSEE/Postal code: 89041 /89570
- ^{1} French Land Register data, which excludes lakes, ponds, glaciers > 1 km^{2} (0.386 sq mi or 247 acres) and river estuaries.

Beugnon (French pronunciation: [bœɲɔ̃]) is a commune in the Yonne department in Bourgogne-Franche-Comté in north-central France.

== See also ==
- Communes of the Yonne department
