= Chéu =

- Commune
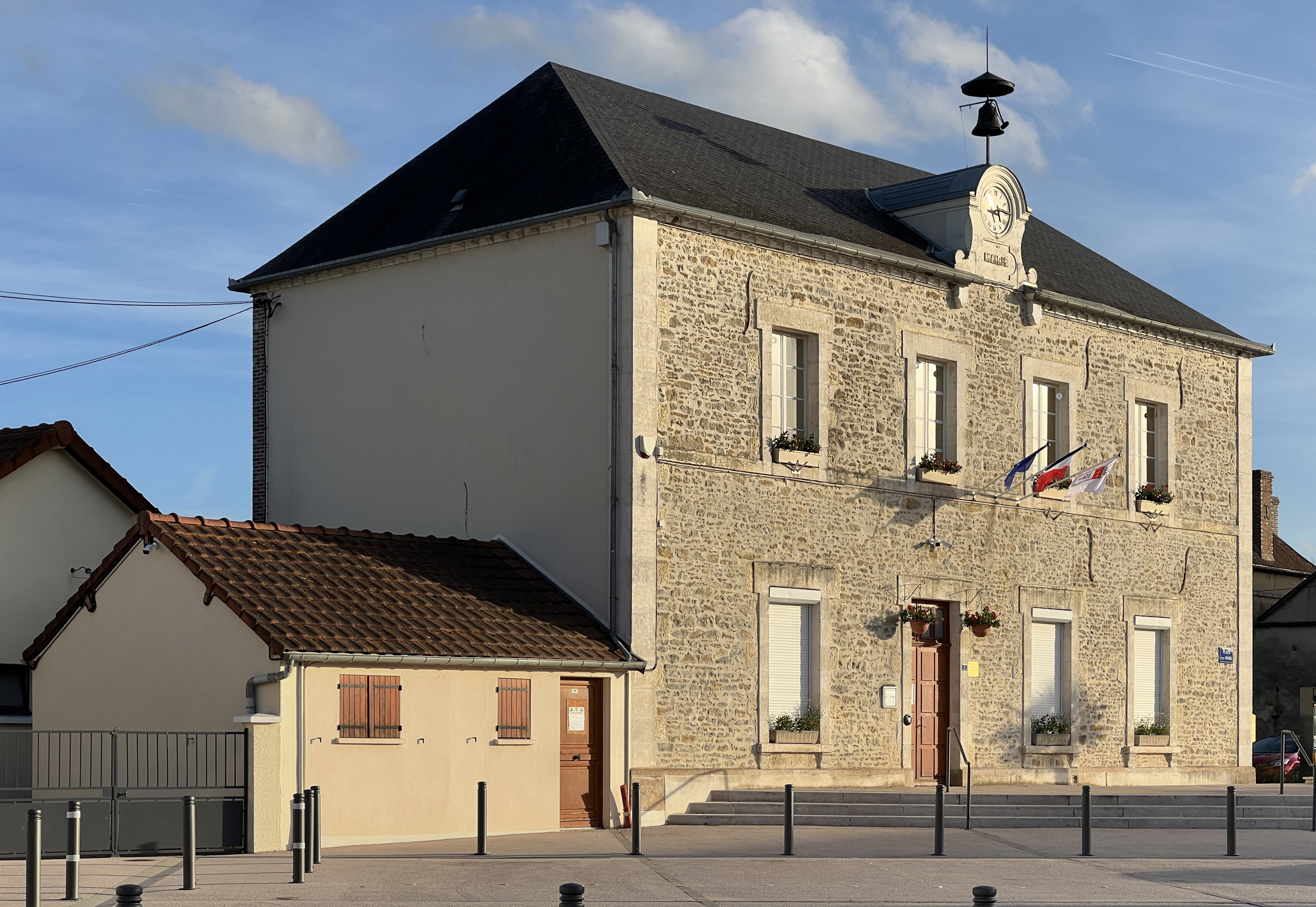
- Chéu Town hall

- Coat of arms
- Location of Chéu
- Location within France Location within Bourgogne-Franche-Comté
- Coordinates: 47°57′58″N 3°45′59″E
- Country: France
- Region: Bourgogne-Franche-Comté
- Department: Yonne
- Arrondissement: Auxerre
- Canton: Saint-Florentin

Government
  - Mayor (2020–2026): Maurice Hariot
- Area^{1}: 7.61 km^{2} (2.94 sq mi)
- Highest elevation: 120 m (390 ft)
- Lowest elevation: 100 m (330 ft)
- Population (2023): 522
  - Density: 68.6/km^{2} (178/sq mi)
- Time zone: UTC+01:00 (CET)
  - Summer (DST): UTC+02:00 (CEST)
- INSEE/Postal code: 89101 /89600
- ^{1} French Land Register data, which excludes lakes, ponds, glaciers > 1 km^{2} (0.386 sq mi or 247 acres) and river estuaries.

Chéu (French pronunciation: [ʃey]) is a commune in the Yonne department in Bourgogne-Franche-Comté in north-central France.

== See also ==
- Communes of the Yonne department
