= Héry, Yonne =

Héry
- Commune
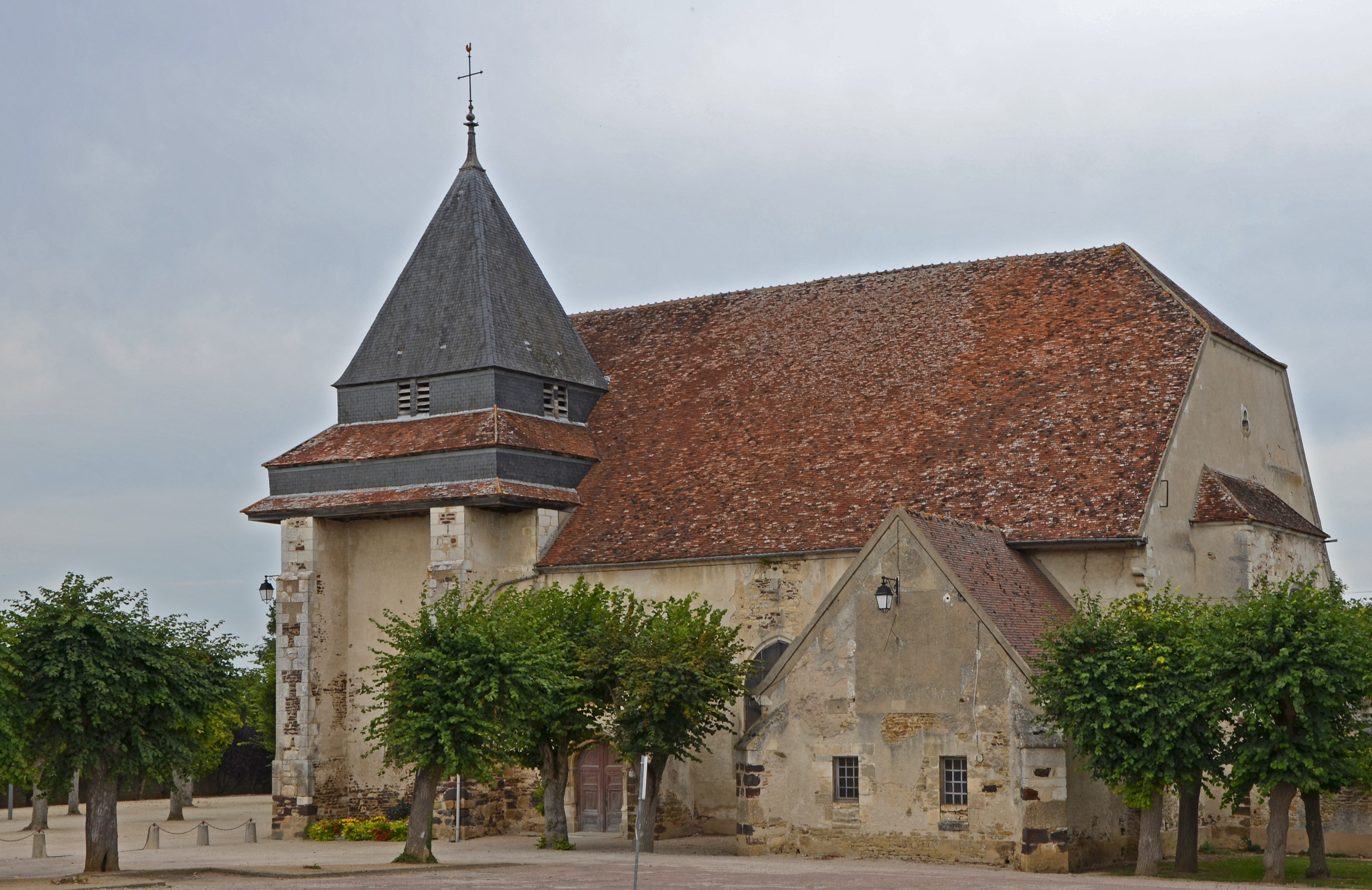
- The church in Héry

- Coat of arms
- Location of Héry
- Location within France Location within Bourgogne-Franche-Comté
- Coordinates: 47°54′07″N 3°37′37″E
- Country: France
- Region: Bourgogne-Franche-Comté
- Department: Yonne
- Arrondissement: Auxerre
- Canton: Saint-Florentin

Government
  - Mayor (2020–2026): Patrick Rousselle
- Area^{1}: 21.19 km^{2} (8.18 sq mi)
- Highest elevation: 192 m (630 ft)
- Lowest elevation: 94 m (308 ft)
- Population (2023): 1,784
  - Density: 84.19/km^{2} (218.1/sq mi)
- Time zone: UTC+01:00 (CET)
  - Summer (DST): UTC+02:00 (CEST)
- INSEE/Postal code: 89201 /89550
- ^{1} French Land Register data, which excludes lakes, ponds, glaciers > 1 km^{2} (0.386 sq mi or 247 acres) and river estuaries.

Héry (French pronunciation: [eʁi]) is a commune in the Yonne department in Bourgogne-Franche-Comté in north-central France.

== See also ==
- Communes of the Yonne department
