= Neuvy-Sautour =

- Commune
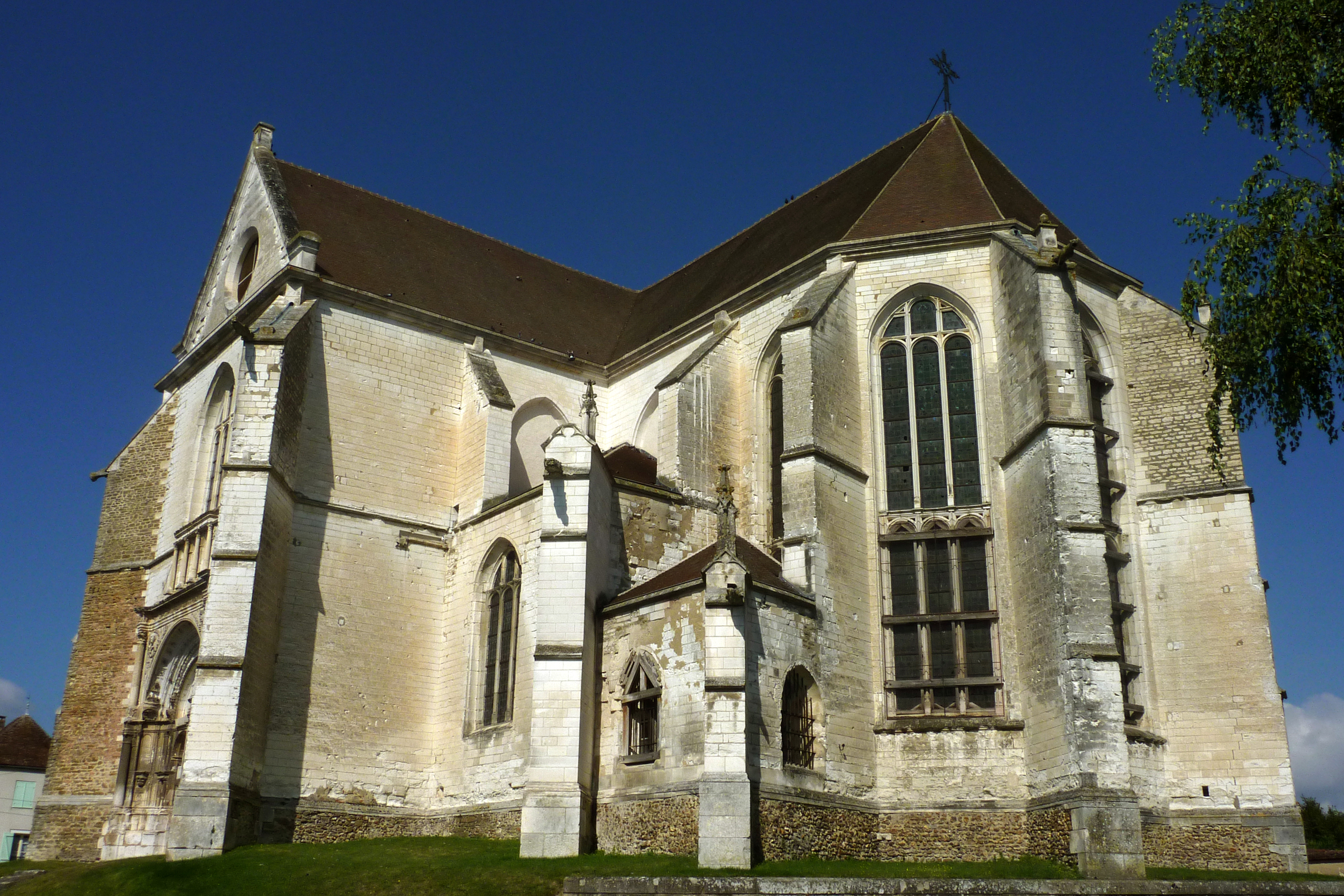
- The church in Neuvy-Sautour

- Coat of arms
- Location of Neuvy-Sautour
- Location within France Location within Bourgogne-Franche-Comté
- Coordinates: 48°02′33″N 3°47′41″E
- Country: France
- Region: Bourgogne-Franche-Comté
- Department: Yonne
- Arrondissement: Auxerre
- Canton: Saint-Florentin

Government
  - Mayor (2020–2026): Patrice Ramon
- Area^{1}: 19.06 km^{2} (7.36 sq mi)
- Highest elevation: 197 m (646 ft)
- Lowest elevation: 110 m (360 ft)
- Population (2023): 873
  - Density: 45.8/km^{2} (119/sq mi)
- Time zone: UTC+01:00 (CET)
  - Summer (DST): UTC+02:00 (CEST)
- INSEE/Postal code: 89276 /89570
- ^{1} French Land Register data, which excludes lakes, ponds, glaciers > 1 km^{2} (0.386 sq mi or 247 acres) and river estuaries.

Neuvy-Sautour (French pronunciation: [nøvi sotuʁ]) is a commune in the Yonne department in Bourgogne-Franche-Comté in north-central France.

== See also ==
- Communes of the Yonne department
