= Ormoy, Yonne =

Ormoy
- Commune
- Coat of arms
- Location of Ormoy
- Location within France Location within Bourgogne-Franche-Comté
- Coordinates: 47°57′18″N 3°34′25″E
- Country: France
- Region: Bourgogne-Franche-Comté
- Department: Yonne
- Arrondissement: Auxerre
- Canton: Saint-Florentin

Government
  - Mayor (2020–2026): Rémy Clérin
- Area^{1}: 13.33 km^{2} (5.15 sq mi)
- Highest elevation: 156 m (512 ft)
- Lowest elevation: 84 m (276 ft)
- Population (2023): 638
  - Density: 47.9/km^{2} (124/sq mi)
- Time zone: UTC+01:00 (CET)
  - Summer (DST): UTC+02:00 (CEST)
- INSEE/Postal code: 89282 /89400
- ^{1} French Land Register data, which excludes lakes, ponds, glaciers > 1 km^{2} (0.386 sq mi or 247 acres) and river estuaries.

Ormoy (French pronunciation: [ɔʁmwa]) is a commune in the Yonne department in Bourgogne-Franche-Comté in north-central France.

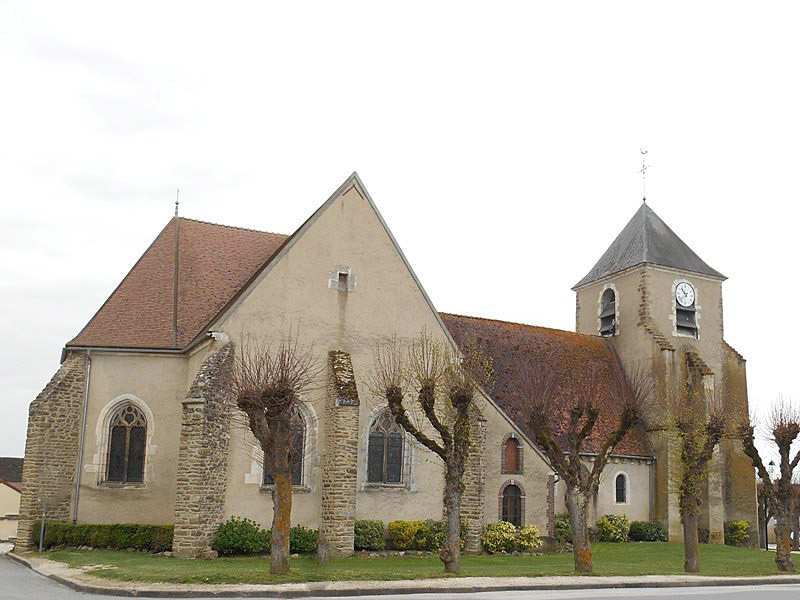
The church of St Peter's Chains

== See also ==
- Communes of the Yonne department
