= Turny =

- Commune
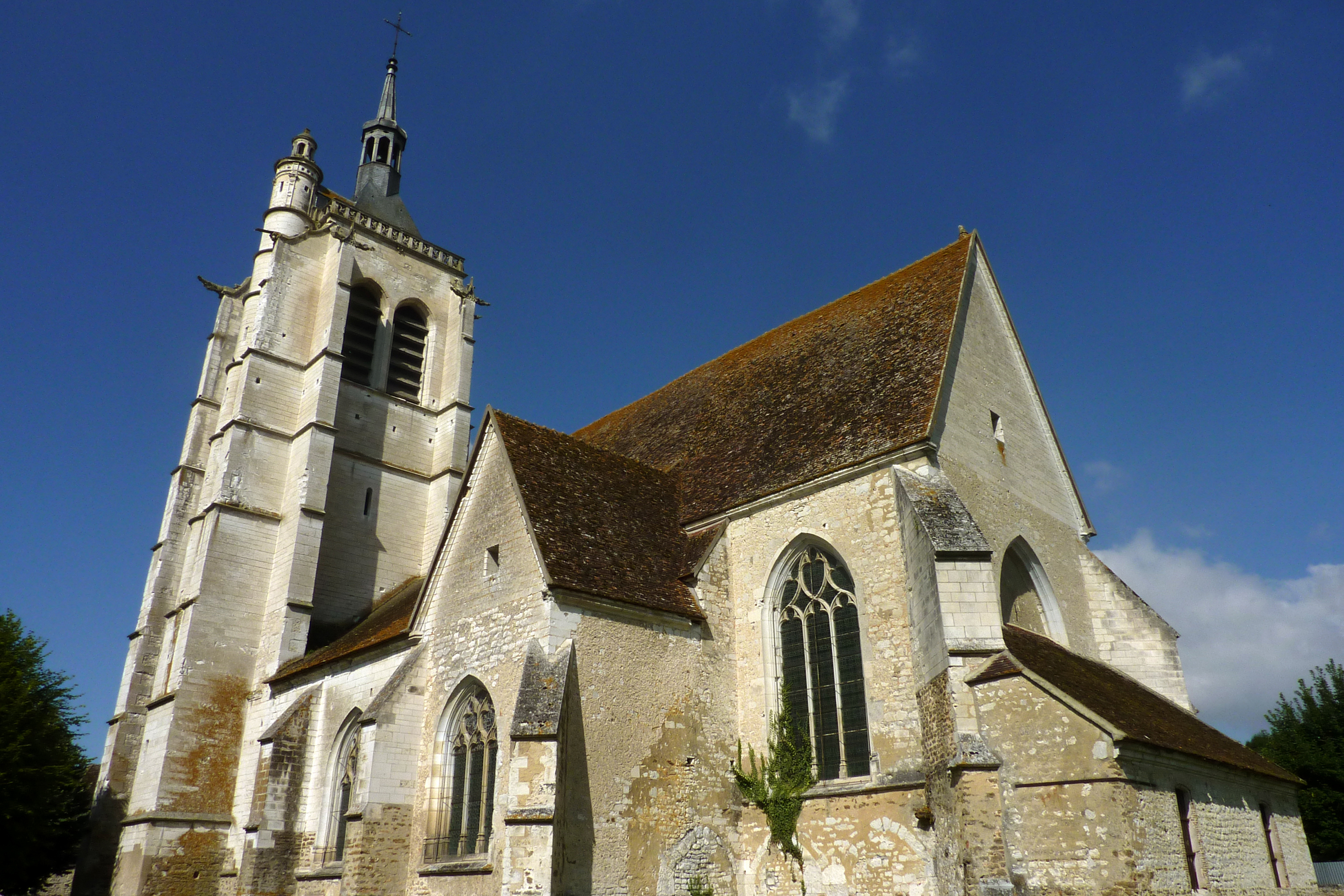
- The church in Turny

- Coat of arms
- Location of Turny
- Location within France Location within Bourgogne-Franche-Comté
- Coordinates: 48°02′09″N 3°44′50″E
- Country: France
- Region: Bourgogne-Franche-Comté
- Department: Yonne
- Arrondissement: Auxerre
- Canton: Saint-Florentin

Government
  - Mayor (2020–2026): Jean-Claude Chevalier
- Area^{1}: 24.87 km^{2} (9.60 sq mi)
- Highest elevation: 297 m (974 ft)
- Lowest elevation: 111 m (364 ft)
- Population (2023): 645
  - Density: 25.9/km^{2} (67.2/sq mi)
- Time zone: UTC+01:00 (CET)
  - Summer (DST): UTC+02:00 (CEST)
- INSEE/Postal code: 89425 /89570
- ^{1} French Land Register data, which excludes lakes, ponds, glaciers > 1 km^{2} (0.386 sq mi or 247 acres) and river estuaries.

Turny (French pronunciation: [tyʁni]) is a commune in the Yonne department in Bourgogne-Franche-Comté in north-central France.

== See also ==
- Communes of the Yonne department
