= Germigny, Yonne =

Germigny
- Commune
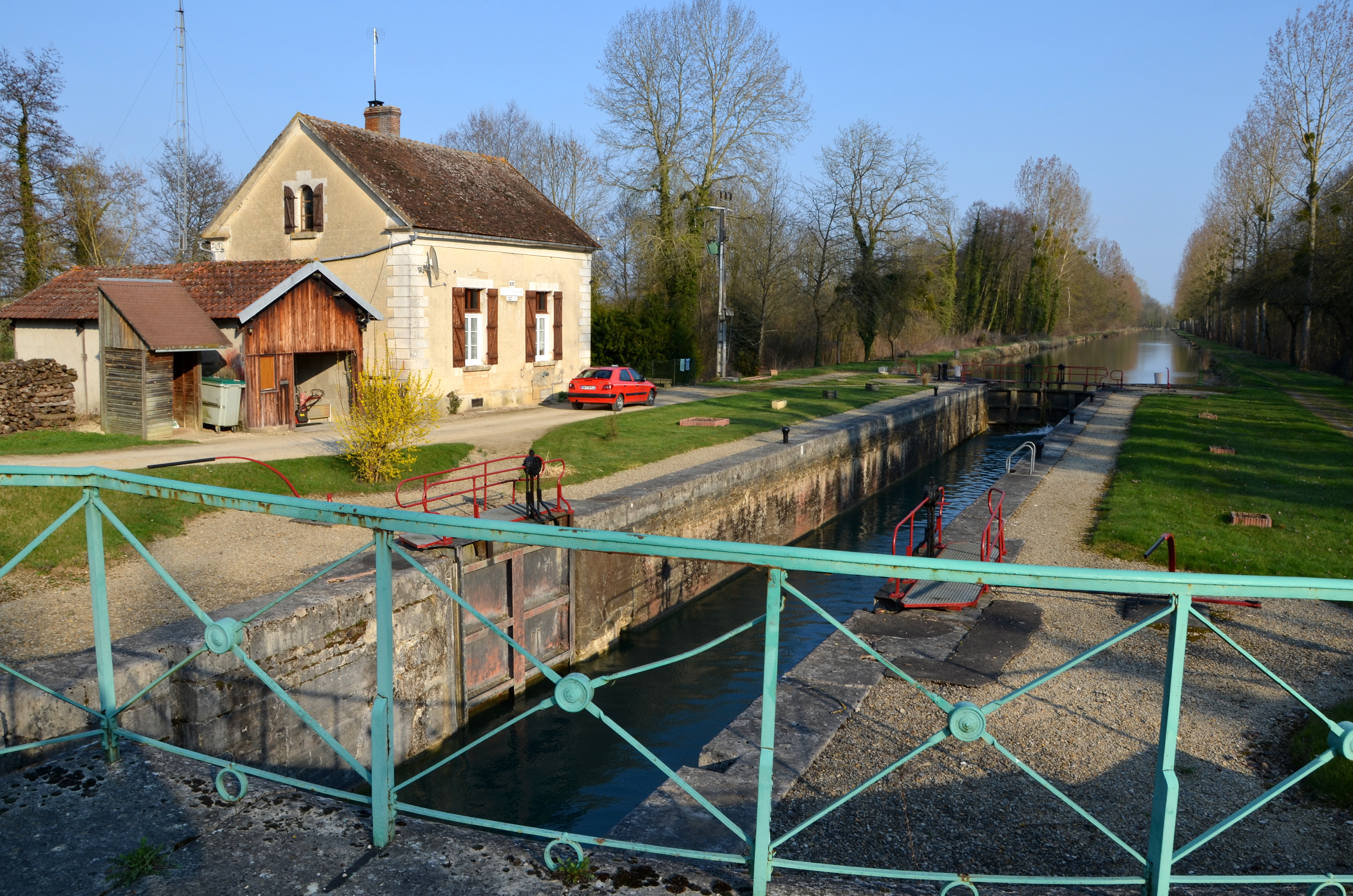
- The Egrevin lock of the Bourgogne canal in Germigny

- Coat of arms
- Location of Germigny
- Location within France Location within Bourgogne-Franche-Comté
- Coordinates: 47°59′44″N 3°46′54″E
- Country: France
- Region: Bourgogne-Franche-Comté
- Department: Yonne
- Arrondissement: Auxerre
- Canton: Saint-Florentin

Government
  - Mayor (2020–2026): Pascal Fournier
- Area^{1}: 11.87 km^{2} (4.58 sq mi)
- Highest elevation: 137 m (449 ft)
- Lowest elevation: 101 m (331 ft)
- Population (2023): 530
  - Density: 45/km^{2} (120/sq mi)
- Time zone: UTC+01:00 (CET)
  - Summer (DST): UTC+02:00 (CEST)
- INSEE/Postal code: 89186 /89600
- ^{1} French Land Register data, which excludes lakes, ponds, glaciers > 1 km^{2} (0.386 sq mi or 247 acres) and river estuaries.

Germigny (French pronunciation: [ʒɛʁmiɲi]) is a commune in the Yonne department in Bourgogne-Franche-Comté in north-central France.

== See also ==
- Communes of the Yonne department
