= Bussy-en-Othe =

- Commune
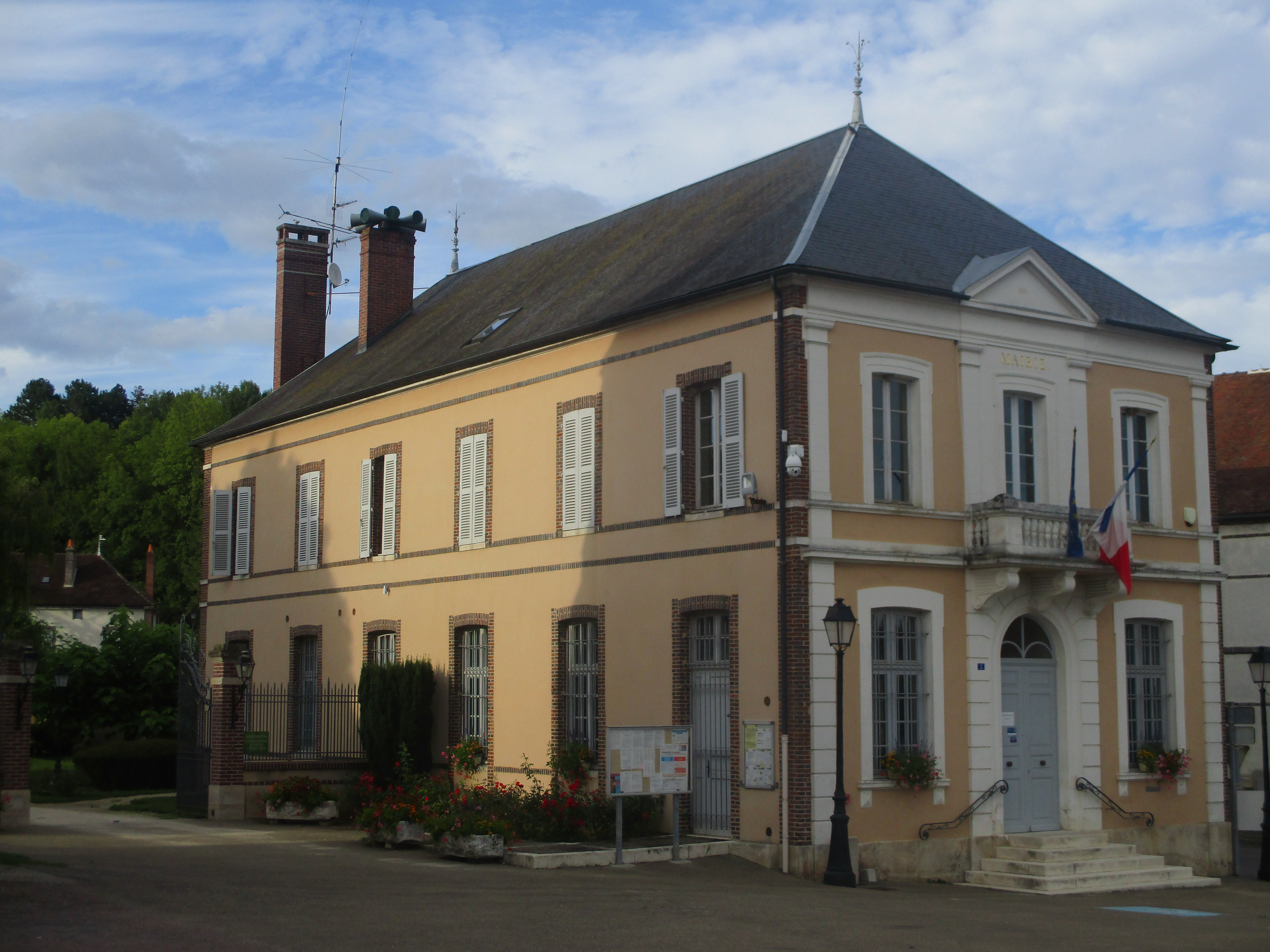
- The town hall in Bussy-en-Othe
- Location of Bussy-en-Othe
- Location within France Location within Bourgogne-Franche-Comté
- Coordinates: 48°01′12″N 3°30′55″E
- Country: France
- Region: Bourgogne-Franche-Comté
- Department: Yonne
- Arrondissement: Sens
- Canton: Migennes

Government
  - Mayor (2020–2026): Catherine Decuyper
- Area^{1}: 56.50 km^{2} (21.81 sq mi)
- Highest elevation: 266 m (873 ft)
- Lowest elevation: 100 m (330 ft)
- Population (2023): 698
  - Density: 12.4/km^{2} (32.0/sq mi)
- Time zone: UTC+01:00 (CET)
  - Summer (DST): UTC+02:00 (CEST)
- INSEE/Postal code: 89059 /89400
- ^{1} French Land Register data, which excludes lakes, ponds, glaciers > 1 km^{2} (0.386 sq mi or 247 acres) and river estuaries.

Bussy-en-Othe (French pronunciation: [bysi ɑ̃.n‿ɔt], lit. 'Bussy in Othe') is a commune in the Yonne department in Bourgogne-Franche-Comté in north-central France.

== See also ==
- Communes of the Yonne department
