= Chichery =

- Commune
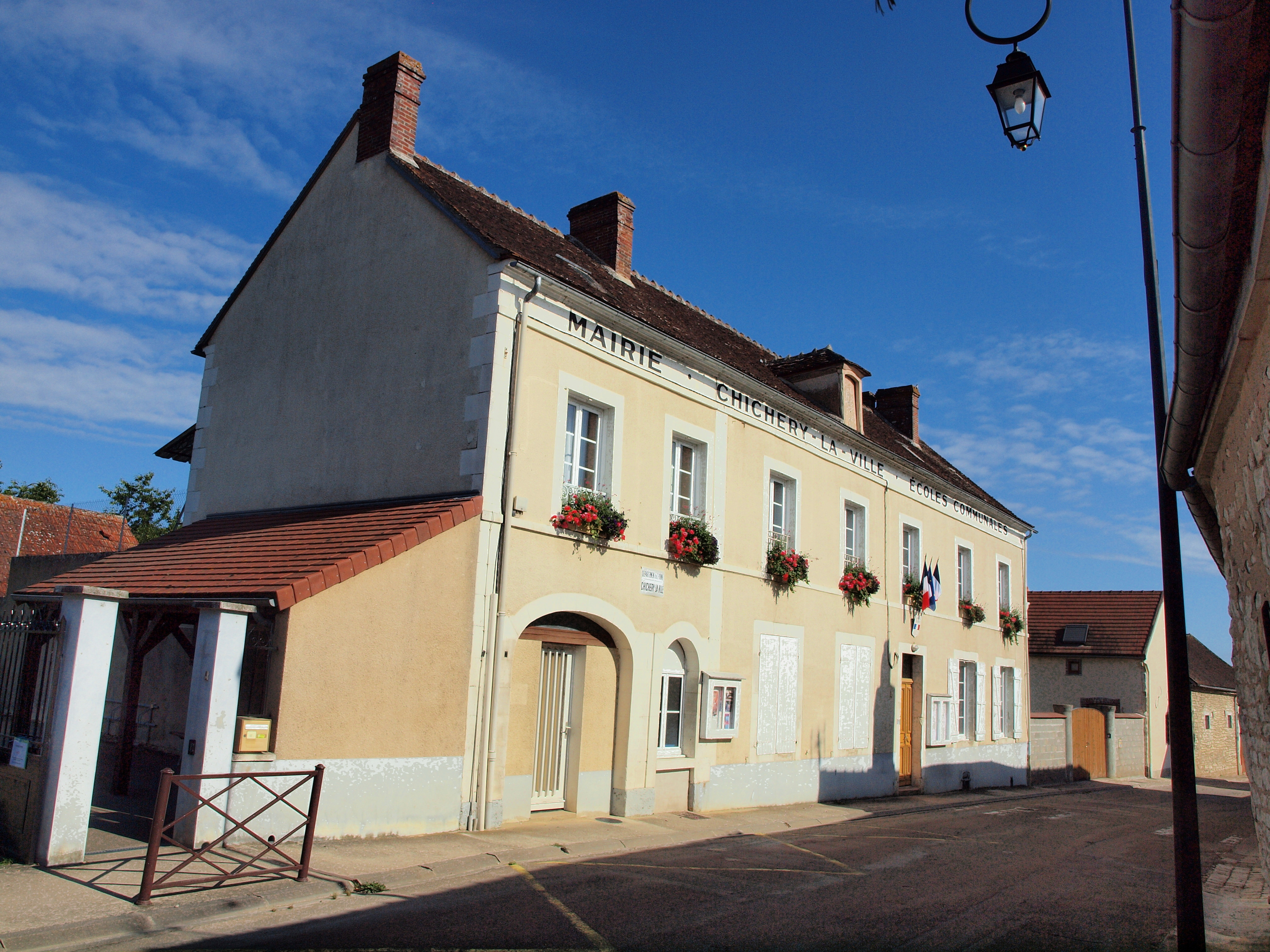
- The town hall in Chichery
- Location of Chichery
- Location within France Location within Bourgogne-Franche-Comté
- Coordinates: 47°54′12″N 3°30′39″E
- Country: France
- Region: Bourgogne-Franche-Comté
- Department: Yonne
- Arrondissement: Auxerre
- Canton: Migennes

Government
  - Mayor (2024–2026): Jean-Pierre Burat
- Area^{1}: 6.78 km^{2} (2.62 sq mi)
- Highest elevation: 195 m (640 ft)
- Lowest elevation: 83 m (272 ft)
- Population (2023): 426
  - Density: 62.8/km^{2} (163/sq mi)
- Time zone: UTC+01:00 (CET)
  - Summer (DST): UTC+02:00 (CEST)
- INSEE/Postal code: 89105 /89400
- ^{1} French Land Register data, which excludes lakes, ponds, glaciers > 1 km^{2} (0.386 sq mi or 247 acres) and river estuaries.

Chichery (French pronunciation: [ʃiʃʁi]) is a commune in the Yonne department in Bourgogne-Franche-Comté in north-central France.

== See also ==
- Communes of the Yonne department
