= Lasson, Yonne =

Lasson
- Commune
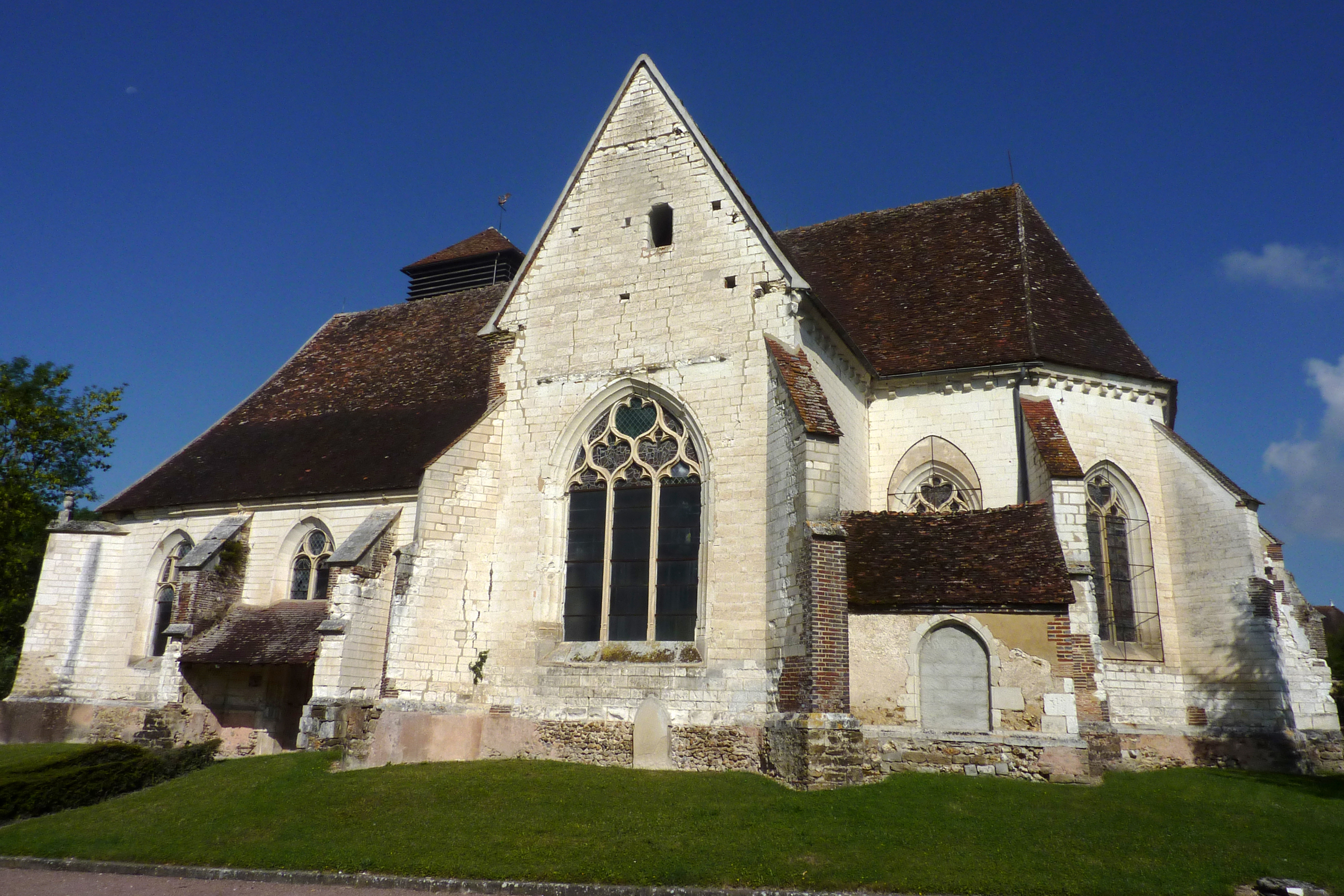
- The church in Lasson
- Location of Lasson
- Location within France Location within Bourgogne-Franche-Comté
- Coordinates: 48°03′34″N 3°49′03″E
- Country: France
- Region: Bourgogne-Franche-Comté
- Department: Yonne
- Arrondissement: Auxerre
- Canton: Saint-Florentin

Government
  - Mayor (2020–2026): Patrice Baillet
- Area^{1}: 7.07 km^{2} (2.73 sq mi)
- Highest elevation: 200 m (660 ft)
- Lowest elevation: 130 m (430 ft)
- Population (2023): 141
  - Density: 19.9/km^{2} (51.7/sq mi)
- Time zone: UTC+01:00 (CET)
  - Summer (DST): UTC+02:00 (CEST)
- INSEE/Postal code: 89219 /89570
- ^{1} French Land Register data, which excludes lakes, ponds, glaciers > 1 km^{2} (0.386 sq mi or 247 acres) and river estuaries.

Lasson (French pronunciation: [lasɔ̃]) is a commune in the Yonne department in Bourgogne-Franche-Comté in north-central France.

== See also ==
- Communes of the Yonne department
