= Beaumont, Yonne =

Beaumont
- Commune
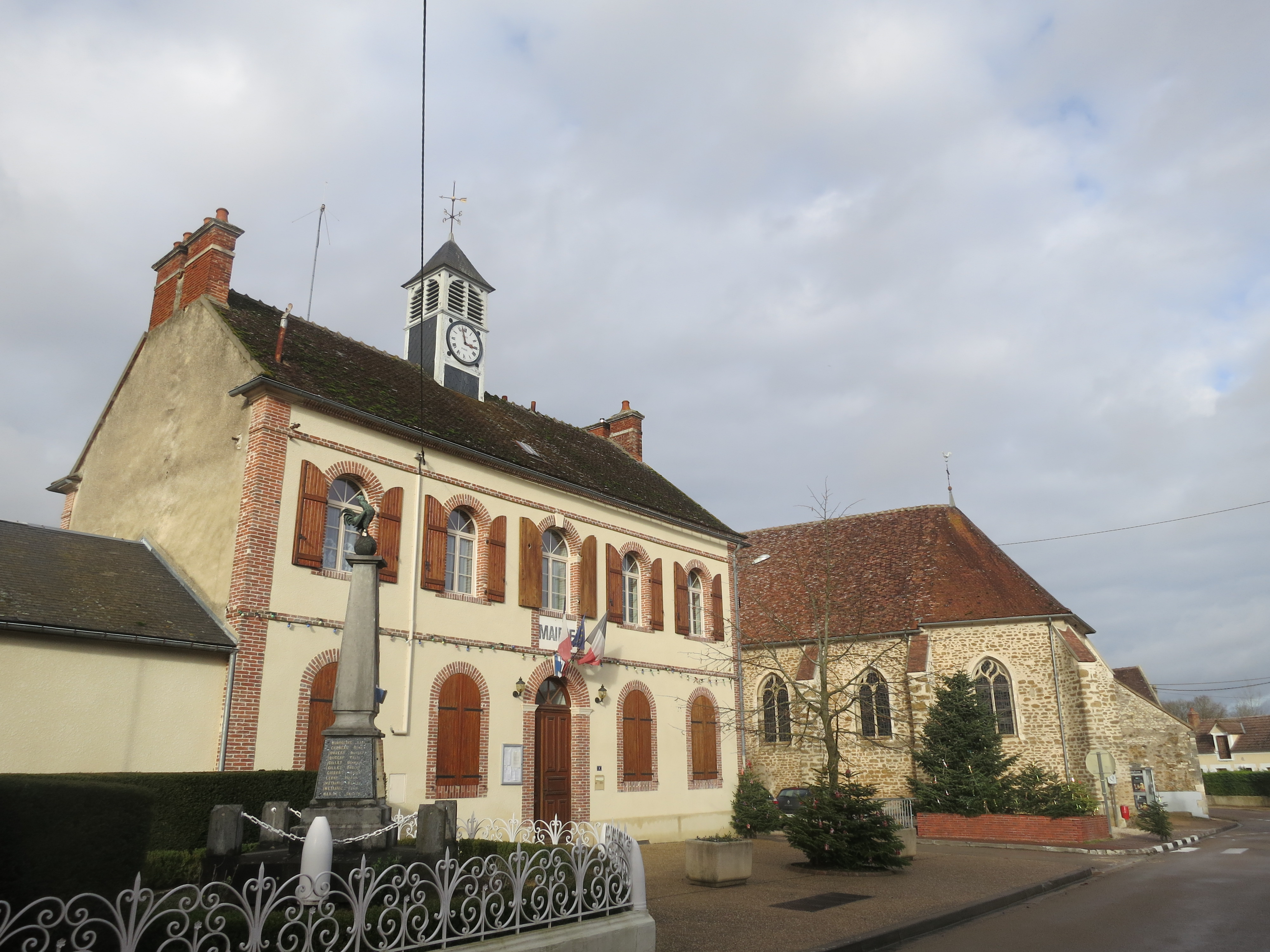
- The town hall in Beaumont

- Coat of arms
- Location of Beaumont
- Location within France Location within Bourgogne-Franche-Comté
- Coordinates: 47°55′12″N 3°33′41″E
- Country: France
- Region: Bourgogne-Franche-Comté
- Department: Yonne
- Arrondissement: Auxerre
- Canton: Saint-Florentin
- Area^{1}: 6.55 km^{2} (2.53 sq mi)
- Highest elevation: 128 m (420 ft)
- Lowest elevation: 83 m (272 ft)
- Population (2023): 618
  - Density: 94.4/km^{2} (244/sq mi)
- Time zone: UTC+01:00 (CET)
  - Summer (DST): UTC+02:00 (CEST)
- INSEE/Postal code: 89031 /89250
- ^{1} French Land Register data, which excludes lakes, ponds, glaciers > 1 km^{2} (0.386 sq mi or 247 acres) and river estuaries.

Beaumont (French pronunciation: [bomɔ̃]) is a commune in the Yonne department in Bourgogne-Franche-Comté in north-central France.

== See also ==
- Communes of the Yonne department
