= Épineau-les-Voves =

- Commune
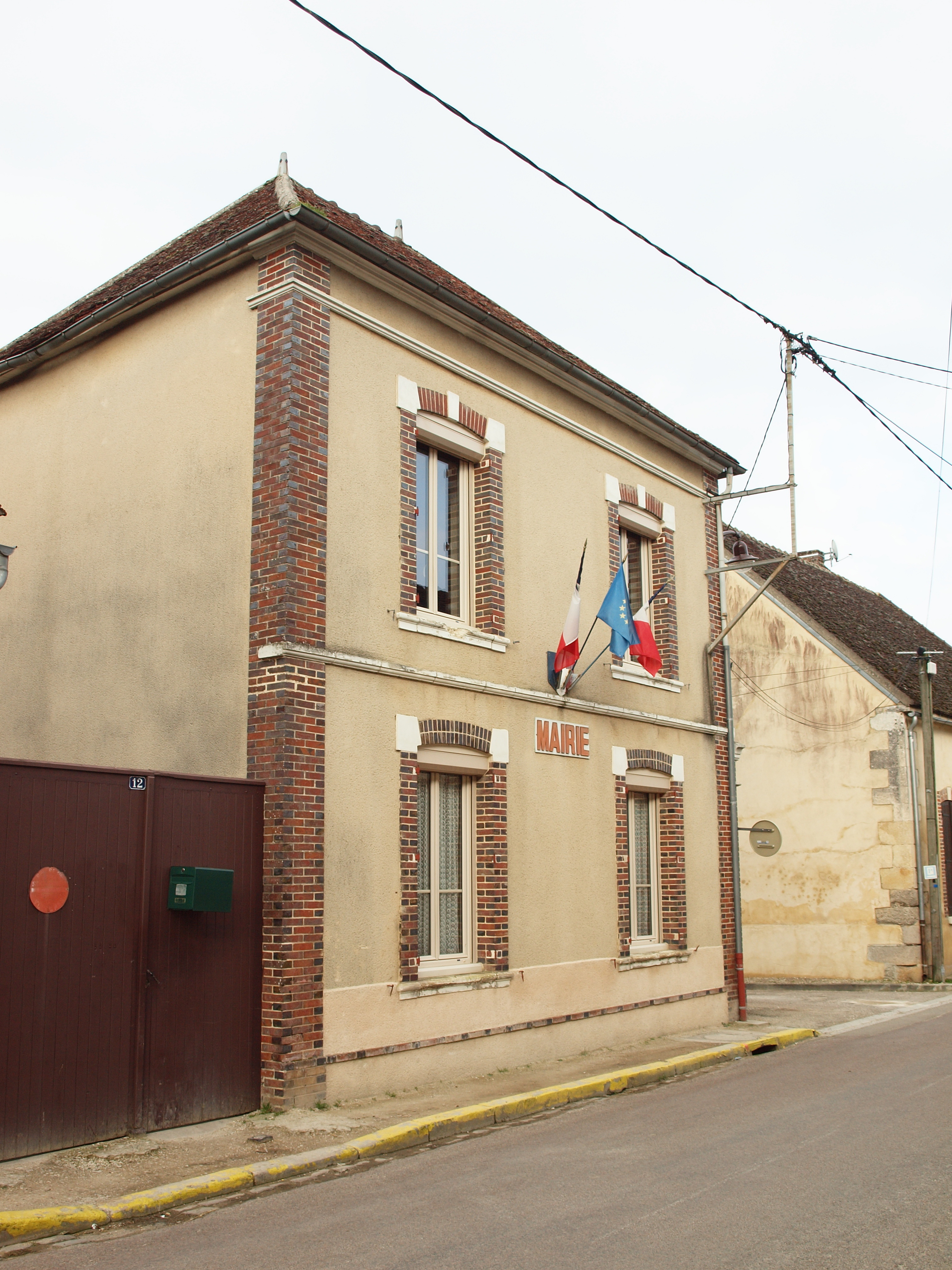
- The town hall in Épineau-les-Voves
- Location of Épineau-les-Voves
- Location within France Location within Bourgogne-Franche-Comté
- Coordinates: 47°56′50″N 3°28′24″E
- Country: France
- Region: Bourgogne-Franche-Comté
- Department: Yonne
- Arrondissement: Auxerre
- Canton: Migennes

Government
  - Mayor (2020–2026): Ghislaine Bruneau
- Area^{1}: 7.05 km^{2} (2.72 sq mi)
- Highest elevation: 147 m (482 ft)
- Lowest elevation: 78 m (256 ft)
- Population (2023): 708
  - Density: 100/km^{2} (260/sq mi)
- Time zone: UTC+01:00 (CET)
  - Summer (DST): UTC+02:00 (CEST)
- INSEE/Postal code: 89152 /89400
- ^{1} French Land Register data, which excludes lakes, ponds, glaciers > 1 km^{2} (0.386 sq mi or 247 acres) and river estuaries.

Épineau-les-Voves (French pronunciation: [epino le vɔv]) is a commune in the Yonne department in Bourgogne-Franche-Comté in north-central France.

== See also ==
- Communes of the Yonne department
