= Chemilly-sur-Yonne =

- Commune
- Coat of arms
- Location of Chemilly-sur-Yonne
- Location within France Location within Bourgogne-Franche-Comté
- Coordinates: 47°53′57″N 3°33′45″E
- Country: France
- Region: Bourgogne-Franche-Comté
- Department: Yonne
- Arrondissement: Auxerre
- Canton: Saint-Florentin

Government
  - Mayor (2020–2026): Didier Morlé
- Area^{1}: 5.72 km^{2} (2.21 sq mi)
- Highest elevation: 134 m (440 ft)
- Lowest elevation: 84 m (276 ft)
- Population (2023): 887
  - Density: 155/km^{2} (402/sq mi)
- Time zone: UTC+01:00 (CET)
  - Summer (DST): UTC+02:00 (CEST)
- INSEE/Postal code: 89096 /89250
- ^{1} French Land Register data, which excludes lakes, ponds, glaciers > 1 km^{2} (0.386 sq mi or 247 acres) and river estuaries.

Chemilly-sur-Yonne (French pronunciation: [ʃəmiji syʁ jɔn], literally Chemilly on Yonne) is a commune in the Yonne department in Bourgogne-Franche-Comté in north-central France.

== See also ==
- Communes of the Yonne department
