= Jaulges =

- Commune
- Coat of arms
- Location of Jaulges
- Location within France Location within Bourgogne-Franche-Comté
- Coordinates: 47°57′48″N 3°47′28″E
- Country: France
- Region: Bourgogne-Franche-Comté
- Department: Yonne
- Arrondissement: Auxerre
- Canton: Saint-Florentin
- Area^{1}: 12.35 km^{2} (4.77 sq mi)
- Highest elevation: 141 m (463 ft)
- Lowest elevation: 103 m (338 ft)
- Population (2023): 418
  - Density: 33.8/km^{2} (87.7/sq mi)
- Time zone: UTC+01:00 (CET)
  - Summer (DST): UTC+02:00 (CEST)
- INSEE/Postal code: 89205 /89360
- ^{1} French Land Register data, which excludes lakes, ponds, glaciers > 1 km^{2} (0.386 sq mi or 247 acres) and river estuaries.

Jaulges (French pronunciation: [ʒolʒ]) is a commune in the Yonne department in Bourgogne-Franche-Comté in north-central France.

== See also ==
- Communes of the Yonne department
