= Hauterive, Yonne =

Hauterive
- Commune
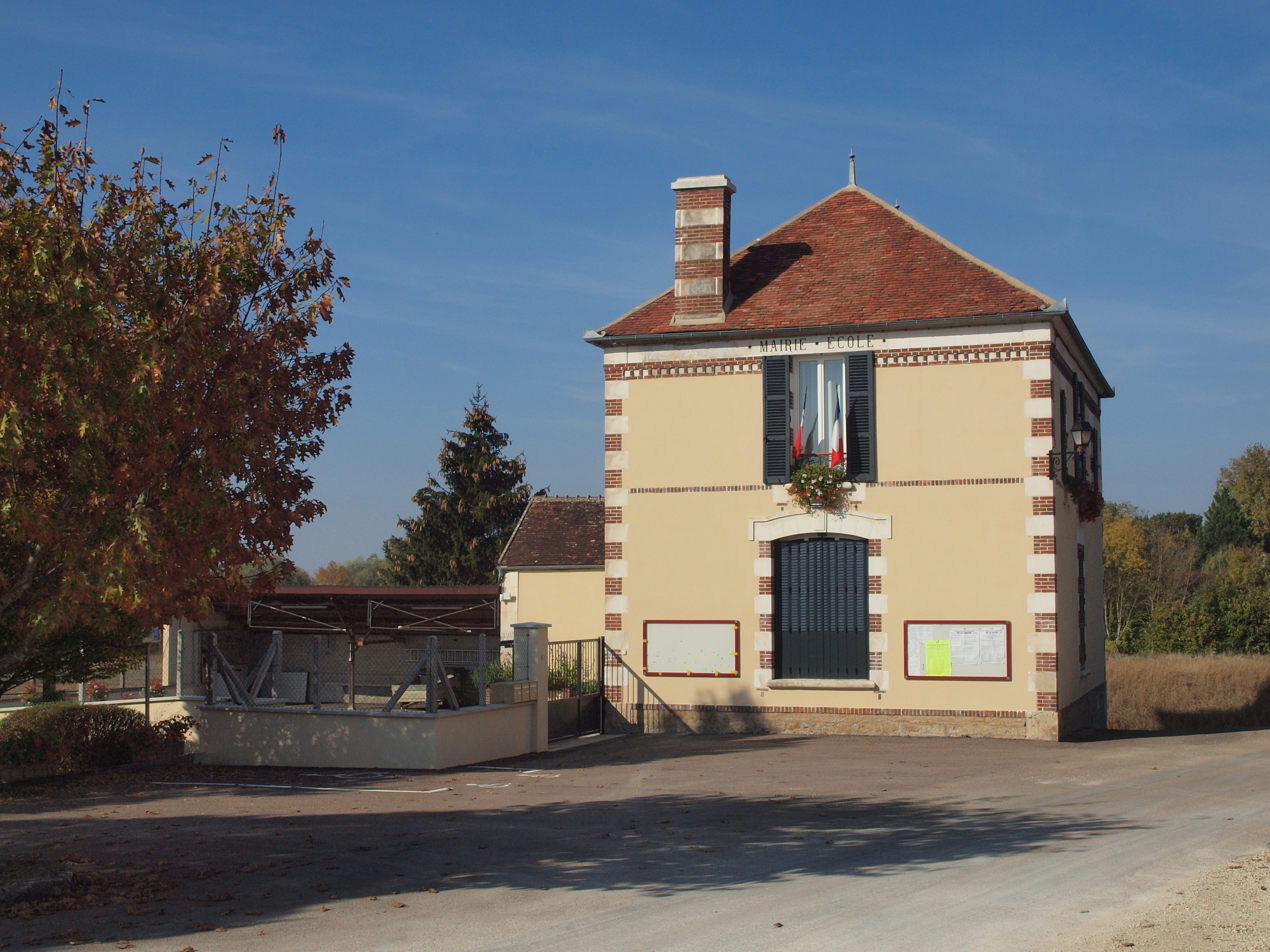
- The town hall in Hauterive

- Coat of arms
- Location of Hauterive
- Location within France Location within Bourgogne-Franche-Comté
- Coordinates: 47°55′35″N 3°36′00″E
- Country: France
- Region: Bourgogne-Franche-Comté
- Department: Yonne
- Arrondissement: Auxerre
- Canton: Saint-Florentin
- Area^{1}: 9.56 km^{2} (3.69 sq mi)
- Highest elevation: 156 m (512 ft)
- Lowest elevation: 88 m (289 ft)
- Population (2023): 390
  - Density: 41/km^{2} (110/sq mi)
- Time zone: UTC+01:00 (CET)
  - Summer (DST): UTC+02:00 (CEST)
- INSEE/Postal code: 89200 /89250
- ^{1} French Land Register data, which excludes lakes, ponds, glaciers > 1 km^{2} (0.386 sq mi or 247 acres) and river estuaries.

Hauterive (French pronunciation: [otʁiv]) is a commune in the Yonne department in Bourgogne-Franche-Comté in north-central France.

== See also ==
- Communes of the Yonne department
