= Mont-Saint-Sulpice =

- Commune
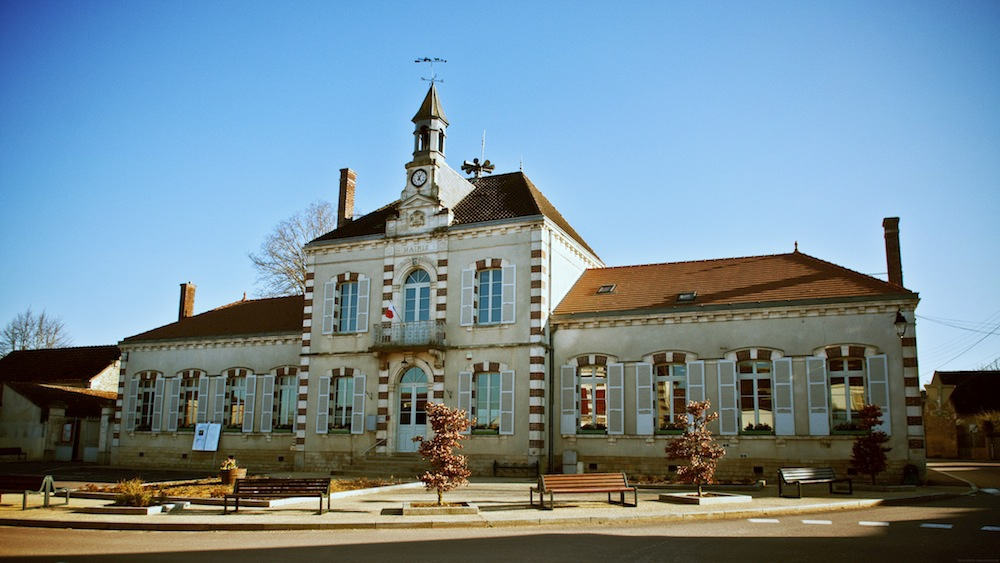
- The town hall in Mont-Saint-Sulpice

- Coat of arms
- Location of Mont-Saint-Sulpice
- Location within France Location within Bourgogne-Franche-Comté
- Coordinates: 47°57′10″N 3°37′37″E
- Country: France
- Region: Bourgogne-Franche-Comté
- Department: Yonne
- Arrondissement: Auxerre
- Canton: Saint-Florentin

Government
  - Mayor (2020–2026): Jacky Jussot
- Area^{1}: 19.62 km^{2} (7.58 sq mi)
- Highest elevation: 192 m (630 ft)
- Lowest elevation: 87 m (285 ft)
- Population (2023): 781
  - Density: 39.8/km^{2} (103/sq mi)
- Time zone: UTC+01:00 (CET)
  - Summer (DST): UTC+02:00 (CEST)
- INSEE/Postal code: 89268 /89250
- ^{1} French Land Register data, which excludes lakes, ponds, glaciers > 1 km^{2} (0.386 sq mi or 247 acres) and river estuaries.

Mont-Saint-Sulpice (French pronunciation: [mɔ̃ sɛ̃ sylpis]) is a commune in the Yonne department in Bourgogne-Franche-Comté in north-central France.

== See also ==
- Communes of the Yonne department
