= Chailley =

- Commune
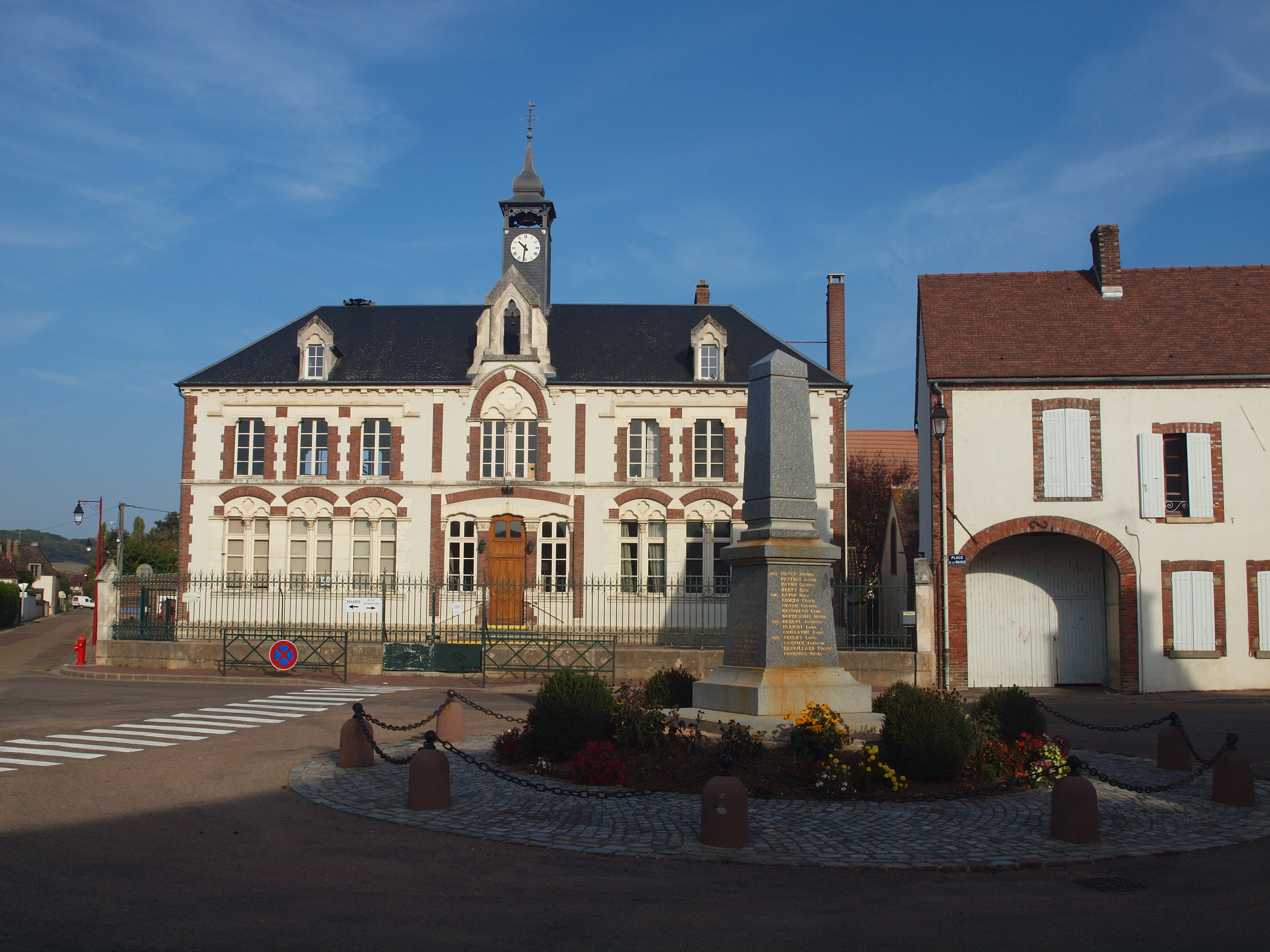
- The town hall and war memorial in Chailley

- Coat of arms
- Location of Chailley
- Location within France Location within Bourgogne-Franche-Comté
- Coordinates: 48°05′01″N 3°42′07″E
- Country: France
- Region: Bourgogne-Franche-Comté
- Department: Yonne
- Arrondissement: Auxerre
- Canton: Saint-Florentin

Government
  - Mayor (2020–2026): Philippe Guinet-Baudin
- Area^{1}: 16.51 km^{2} (6.37 sq mi)
- Highest elevation: 280 m (920 ft)
- Lowest elevation: 143 m (469 ft)
- Population (2023): 533
  - Density: 32.3/km^{2} (83.6/sq mi)
- Time zone: UTC+01:00 (CET)
  - Summer (DST): UTC+02:00 (CEST)
- INSEE/Postal code: 89069 /89770
- ^{1} French Land Register data, which excludes lakes, ponds, glaciers > 1 km^{2} (0.386 sq mi or 247 acres) and river estuaries.

Chailley (French pronunciation: [ʃajɛ]) is a commune in the Yonne department in Bourgogne-Franche-Comté in north-central France.

== See also ==
- Communes of the Yonne department
