= Bonnard, Yonne =

Bonnard
- Commune
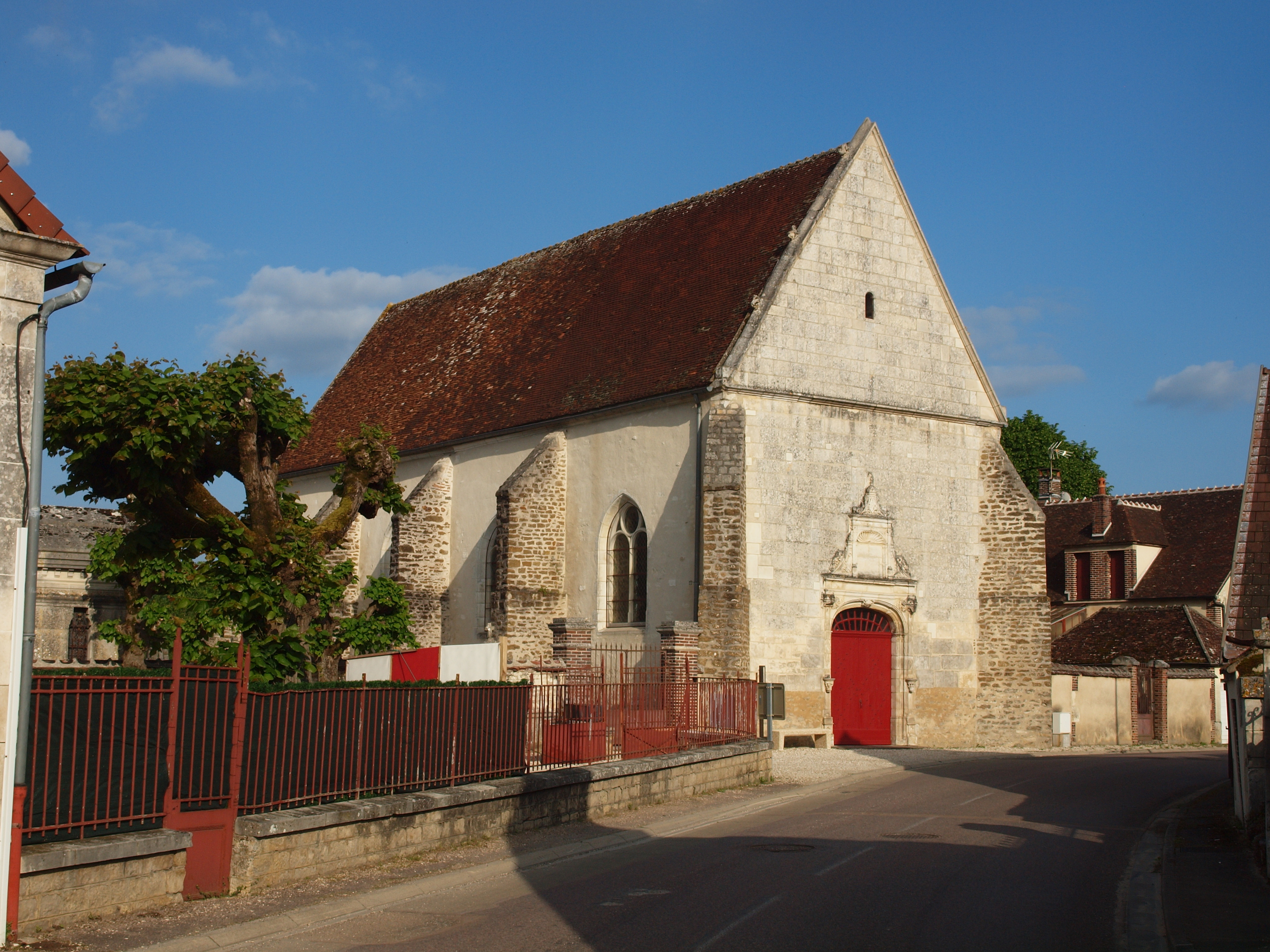
- The church in Bonnard
- Location of Bonnard
- Location within France Location within Bourgogne-Franche-Comté
- Coordinates: 47°55′37″N 3°31′25″E
- Country: France
- Region: Bourgogne-Franche-Comté
- Department: Yonne
- Arrondissement: Auxerre
- Canton: Migennes

Government
  - Mayor (2020–2026): Jean-Luc Warie
- Area^{1}: 4.02 km^{2} (1.55 sq mi)
- Highest elevation: 104 m (341 ft)
- Lowest elevation: 83 m (272 ft)
- Population (2023): 909
  - Density: 226/km^{2} (586/sq mi)
- Time zone: UTC+01:00 (CET)
  - Summer (DST): UTC+02:00 (CEST)
- INSEE/Postal code: 89050 /89400
- ^{1} French Land Register data, which excludes lakes, ponds, glaciers > 1 km^{2} (0.386 sq mi or 247 acres) and river estuaries.

Bonnard (French pronunciation: [bɔnaʁ]) is a commune in the Yonne department in Bourgogne-Franche-Comté in north-central France.

== See also ==
- Communes of the Yonne department
