= Charmoy, Yonne =

Charmoy
- Commune
- Location of Charmoy
- Location within France Location within Bourgogne-Franche-Comté
- Coordinates: 47°56′32″N 3°29′33″E
- Country: France
- Region: Bourgogne-Franche-Comté
- Department: Yonne
- Arrondissement: Auxerre
- Canton: Migennes

Government
  - Mayor (2020–2026): Mariane Suzanne
- Area^{1}: 7.02 km^{2} (2.71 sq mi)
- Highest elevation: 147 m (482 ft)
- Lowest elevation: 80 m (260 ft)
- Population (2023): 1,104
  - Density: 157/km^{2} (407/sq mi)
- Time zone: UTC+01:00 (CET)
  - Summer (DST): UTC+02:00 (CEST)
- INSEE/Postal code: 89085 /89400
- ^{1} French Land Register data, which excludes lakes, ponds, glaciers > 1 km^{2} (0.386 sq mi or 247 acres) and river estuaries.

Charmoy (French pronunciation: [ʃaʁmwa]) is a commune in the Yonne department in Bourgogne-Franche-Comté in north-central France.

== See also ==
- Communes of the Yonne department
