= Saint-Florentin, Yonne =

Saint-Florentin
- Commune
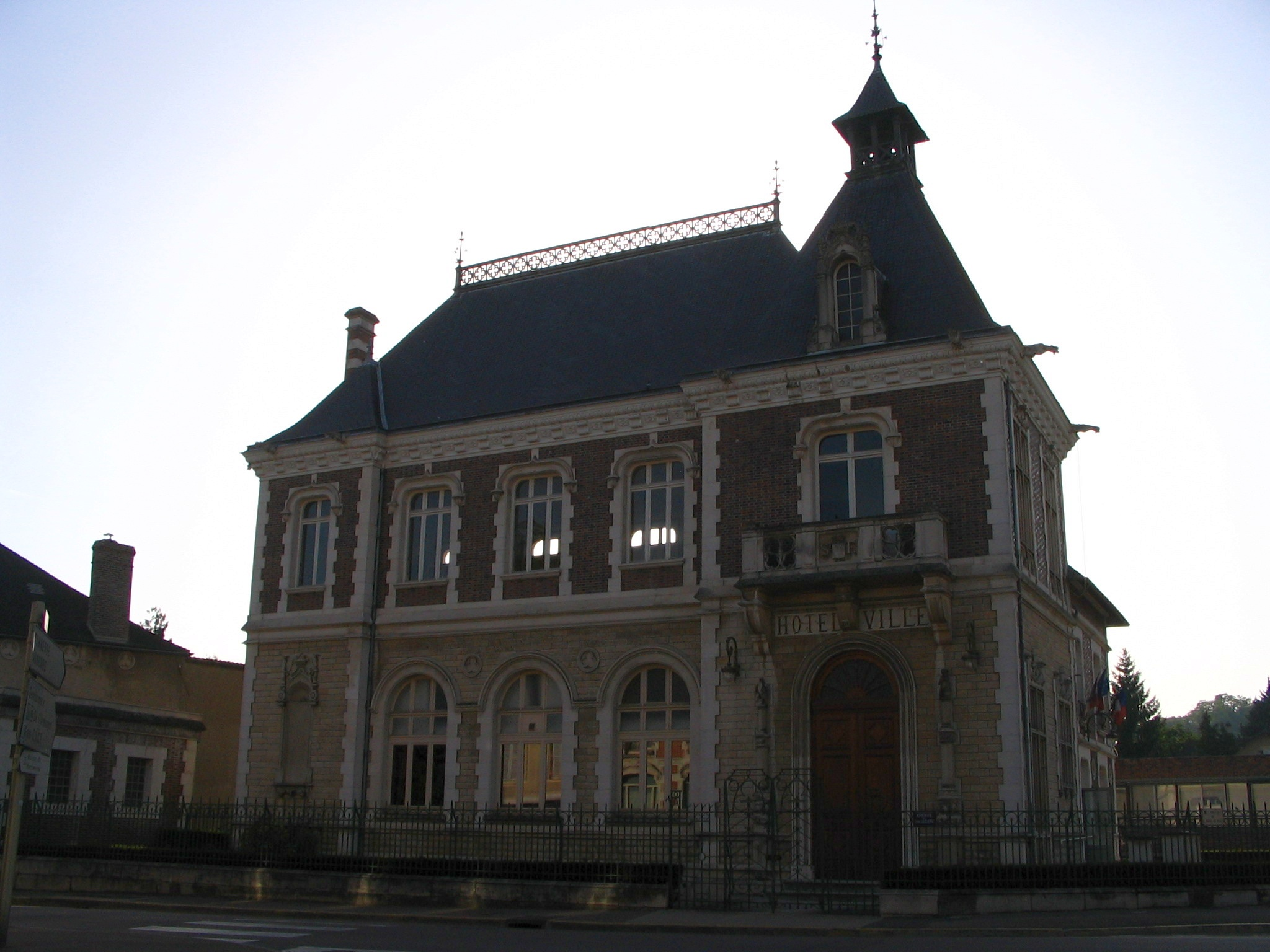
- The town hall in Saint-Florentin

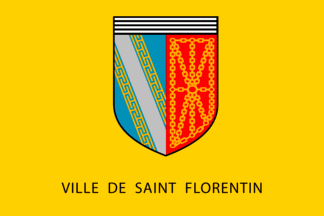
- Flag Coat of arms
- Location of Saint-Florentin
- Location within France Location within Bourgogne-Franche-Comté
- Coordinates: 48°00′09″N 3°43′33″E
- Country: France
- Region: Bourgogne-Franche-Comté
- Department: Yonne
- Arrondissement: Auxerre
- Canton: Saint-Florentin

Government
  - Mayor (2020–2026): Yves Delot
- Area^{1}: 28.6 km^{2} (11.0 sq mi)
- Elevation: 200 m (660 ft)
- Highest elevation: 192 m (630 ft)
- Lowest elevation: 89 m (292 ft)
- Population (2023): 4,164
  - Density: 146/km^{2} (377/sq mi)
- Time zone: UTC+01:00 (CET)
  - Summer (DST): UTC+02:00 (CEST)
- INSEE/Postal code: 89345 /89600
- ^{1} French Land Register data, which excludes lakes, ponds, glaciers > 1 km^{2} (0.386 sq mi or 247 acres) and river estuaries.

Saint-Florentin (French pronunciation: [sɛ̃ flɔʁɑ̃tɛ̃]) is a commune in the Yonne department in Bourgogne-Franche-Comté in north-central France. It lies at the confluence of the rivers Armançon and Armance, and on the Canal de Bourgogne.

== Population ==
Historical population
Year	Pop.	±% p.a.
1968	5,818	—
1975	7,000	+2.68%
1982	6,757	−0.50%
1990	6,433	−0.61%
1999	5,748	−1.24%
2007	4,993	−1.74%
2012	4,733	−1.06%
2017	4,362	−1.62%
2023	4,164	−0.77%
Source: INSEE

== Twin towns ==
Saint-Florentin is twinned with Zeltingen-Rachtig, Rhineland-Palatinate, Germany.

== See also ==
- Communes of the Yonne department
