= Canton of Migennes =

Coordinates: 47.97°N 3.51°E

The canton of Migennes is an administrative division of the Yonne department, central France. Its borders were modified at the French canton reorganisation which came into effect in March 2015. Its seat is in Migennes.

It consists of the following communes:

1. Bassou
2. Bonnard
3. Brion
4. Bussy-en-Othe
5. Charmoy
6. Cheny
7. Chichery
8. Épineau-les-Voves
9. Laroche-Saint-Cydroine
10. Migennes
