= Canton of Saint-Florentin =

Coordinates: 48.00°N 3.73°E

The canton of Saint-Florentin is an administrative division of the Yonne department, central France. Its borders were modified at the French canton reorganisation which came into effect in March 2015. Its seat is in Saint-Florentin.

It consists of the following communes:

1. Beaumont
2. Beugnon
3. Butteaux
4. Chailley
5. Chemilly-sur-Yonne
6. Chéu
7. Germigny
8. Hauterive
9. Héry
10. Jaulges
11. Lasson
12. Mont-Saint-Sulpice
13. Neuvy-Sautour
14. Ormoy
15. Percey
16. Saint-Florentin
17. Seignelay
18. Sormery
19. Soumaintrain
20. Turny
21. Vergigny
22. Villiers-Vineux
