= Serein (disambiguation) =

The Serein is a river in eastern France.

Serein may also refer to:

- Serein (meteorology), rain falling from a cloudless sky
- "Serein" (song), by Katatonia, 2016
- Syrah or sereine, a variety of grape
