= La Chablisienne =

- Location: 8 Boulevard Pasteur, Chablis, Yonne, France
- Coordinates: 47.812508°N 3.796064°E
- Wine region: Burgundy
- Appellation: chablis
- Founded: 1923
- Acres cultivated: 1,250 hectares (3,100 acres)
- Known for: Chablis Grand Cru
- Varietal: Chardonnay
- Distribution: International
- Tasting: Open to public, group tours available on request
- Website: chablisienne.com/en

La Chablisienne is a wine cooperative located in Chablis, in the department of Yonne, France. It is the main wine producer in the department, supplying more than 25% of the volume of Chablis production. Chablis white wine is a significant part of Burgundy wine region.

In 2014, Vincent Bartement, oenologist from la Chablisienne, is awarded IWC White Winemaker of the Year, by the International Wine Challenge.

As of 2018, more than 250 producers are members of the cooperative. The turnover is € 50 million, for a profit of €2 million.

== History ==
The first producers' cooperative in Chablis dates from 1 May 1923, under the name 'Société coopérative La Chablisienne'. Its creation corresponds to a period of economic difficulties, the sale of wine being difficult during the inter-war period. On 14 August 1928, the SARL "La Cave Chablisienne" was created; the two merged on 23 March 1947 to form the "Cave Coopérative La Chablisienne", selling less and less to the wine trade.

Since 1993, La Chablisienne, the Caves Bailly Lapierre (Yonne), the Cave des Hautes Côtes (Côte-d'Or), the Cave des Vignerons de Buxy (Côte Chalonnaise) and the Vignerons des Terres Secrètes (Mâconnais) have joined forces to form the GIE "Blasons de Bourgogne". The aim is to achieve economies of scale.

In 1999, La Chablisienne bought Château Grenouilles, which produces Chablis Grand Cru from the Grenouilles climat in a virtual monopoly. In Burgundy, a climat is the wine-growing terroir, this word being used only in Burgundy. Carefully delimited for centuries (and remained almost unchanged since then), each climat is a parcel of vines that has its name, its history, its taste and its place in the hierarchy of the crus. There are more than 1000 climats in Burgundy.

== Vineyard ==
The partners manage 1,250 hectares (3,100 acres) of vines in production, including:

- 11.66 hectares (28.8 acres) of chablis grand cru (over six climats);
- 97.38 hectares (240.6 acres) of Premier Crus (over 18 climats);
- 766.27 hectares (1,893.5 acres) of Chablis;
- 266.45 hectares (658.4 acres) of Petit Chablis;
- 115.84 hectares (286.2 acres) of regional appellations.

== Products ==
Map of the Chablis vineyard.

The cooperative offers a little over thirty different vintages, not counting its eaux de vie (Marc de Bourgogne and fine de Bourgogne), including :

- Chablis grands crus from the climat of the Grenouilles (vines of 40 years old on average, matured for 20 months in vats and barrels) :
  - "Château Grenouilles";
  - "Le Fief de Grenouilles";
- Chablis grands crus from other climats (vines of 30 years old on average, aged for 20 months in vats and barrels):
  - "Les Clos";
  - "Blanchot;
  - "Bougros";
  - "Les Preuses";
- Chablis Premiers Crus (vines 25 years old on average, aged 12 to 15 months in vats and barrels):
  - "Montée de Tonnerre";
  - "la Singulière" (a blend of several climats);
  - "Mont de Milieu";
  - "Fourchaume;
  - "Les Lys";
  - "The Dead Man";
  - "Vaulorent";
  - "Montmains";
  - "Vaillons";
  - "Côte de Lechet";
  - "Beauroy";
  - "Chablis":
  - "les vénérables" (30 years old on average, aged for 14 months in vats and barrels);
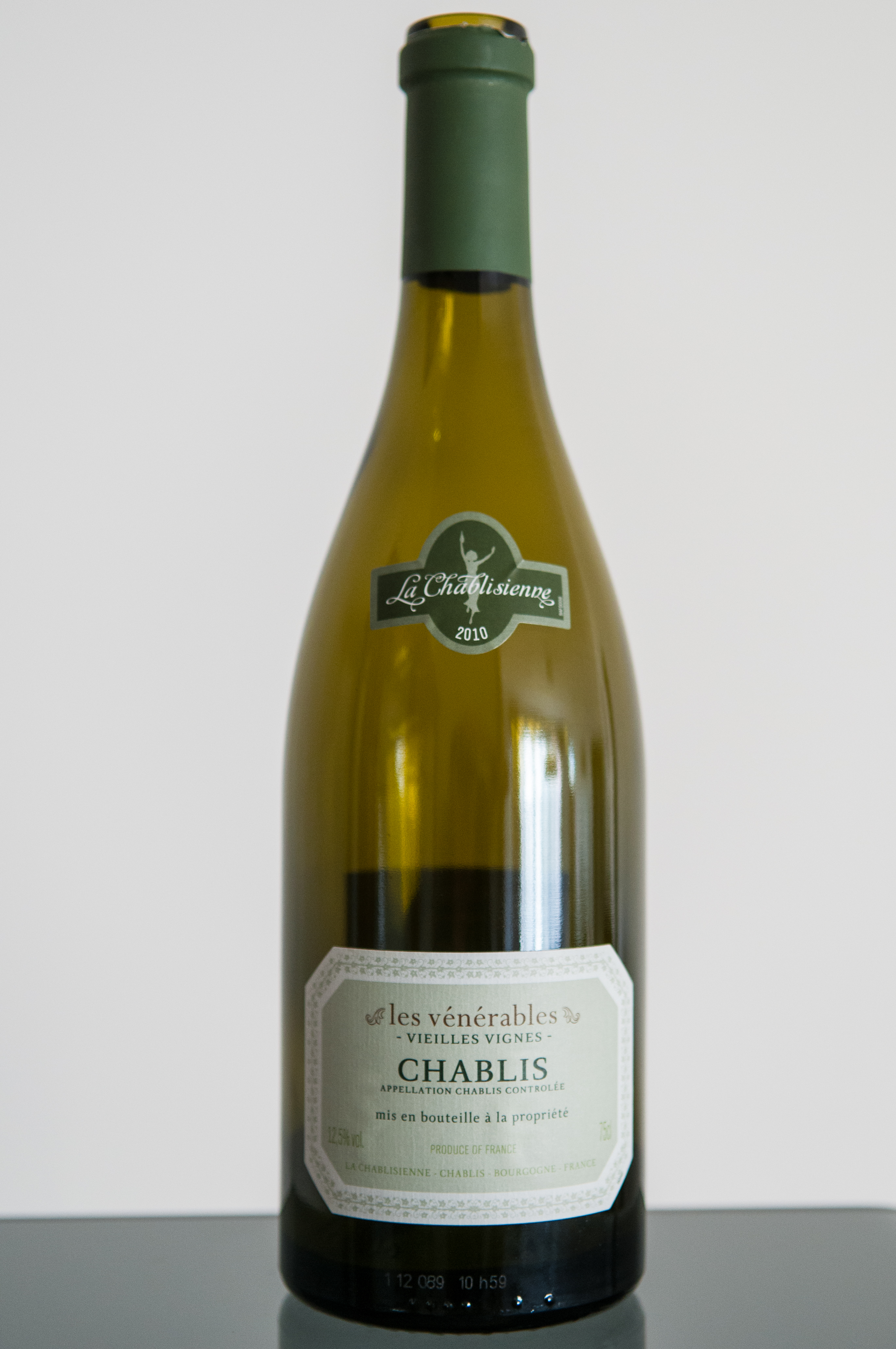
    Les vénérables, 2010.
  - "Nature" (climat "La Vallée de Chigot" in Fleys, organic, aged for 14 months in casks);
  - "la Sereine" (vines of 20 months on average, aged for 12 months in vats);
  - "la Pierrelée" (vines of 20 months on average, aged for 6 months in vats);
  - "le Finage" (vines of 20 months on average, aged in vats);
- Petit Chablis:
  - "pas-si-petit" (vines of 15 years old on average, aged for 6 months in vats).
- and other Burgundy appellations :
  - Saint-Bris;
  - Bourgogne Vézelay;
  - Bourgogne Aligoté;
  - White Burgundy;
  - Epineuil Rosé;
  - Irancy.
