= Chablis (AOC) =

French dry white wine

Coordinates: 47.8136°N 3.8002°E

- Wine region
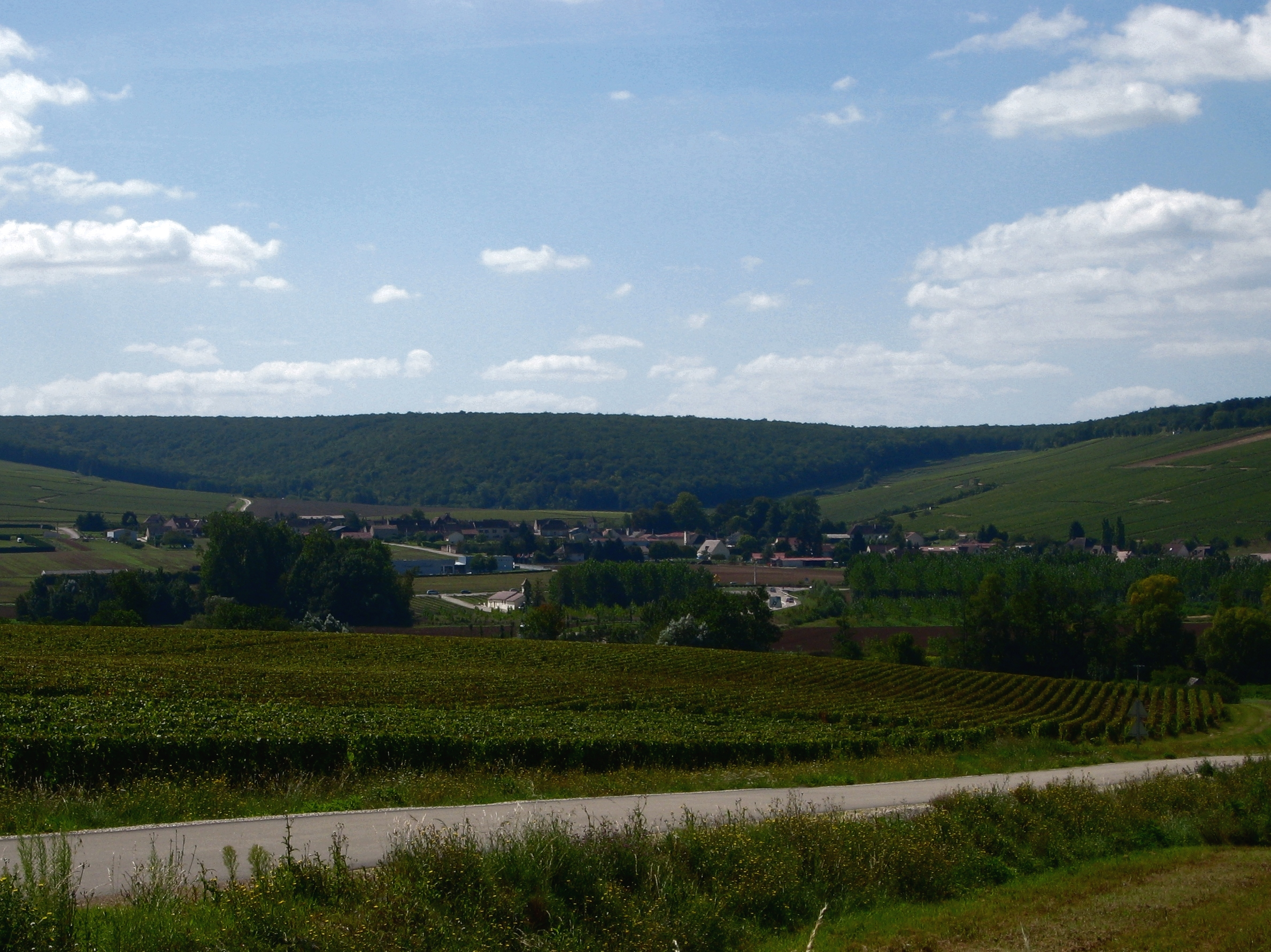
- View of Chablis, Burgundy, from the north, vineyard of Vaulorent in the foreground
- Type: Appellation d'origine contrôlée
- Year established: 1938
- Country: France
- Part of: Burgundy
- Total area: 6,834 ha (16,890 acres)
- Size of planted vineyards: 4,820 ha (11,900 acres)
- Varietals produced: Chardonnay (Beaunois)

Chablis (pronounced [ʃabli]) is the northernmost Appellation d'origine contrôlée of the Burgundy region in France. Its cool climate produces wines with more acidity and less fruitiness than warmer regions growing Chardonnay vines. These often have a "flinty" note, sometimes described as "goût de pierre à fusil" ("tasting of gunflint"), and sometimes as "steely". The Chablis AOC is required to use Chardonnay grapes solely.

The grapevines around the town of Chablis make a dry white wine. In comparison with the white wines from the rest of Burgundy, Chablis wine has typically much less influence of oak. The amount of barrel maturation, if any, is a stylistic choice that varies widely among Chablis producers. Many Grand Cru and Premier Cru wines receive some maturation in oak barrels, but typically the time in barrel and the proportion of new barrels is much smaller than for white wines of Côte de Beaune. Wines not vinified in barrel will instead be vinified in stainless steel.

== Location ==
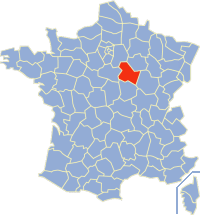
The Yonne department where Chablis is located

Chablis lies about sixteen kilometres (10 mi) east of Auxerre in the Yonne department, situated roughly halfway between the Côte d'Or and Paris. Of France's wine-growing areas, only Champagne, Lorraine, Alsace and parts of Grand Auxerrois have a more northerly location. Chablis is closer to the southern Aube district of Champagne than the rest of Burgundy.

The region encompasses 15 by 9 kilometres (9 1/2 mi × 5 1/2 mi) across 25 communes located along the Serein river. The soil is Kimmeridge Clay with outcrops of the same chalk layer that extends from Sancerre up to the White Cliffs of Dover, giving a name to the paleontologists' Cretaceous period. The Grands Crus, the best vineyards in the area, all lie on a single, small slope, facing southwest and located just north of the town of Chablis.

== History ==
During the Middle Ages the Catholic Church, particularly Cistercian monks, became a major influence in establishing the economic and commercial interest of viticulture for the region. Pontigny Abbey was founded in 1114, and the monks planted vines along the Serein. Anséric de Montréal gave a vineyard at Chablis to the Abbey in 1186. In 1245 the chronicler Salimbene di Adam described a Chablis wine. Chardonnay is believed to have first been planted in Chablis by the Cistercians of Pontigny Abbey in the 12th century, and from there spread south to the rest of the Burgundy region.

The Chablis area became part of the Duchy of Burgundy in the 15th century. There are records in the mid-15th century of Chablis wine being shipped to Flanders and Picardy. But in February 1568 the town was besieged by the Huguenots, who burned part of it.

The development of the French railway system opened up the Parisian market to wine regions across the country, dealing a significant blow to the monopoly held by the Chablis wine industry at the time.

The Seine river, easily accessible via the nearby Yonne river, gave the Chablis wine producers a near monopoly on the lucrative Parisian market. In the 17th century, the English discovered the wine and began importing large volumes. By the 19th century there were nearly 40,000 hectares (98,840 acres) of vines planted in Chablis with vineyards stretching from the town of Chablis to Joigny and Sens along the Yonne. Some Champagne producers used Chablis as a basis for a sparkling cuvée.

With the French Revolution, the monastic vineyards became biens nationaux, and were auctioned off. The new owners were mostly local, and the political upheaval saw small farmers involved as part-time vignerons. The English market continued to prosper. The 19th-century Russian novel Anna Karenina by Leo Tolstoy mentions "classic Chablis" as a commonplace choice of wine.

The end of the 19th century was a difficult time for the Chablis growers. Firstly, with new railway systems linking all parts of the country with Paris, there was inexpensive wine from regions in the Midi that undercut Chablis. The vineyards were affected by oidium from 1886, and then phylloxera from 1887. Effective replacement of vinestocks to counter phylloxera took some 15 years. Many Chablis producers gave up winemaking, the acreage in the region steadily declining throughout much of the early 20th century. By the 1950s there were only 500 hectares (1,235 acres) of vines planted in Chablis.

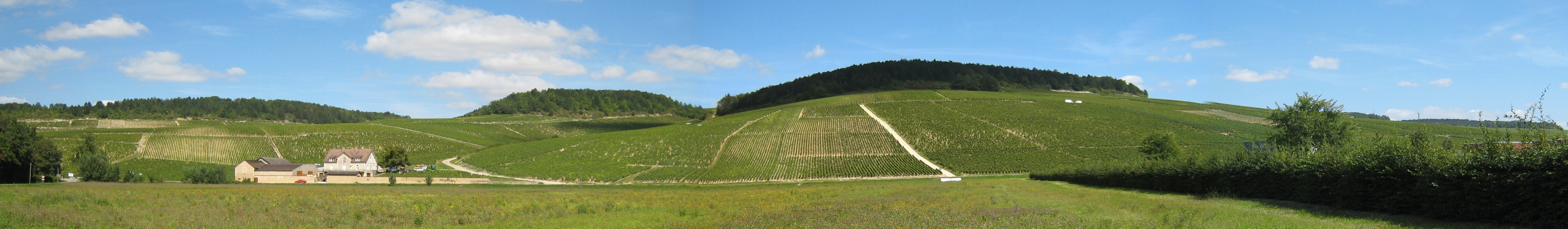
The Grand Cru vineyards of Chablis. From left to right: Les Preuses, Vaudésir, Grenouilles (around the house), Valmur, Les Clos, Blanchot, and in the far distance across the Vallée de Brechain, the Premier Cru of Montée de Tonnerre

The 20th century did bring about a renewed commitment to quality production and ushered in technological advances that would allow viticulture to be more profitable and reliable in this cool northern climate. In 1938, the Institut National des Appellations d'Origine created the Appellation d'origine contrôlée (AOC) region for Chablis that mandated the grape variety (Chardonnay) and acceptable winemaking and viticultural practices within delineated boundaries. One of the objectives of the AOC establishment was to protect the name "Chablis", which by this time was already being inappropriately used to refer to just about any white wine made from any number of white grape varieties all across the world. In the early 1960s, technological advances in vineyard frost protection minimized some of the risk and financial cost associated with variable vintages and climate of Chablis. The worldwide "Chardonnay-boom" of the mid-late 20th century opened up prosperous worldwide markets to Chablis and vineyard plantings saw a period of steady increase. By 2004, vineyard plantings in Chablis reached a little over 4,000 hectares (10,000 acres).

== Climate and geography ==
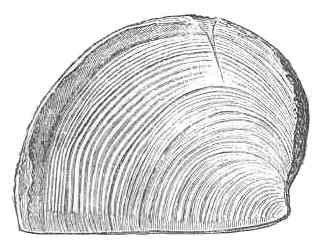
All of Chablis' Grand Cru vineyards and Premier Cru vineyards are planted on primarily Kimmeridgean soil which is composed of limestone, clay and fossilized oyster shells (pictured).

Located in northeast France, the Chablis region is considered the northernmost extension of the Burgundy wine region but it is separated from the Côte d'Or by the Morvan hills, with the main Burgundian winemaking town of Beaune located more than 100 km (62 mi) away. This makes the region of Chablis relatively isolated from other winemaking regions with the southern vineyards of the Champagne in the Aube department being the closest winemaking neighbor.

The Chablis wine region has much in common with Champagne province when it comes to climate. It has a semi-continental climate without maritime influence. The peak summer growing season can be hot; and wintertime can be long, cold and harsh, with frosty conditions lasting to early May. Years that experience too much rain and low temperature tend to produce wines excessively high in acidity and fruit that is too lean to support it. Vintages that are exceedingly warm tend to produce fat, flabby wines that are too low in acidity. Frost can be countered by heaters, and aspersion by sprinklers to form an ice layer. The exceptionally poor 1972 Chablis suffered frost at vintage time.

The region of Chablis lies on the eastern edge of the Paris Basin. The region's oldest soil dates back to the Upper Jurassic age, over 180 million years ago and includes a vineyard soil type that is calcareous, and known as Kimmeridge Clay. All of the Chablis Grand Cru and Premier Cru vineyards are planted on this primarily Kimmeridgean soil, which imparts a distinctively mineral, flinty note to the wines. Other areas, particularly most of the Petit Chablis vineyards, are planted on slightly younger Portlandian soil, still of similar structure. The chalk landscape resembles some areas of Champagne and Sancerre.

== Viticulture ==
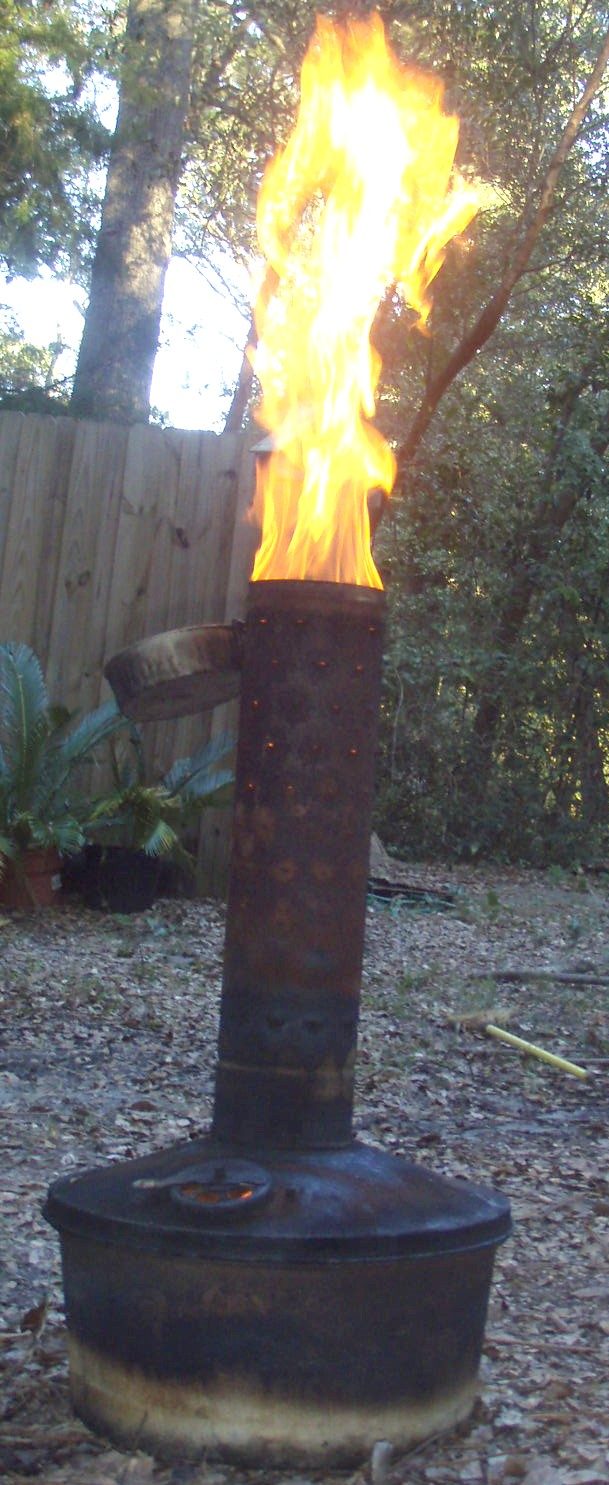
Smudge pots protect Chablis vineyards from frost.

A serious viticultural concern for Chablis vineyard owners is frost protection. During the bud break period of a grapevine's annual cycle, the Chablis region is vulnerable to springtime frost, from March to early May, which can compromise the crop yield. Formerly, the financial risk involved saw many producers turn to polyculture agriculture, pulling up vineyards to plant alternative crops. The 1957 vintage was hit particularly hard by frost damage: the regional authorities reported that only 11 cases (132 bottles) of wine were produced.

In the 1960s, technological advances in frost protection introduced preventive measures, such as smudge pots and aspersion irrigation to the region. Smudge pots work by providing direct heat to the vines while aspersion involves spraying the vines with water as soon as temperatures hit 0 °C (32 °F) and maintaining persistent coverage. The water freezes on the vine, shielding it with a protective layer of ice that functions igloo-style, retaining heat within the vine. While cost is a factor in using smudge pots, there is a risk with the aspersion method if the constant sprinkling of water is interrupted causing worse damage to the vine. There is no such protection against hail, which in 2016 caused serious difficulties for some Chablis vignerons.

At harvest time, AOC regulations stipulate grapes for Grand Cru vineyard must be picked with a potential alcohol level of at least 11 percent, at least 10.5 percent for Premiers Crus and 9.5 percent for AOC Chablis vineyards. Yields in Grands Crus must be limited to 45 hectoliters per hectare (3.3 tons per acre) with a 20% allowance for increased yields. There is no official regulation on the use of mechanical harvesting, but most Grand Cru producers prefer hand picking because human pickers tend to be more delicate with the grapes and can distinguish better between ripe and unripe bunches. Over the rest of the Chablis region, mechanical harvesting was used by around 80% of the vineyards at the turn of the 21st century. The traditional style of vine training in Chablis is to have the vine trained low to the ground for warmth with four cordons stretching out sideways from the trunk.

== Winemaking ==
The 20th century saw many advances in winemaking technology and practices—particularly the introduction of temperature-controlled fermentation and controlled inducing of malolactic fermentation. One winemaking issue that is still contested in the region is the use of oak. Historically Chablis was aged in old wooden feuillette barrels that were essentially neutral: they did not impart the characteristic oak flavors (vanilla, cinnamon, toast, coconut, etc.) that are today associated with ageing a wine in barrels. Hygiene was difficult to control with these older barrels, and they could develop faults in the wine, including discoloration. These old barrels fell out of favor, replaced by stainless steel fermentation tanks which also controlled temperatures.

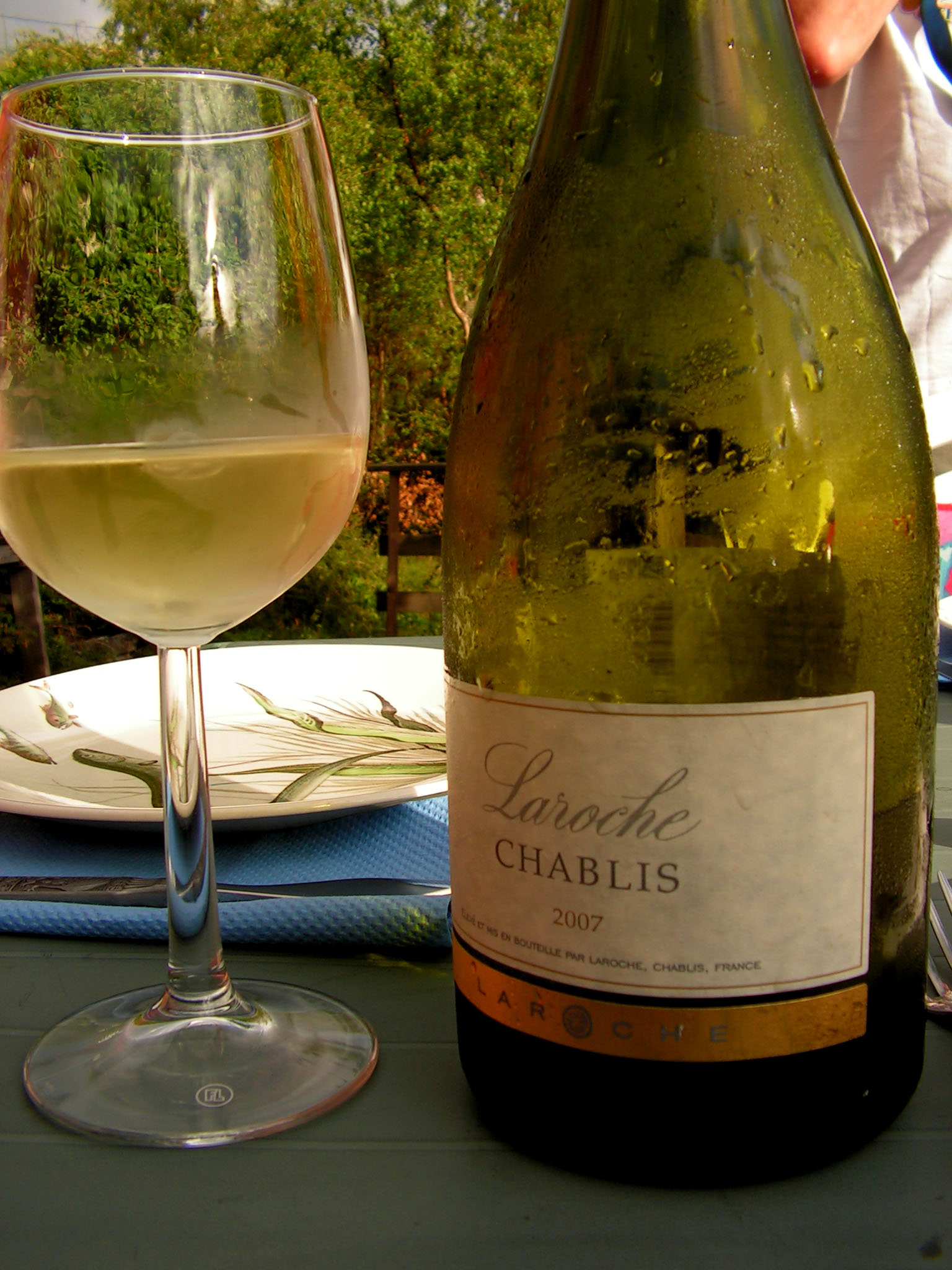
A glass and bottle of Chablis

The use of oak became controversial in the Chablis when some winemakers in the late 20th century went back to wooden barrels in winemaking, using oak barrels. So-called "traditionalist" winemakers dismissed the usage of oak as counter to the "Chablis style" or terroir, while "modernist" winemakers embrace its use though not to the extent of a "New World" Chardonnay. The amount of char in oak barrels used in Chablis is often low, which limits the "toastiness" that is perceived in the wine.

Rarely will a producer use oak for both fermentation and maturation. Grand Cru and Premier Cru wines are most likely to see oak: proponents believe that they have necessary structure and enough extract to avoid being overwhelmed by oak influence. While there are style differences among producers, rarely is basic AOC Chablis or Petit Chablis oaked.

While chaptalization was widely practiced for most of the 20th century, there has been a trend of riper vintages in recent years, producing grapes with higher sugar levels that have diminished the need to chaptalize.

== Appellation and classification ==
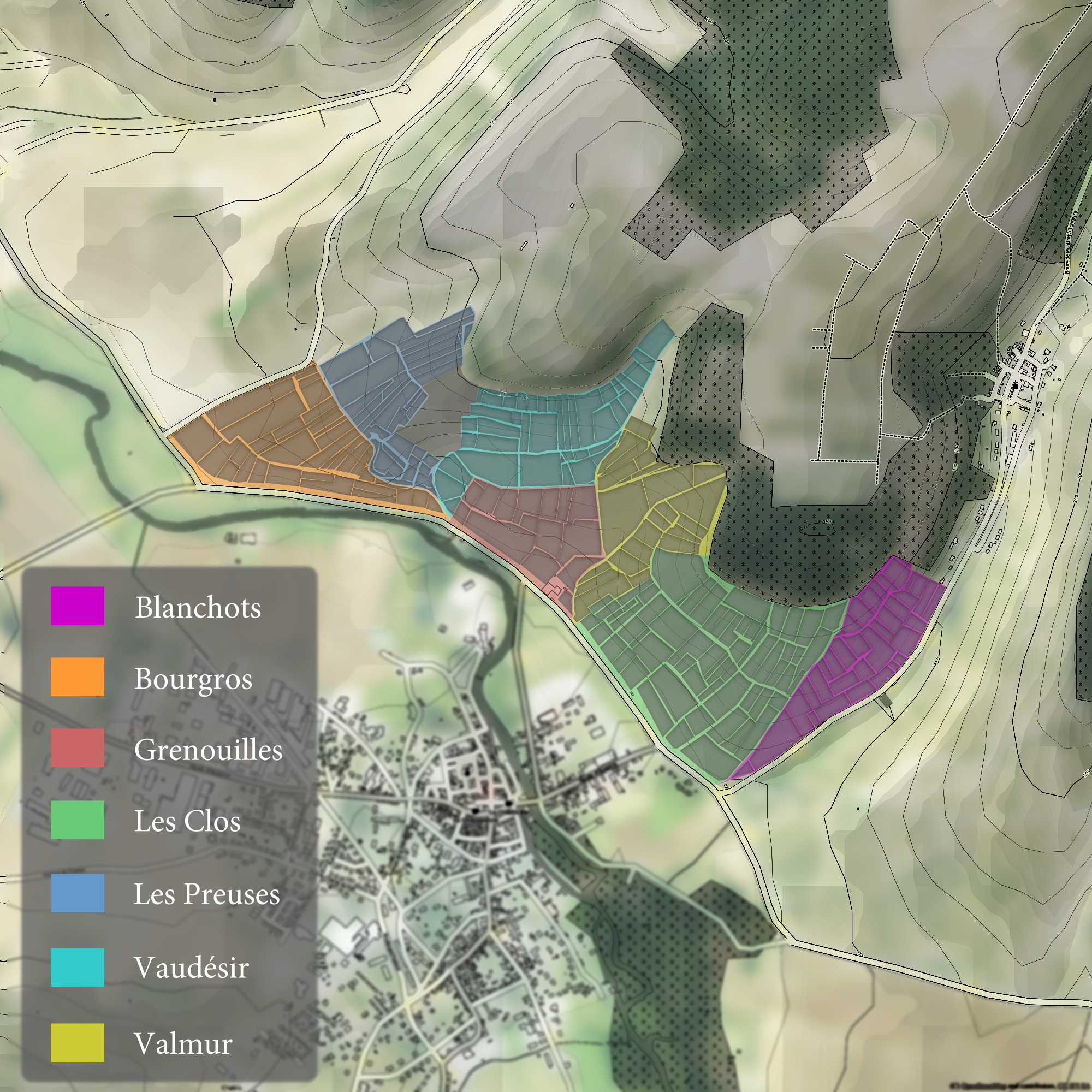
Map showing the location of the Grand Crus of Chablis

The main Chablis Appellation d'Origine Contrôlée was designated on January 13, 1938, but the junior appellation of Petit Chablis was not designated until January 5, 1944. All the vineyards in Chablis are covered by four appellations with different levels of classification, reflecting all-important differences in soil and slope in this northerly region. At the top of the classification are the seven Grand Cru vineyards, which are all located on a single hillside near the town of Chablis. Second in quality are the Premier Cru vineyards, which numbered 40 at the turn of the 21st century, covering an area of 750 hectares (1,853 acres). Next is the generic AOC Chablis which, at 2,860 hectares (7,067 acres), is the largest appellation by far in the region and the one exhibits the most variability between producers and vintages. At the lowest end of the classification is "Petit Chablis" which includes the outlying land. As of 2004, 560 hectares (1,380 acres) of a permitted 1,800 hectares (4,448 acres) in the Petit Chablis appellation were planted.

Soil and slope plays a major role in delineating the quality differences. Many of the Premier Crus, and all the Grand Crus vineyards, are planted along the valley of the Serein river as it flows into the Yonne. The Grand Crus and some of the most highly rated Premiers Crus (Mont de Milieu, Montée de Tonnerre, Fourchaume) are located on southwest facing slopes; these receive the maximum amount of sun exposure. The rest of the Premiers Crus are on southeast facing slopes.

=== Chablis Grands Crus ===
There are seven officially delineated Grand Cru climats, covering an area of 100 hectares (247 acres), all located on one southwest facing hill overlooking the town of Chablis at elevations between 150–200 metres (490–660 ft). One vineyard there, La Moutonne, between the Grand Cru vineyards of Les Preuses and Vaudésir, is often considered an "unofficial" Grand Cru. The Bureau Interprofessionnel des Vins de Bourgogne (BIVB) does recognize La Moutonne, but the seven Grand Cru vineyards officially recognized by the INAO are (from northwest to southeast): Bougros, Les Preuses, Vaudésir, Grenouilles, Valmur, Les Clos and Blanchot (also known as Les Blanchots). Together, the Grand Cru vineyards account for around 3% of Chablis annual yearly production.

While the producer can have a marked influence, each of the Grand Cru vineyards is noted for its particular terroir characteristic. Tom Stevenson notes that Blanchot produces the most delicate wine with floral aromas; Bougros is the least expressive but still has vibrant fruit flavors; Les Clos tends to produce the most complex wines with pronounced minerality; Grenouilles produces very aromatic wines with racy, elegance; the Les Preuses vineyard receives the most sun among the Grand Crus and tends to produce the most full bodied wines; Valmur is noted for its smooth texture and aromatic bouquet; Vaudésir tends to produce wines with intense flavors and spicy notes. Of all the Grand Cru vineyards, Les Clos is the largest in the area at 25 hectares (61 acres). Hugh Johnson describes the wines from this Grand Cru as having the best ageing potential among Chablis and developing Sauternes-like aromas after some bottle age.

The Union des Grands Crus de Chablis (UGCC) was launched in March 2000 as a syndicate restricted to Grand Cru proprietors, with mission "to defend and promote the quality of Chablis Grand Cru wines". Members are bound to abide by a charter that covers wine making and sales. Grand Cru makers must submit their wines to a tasting committee of other Union members to ensure they meet the required quality. These tastings are conducted blind.

=== Premiers Crus ===
At the turn of the 21st century, there were 40 Premier Cru vineyards. The names of many of these vineyards do not appear on wine labels. The INAO permits the use of "umbrella names": smaller, lesser known vineyards are allowed to use the name of a nearby more famous Premier Cru vineyard. Some of the "umbrella" vineyards are Mont de Milieu, Montée de Tonnerre, Fourchaume, Vaillons, Montmains, Beauroy, Vaudevey, Vaucoupin, Vosgros, Les Fourneaux, Côte de Jouan and Les Beauregards. In general, Premier Cru wines have at least half a degree less alcohol by volume and tend to have less aromatics and intensity in flavors.

== Grapes and wine ==
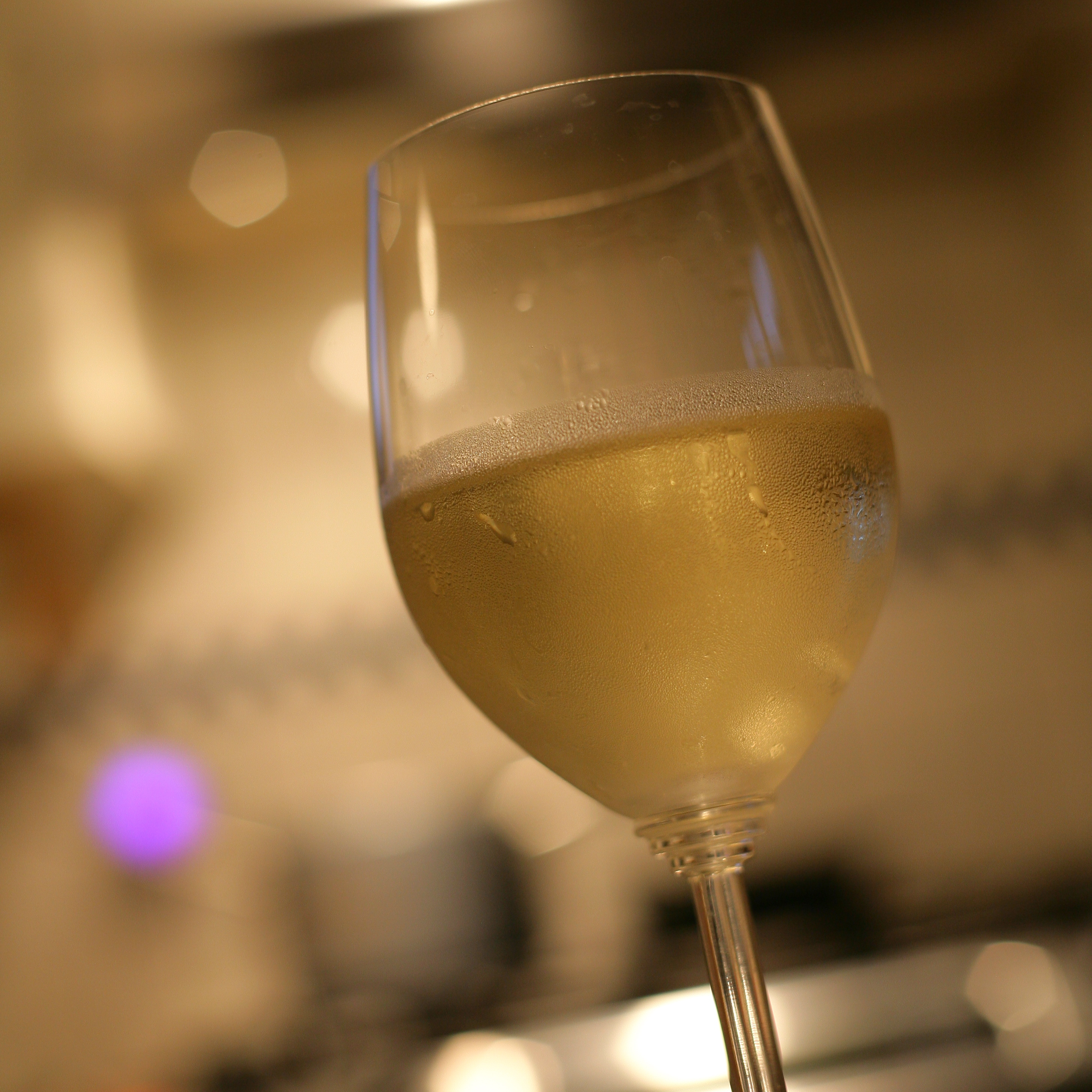
Chablis is characterized by its pale yellow color with greenish tint.

All Chablis is made 100% from the Chardonnay grape. Some wine experts, such as Jancis Robinson, believe that the wine from Chablis is one of the "purest" expressions of the varietal character of Chardonnay, because of the simple style of winemaking favored in this region. Chablis winemakers want to emphasize the terroir of the calcareous soil and cooler climate that help maintain high acidity. Chablis wines are characterized by their greenish-yellow color and clarity. The racy, green apple-like acidity is a trademark of the wines and can be noticeable in the bouquet. The acidity can mellow with age and Chablis are some of the longest living examples of Chardonnay. The wines often have a "flinty" note, sometimes described as "goût de pierre à fusil" (gunflint) and sometimes as "steely". Some examples of Chablis can have an earthy "wet stone" flavor that intensifies as it ages, before mellowing into delicate honeyed notes. Like most white Burgundies, Chablis can benefit from some bottle age. While producers' styles and vintage can play an influential role, Grand Cru Chablis can generally age for well over 15 years while many Premiers Crus will age well for at least 10 years.

Secondary grape varieties grown locally are permitted in the generic Bourgogne AOC wine. These include Aligoté, César, Gamay, Melon de Bourgogne, Pinot noir, Pinot blanc, Pinot gris (known locally as Pinot Beurot), Sauvignon blanc, Sacy, and Tressot.

== Modern wine industry ==
For most of the 20th century, Chablis wine was produced more for the export than the domestic French market, which tended to favor the Côte d'Or Chardonnays. Négociants are not as influential in the Chablis wine industry as in other areas of Burgundy. Trends towards estate bottling and co-operatives have shifted the economics towards the individual growers and producer. The La Chablisienne co-operative makes nearly a third of all wine produced in Chablis today.

In recent years, Chablis producers have fought hard to protect the Chablis designation, using legal means to make foreign countries respect it. Despite a long association with Chardonnay, the wines of Chablis can be overshadowed by the New World expression of the varietal, and by other Burgundian Chardonnays such as Montrachet, Corton-Charlemagne and Meursault. The wide semi-generic use of the word "Chablis" outside of France is still seen in describing almost any white wine, regardless of where it was made and from what grapes.

== See also ==
- List of Burgundy Grand Crus
- List of Chablis crus
