= List of Chablis crus =

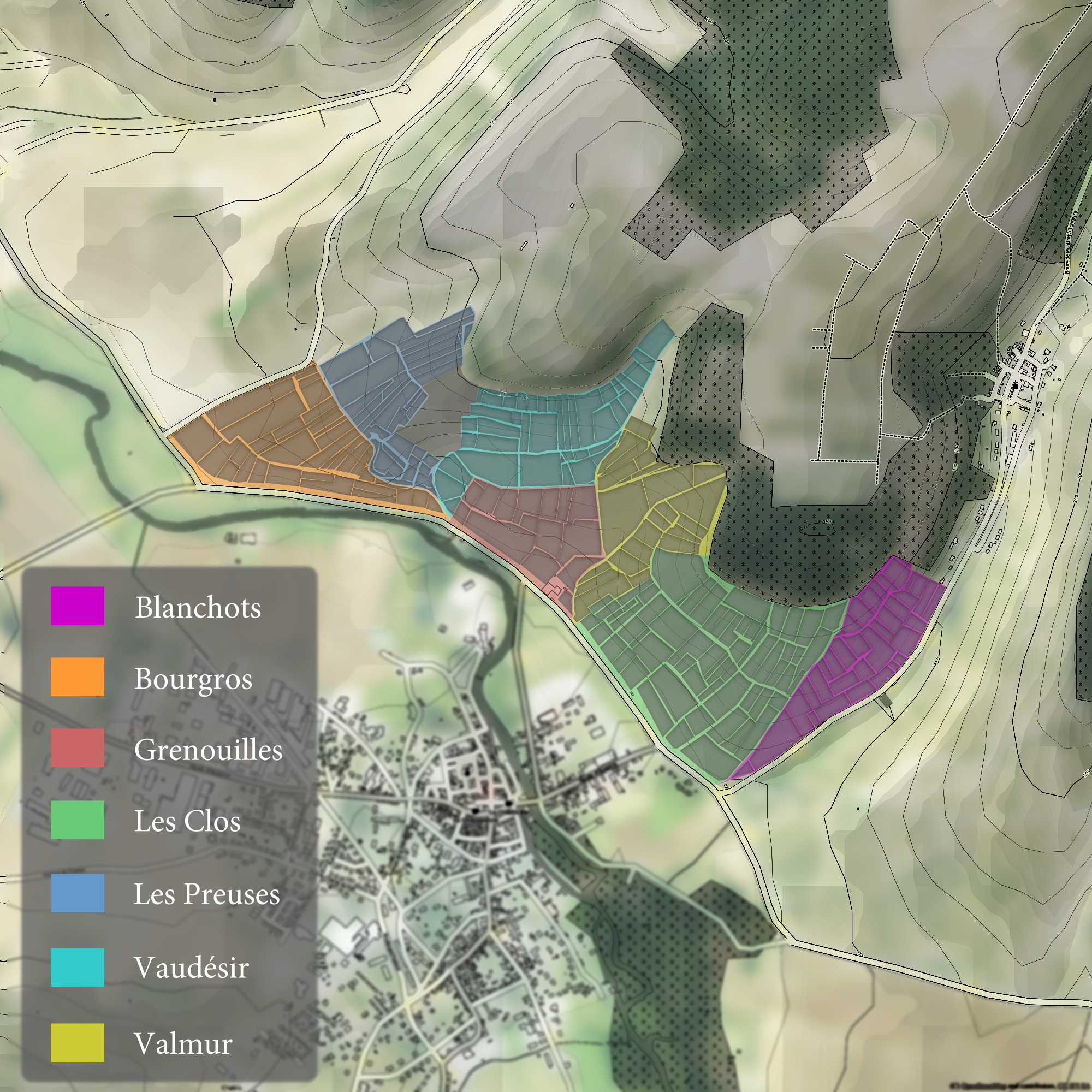
Map showing the location of the Grand Crus of Chablis.

The Chablis region of Burgundy is classified according to four tiers of Appellation d'origine contrôlée (AOC) designation. The top two are the crus of Chablis and include the 7 Grand cru vineyards followed by the lower Premier crus. Wines made entirely from fruit from these vineyards are entitled to list their wines as cru classé Chablis on the wine label. Below these tiers are the lower designations of basic Chablis AOC and Petit Chablis. Soil quality and hill slope play a major role in delineating the differences. Many of the Premier Crus, and all the Grand Crus vineyards, are planted along valley of the Serein river as it flows into the Yonne with the best sites located on a southwest facing slope that receives the maximum amount of sun exposure. All of Chablis' Grand Cru vineyards and many of their better Premier Cru vineyards are planted on primarily Kimmeridgean soil (a composition of limestone, clay and tiny fossilized oyster shells) which is believed to impart more finesse and structure to the wines. Other areas, particularly the vast majority of Petit Chablis vineyards, are planted on slightly younger Portlandian soil.

== Grand Cru vineyards ==
There is one Grand Cru in Chablis with seven officially delineated Grand Cru climats, covering an area of 247 acres (100 hectares), all located on one southwest facing hill overlooking the town of Chablis. There is one vineyard, La Moutonne, located on this hill between the Grand Cru vineyards of Les Preuses and Vaudésir that is considered an "unofficial" Grand Cru and it will appear on wine labels. However, the Institut National des Appellations d'Origine (INAO) does not recognize La Moutonne as a Grand Cru.

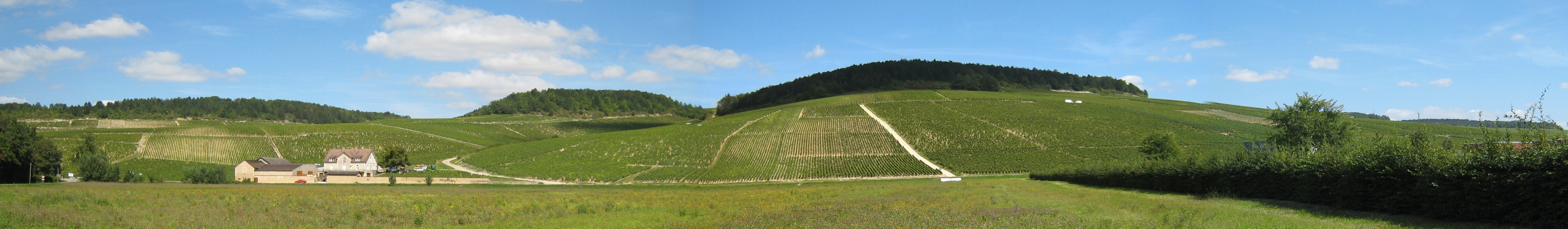
The Grand Cru vineyards of Chablis. From left to right — Les Preuses, Vaudésir, Grenouilles (around the house), Valmur, Les Clos, Blanchots and in the far distance across the Vallée de Brechain, the Premier Cru of Montée de Tonnerre.

- Les Preuses
- Vaudésir
- Grenouilles
- Valmur
- Les Clos
- Blanchot
- Bougros
- (unofficial) La Moutonne

== Premier Crus ==
At the turn of the 21st century, there were 40 Premier cru vineyards in Chablis. In 2009, the official list was expanded to 89 vineyards. The names of many of these vineyards do not appear on wine labels because of an INAO allowance that permits the use of "umbrella names" - where smaller, lesser known vineyards are allowed to use the name of a nearby more famous Premier cru vineyard. Seventeen of the most well known "umbrella" vineyards are bolded below.

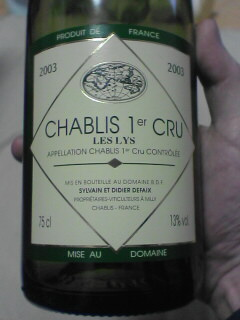
A bottle of Premier Cru Chablis from the Les Lys vineyards

- **Mont de Milieu** - Vallée de Chigot
- **Montée de Tonnerre** - Chapelot, Les Chapelots, Pied d’Aloup, Sous Pied d’Aloup, Côte de Bréchain
- **Fourchaume** - Vaupulent, Vau Pulan, Les Vaupulans, La Fourchaume, Côte de Fontenay, Dine-Chien, L’Homme Mort, La Grande Côte, Bois Seguin, L’Ardillier, Vaulorent, Les Quatre Chemins, La Ferme Couverte, Les Couvertes
- **Vaillons** - Sur les Vaillons, Chatains, Les Grands Chaumes, Les Chatains, Sécher, Beugnons, Les Beugnons, Les Lys, Champlain, Mélinots, Les Minos, Roncières, Les Epinottes
- **Montmains** - Les Monts Mains, Forêts, Les Forêts, Butteaux, Les Bouts des Butteaux, Vaux Miolot, Le Milieu des Butteaux, Les Ecueillis, Vaugerlains
- **Côte de Léchet** - Le Château
- **Beauroy** - Sous Boroy, Vallée des Vaux, Benfer, Troësmes, Côte de Troësmes, Adroit de Vau Renard, Côte de Savant, Le Cotat-Château, Frouquelin, Le Verger
- **Vauligneau** - Vau de Longue, Vau Girault, La Forêt, Sur la Forêt
- **Vaudevey** - La Grande Chaume, Vaux Ragons, Vignes des Vaux Ragons
- **Vaucoupin** - Adroit de Vaucopins
- **Vosgros** - Adroit de Vosgros, Vaugiraut
- **Les Fourneaux** - Morein, Côte des Près Girots, La Côte, Sur la Côte
- **Côte de Vaubarousse**
- **Berdiot**
- **Chaume de Talvat**
- **Côte de Jouan**
- **Les Beauregards** - Hauts des Chambres du Roi, Côte de Cuissy, Les Corvées, Bec d'Oiseau, Vallée de Cuissy

== See also ==
- Burgundy wine
- List of Burgundy Grand Crus
