= Irancy =

- Commune
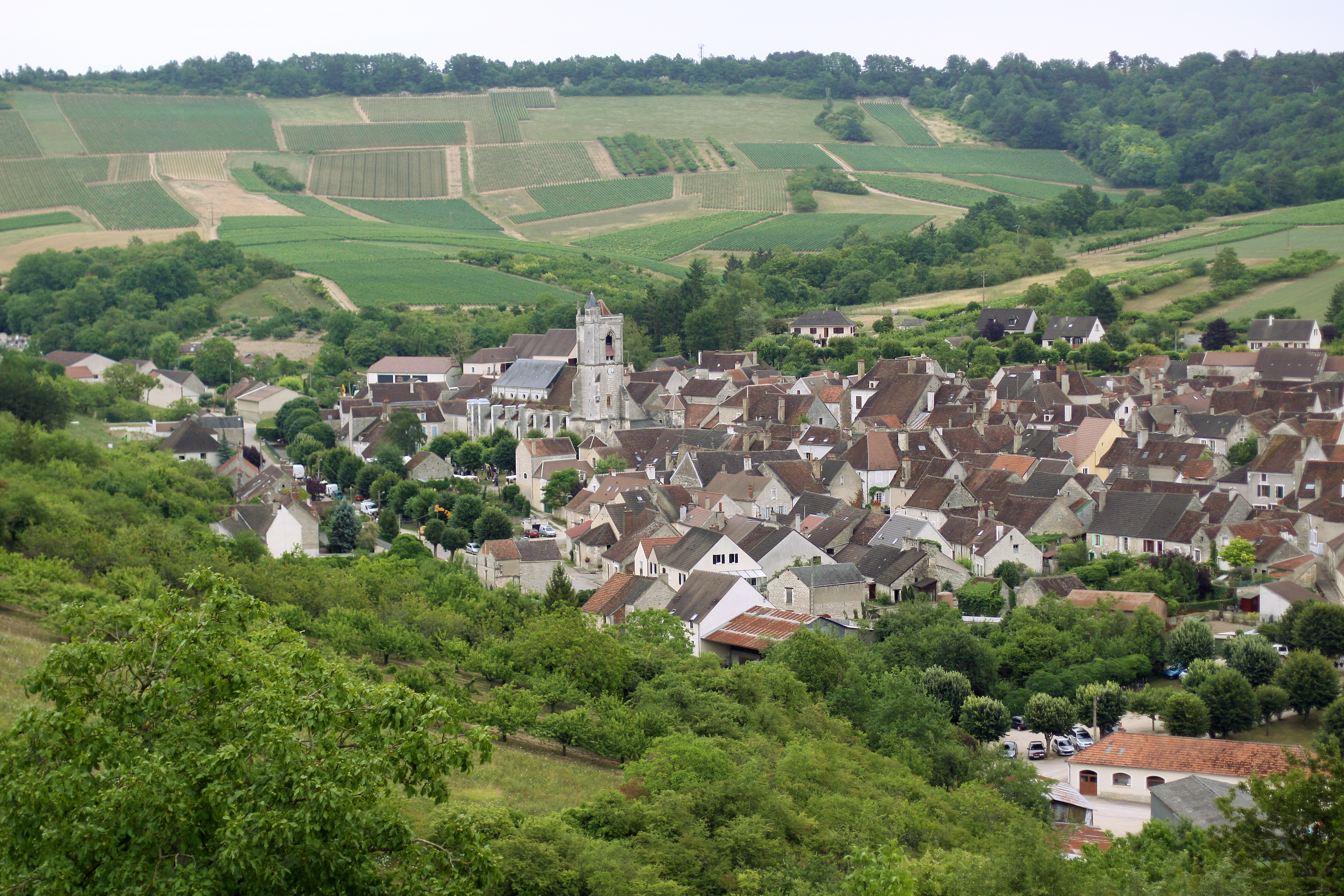
- A general view of Irancy
- Location of Irancy
- Location within France Location within Bourgogne-Franche-Comté
- Coordinates: 47°42′51″N 3°39′56″E
- Country: France
- Region: Bourgogne-Franche-Comté
- Department: Yonne
- Arrondissement: Auxerre
- Canton: Vincelles
- Intercommunality: CA Auxerrois

Government
  - Mayor (2020–2026): Stephan Podor
- Area^{1}: 11.98 km^{2} (4.63 sq mi)
- Highest elevation: 298 m (978 ft)
- Lowest elevation: 105 m (344 ft)
- Population (2023): 247
  - Density: 20.6/km^{2} (53.4/sq mi)
- Time zone: UTC+01:00 (CET)
  - Summer (DST): UTC+02:00 (CEST)
- INSEE/Postal code: 89202 /89290
- ^{1} French Land Register data, which excludes lakes, ponds, glaciers > 1 km^{2} (0.386 sq mi or 247 acres) and river estuaries.

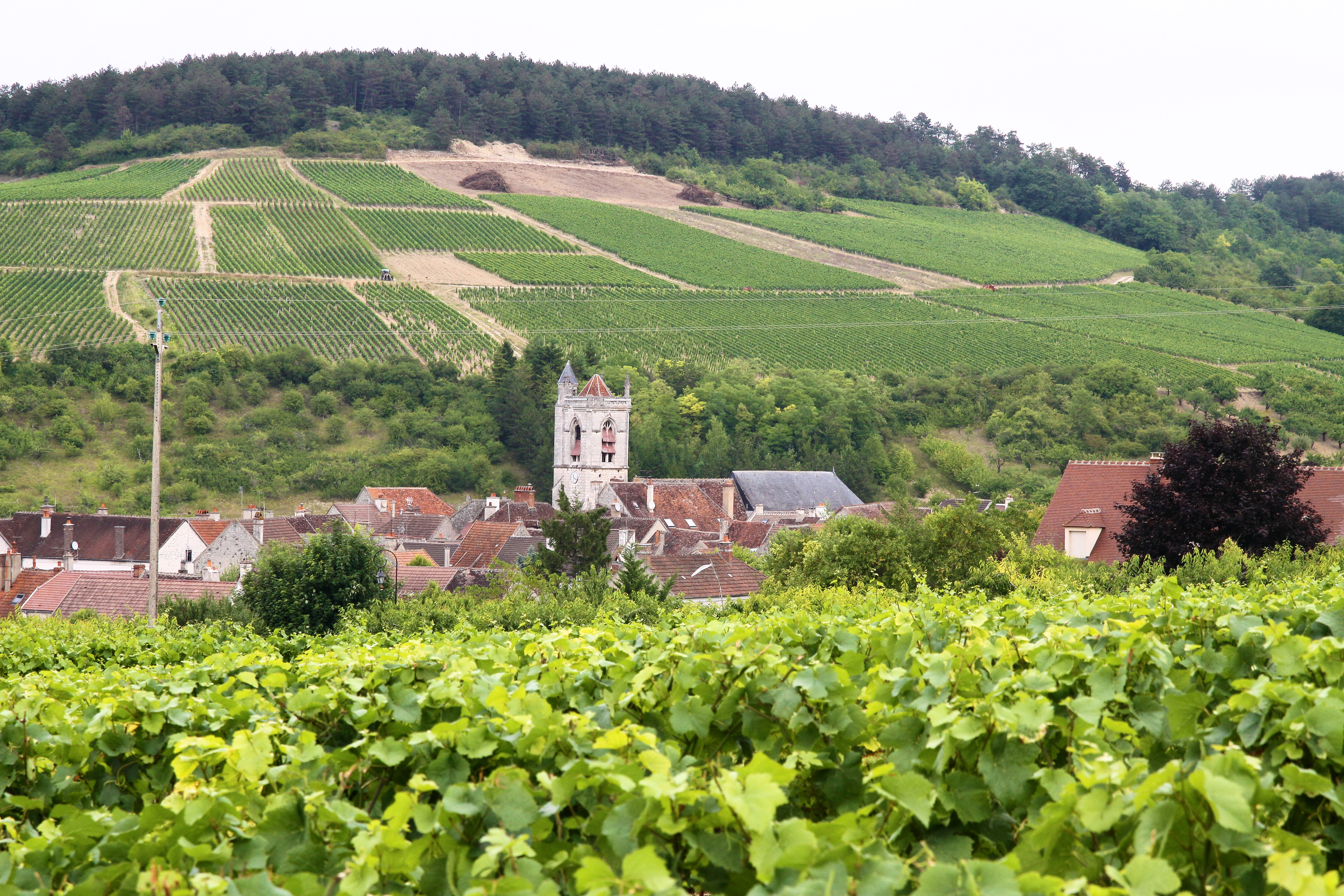
Irancy, view from the south side

Irancy (French pronunciation: [iʁɑ̃si]) is a commune in the Yonne department in Bourgogne-Franche-Comté in north-central France. It is located southwest of Chablis in Bourgogne-Franche-Comté.

== History ==
The town of Irancy was developed beginning in the year 900AD when the Abbot Richard, Duke of Burgundy, expanded his abbey to include the region of Irancy. This action was granted by the charter of King Charles on 22 April of the same year.

=== Huguenots ===
The religious tension of France during the Middle Ages reached even to the small town of Irancy. The city had been built around the Catholic convent of Saint Germain and persecutions for Protestants led to a siege in 1568. On 7 February, a group of French Protestants called Huguenots laid siege to the town of Irancy, an incident now called the Siege of Cravant. The village was looted and many people were killed, their bodies piled in an empty well. Still to this day, one of the streets in Irancy is called the "street of the dead" due to this incident.

=== Cholera pandemic ===
Up to 1832, the deaths in Irancy were approximately 30 people per year. However, Cholera swept the town twice between 1826 and 1841. During the height of the pandemic, Irancy lost 97 people in one month alone. Many families lost more than one person, a mother, a father, child or sibling.

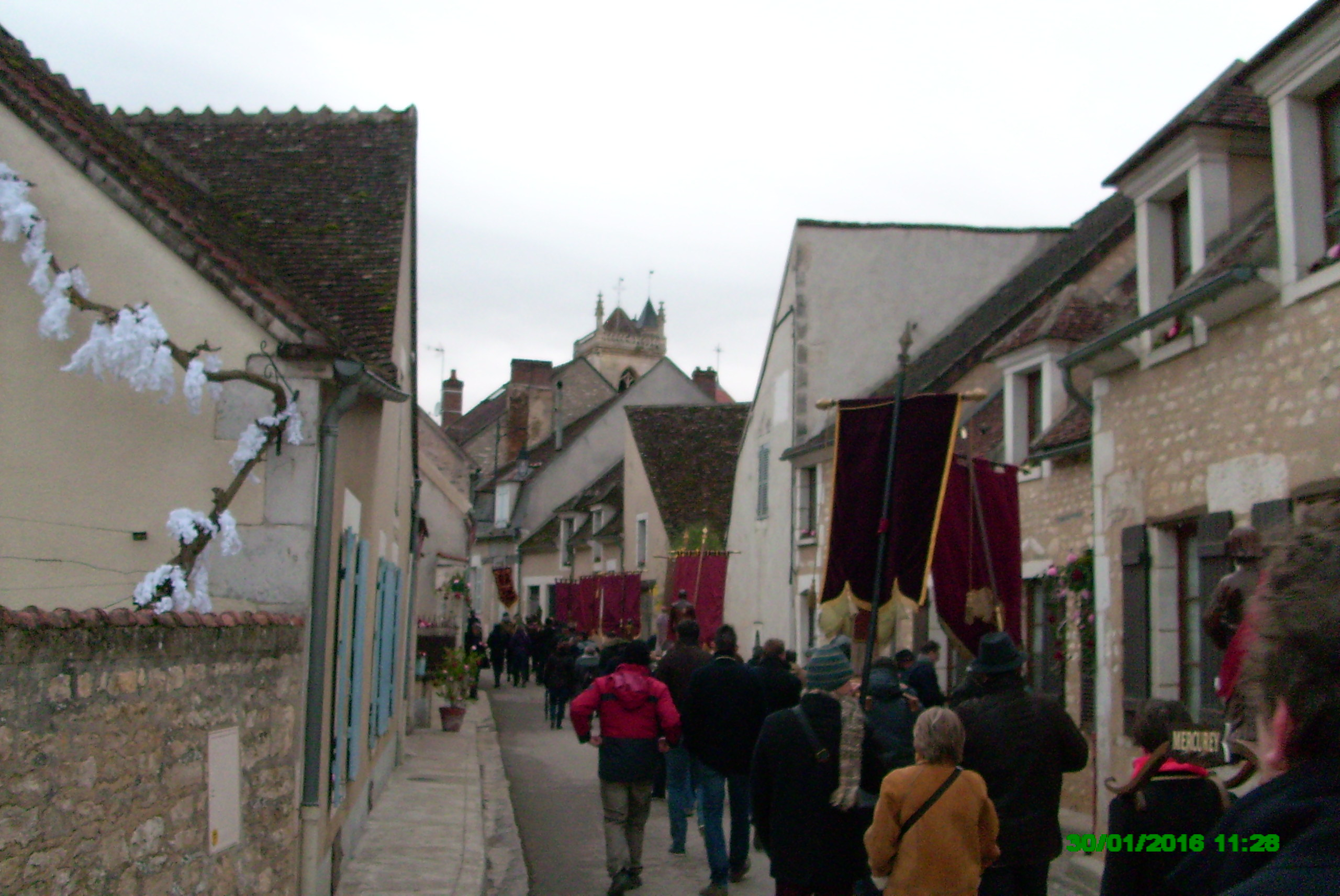
Saint-Vincent Tournante à Irancy en 2016

== Irancy wines ==
Despite once possessing a considerable reputation, the wines of Irancy had long since lost out to their more famous cousins in the Côte-d'Or. However, from the 1980s a number of producers have worked to change this situation and in 1999 they were rewarded with an area specific AOC. The area primarily produces red wines, predominantly from the Pinot noir grape, although a small amount of rosé is also produced. Some producers also include small quantities of César and Tressot, less-known Burgundy grape varieties.

Irancy's unusual topography - it lies in the hollow of a valley whose slopes are covered with vines and cherry trees - shelters it from some of the worst of the winter weather, whilst also allowing for sufficient sun to ripen the grapes. The area is one of the most northerly for red wine grape growing.

In most years Irancy wines can be consumed within three or four years of bottling, however, many vintages will continue to improve for many years beyond that.

== Notable people ==
- Jacques-Germain Soufflot - Neoclassicist architect who built the Panthéon and the Hôtel-Dieu de Lyon

== See also ==
- Communes of the Yonne department
- List of Appellation d'Origine Contrôlée wines
