= Noyers, Yonne =

Noyers
- Commune
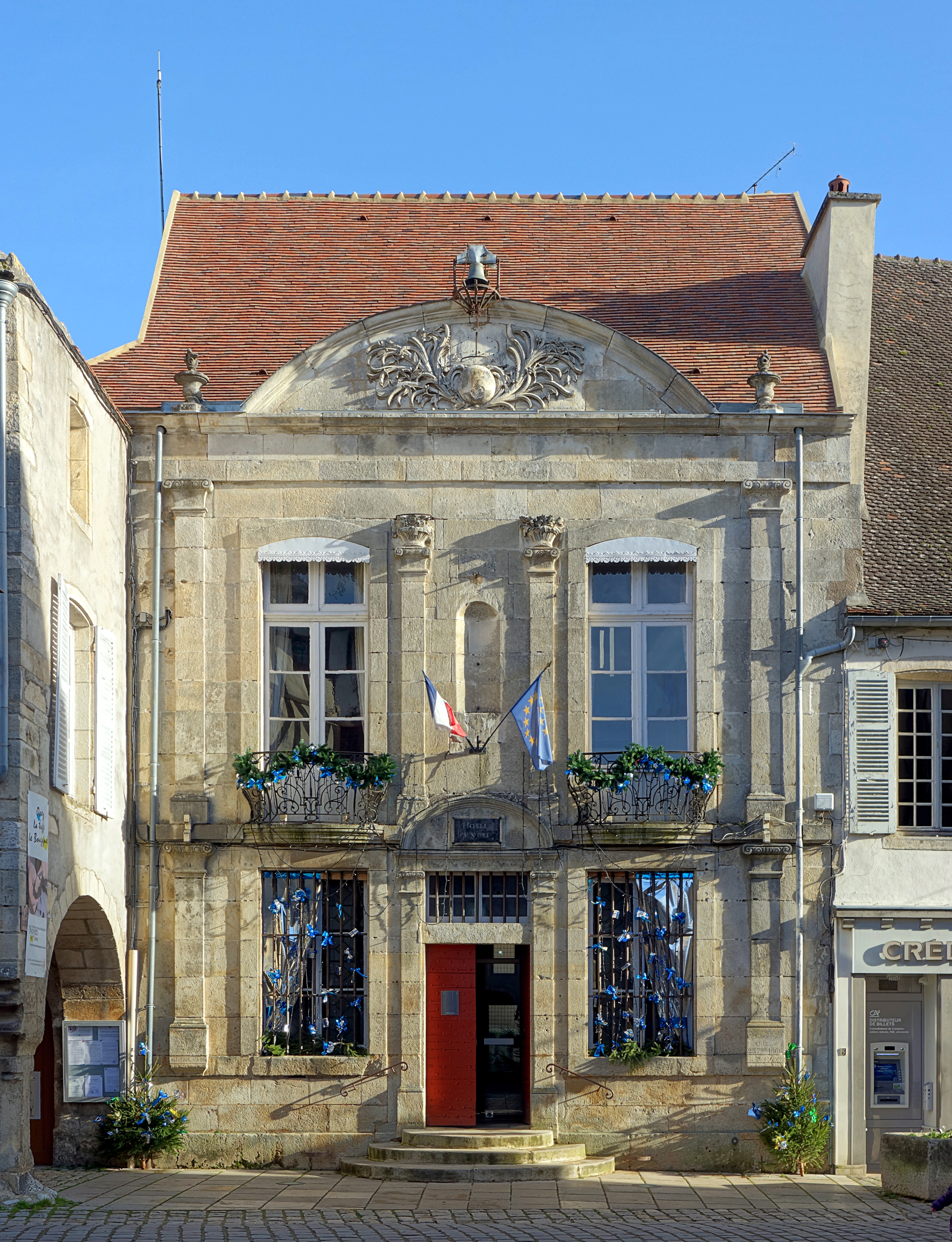
- The town hall in Noyers

- Coat of arms
- Location of Noyers
- Location within France Location within Bourgogne-Franche-Comté
- Coordinates: 47°41′51″N 3°59′41″E
- Country: France
- Region: Bourgogne-Franche-Comté
- Department: Yonne
- Arrondissement: Avallon
- Canton: Chablis

Government
  - Mayor (2020–2026): Nathalie Labosse
- Area^{1}: 35.66 km^{2} (13.77 sq mi)
- Elevation: 189 m (620 ft)
- Highest elevation: 296 m (971 ft)
- Lowest elevation: 167 m (548 ft)
- Population (2023): 587
  - Density: 16.5/km^{2} (42.6/sq mi)
- Time zone: UTC+01:00 (CET)
  - Summer (DST): UTC+02:00 (CEST)
- INSEE/Postal code: 89279 /89310
- ^{1} French Land Register data, which excludes lakes, ponds, glaciers > 1 km^{2} (0.386 sq mi or 247 acres) and river estuaries.

Noyers (French pronunciation: [nwajɛʁ]; often referred to as Noyers-sur-Serein) is a commune in the Yonne department in Bourgogne-Franche-Comté in north-central France. It is a member of Les Plus Beaux Villages de France (The Most Beautiful Villages of France) Association.

There are half-timbered houses, ashlars, pillars and pinnacles. There are many cobbled lanes and small squares made of chalky and granitic pavements. There are towers surrounded by the river Serein loops. It has retained much of its medieval appearance with many buildings dating from the 16th century, and is a tourist destination with several restaurants, art galleries, a pottery and a museum. The centre is pedestrianised on Saturdays and Sundays in summer. The village also holds two large truffle fairs in November where locally picked fresh truffles are sold to buyers from throughout France and beyond.

== History ==
The origins of Noyers are unclear. It was founded by the king of Sequani Gaul tribe, just before the Roman conquest, or by a contemporary of Julius Caesar called Lucidorius. He would have given the city its first name, Lucida.

Around and after the 12th century the city became the seat of the Miles family. At the end of the twelfth century, Hugues de Noyers, bishop of Auxerre, built "one of the most famous castles of France". It was beleaguered by Blanche of Navarre's troops in 1217, but it did resist.

In 1419, at the end of the Miles dynasty, Noyers became the property of the dukes of Burgundy. The prince of Condé became count of Noyers. He made a Huguenot place of the city and took refuge in it after the defeat of the Amboise conspiracy in 1568. But Catherine de Médicis dislodged him and the garrison surrendered.

Later the castle was dismantled by King Henry IV in 1599. After a long time of lethargy the city revived in 1710 when the duke of Luynes married the granddaughter of Louis, Count of Soissons and co-heiress of the Princes of Neuchâtel of the House of Orléans-Longueville.

Wine and grain trade were prosperous at Noyers. Many documents attest there were plenty of vines, walnut-trees and cherry-trees over the hills all around Noyers. Till the beginning of the twentieth century a great part of local craftsmen was represented by cartwrights, harness-makers, coopers, farriers and shoe makers. In 1861 there were 128 vine-growers and 25 tillage-farmers. As of the 21st century, they are not as many farmers.

On December 7, 1983, Duran Duran filmed the music video for their single New Moon On Monday within the city walls after dark. The town's historic streets have also been featured in several other films and TV series.

== Twin towns ==
- Noceto, Italy

== Climate ==
Climate data for Noyers (2010–2020 normals, extremes 2010-present)
Month	Jan	Feb	Mar	Apr	May	Jun	Jul	Aug	Sep	Oct	Nov	Dec	Year
Record high °C (°F)	16.5 (61.7)	22.8 (73.0)	25.4 (77.7)	28.0 (82.4)	33.9 (93.0)	41.2 (106.2)	40.7 (105.3)	39.9 (103.8)	35.3 (95.5)	30.0 (86.0)	23.5 (74.3)	18.3 (64.9)	41.2 (106.2)
Mean daily maximum °C (°F)	6.5 (43.7)	7.8 (46.0)	12.6 (54.7)	16.8 (62.2)	19.3 (66.7)	24.1 (75.4)	26.8 (80.2)	26.3 (79.3)	22.2 (72.0)	16.5 (61.7)	10.9 (51.6)	7.7 (45.9)	16.5 (61.7)
Daily mean °C (°F)	4.0 (39.2)	4.4 (39.9)	7.9 (46.2)	11.3 (52.3)	14.0 (57.2)	18.3 (64.9)	20.8 (69.4)	20.4 (68.7)	16.7 (62.1)	12.5 (54.5)	7.9 (46.2)	5.0 (41.0)	11.9 (53.4)
Mean daily minimum °C (°F)	1.5 (34.7)	1.0 (33.8)	3.2 (37.8)	5.9 (42.6)	8.6 (47.5)	12.5 (54.5)	14.7 (58.5)	14.5 (58.1)	11.2 (52.2)	8.5 (47.3)	4.9 (40.8)	2.3 (36.1)	7.4 (45.3)
Record low °C (°F)	−9.6 (14.7)	−13.4 (7.9)	−5.0 (23.0)	−4.9 (23.2)	0.0 (32.0)	4.5 (40.1)	7.8 (46.0)	7.3 (45.1)	2.4 (36.3)	−3.4 (25.9)	−8.0 (17.6)	−11.3 (11.7)	−13.4 (7.9)
Average precipitation mm (inches)	68.2 (2.69)	55.0 (2.17)	52.0 (2.05)	62.4 (2.46)	82.7 (3.26)	75.5 (2.97)	47.0 (1.85)	59.5 (2.34)	50.1 (1.97)	83.8 (3.30)	70.0 (2.76)	79.7 (3.14)	785.9 (30.94)
Average precipitation days (≥ 1.0 mm)	12.7	11.0	10.0	9.2	11.6	9.4	7.7	7.7	7.8	10.3	11.6	13.6	122.5
Source: Meteociel

== See also ==
- Communes of the Yonne department
