= César (grape) =

Variety of grape

- Grape (Vitis)
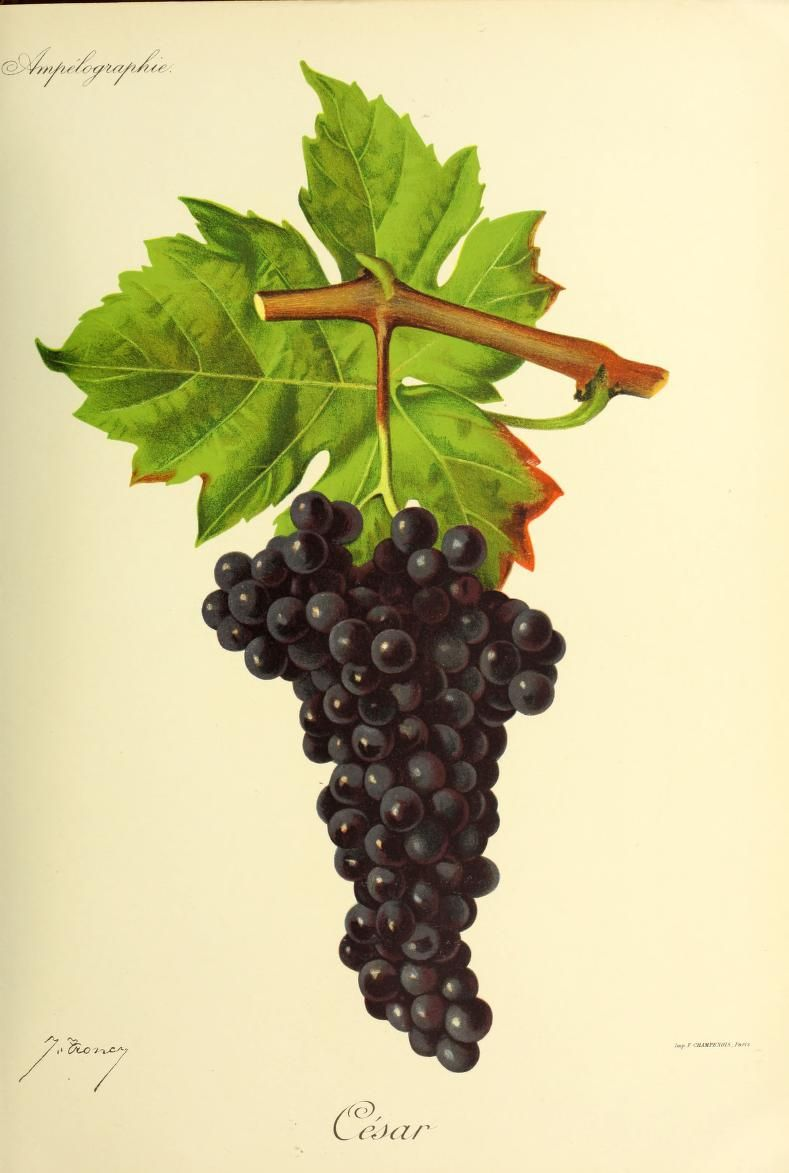
- Species: Vitis vinifera
- Also called: Romain, Picorneau (more)
- Origin: France
- Notable regions: northern Burgundy
- Notable wines: Bourgogne-Irancy
- VIVC number: 2400

César is an ancient red wine grape from northern Burgundy. It makes dark, tannic wines that are softened by blending with Pinot noir.

== History ==
The name and the alternative of Romain refer to the tradition that César was brought to Burgundy by Roman legionaries.

However DNA fingerprinting has shown that it is the result of a cross between Pinot noir and Argant. Argant is a Spanish grape that was certainly grown in the Jura in the 19th century.

== Distribution and Wines ==
Almost all César is found northwest of Dijon towards Chablis in the département of Yonne. It is best known in the red wines of Irancy, but may also be blended into rosé, clairet and Bourgogne mousseux.

== Vine and Viticulture ==
César is an early budding variety, which makes it very vulnerable to frost in Burgundy. It is also fairly susceptible to mildew.

== Synonyms ==
Céear, Céelar, Célar, Gros Monsieur, Gros noir, Picargneau, Picargniol, Picargniot, Picarniau, Picorneau, Romain, Romano, Ronçain, César noir, Hureau, Lombard

== Notes and references ==
- This article is based in part on material from the German Wikipedia.
