= Old Heart Falls =

Single by Katatonia

from the album The Fall of Hearts
- Released: March 30, 2016
- Recorded: 2015
- Genre: Avant-garde rock
- Length: 4:22
- Label: Peaceville
- Songwriter(s): Jonas Renkse; Anders Nystrom
- Producer(s): Katatonia

Katatonia singles chronology
"Lethean" (2013)	"Old Heart Falls" (2016)	"Serein" (2016)

"Old Heart Falls" is a song by Swedish heavy metal band Katatonia. It is the first single off of their tenth studio album The Fall of Hearts.

== Background ==
"Old Heart Falls" was released as the first single from Katatonia's tenth studio album, The Fall of Hearts. It was released on March 30, 2016, almost two months prior to the release of its respective album. A music video was released for the track on the same date. The video was centered around a man typing out the song's lyrics on an old typewriter. Guitarist Anders Nystrom described the idea behind the video:

Knowing we didn't want another 'font circus' with all these words and letters competing in Olympic acrobatics, we decided to make it extremely simple but also very real...30 years ago when we were active in the underground tape-trading scene, there were no computers around, so we had to write all our letters by hand, or when feeling extra motivated, we used a typewriter...I clearly remember writing letters on a typewriter with a ribbon directly to paper created a special feeling that no computer would ever emulate.

The music video was created by Lasse Hoile, frequent video collaborator with Steven Wilson of Porcupine Tree.

== Composition and themes ==
Billboard reported that Renkse described the song as "lush textures, distinct dynamics, and memorable chorus", but that it wasn't meant to represent the sound of the entire album, which was not released at the time of the song's release. AllMusic described the song's composition as containing "modal melody and syncopated dynamic structure, offers fat crescendoes and dropouts as swirling Mellotron strings, keyboard-simulated vibraphones, and a layers of reverb is cinematic in scope." Lyrically, the song was noted for its said lyrics, with outlets like MetalSucks noting the lyrics appeared to be "full of lamenting one's heartache and wondering why the world allows such agony to exist." Encountering sorrow, and leaving behind one's dreams, are repeatedly alluded to over the course of the song.

== Reception ==
The song was generally well received by critics. In their dedicated song review, MetalSucks praised the song, but conceded that its lyrical content was "his song is super, super sad...sadder than Edgar Allan Poe", and that the music video accentuated the song's themes even further. Similarly, Metal Injection, alluded to the song's gloominess, but concluded that "At no point should you even question if this song is going to be on repeat for the rest of the day, and if it's going to be stuck in your head for the next week. You know it will be, and you know it is." Yell Magazine described the song as "tragically beautiful".

== Personnel ==
Band

- Jonas Renkse – lead vocals, keyboards
- Anders Nyström – guitars, keyboards, backing vocals
- Roger Öjersson – guitars
- Niklas Sandin – bass
- Daniel Moilanen – drums

Production

- Jonas Renkse – production
- Anders Nystrom – production
- Jens Bogren – mixing, mastering
