= Argant =

Variety of red wine grape

- Grape (Vitis)
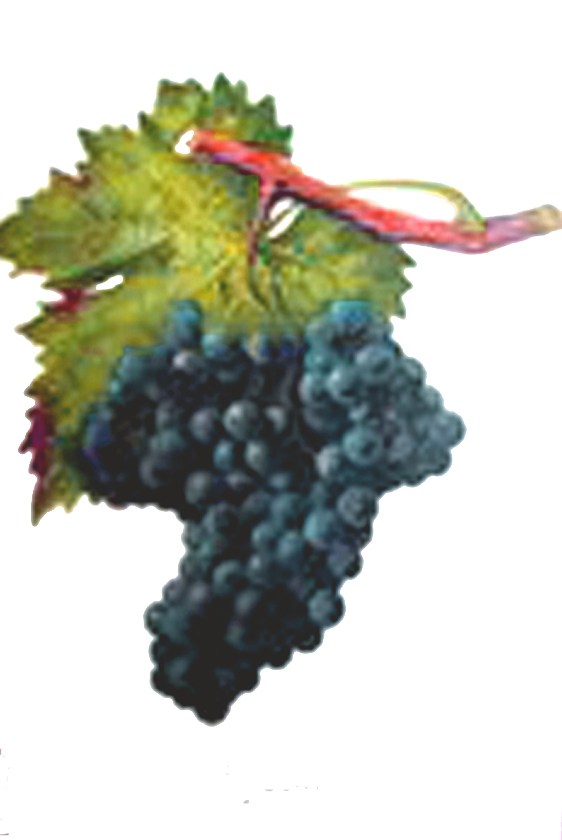
- Drawing of Argant from an early 20th-century ampelography text
- Color of berry skin: Noir
- Species: Vitis vinifera
- Also called: Espagnol, Gros Margillien, Gänsfüßer (more);
- Origin: Spain
- Notable regions: Jura
- VIVC number: 586

Argant is an ancient variety of red wine grape. It originated in Spain and may have been taken to eastern France by the Romans. It was briefly popular, but little of it remains today. It used to be common in southwestern Germany and in Austria under the name Gänsfüßer ("the one having goose-like feet"). The name refers to the leaf shape, which resembles the foot of a goose.

== History ==
As the alternative name Espagnol suggests, tradition says that Argant came from Spain. It appears on a list of 14 varieties recommended for winemaking in the Jura in 1774, and plantings seem to have expanded over the next century, but were never very extensive and the story seems to have been one of decline since then.

One claim to fame is as a parent, with Pinot noir, of the Burgundian variety César, which inherits color and tannins from Argant. Unfortunately it also inherited Argant's early bud break, which makes it susceptible to frost. César (also known as 'Romain') takes its name from the tradition that it was brought to Burgundy by the Romans - since Pinot is native to eastern France it is more likely that if any grape was carried by the legions, it would have been Argant rather than its offspring.

== Distribution and Wines ==
The variety of synonyms point to Argant having been planted across a wide area of Western Europe, but little survives today. The Jura was always something of a stronghold, and there's almost none left there now.

== Vine and Viticulture ==
One reason for Argant's popularity in the 19th century was its good resistance to mildew.

== Synonyms ==
Argan, Blauer Gansfüsser, Bockshorn, Buchser, Erlenbacher, Espagnol, Gänsfüßer (Gaensfuesser), Gaensfuesser Blau, Gänsfüßler (Gaensfuessler), Gros Margilien Espagnol, Gros Margillien, Gros Margillien Arbois, Grossrote, Margillien, Margillin, Rouillot, Tokai Chernyi, Tokai Rannii.

== See also ==
- Mourvèdre - another Spanish grape that made its home in southeast France.
