= Bassou =

- Commune
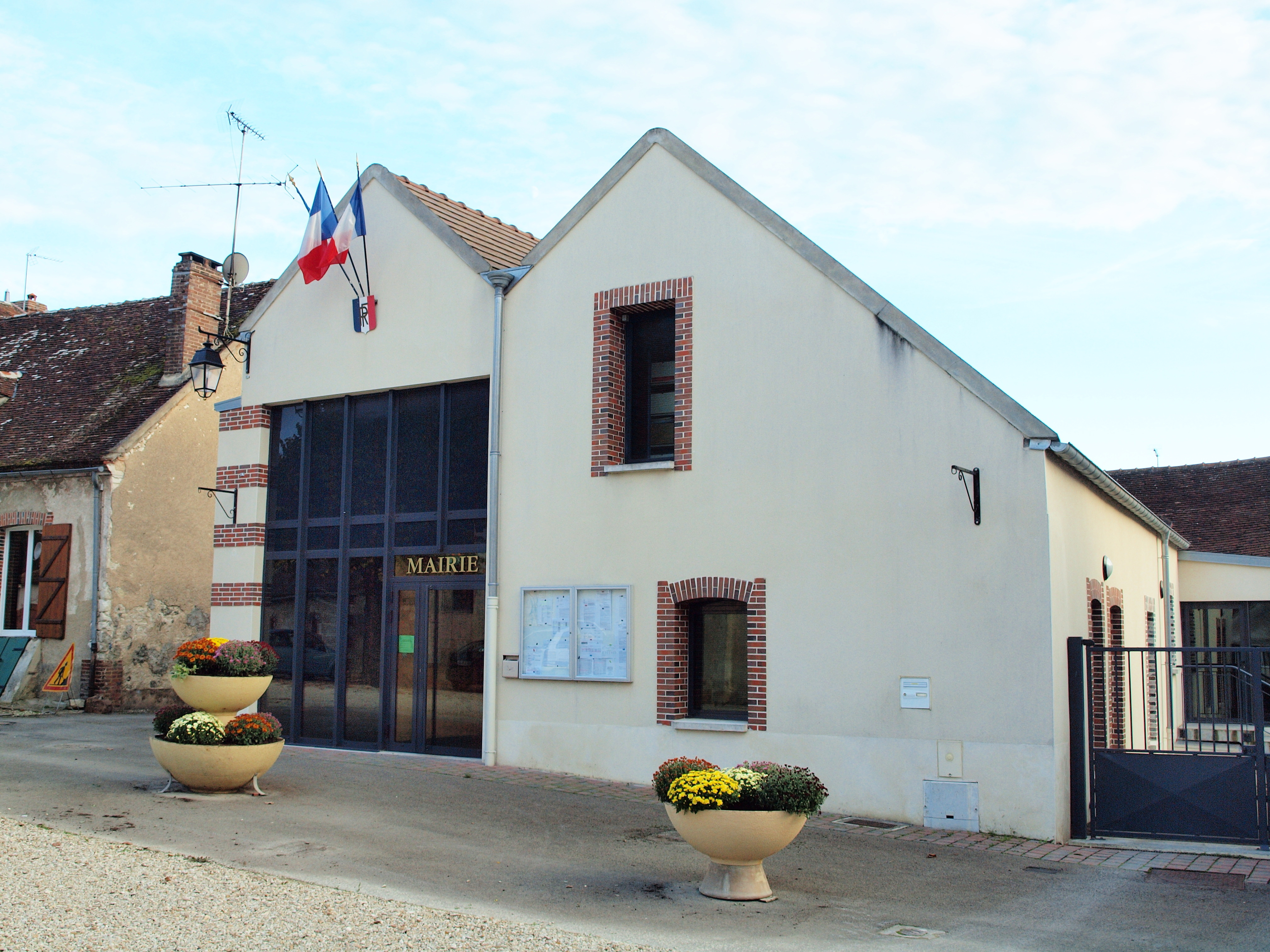
- The town hall in Bassou
- Location of Bassou
- Location within France Location within Bourgogne-Franche-Comté
- Coordinates: 47°55′29″N 3°30′58″E
- Country: France
- Region: Bourgogne-Franche-Comté
- Department: Yonne
- Arrondissement: Auxerre
- Canton: Migennes

Government
  - Mayor (2020–2026): Dorothée Moreau
- Area^{1}: 4.08 km^{2} (1.58 sq mi)
- Highest elevation: 164 m (538 ft)
- Lowest elevation: 81 m (266 ft)
- Population (2023): 869
  - Density: 213/km^{2} (552/sq mi)
- Time zone: UTC+01:00 (CET)
  - Summer (DST): UTC+02:00 (CEST)
- INSEE/Postal code: 89029 /89400
- ^{1} French Land Register data, which excludes lakes, ponds, glaciers > 1 km^{2} (0.386 sq mi or 247 acres) and river estuaries.

Bassou (French pronunciation: [basu]) is a commune in the Yonne department in Bourgogne-Franche-Comté in north-central France.

== See also ==
- Communes of the Yonne department
