= Serein =

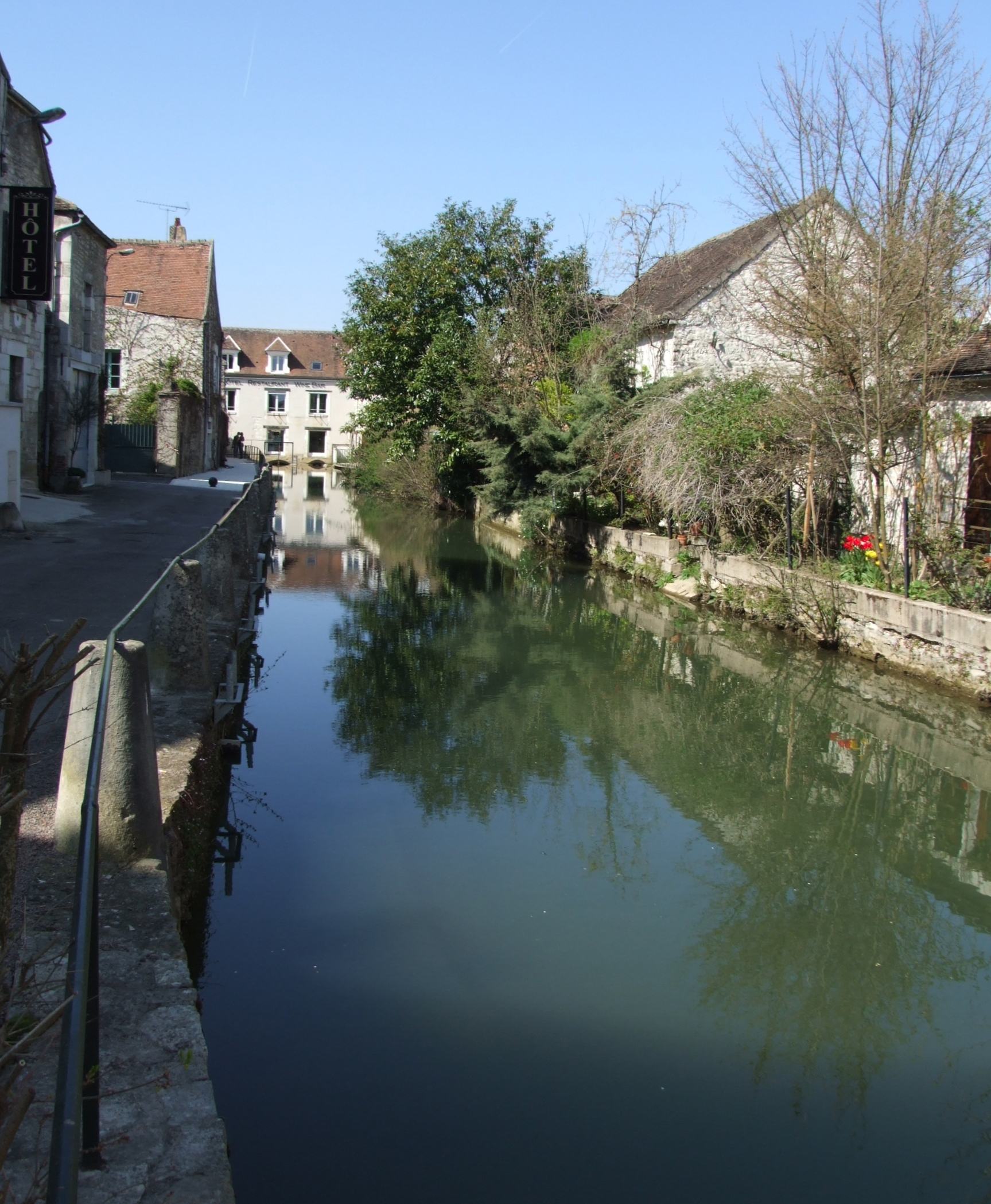
- The Serein at Chablis

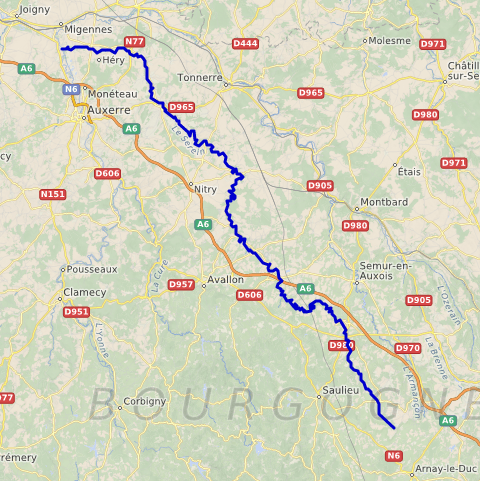

Location
- Country: France

Physical characteristics
- Source
  - location: Burgundy
- Mouth
  - location: Yonne
  - coordinates: 47°55′21″N 3°31′30″E
- Length: 188 km (117 mi)
- Basin size: 1,120 km^{2} (430 mi^{2})

Basin features
- Progression: Yonne→ Seine→ English Channel

The Serein (French pronunciation: [səʁɛ̃]) is a river of eastern France. It is the main waterway of the Chablis wine district in Burgundy. It is 188 km (117 mi) long. The Serein is not navigable.

== Origin of the name ==
Serein is the French word for "serene". This may reflect the placid nature of its course, or the strong monastic tradition in the area.

== Geography ==
The Serein rises in the Auxois hills at Arconcey and flows north-north-west into the Yonne at Bassou. Both the A6 Autoroute du Soleil and the Paris-Lyon railway line follow a similar route through the area.

=== Main tributaries of the Serein and their length ===
The Serein has the following tributaries over 10 km length:

- Baigne (L) – 14 km
- Soutain (L) – 13 km
- Argentalet (L) – 26 km
- Ru du Champ Millet (R) – 10 km
- Ru de Vaucharme (L) – 16 km

note: R=Right L=Left

=== Départements and towns crossed ===
From source to mouth:

- Côte-d'Or: Arconcey, La Motte-Ternant, Époisses
- Yonne: Montréal, L'Isle-sur-Serein, Noyers, Chablis, Pontigny Abbey, Bassou

== History ==
The history of the area is dominated by the Church at Pontigny and nearby Auxerre, whose remit extended to building the famous castle at Noyers.

== See also ==
- Chablis wine
