= Serein (song) =

Single by Katatonia

from the album The Fall of Hearts
- Released: 10 May 2016
- Recorded: 2015
- Studio: Studio Gröndahl, Tri-lamb studio, Stockholm
- Genre: Progressive rock
- Length: 4:46
- Label: Peaceville
- Songwriter(s): Jonas Renkse; Anders Nystrom
- Producer(s): Renkse, Nystrom

Katatonia singles chronology
"Old Heart Falls" (2016)	"Serein" (2016)	"Lacquer" (2020)

"Serein" is a song by Swedish heavy metal band Katatonia. It is the second single off of their tenth studio album The Fall of Hearts. The song title alludes to the concept of raining without clouds being visible.

== Background ==
The song was first released as the second single off of Katatonia's tenth studio album The Fall of Hearts on 3 May 2016. The song's official music video was debuted a week later exclusively through Billboard's website. The video features a man writing the song's lyrics in pen and paper in black and white video.

== Themes and composition ==
The word "Serein" was described by guitarist Anders Nystrom to mean "when rain falls but you can’t see any cloud". (Alternatively defined to mean "fine rain falling after sunset from a sky in which no clouds are visible".) Nystrom says that the song title is meant to be a cryptic metaphor, and refused to describe what is truly being described in the context of the song. Frontman and lead vocalist Jonas Renkse described the song as "one of the more straight-forward songs on the album, very guitar-driven, quite upbeat but still packed with emotion." Loudwire noted the similarity to 1980's new wave music such as The Cure and The Mission, due to its "gentle strumming and a soft lead... Jonas Renkse’s soothing, multi-tracked voice... a slightly uptempo rhythm [...] uplifting and pop-inflected [...] gorgeous, understated lead work textures" A number of publications noted the song as sounding less depressing than most Katatonia songs. AllMusic described the track as being "uptempo, prog pop/rocker with ringing, wrangling guitars, fat kick drums and snare, and an anthemic bridge. Metal Injection described it as "pop-meets-doom [metal]"

== Reception ==
The song was generally well-received by critics. Loudwire praised the song for its "gorgeous" lead guitar work and "larger focus on atmosphere and melody" than prior music from the band. MetalSucks praised the track for "melancholic melody, the vocal harmonies" and " a cool synth interlude in the middle that gave me the shivers", and concluding that it was a "solid entry into the Katatonia canon all around." The artistic style of the song's music video was also praised.

== Personnel ==
Band

- Jonas Renkse – lead vocals, keyboards
- Anders Nyström – guitars, keyboards, backing vocals
- Roger Öjersson – guitars
- Niklas Sandin – bass
- Daniel Moilanen – drums

Production

- Jonas Renkse – production
- Anders Nystrom – production
- Jens Bogren – mixing, mastering
