= Serein (meteorology) =

Rain falling from a cloudless sky

Serein (/sɪˈriːn/; French: [səʁɛ̃]) refers to rain falling from a cloudless sky. This sort of rain is said to take the form of a fine, light drizzle, typically after dusk. The name derives from French serein, meaning "serene", or "clear" (as in unclouded). An alternative etymology is from Old French serain, evening.

One possible explanation is cloud droplets evaporating at the same time as rain drops are formed. Another explanation is that the rain is not actually originating above where it falls, but rather is being blown from a distant cloud by strong winds at altitude. (which may not be felt at ground level due to a high vertical wind shear)

In extremely rare cases, high humidity can also cause a local drop in temperature, and the water vapor may condense impromptu to fall out of the air directly below, although needing very specific conditions fixed in a specific time interval for the change in temperature to be inversely proportional to a small amount of sample time.

== See also ==
- Sunshower
