= Chablis =

- Commune
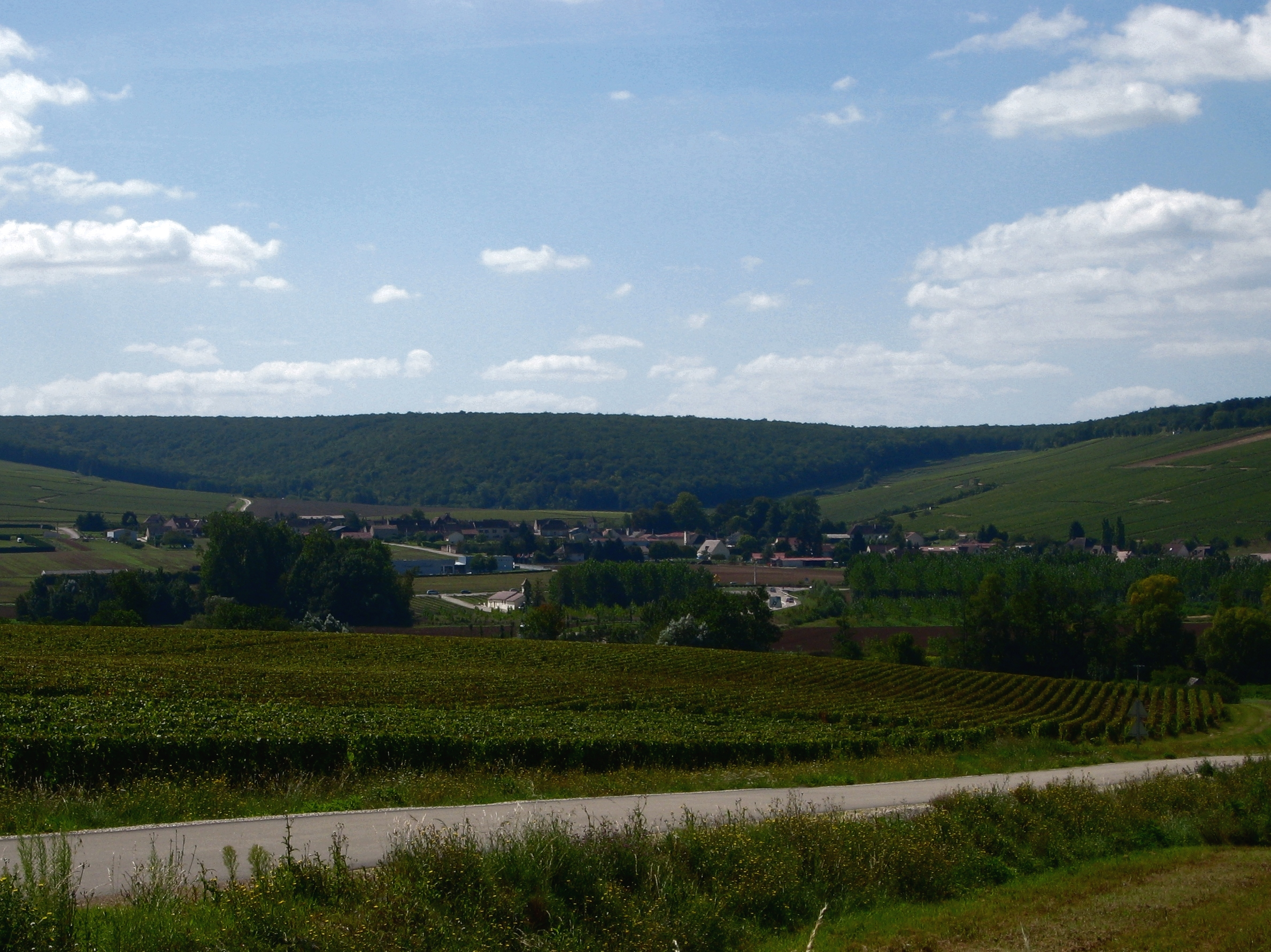
- A general view of Chablis

- Coat of arms
- Location of Chablis
- Location within France Location within Bourgogne-Franche-Comté
- Coordinates: 47°48′56″N 3°47′51″E
- Country: France
- Region: Bourgogne-Franche-Comté
- Department: Yonne
- Arrondissement: Auxerre
- Canton: Chablis

Government
  - Mayor (2020–2026): Marie-José Vaillant
- Area^{1}: 38.83 km^{2} (14.99 sq mi)
- Elevation: 140 m (460 ft)
- Highest elevation: 311 m (1,020 ft)
- Lowest elevation: 126 m (413 ft)
- Population (2023): 2,139
  - Density: 55.09/km^{2} (142.7/sq mi)
- Time zone: UTC+01:00 (CET)
  - Summer (DST): UTC+02:00 (CEST)
- INSEE/Postal code: 89068 /89800
- ^{1} French Land Register data, which excludes lakes, ponds, glaciers > 1 km^{2} (0.386 sq mi or 247 acres) and river estuaries.

Chablis (French pronunciation: [ʃabli]) is a town and commune in the Yonne department in Bourgogne-Franche-Comté in north-central France.

It lies in the valley of the River Serein.

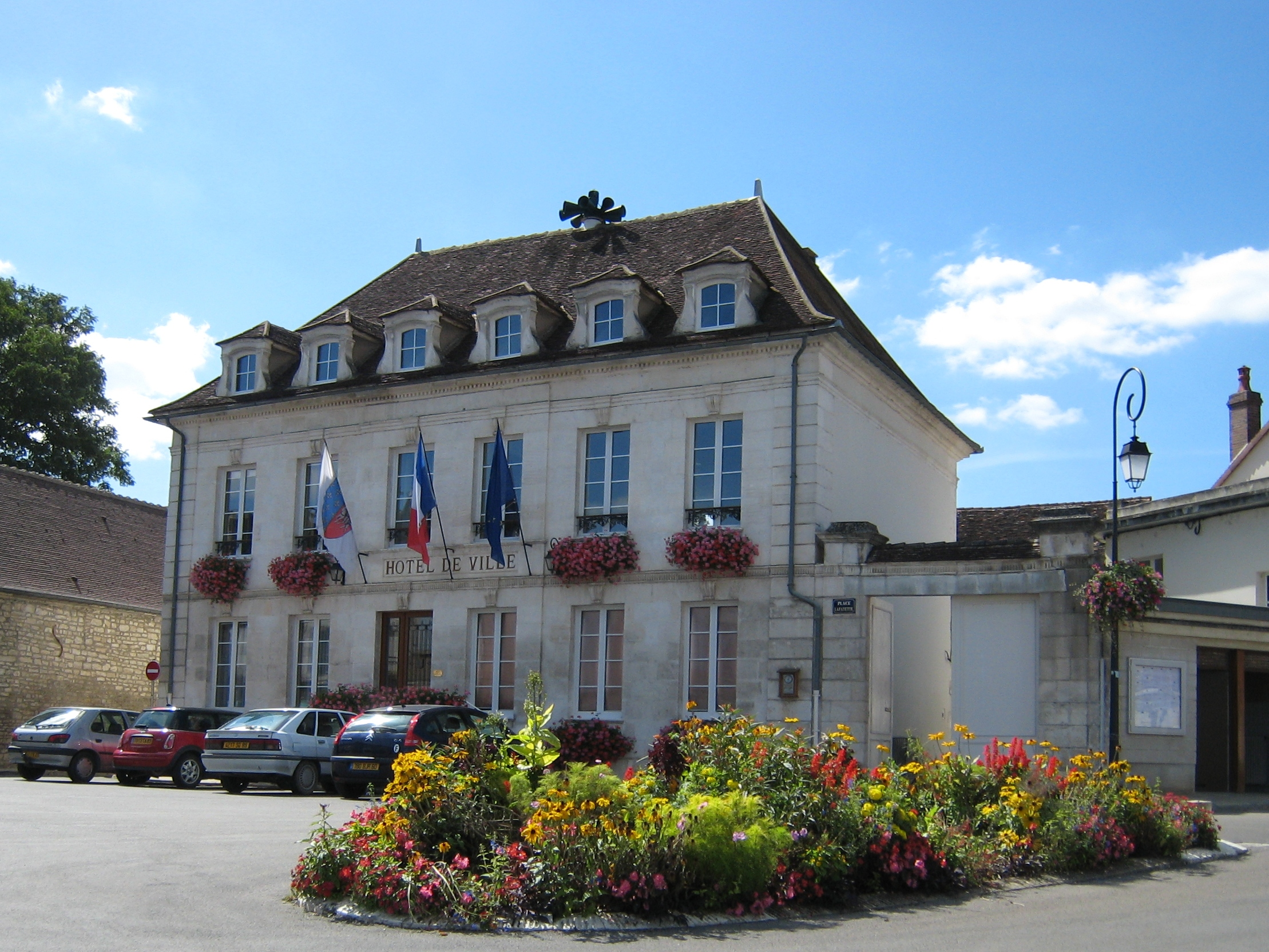
Chablis town hall

== Wine ==
The village of Chablis gives its name to one of the most famous French white wines. Chablis is made with Chardonnay, a grape that grows particularly well in the region.

== Population ==
Historical population
Year	Pop.	±% p.a.
1968	2,287	—
1975	2,408	+0.74%
1982	2,414	+0.04%
1990	2,569	+0.78%
1999	2,594	+0.11%
2007	2,472	−0.60%
2012	2,273	−1.66%
2017	2,274	+0.01%
2023	2,139	−1.01%
Source: INSEE

== Events ==
Each year the Festival du Chablisien is held May to June in Chablis, featuring classical, jazz, and world music.

The fifth stage of the 2007 Tour de France departed from Chablis towards Autun.

== Climate ==
Climate data for Chablis (1991–2020 normals, extremes 1962–present)
Month	Jan	Feb	Mar	Apr	May	Jun	Jul	Aug	Sep	Oct	Nov	Dec	Year
Record high °C (°F)	16.9 (62.4)	22.7 (72.9)	27.3 (81.1)	30.4 (86.7)	33.5 (92.3)	41.6 (106.9)	42.6 (108.7)	41.8 (107.2)	36.2 (97.2)	31.0 (87.8)	24.1 (75.4)	18.6 (65.5)	42.6 (108.7)
Mean daily maximum °C (°F)	7.1 (44.8)	8.8 (47.8)	13.2 (55.8)	17.0 (62.6)	20.8 (69.4)	24.5 (76.1)	27.2 (81.0)	27.0 (80.6)	22.4 (72.3)	17.2 (63.0)	11.1 (52.0)	7.8 (46.0)	17.0 (62.6)
Daily mean °C (°F)	3.9 (39.0)	4.6 (40.3)	7.6 (45.7)	10.5 (50.9)	14.4 (57.9)	17.9 (64.2)	20.2 (68.4)	20.0 (68.0)	16.0 (60.8)	12.3 (54.1)	7.4 (45.3)	4.6 (40.3)	11.6 (52.9)
Mean daily minimum °C (°F)	0.6 (33.1)	0.3 (32.5)	2.1 (35.8)	4.1 (39.4)	8.0 (46.4)	11.3 (52.3)	13.2 (55.8)	13.1 (55.6)	9.7 (49.5)	7.3 (45.1)	3.6 (38.5)	1.4 (34.5)	6.2 (43.2)
Record low °C (°F)	−24.2 (−11.6)	−20.3 (−4.5)	−15.1 (4.8)	−6.0 (21.2)	−2.4 (27.7)	−0.5 (31.1)	2.0 (35.6)	1.5 (34.7)	−2.0 (28.4)	−7.0 (19.4)	−11.6 (11.1)	−19.1 (−2.4)	−24.2 (−11.6)
Average precipitation mm (inches)	57.2 (2.25)	51.8 (2.04)	54.4 (2.14)	62.4 (2.46)	73.2 (2.88)	56.9 (2.24)	59.0 (2.32)	59.2 (2.33)	58.6 (2.31)	73.9 (2.91)	66.3 (2.61)	67.4 (2.65)	740.3 (29.15)
Average precipitation days (≥ 1.0 mm)	11.2	10.7	10.3	9.7	10.6	9.3	8.7	8.3	8.4	10.8	11.6	12.1	121.8
Source: Meteociel

== See also ==
- Communes of the Yonne department
