= Fisher (surname) =

Fisher is an English occupational name for one who obtained a living by fishing.

== A ==
- Aaron R. Fisher (1895–1985), United States Army officer
- Abbi Fisher (born 1957), American alpine skier
- Abby Fisher (c.1831–1915), American slave and writer
- Ada Fisher (1947–2022), American physician and politician
- Ada Lois Sipuel Fisher (1924–1995), American civil rights activist
- Adam Fisher, American baseball executive
- Adrian Fisher (maze designer) (born 1951), maze designer
- Adrian Fisher (musician) (1952–2000), British musician
- Adrian S. Fisher (1914–1983), American lawyer
- Aiden Fisher (born 2003), American football player
- Aileen Fisher (1906–2002), American writer
- Aimee Fisher (born 1995), New Zealand canoeist
- Al Fisher (born 1986), American basketball player
- Alan Fisher (disambiguation), multiple people
- Alastair Fisher, Scottish rugby union player
- Albert Fisher (disambiguation), multiple people
- Alexander Fisher (disambiguation) or Alex Fisher, multiple people
- Alexandra Fisher (born 1988), Kazakhstani shot putter
- Alfred Fisher (rugby league), English rugby league player
- Alice Fisher (disambiguation), multiple people
- Allan George Barnard Fisher, New Zealand-born economist
- Allen Fisher (born 1944), British poet
- Allison Fisher (born 1968), English pool and snooker player
- Almond E. Fisher (1913–1982), United States Army officer and Medal of Honor recipient
- Alvan Fisher (1792–1863), American painter
- Alvin Fisher (1893–1937), Canadian ice hockey player
- Amanda Fisher, British cell biologist
- Amy Fisher (born 1974), American criminal
- Andrew Fisher (disambiguation) or Andy Fisher, multiple people
- Angie Fisher, American singer
- Anna Fisher (disambiguation), multiple people
- Anne Fisher (disambiguation), multiple people
- Annie Fisher (1867–1938), American cook and entrepreneur
- Anthony Fisher (disambiguation) or Antony Fisher, multiple people
- Antwone Fisher (born 1959), the subject of a 2002 film based on his life
- Archie Fisher (1939–2025), Scottish folk singer
- Archie Fisher (painter) (1896–1959), New Zealand painter
- Arnie Fisher (born 1938), American bridge player
- Arthur Fisher (disambiguation), multiple people
- Ashley Fisher (born 1975), Australian tennis player
- Ashley Lauren Fisher (born 1975), American model and restaurateur
- A.S.T. Fisher (20th century), English clergyman and writer
- Avery Fisher (1906–1994), American audio engineer

== B ==
- B. H. Fisher ("Red" Fisher, 1914–2006), American writer and outdoorsman
- Barb Fisher (fl. c. 2000), Canadian politician
- Barbara Loe Fisher (fl. late 20th century), American chiropractor
- Ben Fisher (born 1981), Scottish rugby league player
- Benjamin Fisher (1842–1920), Australian accountant and auctioneer
- Benjamin F. Fisher (1834–1915), American general
- Bernard Fisher (disambiguation), multiple people
- Bernice Fisher (1916–1966), American civil rights activist
- Bertie Fisher (1878–1972), British general
- Beth Fisher (artist) (born 1944), American artist
- Bob Fisher (disambiguation), multiple people
- Bobby Fisher (footballer) (born 1956), English footballer
- Brad Fisher (born 1984), Australian rules footballer
- Brandy Fisher (born 1975), American women's ice hockey player
- Braydon Fisher (born 2000), American baseball player
- Brenda Fisher (1927–2022), English long-distance swimmer
- Brent Fisher (born 1983), New Zealand footballer
- Brian Fisher (disambiguation) or Bryan Fisher, multiple people
- Bruce Fisher (born 1954), American songwriter, record producer and playwright
- Bryce Fisher (born 1977), American football player
- Bud Fisher (1885–1954), American cartoonist

== C ==
- Carl Anthony Fisher (1945–1993), American Roman Catholic bishop
- Carl G. Fisher (1874–1939), American entrepreneur
- Carlos Fisher (born 1983), American baseball player
- Carrie Fisher (1956–2016), American actress, writer and humorist
- Catherine Fisher (disambiguation), multiple people
- Cathrew Fisher (1871–1929), English Anglican bishop
- Celia B. Fisher, American developmental psychologist
- Cevin Fisher (1963–2026), American music producer
- C. B. Fisher (1817–1908) Australian pastoralist and racehorse breeder
- Charles Fisher (disambiguation) or Charlie Fisher, multiple people
- Charron Fisher (born 1985), American basketball player
- Cherokee Fisher (1844–1912), American baseball player
- Chris Fisher (disambiguation), multiple people
- Cicely Corbett Fisher (1885–1959), British suffragist
- Cilla Fisher (born 1952), founding member of The Singing Kettle
- Cindy Fisher (basketball) (born 1964), American women's basketball coach
- Cindy Fisher (actress) (born 1960), American actress
- Clara Fisher (1811–1898), English actress
- Clarence Fisher (disambiguation), multiple people
- Clarkson Sherman Fisher (1921–1997), American judge
- Clem Fisher (1908–1988), Australian rules footballer
- Clement Fisher (disambiguation), multiple people
- C. Miller Fisher (1913–2012), Canadian neurologist
- Col Fisher (1923–2003), Australian politician
- Colin Fisher (born 1949), Scottish rugby union player
- Connie Fisher (born 1983), British actress, singer and television presenter
- Constance Fisher (1929–1973), American serial killer
- Corey Fisher (born 1988), American basketball player
- Craig Fisher (born 1970), Canadian ice hockey player
- Craig B. Fisher (1932–2006), American television producer
- Cynthia Fisher (born 1961), American businesswoman

== D ==
- Daisy Fisher (1888–1967), English writer and playwright
- Dana R. Fisher, American sociologist
- Daniel Fisher (disambiguation), Danny Fisher or Dan Fisher, multiple people
- Danielle Fisher (born 1985), American mountain climber
- Darius Fisher, English filmmaker and producer
- Darnell Fisher (born 1994), English footballer
- Darren Fisher (born 1965), Canadian politician
- Darren Paul Fisher, British screenwriter, film producer and director
- Darryl Fisher (born 1976), New Zealand rugby league player, coach and administrator
- David Fisher (disambiguation), multiple people
- Davis Fisher (born 1997), American motorcycle racer
- Dean Fisher (born 1956), American politician
- Denys Fisher (1918–2002), English engineer and inventor
- Derek Fisher (born 1974), American basketball player and coach
- Derek Fisher (baseball) (born 1993), American baseball player
- Devon Fisher (born 1993), American soccer player
- Diane Gilliam Fisher (born 1957), American poet
- D. Michael Fisher (born 1944), American judge
- Don Fisher (1916–1973), American baseball player
- Donald Fisher (1928–2009), American entrepreneur
- Doris Fisher (disambiguation), multiple people
- Dorothy Canfield Fisher (1879–1958), American author
- Douglas Fisher (disambiguation) or Doug Fisher, multiple people
- Dudley Fisher (1890–1951), American cartoonist
- Dudu Fisher (born 1951), Israeli cantor, actor and singer
- Dunc Fisher (1927–2017), Canadian ice hockey player

== E ==
- Ebon Fisher, American artist
- Ed Fisher (disambiguation), multiple people
- Eddie Fisher (drummer) (born 1973), American drummer
- Eddie Fisher (singer) (1928–2010), American singer
- Edmund Fisher (architect) (1872–1918), British architect
- Edmund Fisher (publisher) (1939–1995), British publisher
- Edward Fisher (disambiguation) or Eddie Fisher, multiple people
- Edwin Fisher (disambiguation), multiple people
- Eileen Fisher (born 1950), American clothing designer and businesswoman
- Elizabeth Fisher (disambiguation), multiple people
- Ellen Thayer Fisher (1847–1911), American botanical illustrator
- Elliott S. Fisher, American health researcher and advocate
- Elmer H. Fisher (1840–1905), American architect
- Else Fisher (1918–2006), Swedish choreographer, dancer, theatre director and writer
- Elsie Fisher (born 2003), American actor
- Elvis Fisher (born 1988), American football player
- Emmanuel Fisher (1921–2001), British composer and conductor
- English Fisher (c. 1928–2011), American boxing trainer
- Ephraim S. Fisher (1815–1876), justice of the Mississippi High Court of Errors and Appeals
- Eric Fisher (cricketer) (1924–1996), New Zealand cricketer
- Eric Fisher (American football) (born 1991), American football offensive tackle
- Erik Fisher (born 1985), American alpine skier
- Evelyn Fisher (died 2002), American politician
- Ezra Fisher (1800–1874), American Baptist missionary and pioneer

== F ==
- Florrie Fisher (1918–1972), American motivational speaker
- Frances Fisher (born 1952), British-American actress
- Francesca Fisher-Eastwood (born 1993), American actress
- Francis Fisher (1877–1960), New Zealand politician
- Frank Fisher (disambiguation), multiple people
- Franklin M. Fisher (1934–2019), American economist
- Frederic Fisher (1851–1943), British Royal Navy officer
- Frederick Fisher (disambiguation), Fred Fisher or Freddie Fisher, multiple people
- Fritz Fisher (born 1941), American baseball player

== G ==
- Gail Fisher (1935–2000), American actress
- Garrett Fisher (born 1970), American composer
- Garth Fisher (born 1958), American plastic surgeon
- Gary Fisher (born 1950), American cyclist and engineer
- Gary Fisher (footballer) (born 1992), Scottish footballer
- Gavin Fisher (born 1964), American engineer
- Gene Fisher, American poker player
- Geoffrey Fisher (1887–1972), British religious leader
- George Fisher (disambiguation), multiple people
- Gerry Fisher (1926–2014), English cinematographer
- Gideon Fisher (born 1965), Israeli lawyer
- Gilbert Dempster Fisher (1906–1985), Scottish naturalist, writer and broadcaster
- Gladys Caldwell Fisher (1907–1952), American sculptor
- Grant Fisher (born 1997), Canadian-born American long-distance runner
- Grant U. Fisher, American politician
- Greevz Fisher, Anglo-Irish businessman, anarchist, activist, philologist
- Gregg S. Fisher, American investment manager
- Gregor Fisher (born 1953), Scottish comedian and actor
- Gus Fisher (baseball) (1885–1972), American baseball player
- Gus Fisher (fashion) (1920–2010), New Zealand philanthropist
- Guy Fisher (born 1947), American mobster

== H ==
- H. A. L. Fisher (1865–1940), English historian, educator and politician
- Ham Fisher (1900/01–1955), American artist/cartoonist
- Harold Fisher (disambiguation), multiple people
- Harrison Fisher (1875 or 1877 – 1934), American illustrator
- Harry Fisher (disambiguation), multiple people
- Hart D. Fisher, American writer
- Harvey Sid Fisher (born 1940), American musician
- Hayes Fisher, 1st Baron Downham (1853–1920), British politician
- Heather Fisher (born 1984), English rugby union and rugby sevens player
- Hector Fisher, Swiss tennis player
- Helen Fisher (disambiguation), multiple people
- Hendrick Fisher (1697–1779), American politician
- Hendrick V. Fisher (1846–1909), American businessman and politician
- Henry Fisher (disambiguation), multiple people
- Herbert Fisher (disambiguation), multiple people
- Herman Fisher (1898–1975), American businessman
- Horace Fisher (1903–1974), English cricketer
- Horace Fisher (painter) (1861–1928), British painter
- Horatio Gates Fisher (1838–1890), American politician
- Howard T. Fisher (1903–1979), American architect, city planner and educator
- Hubert Fisher (1877–1941), American politician
- Hugh Fisher (disambiguation), multiple people
- Hugo Anton Fisher (1854–1916), Czech-American painter

== I ==
- Ian Fisher (disambiguation), multiple people
- Idwal Fisher (1935–2012), Welsh rugby union and league player
- India Fisher (born 1974), British actress
- Ingals Fisher (1909–1942), American sport shooter
- Ira Joe Fisher (born 1947), American journalist
- Irving Fisher (1867–1947), American economist and activist
- Isaac Fisher (1851–1944), Australian cricket umpire
- Isaac Fisher (educator) (1877–1957), American educator
- Isla Fisher (born 1976), Australian actress, voice actress and writer
- Ivan Fisher (born 1943), American lawyer

== J ==
- J. Fisher (Yorkshire cricketer), English cricketer
- Jackie Fisher (disambiguation), multiple people
- Jake Fisher (born 1993), American football player
- James Fisher (disambiguation), multiple people
- Jameson Fisher (born 1995), American baseball player
- Jane Lane, Lady Fisher (c. 1626 – 1689), English activist
- Janice Fisher, American politician
- Jasen Fisher, American child actor
- Jasper Fisher (fl. 1639), English divine and dramatist
- Jean Fisher (1942–2016), English art critic
- Jeannie Fisher (born 1947), Scottish actress
- Jeff Fisher (disambiguation) or Jeffrey Fisher, multiple people
- Jennifer Fisher (art historian), Canadian art historian and curator
- Jennifer Fisher (athlete), Bermudian runner
- Jennifer Fisher (designer), American jewelry designer
- Jeremy Fisher (disambiguation), multiple people
- Jerrold Fisher, American composer
- Jerry Fisher (born 1942), American singer
- Jessica Fisher (born 1976), American poet, translator and critic
- Jimbo Fisher (born 1965), American football player and coach
- Jimmie Lou Fisher (1941–2022), American politician
- Jo Fisher, New Zealand soccer player
- Joan Fisher (born 1949), Canadian sprinter
- Jodie Fisher (born 1960), American actress
- Joel Fisher (disambiguation), multiple people
- Joely Fisher (born 1967), American actress and singer
- John Fisher (disambiguation), Jackie Fisher or Jack Fisher, multiple people
- Jon Fisher (born 1972), American entrepreneur, philanthropist and inventor
- Jon Fisher (rugby union) (born 1988), English rugby union player
- Jonah Fisher, British television journalist
- Jonathan Fisher (disambiguation), multiple people
- Jordan Fisher (born 1994), American singer, dancer and actor
- Joseph Fisher (disambiguation) or Joe Fisher, multiple people
- Josh Fisher (born c. 1950s), American computer scientist
- Josh Fisher (basketball) (born 1980), American basketball player and coach
- Joshua Fisher (merchant) (1707–1783), American merchant and cartographer
- Joshua Fisher (Massachusetts politician), colonial Massachusetts politician
- Joshua Francis Fisher (1807–1873), American author and philanthropist
- Jules Fisher (born 1937), American lighting designer
- Juni Fisher (born c. 1957), American musician
- Justin Fisher (disambiguation), multiple people

== K ==
- Karen Fisher, New Zealand geographer
- Kate Fisher (1850–1940), American prostitute, also known as Big Nose Kate
- Kathleen Fisher, American computer scientist
- Keith Fisher, American ice hockey coach
- Kelly Fisher (born 1978), British snooker player
- Kelly Fisher (model) (born 1967), American model
- Ken Fisher (disambiguation), multiple people
- Kendra Fisher (born 1979), Canadian ice hockey player
- Kenneth Fisher (born 1950), American financial manager and journalist
- Kenneth Fisher (educationalist) (1882–1945), British educationalist
- Kevin Fisher (disambiguation), multiple people
- Kimberly Fisher, American politician
- King Fisher (1853–1884), American gunslinger
- Kitty Fisher (died 1767), British courtesan
- Kyle Fisher (born 1994), American soccer player

== L ==
- Lala Fisher (1872–1929), Australian poet, writer and editor
- Lamar Fisher, American politician
- Larry Fisher (1907–2001), American real estate developer
- Larry Fisher (murderer) (1949–2015), Canadian criminal
- Laurie Fisher, Australian rugby union coach
- Lavinia Fisher (1793–1820), American serial killer
- Lee Fisher (born 1951), American businessman, lawyer and politician
- Leigh Fisher (born 1984), Australian rules footballer and umpire
- Lenora Fisher (born 1937), Canadian swimmer
- Leonard Fisher (1881–1963), English Anglican bishop
- Leonard Everett Fisher (1924–2024), American artist
- Les Fisher (born 1941), Royal Australian Air Force officer
- Leslie Fisher (1906–1988), English Anglican priest
- Lester E. Fisher, American zoologist
- Lettice Fisher (1875–1956), British economist
- Levar Fisher (born 1979), American football player
- Lillian Estelle Fisher (1891–1988), American historian
- Lily-Mae Fisher (d. 2026), Royal Navy commando
- Linda Fisher, American businesswoman
- Lorraine Fisher (1928–2007), American baseball player
- Lotan Fisher, Israeli bridge player
- Louis Fisher (politician) (1913–2001), American politician
- Louis Matshwenyego Fisher, Botswana general
- Luchina Fisher American journalist, film director, writer and producer
- Lucy Fisher (born 1949), American film producer

== M ==
- Mandy Fisher (born 1962), English snooker and billiards player
- Marc Fisher (born 1958), American journalist
- Margaret Fisher (c. 1874 – 1958), wife of Andrew Fisher, Prime Minister of Australia
- Maria Anna Fisher (1819–1911), American businesswoman
- Marie Fisher (1931–2008), Australian politician
- Mark Fisher (disambiguation), multiple people
- Martin Fisher (disambiguation), multiple people
- Mary Fisher (disambiguation), multiple people
- Matthew Fisher (disambiguation), multiple people
- Matthew Fisher (English cricketer) (born 1997), English cricketer
- Matthew P. A. Fisher (born 1960), American theoretical physicist
- Maurice Fisher (1931–2022), American baseball player
- Max Fisher (1908–2005), American businessman and philanthropist
- Mea Fisher, American DJ
- Mel Fisher (1922–1998), American treasure hunter
- M. F. K. Fisher (1908–1992), American writer
- Michoel Fisher (c. 1910 – 2004), British rabbi and Talmudic scholar
- Mickey Fisher (politician) (1940–2021), Canadian politician
- Mickey Fisher (basketball) (1904/05–1963), American basketball coach
- Mike Fisher (ice hockey) (born 1980), Canadian hockey player
- Miles Fisher (born 1983), American actor and musician
- Morgan Fisher (born 1950), English musician
- Morgan Fisher (artist) (born 1942), American filmmaker and artist
- Morris Fisher (1890–1968), American sport shooter
- Morton P. Fisher (1897–1965), United States Tax Court judge
- Myrta Fisher (1917–1999), British artist

== N ==
- Nate Fisher (born 1996), American baseball player
- Nathan Fisher (born 1989), English footballer
- Neil Fisher (born 1970), English footballer
- Nellie Ivy Fisher (1907–1995), London-born industrial chemist
- Newt Fisher (1871–1947), American baseball player
- Nick Fisher, multiple people
- Nigel Fisher (1913–1996), British politician
- Nigel Fisher (United Nations), Canadian diplomat
- Noel Fisher (disambiguation), multiple people
- Norm Fisher (born 1963), Canadian bass guitarist
- Norman Fisher (disambiguation), multiple people

== O ==
- Oatten Fisher (1924–2006), American player of Canadian football
- O. C. Fisher (1903–1994), American politician and writer
- Oliver Fisher (born 1988), English golfer
- Oniel Fisher (born 1991), Jamaican footballer
- Oscar Fisher (1812–1882), American politician
- Osmond Fisher (1817–1914), English geologist

== P ==
- Paddy Fisher (born 1998), American football player
- Patrice Fisher (born 1978), American actress
- Paul Fisher (disambiguation), multiple people
- Payne Fisher (1616–1693), English poet
- Peter Fisher (disambiguation), multiple people
- Philip Fisher (disambiguation), multiple people
- Phineas Fisher, unidentified hacktivist

== R ==
- Raymond Fisher (disambiguation) or Ray Fisher, multiple people
- Rebecca Fisher (disambiguation) or Becky Fisher, multiple people
- Red Fisher (disambiguation), multiple people
- Reggie Fisher (born 1948), American record producer
- Reginald Fisher (disambiguation) or Reg Fisher, multiple people
- Rhett Fisher (born 1980), American actor, writer and record producer
- Rich Fisher (news anchor) (1949–2017), American news anchor
- Richard Fisher (disambiguation), multiple people
- Rick Fisher (disambiguation), multiple people
- Robert Fisher (disambiguation) or Rob Fisher, multiple people
- Robert William Fisher (born 1961) American Fugitive
- Robin Fisher (disambiguation), multiple people
- Robson Fisher (1921–2000), British educationalist and headmaster
- Roger Fisher (disambiguation), multiple people
- Rolland Fisher (1900–1982), American religious leader and activist
- Ron Fisher (disambiguation), multiple people
- Ronald Fisher (1890–1962), British eugenicist, statistician, and geneticist
- Rose-Lynn Fisher (born 1955), American photographer
- Ross Fisher (born 1980), English golfer
- Ross Fisher (footballer) (born 1964), Australian rules footballer
- Rowland Fisher (1885–1969), English painter
- Roy Fisher (1930–2017), British poet
- Roy M. Fisher (1918–1999), American journalist
- Rudolph Fisher (1897–1934), American writer
- Ryan Fisher (born 1983), American motorcycle speedway rider
- Ryan Fisher (triathlete) (born 1991), Australian triathlete

== S ==
- Sallie Fisher (1880–1950), American actress
- Sally Caldwell Fisher (born 1951), American painter
- Sam Fisher (disambiguation), multiple people
- Samuel Fisher (disambiguation), multiple people
- Samuel Melton Fisher (1859–1939), English artist
- Sandra Fisher (1947–1994), American painter
- Sarah Fisher (born 1980), American racing driver
- Sarah Fisher, American Episcopal bishop
- Scott Fisher (disambiguation), multiple people
- Seth Fisher (1972–2006), American comics artist
- Shannon Fisher, American radio personality, activist and writer
- Shea Fisher (born 1988), Australian singer
- Shireen Avis Fisher, American judge
- Showboat Fisher (1899–1994), American baseball player
- Shug Fisher (1907–1984), American actor, singer, songwriter, musician and comedian
- Sidney George Fisher, American lawyer and author
- Simon Fisher (born 1970), British geneticist and neuroscientist
- Sonny Fisher (1931–2005), American singer-songwriter and guitarist
- Spencer O. Fisher (1843–1919), American politician
- Spencer Fisher (born 1976), American mixed martial artist
- Stan Fisher (1911–1961), Australian rules footballer
- Stanley Fisher (1867–1949), Chief Justice of Ceylon
- Steve Fisher (disambiguation), multiple people
- Steven Fisher (disambiguation), multiple people
- Stink Fisher (born 1970), American actor and restaurateur
- Stu Fisher, English musician
- Susan Fisher (disambiguation), multiple people
- Sydney Fisher (disambiguation), multiple people
- Sylvia Fisher (1910–1996), Australian opera singer

== T ==
- Tanya Fisher, Australian women's basketball player
- Ted Fisher (1887–1954), Australian rules footballer
- Ted Fisher (politician), American politician from Oklahoma
- Terence Fisher (1904–1980), British film director
- Terry Louise Fisher (1946–2025), American screenwriter and producer
- Terry Fisher (soccer) (born 1949), American soccer coach
- Terry Fisher (racing driver) (born 1962), American racing driver
- Theodosia Abrams Fisher (1770–1849), English singer
- Thomas Fisher (disambiguation), multiple people
- Timothy S. Fisher (born 1969), American educator and engineer
- TJ Fisher, American writer
- Todd Fisher (born 1958), American actor, director, cinematographer, producer and curator
- Tom Fisher (disambiguation), multiple people
- Toni Fisher (1924–1999), American singer
- Tony Fisher (disambiguation), multiple people
- Travis Fisher (born 1979), American football player
- Trevor Fisher Jnr (born 1979), South African golfer
- Tricia Leigh Fisher (born 1968), American actress and singer
- Tyler Fisher (born 1993), South African rugby union player

== V ==
- Vardis Fisher (1895–1968), American historical novelist
- Vernon Fisher (born 1943), American artist
- Vic Fisher (1924–1999), Australian rules footballer
- Victor Fisher (1870–1954), British activist
- Vilyam Genrikhovich Fisher (1903–1971), better known as Rudolf Abel, Soviet intelligence agent
- Violet L. Fisher, American United Methodist bishop
- Viv Fisher (born 1952), British audio engineer and musician

== W ==
- Walter Fisher (disambiguation), multiple people
- Warren Fisher (civil servant), British civil servant
- Warren Fisher (rugby league), Australian rugby league player
- Warren Samuel Fisher (1878–1971), American entomologist
- Welthy Honsinger Fisher (1879–1980), American activist
- Wilbur Fisher (1894–1960), American baseball player
- William Fisher (disambiguation), multiple people
- Woolf Fisher (1912–1975), New Zealand businessman and philanthropist

== Y ==
- Yisroel Yaakov Fisher (1928–2003), Israeli rabbi

== Z ==
- Zachary Fisher (1910–1999), American businessman and philanthropist, founder of Fisher House Foundation
- Zuriah Fisher (born 2002), American football player

== Fictional characters ==
- Donald Fisher, a character from the soap opera Home and Away
- Elena Fisher, a character in the video game series Uncharted
- Jasmine Fisher, a character from the soap opera EastEnders
- Jeremy Fisher, a character in the children's book The Tale of Mr. Jeremy Fisher
- Kris Fisher, a character from the soap opera Hollyoaks
- Malachy Fisher, a character from the soap opera Hollyoaks
- Nate Fisher, a character in the television series Six Feet Under
- Phryne Fisher, protagonist of a series of detective novels by Kerry Greenwood
- Ruth Fisher, a character in the television series Six Feet Under
- Sam Fisher (Splinter Cell), protagonist of the video game series Splinter Cell

== See also ==
- Ann Fisher-Wirth (born 1947), American poet
- Norman Fisher-Jones (fl. late 20th century), British musician
- Simon Fisher-Becker, British actor
- Baron Fisher
- A Stone for Danny Fisher, a novel
