= Anne Fisher =

Anne or Ann Fisher may refer to:

- Ann Fisher (grammarian) (1719–1778), author and grammarian
- Ann Fisher-Wirth (born 1947), American poet and scholar
- Anne B. Fisher (1898–1967), American writer
- Anne Fisher, wife of Charles Connell and sister of Lewis P. Fisher
- Anne Fisher, character in Car of Dreams
- Ann Fisher, WOSU-FM talk show host

== See also ==
- Anna Fisher (disambiguation)
- Annie Fisher (1867–1938), American cook, caterer and entrepreneur
- Annie Fischer (1914–1995), Hungarian pianist
- Fisher (surname)
