= Walter Fischer =

Walter Fischer may refer to:

- Walter Fischer (footballer)
- Walter Fischer (politician)

== See also ==
- Walter Fisher (disambiguation)
