= Fontenailles =

Fontenailles is the name of two communes in France:

- Fontenailles, Seine-et-Marne, in the Seine-et-Marne département
- Fontenailles, Yonne, in the Yonne département
