= Frederick Fisher =

Frederick, Frederic, Fred or Freddie Fisher may refer to:

== Law and politics ==
- Victor Fisher (Frederick Victor Fisher, 1870–1954), British political activist
- Fred R. Fisher (1871–1959), American politician
- Fred Fisher (lawyer) (1921–1989), American lawyer

== Military ==
- Sir Frederic Fisher (1851–1943), British Royal Navy admiral
- Frederick Thomas Fisher (1872–1906), American navy sailor
- Frederick Fisher (soldier) (1894–1915), Canadian soldier

== Sports ==
- Fred Fisher (footballer, born April 1910) (1910–1944), English footballer
- Fred Fisher (footballer, born January 1910) (1910–1955), English footballer
- Fred Fisher (footballer, born 1920) (1920–1993), English footballer
- Eric Fisher (cricketer) (Frederick Eric Fisher, 1924–1996), New Zealand cricketer

== Others ==
- Fred Fisher (1875–1942), American songwriter
- Frederick Bohn Fisher (1882–1938), American religious leader
- Freddie Fisher (musician) (1904–1967), American musician
- Fredy Fisher (1922–1993), German-British journalist and businessman
- Frederick Fisher (architect), American architect

== Other uses ==
- Fisher's ghost, an Australian legend

== See also ==
- William Frederick Fisher (born 1946), American astronaut
