= Clement Fisher =

Clement Fisher may refer to:

- Clement Fisher (16th century MP) for Tamworth
- Sir Clement Fisher, 2nd Baronet (1613–1683), MP for Coventry
- Sir Clement Fisher, 3rd Baronet (c. 1675–1729), of the Fisher baronets
- Clement Fisher, (2005-), Swiss Student

== See also ==
- Fisher (surname)
