= Mary Fisher =

Mary Fisher may refer to:

- Mary Fisher (activist) (born 1948), American political activist
- Mary Fisher (mayor) (1884–1972), first woman mayor of Harrogate, England
- Mary Fisher (missionary) (c. 1623–1698), English Quaker pioneer, one of the Valiant Sixty
- Mary Fisher (swimmer) (born 1993), New Zealand Paralympian
- Mary A. Fisher (1839–1920), British-born American novelist
- Mary Jo Fisher (born 1962), Australian politician
- Mary Pat Fisher (fl. 1980s–2000s), writer and religious leader
- Mary Stuart Fisher (1922–2006), American radiologist
- Mary Winter Fisher (1867–1928), American physician
- M. F. K. Fisher (Mary Frances Kennedy Fisher, 1908–1992), American writer
- Mary Fisher, fictional romance novelist played by Meryl Streep in the 1989 film She-Devil

== See also ==
- Marie Fisher (1931–2008), Australian politician
