= Herbert Fischer =

Herbert Fischer may refer to:

- Herbert Fischer (canoeist)
- Herbert Fischer (diplomat)

== See also ==
- Herbert Fisher (disambiguation)
