= Scott Fischer (disambiguation) =

Scott Fischer was a climber.

Scott Fischer may also refer to:

- Scott Fischer (artist), American artist
- Scott Fischer (producer)
- Scott Fischer (gymnast), competed in 1999 Trampoline World Championships

== See also ==
- Scott Fisher (disambiguation)
