= James Fisher =

James Fisher may refer to:

== Politics ==
- James Fisher (physician) (died 1822), Scottish-born physician and politician in Lower Canada
- James Hurtle Fisher (1790–1875), South Australian lawyer, first mayor of Adelaide
- James Fisher (Wisconsin politician) (1816–1901), Wisconsin State Senator, United States
- James Temple Fisher (1828–1905), New Zealand politician
- James Fisher (Manitoba politician) (1840–1927), politician in Manitoba, Canada
- James Bickerton Fisher (1843–1910), New Zealand politician

== Others ==
- James Fisher (Secession minister) (1697–1775), a founder of the Scottish secession church
- J. C. Fisher (James Churchill Fisher, 1826–1891), Australian composer, singing teacher
- James Fisher (footballer) (1876–?), Scottish footballer
- James Fisher (naturalist) (1912–1970), British author and naturalist
- James L. Fisher (1931–2022), American university administrator
- James Fisher (actor) (born 1972), British actor
- J. Richard Fisher (James Richard Fisher, born 1943), scientist at the National Radio Astronomy Observatory
- James Pringle Fisher (1939–2009), Scottish rugby union player
- Jim Fisher (cyclist), Canadian cyclist
- Jimmie Lou Fisher, American politician in Arkansas

== See also ==
- James Fisher Robinson (1800–1882), governor of Kentucky
- James Fisher Trotter (1802–1866), U.S. senator
- James Fisher-Harris (born 1996), New Zealand rugby player
- Jimbo Fisher (John James Fisher), American college football coach
- James Fischer (1927–2004), American engineer
- James Fisher & Sons, UK marine services company
- Robert James Fischer (1943–2008), American chess player better known as Bobby Fischer
