= Les Hauts de Forterre =

- Commune
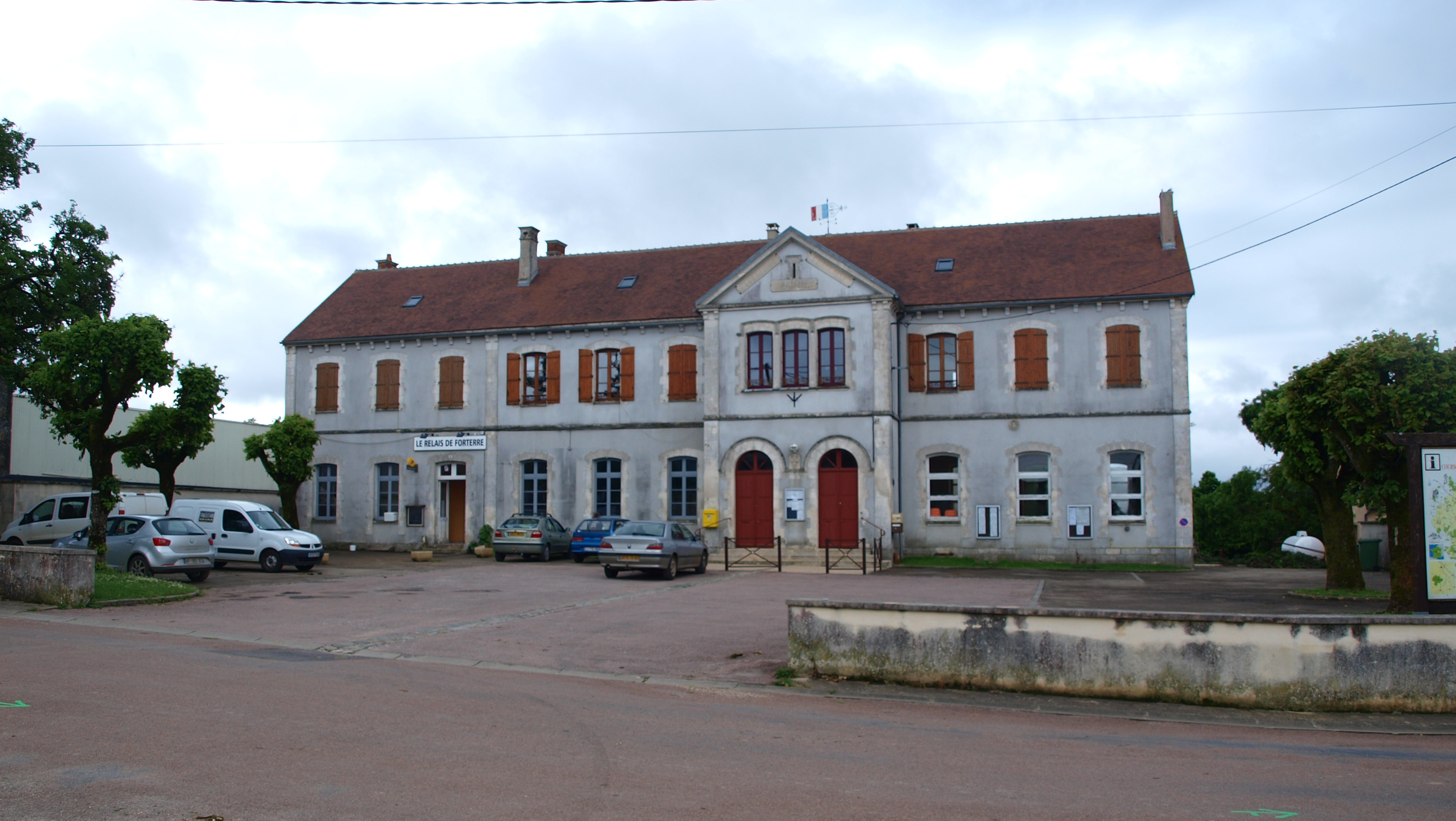
- The town hall in Taingy
- Location of Les Hauts de Forterre
- Location within France Location within Bourgogne-Franche-Comté
- Coordinates: 47°36′58″N 3°24′14″E
- Country: France
- Region: Bourgogne-Franche-Comté
- Department: Yonne
- Arrondissement: Auxerre
- Canton: Vincelles
- Intercommunality: Puisaye-Forterre

Government
  - Mayor (2020–2026): Patrice Renaud
- Area^{1}: 33.07 km^{2} (12.77 sq mi)
- Population (2023): 462
  - Density: 14.0/km^{2} (36.2/sq mi)
- Time zone: UTC+01:00 (CET)
  - Summer (DST): UTC+02:00 (CEST)
- INSEE/Postal code: 89405 /89560
- ^{1} French Land Register data, which excludes lakes, ponds, glaciers > 1 km^{2} (0.386 sq mi or 247 acres) and river estuaries.

Les Hauts de Forterre (French pronunciation: [le o də fɔʁtɛʁ]) is a commune in the department of Yonne, central France, in the natural region of Forterre.

The municipality was established on 1 January 2017 by merger of the former communes of Taingy (the seat), Fontenailles and Molesmes.

== See also ==
- Communes of the Yonne department
