= Karen Fisher =

New Zealand geographer

- Awards: Distinguished Service Award

Academic background
- Education: Australian National University, University of Waikato, University of Waikato

Karen Fisher is a New Zealand human geographer and full professor at the University of Auckland, specialising in freshwater and marine socio-ecological systems.

== Academic career ==
Fisher is Māori and affiliates with the Ngāti Maniapoto and Waikato-Tainui iwi. She completed a Bachelor of Arts and a Master of Social Science at the University of Waikato before moving to Australia to complete a PhD at the Australian National University. Fisher then joined the faculty of the University of Auckland in 2008, rising to full professor in 2024.

Fisher's research focuses on freshwater and marine socio-ecological systems. She is interested in sustainable development and environmental management and has written about the importance of taking a "mountains-to-the-sea" approach to environmental management in New Zealand and why New Zealand should have a Ministry for the Ocean. In 2015, Fisher and collaborator Meg Parsons were awarded a Marsden grant Rethinking the future of freshwater in Aotearoa New Zealand. The research project aimed to understand different cultural approaches to freshwater management and focused on working with Ngāti Maniopoto, local councils, and landowners on the management of the Waipā river.

Fisher is a synthesis strand leader in the Sustainable Seas National Science Challenge. She is also a part of the team, led by Lincoln Agritech, researching the effect of increased carbon dioxide levels on freshwater ecosystems through a $10 million MBIE Endeavour fund grant, Safeguarding Te Mana o te Awa o Waikato from emerging climatic pressures. Fisher is one of the environmental governance experts involved in research on blue carbon legal frameworks led by Elizabeth MacPherson.

== Honours and awards ==
Fisher was awarded the Distinguished Service Medal from the New Zealand Geographical Society in 2022.

== Selected works ==
- Kathryn K. Davies; Fisher, Karen; Dickson, Mark; Thrush, Simon Francis; Le Heron, Richard Bernard (2015). "Improving ecosystem service frameworks to address wicked problems". Ecology and Society. 20 (2). doi:10.5751/es-07581-200237. Wikidata Q60020717.
- Fisher, Karen (2014). "Positionality, subjectivity, and race in transnational and transcultural geographical research". Gender. 22 (4): 456–473. doi:10.1080/0966369x.2013.879097. Wikidata Q64173921.
- Meg Parsons; Fisher, Karen; Johanna Nalau (2016). "Alternative approaches to co-design: insights from indigenous/academic research collaborations". Current Opinion in Environmental Sustainability. 20: 99–105. doi:10.1016/j.cosust.2016.07.001. Wikidata Q58731169.
- Meg Parsons; Johanna Nalau; Fisher, Karen; Cilla Brown (2019). "Disrupting path dependency: Making room for Indigenous knowledge in river management". Global Environmental Change. 56: 95–113. doi:10.1016/j.gloenvcha.2019.03.008. Wikidata Q112606205.
- Meg Parsons; Cilla Brown; Johanna Nalau; Fisher, Karen (2017). "Assessing adaptive capacity and adaptation: insights from Samoan tourism operators". Climate and Development. 10 (7): 644–663. doi:10.1080/17565529.2017.1410082. Wikidata Q58731112.
- Meg Parsons; Johanna Nalau; Fisher, Karen (2017). "Alternative Perspectives on Sustainability: Indigenous Knowledge and Methodologies". Challenges in Sustainability. 5 (1). doi:10.12924/cis2017.05010007. Wikidata Q64170225.
