= Laboratory for Advanced Materials =

The Geballe Laboratory for Advanced Materials (G-LAM) at Stanford University supports research on advanced materials. Major research foci include information storage materials.

G-LAM is an Independent Laboratory that was established on September 1, 1999. Its mission is to support collaborative research programs on advanced materials and foster interdisciplinary research and education for undergraduate, graduate, and postdoctoral students.

Professor Ian R. Fisher was appointed Director of G-LAM in 2013. Fisher heads the Fisher Research Group at G-LAM.

In 2000, the laboratory was named after Stanford physicist Theodore H. Geballe.
