= Richard Fisher =

Richard or Dick Fisher may refer to:

- Richard Fisher Belward (1746–1803), British academic at Cambridge University (born Richard Fisher)
- Richard B. Fisher (1936–2004), American business manager
- Richard L. Fisher (1947–2012), American politician, member of the Virginia House of Delegates
- Richard R. Fisher, American astrophysicist
- Richard Thornton Fisher (1876–1934), American forester and educator
- Richard V. Fisher (1928–2002), American volcanologist
- Richard W. Fisher (born 1949), President and CEO of the Federal Reserve Bank of Dallas
- Dick Fisher (speedway rider) (1933–1986), English speedway rider
- J. Richard Fisher (born 1943), American astronomer
- The Rich Fisher, fictional character Bron in Joseph d'Arimathie verse variant in "Fisher King" literary tradition

== See also ==
- Dick Fisher Airport, Yamhill County, Oregon, USA.
- Richard Fischer (1917–1969), Austrian footballer
