= Fred Fisher (footballer, born April 1910) =

English footballer

Personal information
- Full name: Frederick William Fisher
- Date of birth: 11 April 1910
- Place of birth: Barnsley, England
- Date of death: 26 July 1944 (aged 34)
- Place of death: near Taingy, German-occupied France
- Height: 5 ft 6 in (1.68 m)
- Position: Forward

Senior career*
Years	Team	Apps	(Gls)
1932–1933	Monckton Athletic		
1933–1938	Barnsley	66	(16)
1938	Chesterfield	16	(1)
1938–1944	Millwall	12	(6)

International career
1941	England (wartime)	1	(0)
- * Club domestic league appearances and goals

Frederick William Fisher (11 April 1910 – 26 July 1944) was an English professional football forward who played in the Football League for Barnsley, Chesterfield and Millwall. He won a wartime international cap for England in a 4–1 victory over Wales on 16 April 1941.

== Military service and death ==
Fisher was married and served as an air gunner with the rank of sergeant in the Royal Air Force Volunteer Reserve during the Second World War. On 25 July 1944, Fisher took off from RAF Kirmington in an Avro Lancaster piloted by Flying Officer Bernard Singleton to conduct a raid on Stuttgart, along with another 412 Lancasters and 138 Hailfaxes. Over Yonne, German-occupied France, Fisher's Lancaster was intercepted by a German Junkers Ju 88 night fighter, and it was shot down over Saint-Sauveur-en-Puisaye. The night fighter pilot is thought to have been Oberleutnant Herbert Schulte zur Surlage, who was forced to bail out of his Ju 88 after taking return fire from Fisher's Lancaster. All seven on board, including Fisher, were killed when the plane crashed near Taingy. He was buried in Taingy Communal Cemetery.

== Career statistics ==
Appearances and goals by club, season and competition
Club	Season	League			FA Cup		Total	
Club	Season	Division	Apps	Goals	Apps	Goals	Apps	Goals
Chesterfield	1937–38	Second Division	13	1	0	0	13	1
Chesterfield	1938–39	Second Division	3	0	—		3	0
Chesterfield	Total		16	1	0	0	16	1
Millwall	1938–39	Second Division	12	6	1	0	13	6
Career total			28	7	1	0	29	7
