= Jeff Fischer =

Jeff Fischer may refer to:

- Jeff Fischer (baseball), former pitcher
- Jeff Fischer (actor), American actor
  - Jeff Fischer (American Dad!), the character portrayed by the real Jeff Fischer

== See also ==
- Jeff Fisher (disambiguation)
