= Alan Fisher =

Alan Fisher may refer to:

- Alan Fisher (broadcast journalist), Scottish broadcast journalist
- Alan Fisher (trade unionist) (1922–1988), British trade unionist
- Alan Fisher (architect) (1905–1978), American architect
- Allan George Barnard Fisher (1895–1976), New Zealand born economist
- Alan Fisher (biker), British Hells Angel leader
