= Jeremy Fischer =

Jeremy Fischer may refer to:

- Jeremy Fischer (politician), American attorney and politician from Maine
- Jeremy Fischer (athlete), American track and field athlete and coach

== See also ==
- Jeremy Fisher (disambiguation)
