= Ron Fisher =

Ron Fisher may refer to:

- Ronald Fisher (1890–1962), English statistician, evolutionary biologist, eugenicist and geneticist
- Ron Fisher (politician) (born 1934), Canadian politician
- Ron Fisher (footballer) (1911–1993), Australian rules footballer
- Ron Fisher (tennis) (born 1939), American tennis player
