= Albert Fisher =

Albert Fisher may refer to:

- Albert Fisher (Detroit) (1864–1942), American automobile pioneer
- Albert Fisher (footballer) (1881–1937), English footballer
- Albert Kenrick Fisher (1856–1948), American ornithologist
- Albert J. Fisher (1842–1882), American photographer
- Al Fisher (born 1986), American basketball player
- Albert Fisher, namesake of the historic Albert Fisher Mansion and Carriage House in Utah, United States

== See also ==
- Albert Fish (disambiguation)
