= Alexander Fisher =

Alexander Fisher may refer to:

- Alexander Fisher (cricketer) (1908–1968), Australian cricketer
- Alexander Ingram Fisher (1875–1943), Canadian politician
- Alexander Fisher (MP), English politician
- Alexander Fisher (painter) (1864–1936), English Arts and Crafts enameller
- Alex Fisher (born 1990), English footballer

== See also ==
- Alexander Fischer (born 1986), footballer
- Alexander Fischer (figure skater), early 20th century Russian figure skater
