= Alice Fischer =

Alice Fischer may refer to:

- Alice Fischer (figure skater) (1932–2017), Swiss figure skater and later sprinter
- Alice Fischer (actress) (1869–1947), American actress

== See also ==
- Alice Fisher (disambiguation)
