= Christopher Fisher =

Christopher or Chris Fisher may refer to:

- Christopher T. Fisher (born 1967), American archaeologist
- Chris Fisher (athlete) (Christopher Fisher, born 1949), Australian middle-distance runner
- Chris Fisher (director) (Christopher Lawrence Fisher, born 1971), American director, writer and producer
- Chris Fisher (broadcaster), American play-by-play sports commentator

== See also ==
- Chris Fischer, American chef and farmer
