= Mark Fischer =

Mark Fischer may refer to:

- Mark Fischer (American football) (born 1974), NFL player
- Mark Fischer (attorney) (1950–2015), intellectual property lawyer

== See also ==
- Mark Fisher (disambiguation)
