= Albert Fish (disambiguation) =

Albert Fish (1870–1936) was an American serial killer.

Albert Fish may also refer to:

- Albert Fish (film), a 2007 biographical documentary film about the serial killer
- The Gray Man (2007 film), previously known as Wysteria: The Horrible Story of Albert Fish, a biographical thriller film featuring Patrick Bauchau about Albert's kidnapping and murder of his most popularized victim
- Albert Fish (politician) (1922–2006), Canadian member of parliament

== See also ==
- Albert Fisher (disambiguation)
- Bert Fish, American lawyer, judge, philanthropist, and ambassador
