= Jeremy Fisher (disambiguation) =

Jeremy Fisher is a Canadian singer-songwriter.

Jeremy Fisher may also refer to:

- Jeremy Fisher (author) (born 1954), New Zealand author active in Australia
- Jeremy David Fisher (born 1974), American video producer
- Jeremy Fisher, a character in Salad Fingers, a flash cartoon series by David Firth
- Jeremy Fisher, a character in The Tale of Mr. Jeremy Fisher, a 1906 book by Beatrix Potter

== See also ==
- Jeremy Fischer (disambiguation)
