= Kate Fisher =

Kate Fisher may refer to:

- Big Nose Kate
- Kate Fisher (model)

== See also ==
- Catherine Fisher (disambiguation)
