= Molesmes =

- Part of Les Hauts de Forterre
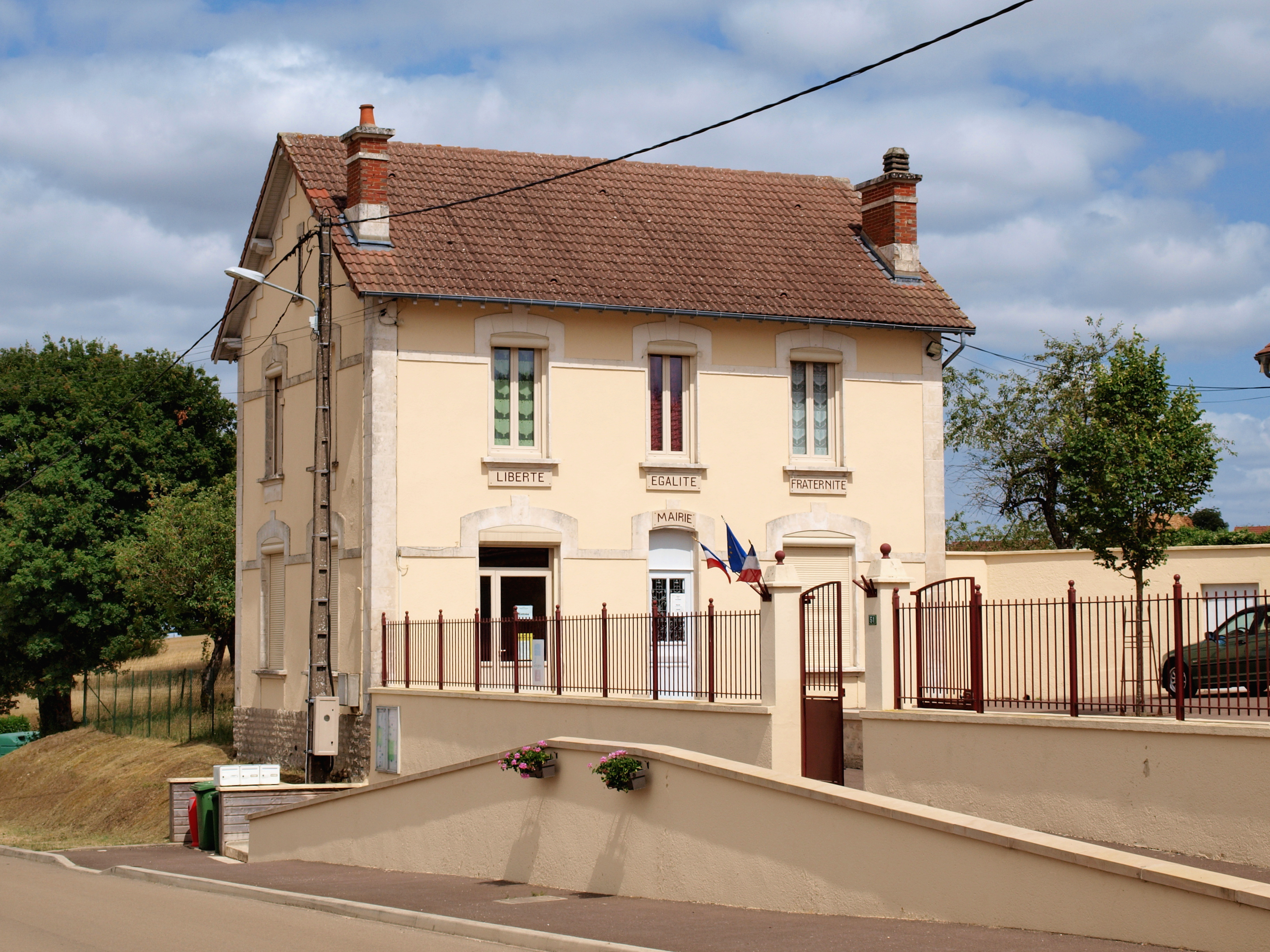
- Town hall
- Location of Molesmes
- Location within France Location within Bourgogne-Franche-Comté
- Coordinates: 47°36′56″N 3°28′01″E
- Country: France
- Region: Bourgogne-Franche-Comté
- Department: Yonne
- Arrondissement: Auxerre
- Canton: Vincelles
- Commune: Les Hauts de Forterre
- Area^{1}: 9.50 km^{2} (3.67 sq mi)
- Highest elevation: 367 m (1,204 ft)
- Lowest elevation: 244 m (801 ft)
- Population (2022): 165
  - Density: 17.4/km^{2} (45.0/sq mi)
- Time zone: UTC+01:00 (CET)
  - Summer (DST): UTC+02:00 (CEST)
- Postal code: 89560
- ^{1} French Land Register data, which excludes lakes, ponds, glaciers > 1 km^{2} (0.386 sq mi or 247 acres) and river estuaries.

Molesmes (French pronunciation: [mɔlɛm]) is a former commune in the Yonne department in Bourgogne-Franche-Comté in north-central France. On 1 January 2017, it was merged into the new commune Les Hauts de Forterre.

== See also ==
- Communes of the Yonne department
