= Ian Fisher =

Ian Fisher may refer to:

- Ian Fisher (English cricketer) (born 1976), English cricketer
- Ian Fisher (New Zealand cricketer) (born 1961), New Zealand cricketer
- Ian Fisher (journalist) (born 1965), American journalist
- Ian Fisher (physicist), British physicist
