= Anthony Fisher (disambiguation) =

Anthony Fisher is the ninth Archbishop of Sydney, the former Bishop of Parramatta, and a bioethicist.

Anthony or Antony Fisher may also refer to:

- Antony Fisher (1915–1988), British businessman
- Anthony Clinton Fisher, American environmental economist
- Anthony Corey Fisher (born 1988), American-born Georgian professional basketball player
- Anthony Fisher (basketball, born 1986), American professional basketball player
- Anthony Fisher (basketball, born 1994), Australian professional basketball player
- Anthony Fisher (Massachusetts politician), member of the Great and General Court

== See also ==
- Tony Fisher (disambiguation)
- Anthony Fischer, Swiss musician with Pfuri Gorps & Kniri
- Anthony Charles-Fisher, a character in Six Feet Under
