= Joel Fisher =

Joel Fisher may refer to:

- Joel H. Fisher, Lieutenant Commander of the US Coast Guard
- Joel Fisher, musician in Kids in Glass Houses
- Joel Fisher (artist) on List of Guggenheim Fellowships awarded in 1993
