= Steven Fisher =

Steven Fisher may refer to:

- Steven W. Fisher (1946–2010), American attorney who served on the New York Supreme Court, Appellate Division
- Steven Fisher, better known as Fisher Stevens (born 1963), American Actor.

== See also ==
- Steve Fisher (disambiguation)
