= Mark Fisher (disambiguation) =

Mark Fisher (1968–2017) was an English writer and cultural theorist.

Mark Fisher may also refer to:

- Mark Fisher (architect) (1947–2013), British music stage architect
- Mark Fisher (musician) (1959–2016), British keyboardist
- Mark Fisher (British politician) (1944–2025), British politician
- Mark Fisher (songwriter) (1895–1948), American lyricist
- Mark Fisher (civil servant) (born 1960), British civil servant
- Mark Fisher (soccer) (born 2000), Canadian association footballer
- Mark N. Fisher (born 1962), American politician
- Mark S. Fisher, American student killed in 2003

== See also ==
- Marc Fisher (born 1958), American journalist
- Mark Fischer (disambiguation)
- Mark Fisher Fitness, boutique gymnasium
- Fisher (surname)
