= Justin Fisher =

Justin Fisher may refer to:

- Justin Fisher (musician), American bass player
- Justin Fisher (soldier), former Army Specialist and co-conspirator in the murder of PFC Barry Winchell
