= Philip Fisher =

Philip Fisher may refer to:

- Philip Fisher (1596–1652), a.k.a. Thomas Copley, English religious leader
- Philip Arthur Fisher (1907–2004), American entrepreneur, investor & author
- Philip Edward Fisher (born 1979), British classical pianist
- Philip Fisher (author) (born 1941), author and academic in English literature at Harvard University
- Philip "Fish", Fisher (fl. c. 1980), American musician, former member of Fishbone
- Philip Fisher (died 1776), Bristol architect who designed Shire Hall, Monmouth
