= Samuel Fisher =

Samuel Fisher may refer to:

- Samuel Fisher (Quaker) (1605–1665), English Quaker controversialist
- Samuel Fisher (died 1681) (c. 1605–1681), English ejected minister
- Samuel Fisher (clergyman) (1777–1857), American clergyman and educator
- Samuel Melton Fisher (1859–1939), English artist
- Samuel Rhoads Fisher (1794–1839), secretary of the Navy of the Republic of Texas
- Samuel Rowland Fisher (1745–1834), Philadelphia merchant in Revolutionary times
- Samuel Fisher, Baron Fisher of Camden (1905–1979), British businessman and Jewish leader
- Samuel H. Fisher (1867–1957), American attorney and print historian

== See also ==
- Samuel von Fischer (1859–1934), Hungarian-born German publisher
- Sam Fisher (disambiguation)
