= Sam Fisher =

Sam Fisher may refer to:

- Sam Fisher (Australian footballer) (born 1982), former Australian rules footballer
- Sam Fisher (Scottish footballer) (born 2001), Scottish association footballer
- Sam Fisher (cyclist), Welsh cyclist
- Sam Fisher (Splinter Cell), protagonist of Ubisoft's Splinter Cell video game series

== See also ==
- Samuel Fisher (disambiguation)
- Sam Fischer (born 1991), Australian singer, songwriter, and musician
- Samantha Fisher (born 1995), Canadian curler
- Samantha Fisher (footballer)
