= Christopher T. Fisher =

American archaeologist

Christopher T. Fisher (born 1967) is an American archaeologist.

== Early days ==
Fisher grew up in Duluth and Spokane and is a first generation college student.

== Education ==
Fisher began his academic studies as a percussion-performance major at Eastern Washington University. However, after going on an archaeology field-school, he changed his major to anthropology, getting a B.A. in anthropology from Michigan State University. Thereupon, he got an M.A. and a Ph.D. at the University of Wisconsin-Madison.

== Professional activities ==
Fisher is the founder and co-director of the Earth Archive as well as Professor of Anthropology at Colorado State University and a National Geographic Explorer. His specialities include LiDAR and aspects of urban development and environmental change in Meso-America. In particular, he has done extensive research on the Tarascan Empire in Michoacan, Mexico.

Fisher led a project to map the major Purépecha (Tarascan) city of Angamuco in Mexico. Fisher's use of LiDAR at the site of is possibly its first archaeological application in Mesoamerica. "The images gathered after flying over Angamuco for just forty-five minutes revealed twenty thousand previously unknown archeological features, including a pyramid that, seen from overhead, is shaped like a keyhole."

Fisher established the Earth Archive to map all of the Earth's terrain using laser technology on aircraft (LiDAR). The project was inspired by the threat of climate change to cultural heritage and the use of laser scanning to record archaeological sites by CyArk.

Fisher was also the lead archaeologist and scientific director of the Mosquitia Archaeological Project (MAP) through which the World Heritage Site, the City of the Jaguar, also known as Ciudad Blanca was first documented using Airborne LiDAR. Fisher also led excavations at the ancient city in 2016 sponsored by National Geographic and the Honduran Government.

== Honors ==
- Gordon R. Willey Prize (American Anthropological Association) in 2007 for "the best archaeology paper published in the American Anthropologist over a period of three years".

== Publications ==
- Fisher, Christopher T., et al., eds. (2022) The Archaeology of Environmental Change: Socionatural Legacies of Degradation and Resilience. University of Arizona Press.
- Thurston, Tina L. and Christopher T. Fisher, eds. (2007) Seeking a Richer Harvest: An Introduction to the Archaeology of Subsistence Intensification, Innovation, and Change. Springer.
- Fisher, Christopher T. (2005) "Demographic and Landscape Change in the Lake Patzcuaro Basin, Mexico: Abandoning the Garden,"American Anthropologist 107(1): 87-95.
