= Alice Fisher =

Alice Fisher may refer to:

- Alice Fisher (nurse) (1839–1888), nursing pioneer
- Alice S. Fisher (born 1967), assistant Attorney General in the United States Department of Justice

== See also ==
- Alice Fischer (disambiguation)
