= Hugo Anton Fisher =

Czech-American painter

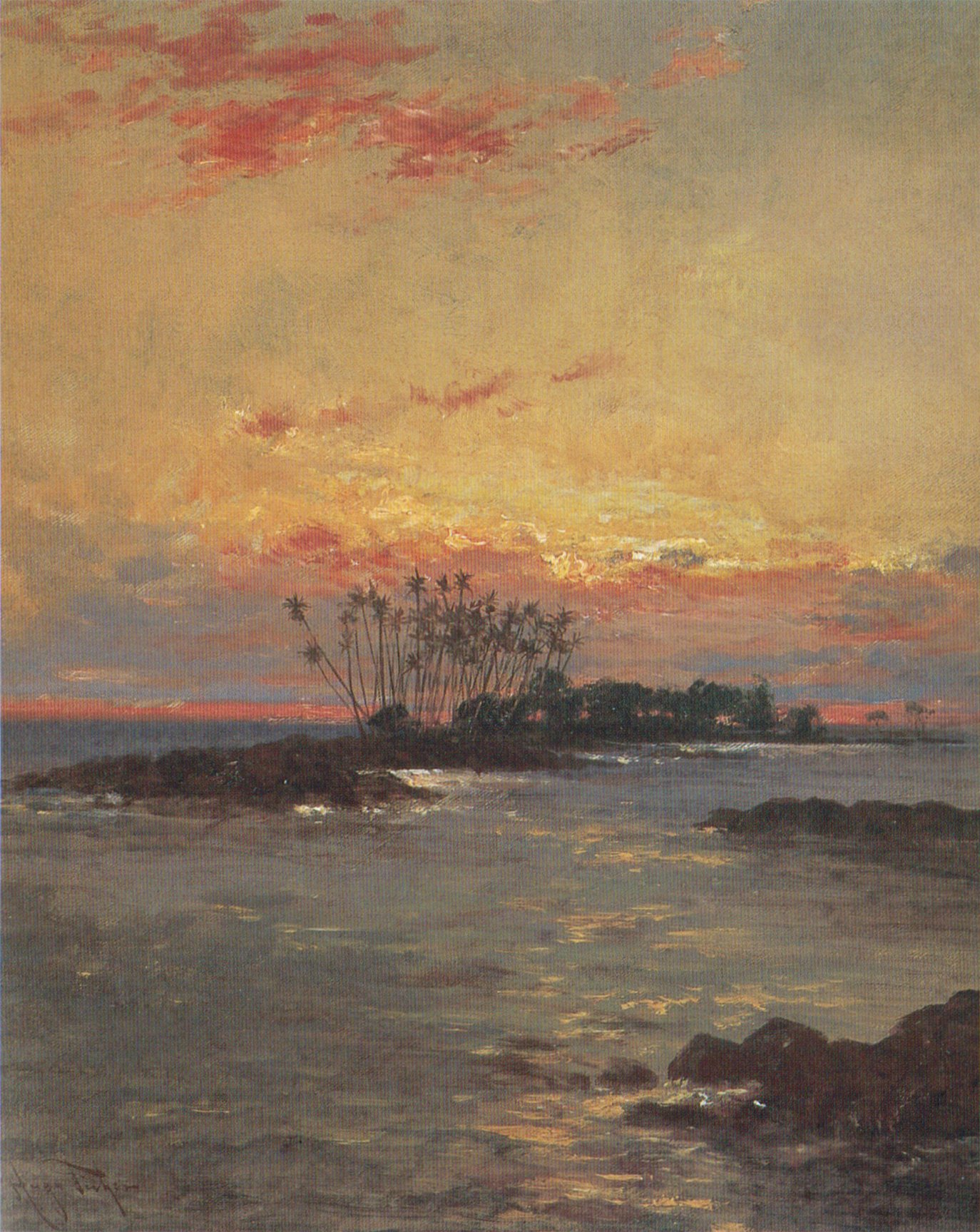
Sunrise, Hilo Bay, oil on canvas painting by Hugo Anton Fisher, 1896

Hugo Anton Fisher (1854 – November 27, 1916) was a Czech-American artist primarily known for painting landscapes in watercolor. He was active in Northern California and Hawaii.

== Biography ==
Hugo Anton Fisher was born in 1854, into a family of artists in Kladno, Bohemia, Austrian Empire. In 1874, he immigrated to New York, and in 1886, he moved to Alameda, California with his wife and children. About 1894, Fisher moved to Hawaii and opened a studio in Honolulu, but he left Hawaii for the mainland late in 1896. Fisher died in Alameda, California in 1916.

One of Fisher's children, Hugo Melville Fisher (1878–1946), was a California-based impressionist painter. The Adirondack Museum (Blue Mountain Lake, New York), the Fine Arts Museums of San Francisco, the Hawaii State Art Museum, the Jersey City Museum (Jersey City, New Jersey), the Oakland Museum of California, and Thiel College (Greenville, Pennsylvania) are among the public collections holding work by Hugo Anton Fisher.

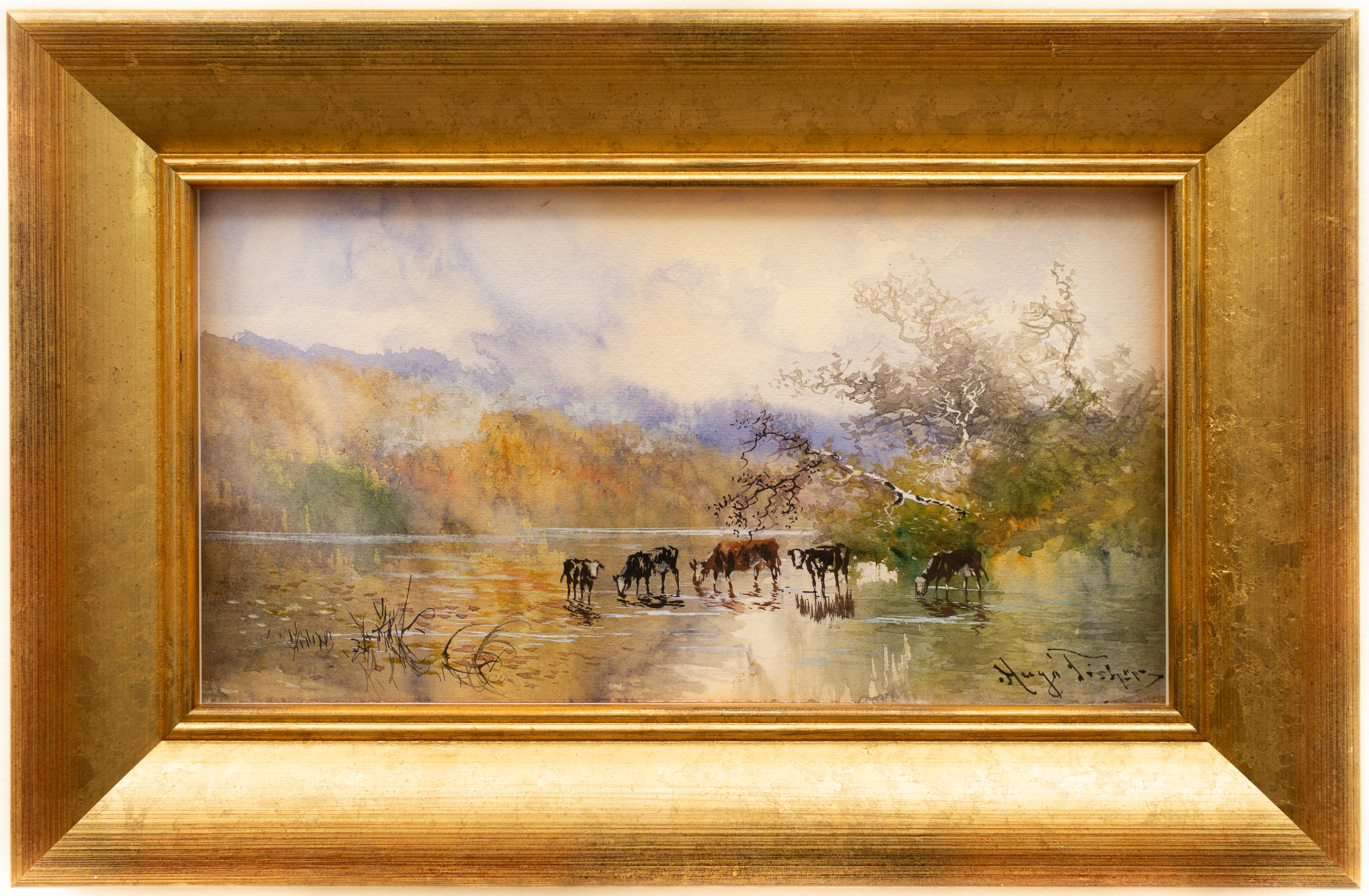
Landscape View With Cows Drinking Water, Classicartworks Stockholm collection
