= Ian Fisher (physicist) =

Physicist

Ian Randal Fisher is a United States-based British physicist and Director of the Geballe Laboratory for Advanced Materials at Stanford University.

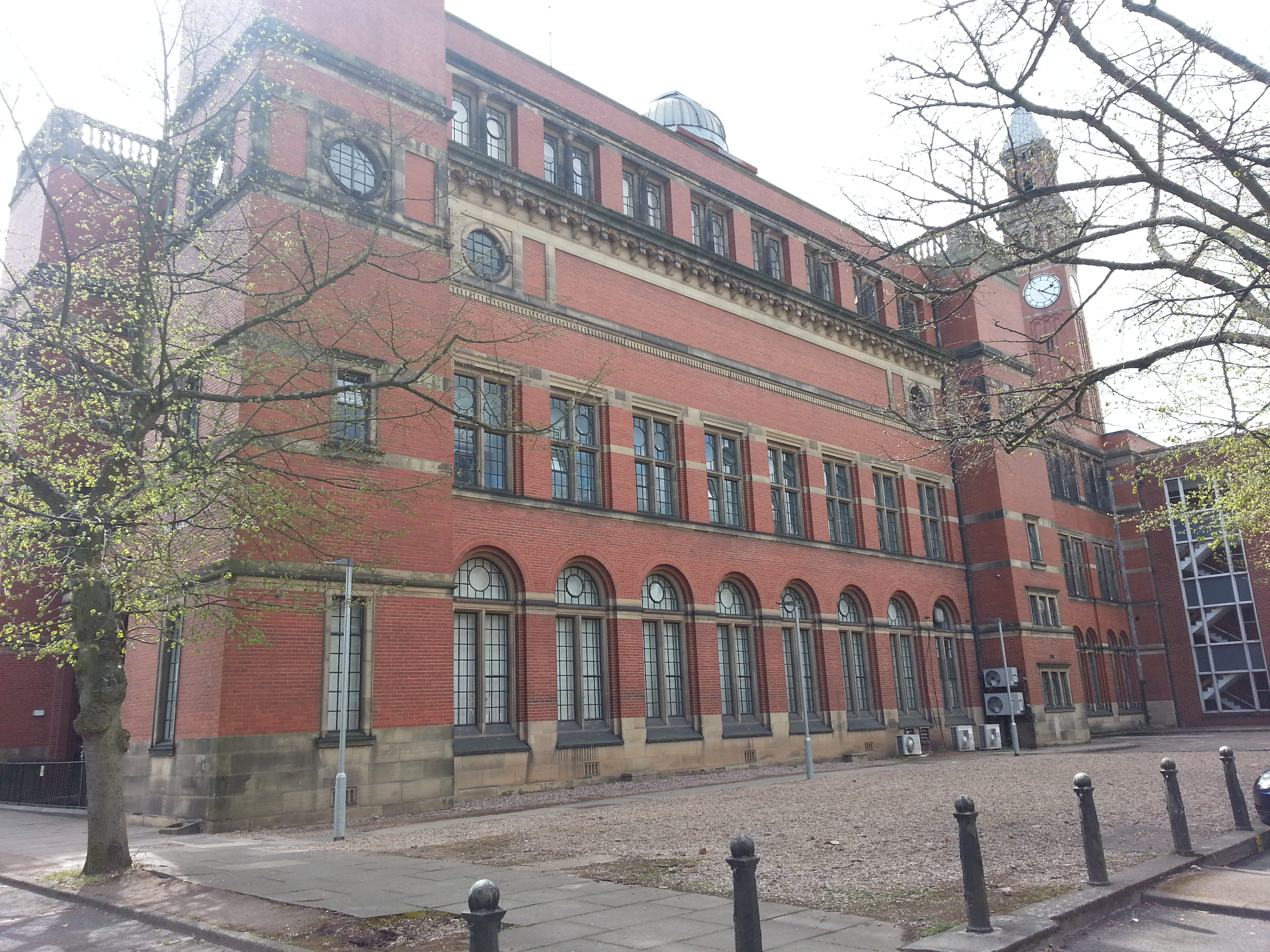
Birmingham University

Ian R. Fisher was born and educated in the United Kingdom. He did his undergraduate study at the School of Physics and Space Research at the University of Birmingham in England from 1989 to 1992. He graduated with a BSc in physics from Birmingham University in 1993. He was a research assistant at the New Zealand Institute for Industrial Research, in Lower Hutt, New Zealand, in 1993. He did his PhD at the University of Cambridge, in England from 1993 to 1996.

Fisher was appointed Director of the Geballe Laboratory for Advanced Materials at Stanford University, in the United States in 2013. He was also appointed Professor of Applied Physics at Stanford University in 2013. He heads the Fisher Research Group at the Geballe Laboratory.

Ian Fisher receives funding from the United States Department of Energy (DOE) to support his research in the synthesis and physical properties of exotic new materials.

Fisher was elected a Fellow of the American Physical Society in 2014. He received the Dean's award for Distinguished Teaching in 2004.
