= Susan Fisher =

Susan Fisher may refer to:

- Susan C. Fisher, Democratic member of the North Carolina General Assembly
- Susan Audé Fisher, American news TV anchor

== See also ==
- Susan Fisher-Hoch, British-born infectious disease specialist
- Susan Fischer, Orange Is the New Black character
