= Frederick Thomas Fisher =

- Navy Medal of Honor
- Born: June 3, 1872; England
- Died: April 15, 1906 (aged 33); Guantánamo Bay Naval Base, Cuba
- Burial place: Angelus-Rosedale Cemetery; Los Angeles, California
- Military career
- Allegiance: United States of America
- Branch: United States Navy
- Service years: 1893 to 1906
- Rank: Gunner's Mate First Class
- Units: USS Philadelphia; USS Kearsarge (BB-5); USS Wyoming (BM-10); USS Monterey (BM-6); USS Oregon (BB-3)
- Conflicts: Second Samoan Civil War
- Awards: Medal of Honor

Frederick Thomas Fisher (June 3, 1872 – April 15, 1906) was a gunner's mate in the United States Navy aboard USS Philadelphia (C-4) in 1899 during the Second Samoan Civil War. He received the Medal of Honor for his actions as part of the naval landing party during the Second Battle of Vailele on April 1, 1899.

== Biography ==
Fisher was born June 3, 1872, in England and after immigrating to the United States he joined the U.S. Navy. During the Second Samoan Civil War. he was assigned as a gunner's mate first class to the USS Philadelphia (C-4).

The authority for the award of the Medal of Honor was United States Navy General Order No. 55, July 19, 1901.

== Medal of Honor citation ==
Rank and organization: Gunner's Mate First Class, U.S. Navy. Born: June 3, 1872, England. Accredited to: California. G.O. No.: 55, July 19, 1901.

Fisher's's official Medal of Honor citation reads:

Gunner's mate, first class, serving on board the U.S.S.Philadelphia, for distinguished conduct in the presence of the enemy at Samoa, April 1, 1899.

== Death and burial ==
Fisher died on April 15, 1906, while serving aboard the USS Kearsarge (BB-5) and was initially interred at Guantánamo Bay Naval Base, Cuba. Fisher's body was reinterred on November 17, 1906 in Angelus-Rosedale Cemetery, Los Angeles, California in Section K, Lot 84, Grave NE.

Fisher's reinterment notice in the November 19, 1906 Los Angeles, CA Times newspaper read:

BRAVE SAILOR AT REST. The remains of Frederick T. Fisher, chief gunner's mate of the United States warship Kearsarge, who was killed in the explosion on that vessel eight months ago, have been brought to Los Angeles, and were interred in Rosedale Cemetery on Saturday afternoon. The funeral services were private. His widow. Mrs. Inez M. Fisher, is residing at No. 1026 Temple street.

== See also ==
- List of Medal of Honor recipients
