= Reginald Fisher =

Reginald Fisher may refer to:

- Reginald Fisher (cricketer) (1872–1939), English cricketer
- Reginald Brettauer Fisher (1907–1986), British biochemist
- Reg Fisher (1901–1958), Australian politician
- Reg Fisher (footballer) (1932–2011), Australian rules footballer
- Michael Fisher (Anglican bishop) (Reginald Lindsay Fisher, 1918–2003), Anglican bishop of St Germans
