= Stan Fisher =

Australian rules footballer

Personal information
- Full name: Stanley Robert Henry Fisher
- Born: 4 February 1911; Warburton, Victoria
- Died: 16 March 1961 (aged 50); South Melbourne, Victoria
- Original team: Warburton

Playing career^{1}
Years	Club	Games (Goals)
1931–1932	Hawthorn	20 (1)
- ^{1} Playing statistics correct to the end of 1932.

Stanley Robert Henry Fisher (4 February 1911 – 16 March 1961) was an Australian rules footballer who played with Hawthorn in the Victorian Football League (VFL).
