= Rick Fisher =

Rick Fisher may refer to:

- Rick Fisher (lighting designer), American lighting designer
- Rick Fisher (basketball) (1948–2019), American basketball player
- Rick Fisher (tennis) (born 1951), American tennis player
