= Elizabeth Macpherson =

New Zealand law academic specialising in Indigenous water rights

- Known for: Comparative research on Indigenous water rights
- Awards: Rutherford Discovery Fellowship (2023); Royal Society Te Apārangi Early-Career Research Award (2021)

Academic background
- Education: Victoria University of Wellington; University of Melbourne

Academic work
- Discipline: environmental and natural-resources law
- Institutions: University of Canterbury

Elizabeth Jane Macpherson is a New Zealand legal scholar whose work examines how national legal systems recognise and regulate Indigenous peoples’ rights to water. She is a professor of law at the University of Canterbury and, since 2023, a Rutherford Discovery Fellow investigating blue-carbon governance.

== Early life and education ==
Macpherson is of Pākehā descent and grew up in Aotearoa New Zealand. She completed a BA(Hons) and an LLB at Victoria University of Wellington, then moved to Australia for doctoral study. Her 2014 PhD at the Melbourne Law School compared water-rights settlements in Australasia and Latin America, laying the groundwork for her later monograph.

== Academic career ==
Appointed to the University of Canterbury in 2014, Macpherson progressed rapidly through the ranks and was promoted to full professor in 2024. Her research sits at the intersection of environmental law, human rights and comparative public law. As a principal investigator in the Sustainable Seas National Science Challenge she studies how ecosystem-based marine management can avoid “maladaptation” in climate policy.

Macpherson's book Indigenous Water Rights in Law and Regulation: Lessons from Comparative Experience (Cambridge University Press, 2019) is described by reviewers as the first systematic survey of legal mechanisms that protect Indigenous control over freshwater around the world. Courts, royal commissions and parliamentary inquiries in both hemispheres have cited the study, and it won the 2020 Law and Society Association of Australia and New Zealand prize for most outstanding book.

== Honours ==
- Royal Society Te Apārangi Early-Career Researcher Award (2021) for opening “new pathways for Indigenous peoples’ water rights in law”.
- Rutherford Discovery Fellowship (2023–2028), supporting her work on blue-carbon governance.
- University of Canterbury Advancing Sustainability Research Award (2023).

== Selected works ==
- Macpherson, Elizabeth (20 July 2019), Indigenous Water Rights in Law and Regulation, Cambridge University Press, doi:10.1017/9781108611091, Wikidata Q123709585
- Macpherson, Elizabeth; Felipe Clavijo Ospina (2020). "The pluralism of river rights in Aotearoa, New Zealand and Colombia". OSF Preprints. doi:10.31235/osf.io/rdh4x. Wikidata Q123709576.
- O'Donnell, Erin; Macpherson, Elizabeth (2018). "Voice, power and legitimacy: the role of the legal person in river management in New Zealand, Chile and Australia". Australian Journal of Water Resources. 23 (1): 35–44. doi:10.1080/13241583.2018.1552545. Wikidata Q123709586.
