= Roger Fisher =

Roger Fisher may refer to:

- Roger Fisher (academic) (1922–2012), American professor of law at Harvard
- Roger Fisher (organist), British organist and pianist
- Roger Fisher (guitarist) (born 1950), American guitarist with Heart
