= Red Fisher =

Red Fisher may refer to:

- Red Fisher (baseball) (1887–1940), former Major League Baseball player
- Red Fisher (journalist) (1926–2018), Canadian sports columnist for the Montreal Star and Montreal Gazette
- Red Fisher (sportsman) (1914–2006), former sporting goods retailer and Canadian television personality
- Dwight "Red" Fisher (1912–1991), head football coach at Alcorn A&M College
