= Paul Fisher =

Paul Fisher may refer to:

- Paul A. Fisher (1921–2007), American author and journalist
- Paul Fisher (cricketer, born 1954) (born 1954), English cricketer and educationalist
- Paul Fisher (cricketer, born 1977) (born 1977), English cricketer
- Paul C. Fisher (1913–2006), American industrialist and inventor of the Fisher Space Pen
- Paul Fisher (fictional), a fictional character in the book Tangerine
- Paul Fisher (economist) (born 1958), member of the Bank of England's Monetary Policy Committee
- Paul Fisher (footballer) (born 1951), English footballer
- Paul Fisher (sailor) (born 1962), Bermudian Olympic sailor
- Paul Nicholas Fisher (born 1985), Australian music producer, known professionally by his mononym as Fisher
