= Brian Fisher =

Brian or Bryan Fisher may refer to:

- Brian Fisher (entomologist), entomologist specializing in ants
- Brian Fisher (baseball) (born 1962), Major League Baseball pitcher
- Bryan Fisher (born 1980), actor

== See also ==
- Brian Fischer, American prison officer
- Bryan Fischer (born 1951), U.S. sociopolitical commentator
