= Mary A. Fisher =

British-born American novelist (1839-1920)

- Born: 1839; Hampstead
- Died: June 22, 1920 (aged 80–81); Tenafly
- Occupation: Writer

Mary Ann Fisher (1839 – June 22, 1920) was a British-born American novelist.

Mary A. Fisher was born in 1839 in Hampstead, England. Her family moved to Brooklyn when she was a child.

In her novel Louisa Forrester (1905), a woman becomes engaged to a celibate minister. Her Among the Immortals, in the Land of Desire (1916) is a utopian novel where the inhabitants of an afterlife use telescopes to watch the horrors of World War I on Earth.

Fisher founded the Home-Hotel Association in 1888 to assist destitute writers, artists, actors, and other professionals. Originally headquartered in the Bronx, the Fisher Home for Aged and Poor Professional People moved to Tenafly, New Jersey.

Mary A. Fisher died on June 22, 1920 in Tenafly, New Jersey.

== Bibliography ==
- Louisa Forrester. New York, [Printed by J.J. Little & co.], 1905.
- Young Doctor Hamilton. New York, Cochrane Pub. Co., 1908.
- The ghost in the garret, and other stories. New York, Aberdeen Pub. Co., [1910].
- Young Mrs. Morton: A Novel. New York: Cochrane, 1911.
- The Story of the Mary Fisher Home (1915).
- Among the Immortals, in the Land of Desire: A Glimpse of the Beyond (New York: The Shakespeare Press, 1916)
