= Jeremy David Fisher =

- Born: June 12, 1974; 51 years ago Detroit, Michigan, United States
- Awards: Emmy Award – WFOR Suncoast Chapter; 2003 Run Ricky Run – Editing; Emmy Award – WFOR Suncoast Chapter; 2005 Living Beyond Breast Cancer – Series; Emmy Award – WFOR, Suncoast Chapter; 2005 School Insecurity – Series

Jeremy David Fisher (born June 12, 1974, in Detroit, Michigan) is an American Video Producer and Final Cut Editor.

His activities encompass several areas of stop motion and creative design, including: concept design, track reading, fabrication, 3D printing, rigging, animation, editing, and compositing. He has more than 8 years in the entertainment industry.

Fisher won the NATAS Suncoast Emmy Award for Best Sports Editing for 2003's Run Ricky Run and 2005's Emmy Award for Best Series for Living Beyond Breast Cancer and School Insecurity with WFOR-TV in Miami.
