= Douglas Fisher =

Douglas or Doug Fisher may refer to:

== Politics ==
- Douglas Glenn Fisher (born 1942), Canadian politician and farmer
- Douglas H. Fisher (born 1947), American politician
- Doug Fisher (politician) (1919–2009), Canadian politician and columnist

== Others ==
- Douglas Fisher (Royal Navy officer) (1890–1963), British sailor and Fourth Sea Lord
- Douglas Fisher (born 1934), American actor, in Imagination Movers
- Douglas John Fisher, American bishop
- Doug Fisher (actor) (1941–2000), British actor
- Doug Fisher (American football) (1947–2023), American football player
