= Evelyn Fisher =

American politician (died 2002)

Member of the Connecticut House of Representatives from Oxford
- In office 1959–1963
- Preceded by: C. Arthur Maybury Jr.
- Succeeded by: David T. Schreiber

Personal details
- Born: 1923 or 1924
- Died: June 3, 2002 (aged 78)
- Party: Democratic
- Spouse: Bruce R. Fisher Jr.
- Children: 3

Evelyn S. Fisher (1923 or 1924 – June 3, 2002) was an American politician who served in the Connecticut House of Representatives from 1959 to 1963, representing the town of Oxford as a Democrat.
