= Fontenailles, Yonne =

Fontenailles
- Part of Les Hauts de Forterre
- Location of Fontenailles
- Location within France Location within Bourgogne-Franche-Comté
- Coordinates: 47°37′57″N 3°28′01″E
- Country: France
- Region: Bourgogne-Franche-Comté
- Department: Yonne
- Arrondissement: Auxerre
- Canton: Vincelles
- Commune: Les Hauts de Forterre
- Area^{1}: 2.76 km^{2} (1.07 sq mi)
- Highest elevation: 346 m (1,135 ft)
- Lowest elevation: 243 m (797 ft)
- Population (2022): 70
  - Density: 25/km^{2} (66/sq mi)
- Time zone: UTC+01:00 (CET)
  - Summer (DST): UTC+02:00 (CEST)
- Postal code: 89560
- ^{1} French Land Register data, which excludes lakes, ponds, glaciers > 1 km^{2} (0.386 sq mi or 247 acres) and river estuaries.

Fontenailles (French pronunciation: [fɔ̃tnaj]) is a former commune in the Yonne department in Bourgogne-Franche-Comté in north-central France. On 1 January 2017, it was merged into the new commune Les Hauts de Forterre.

== See also ==
- Communes of the Yonne department
