= Clement Fisher (16th century MP) =

English Member of Parliament

Clement Fisher (c. 1539 – 23 October 1619), of Great Packington, Warwickshire, was an English Member of Parliament.

In 1584, he represented Tamworth.
