= Noel Fisher (disambiguation) =

Noel Fisher (born 1984) is a Canadian actor.

Noel Fisher may also refer to:

- Detail (record producer) (real name Noel Fisher), American record producer and recording artist
- Noel Fisher (footballer) (1912–1985), Australian rules footballer
