= Jeff Fisher (disambiguation) =

Jeff Fisher is an American football player and coach.

Jeff(rey) or Geoff(rey) Fisher may also refer to:

- Jeff Fisher (composer), Canadian composer and musician
- Jeff W. Fisher, suffragan bishop of the Episcopal Diocese of Texas
- Jeffrey L. Fisher (born 1970), American law professor
- Geoffrey Fisher (1887–1972), archbishop
- Jeff Fisher (rugby league) in 1981 Eastern Suburbs Roosters season
- Jeff Fisher (author) (born 1960), American author

== See also ==
- Jeff Fischer (disambiguation)
