= Scott Fisher =

Scott Fisher may refer to:

- Scott Fisher (basketball) (born 1963), retired American-Australian basketball player and former head coach
- Scott Fisher (technologist), professor at the University of Southern California
- Scott R. Fisher, visual effects artist.

== See also ==
- Scott Fischer (disambiguation)
