= University Missourian =

- Type: Daily newspaper
- School: University of Missouri
- Launched: September 14, 1908; 117 years ago
- Ceased publication: 1916
- City: Columbia, Missouri
- ISSN: 2151-531X

The University Missourian newspaper ran from 1908 to 1916. This newspaper started the same year the University of Missouri School of Journalism opened. The University Missourian provided practical experience for writing articles for journalism students at the university. This would eventually become the Missourian newspaper as it is printed today.

== Background ==
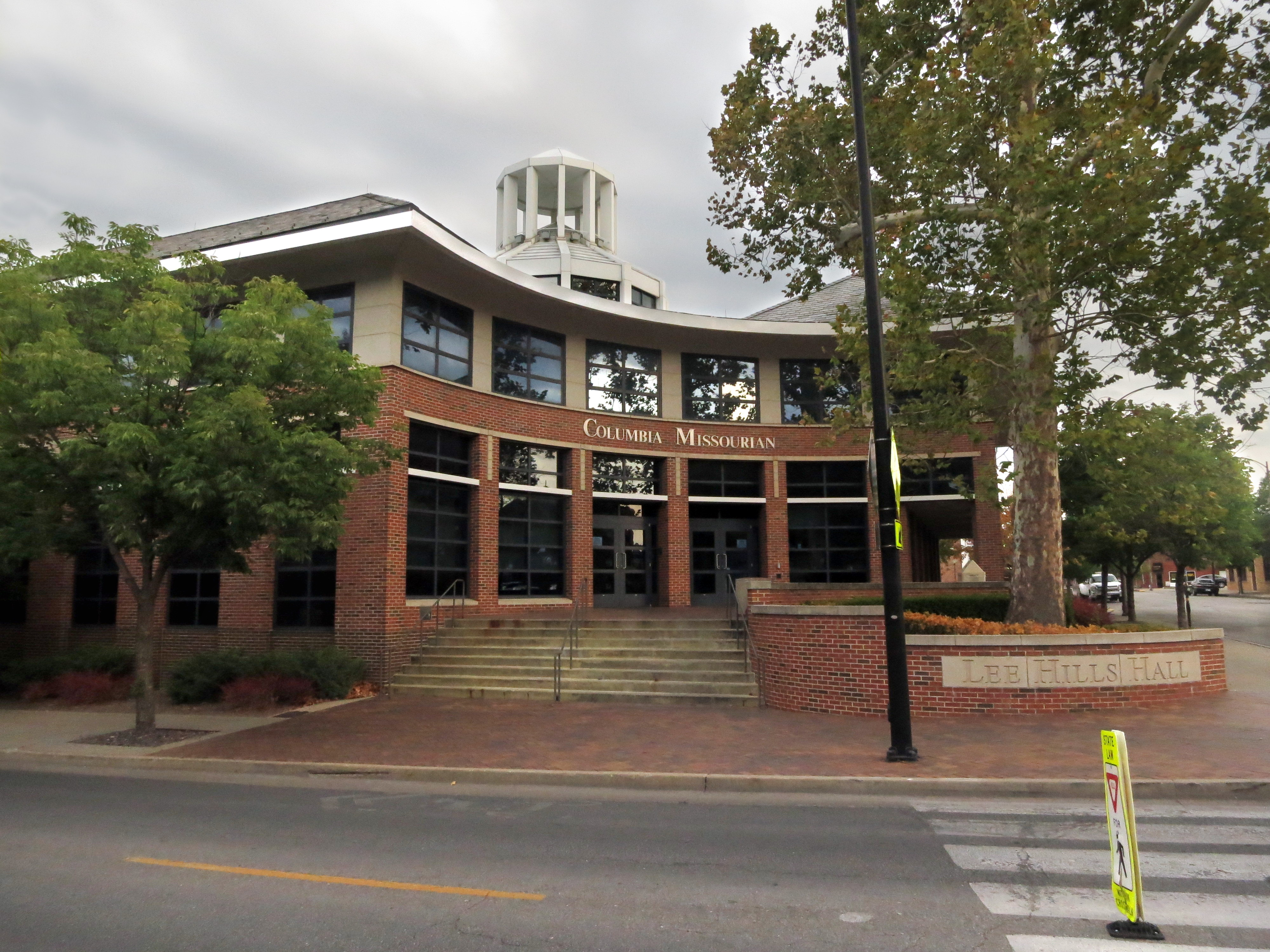
The Columbia Missourian headquarters.

The University Missourian was started September 14, 1908, which was the same day classes started at the University of Missouri School of Journalism. The School of Journalism hired three experienced newsmen and faculty: Walter Williams, editor of the Columbia Herald; Silas Bent, from the staff of the St. Louis Post-Dispatch; and Charles G. Ross, from the St. Louis Republic. According to Dean Williams, the Missourian provided practical experience to journalism students, as the paper afforded "a laboratory course in actual newspaper making." Throughout its early years, faculty members served as editors of the Missourian, assigning stories to students. During the early years, the paper suspended publication during summers and university holidays, reflecting its dependence on its student workers. The Missourian continues in print today, and produces a Web version as well (http://www.columbiamissourian.com/). Its emphasis on University students and on campus life has broadened, offering full service as a community paper in Columbia, Boone County, and mid-Missouri.
