= Hugh Fisher =

Hugh Fisher may refer to:

- Hugh Fisher (footballer) (born 1944), Scottish football player and manager
- Hugh Fisher (canoeist) (born 1955), New Zealand-born Canadian Olympic medal-winning canoeist
