= Robin Fisher =

Robin Fisher may refer to:

- Robin Fisher (historian)
- Robin Fisher (cricketer)
