= Rebecca Fisher =

Rebecca Fisher may refer to:

== People ==
- Becky Fisher Miss Texas Teen USA
- Becky Fischer, American Pentecostal children's pastor
- Rebecca Fisher (soccer), see Fredericksburg Impact
- Rebecca Jane G. Fisher (1831–1926), American philanthropist and preservationist

== Fictional characters ==
- Rebecca Fisher, character in Doctors, played by Angela McHale
- Rebecca Nash, née Fisher, Home and Away character
- Becca Fisher, character in Flash Forward
