= Clem Fisher =

Australian rules footballer (1908–1988)

Personal information
- Full name: Thomas Clement Fisher
- Born: 3 February 1908; South Melbourne, Victoria
- Died: 13 April 1988 (aged 80); Mount Waverley, Victoria

Playing career^{1}
Years	Club	Games (Goals)
1929–1930	Port Melbourne (VFA)	28 (10)
1931–1932	South Melbourne (VFL)	14 (4)
1932	St Kilda (VFL)	9 (4)
Total		51 (18)
- ^{1} Playing statistics correct to the end of 1932.

Thomas Clement Fisher (3 February 1908 – 13 April 1988) was an Australian rules footballer who played with South Melbourne and St Kilda in the Victorian Football League (VFL).

== Family ==
The son of Thomas Fisher (1885–1964), and May Fisher (1887–1967), née Mardell, Thomas Clement Fisher was born at South Melbourne, Victoria on 3 February 1908.

He was the older brother of St Kilda footballer Ron Fisher.

He married Thelma Tudor Riley (1911–2008), at Albert Park, Victoria, on 29 November 1934.

== Football ==
In March 1929, "C. Fisher, 6 ft., 12 st, 7 lbs. Follower and half-back South Melbourne church team" was one of those training with South Melbourne in the VFL pre-season.

=== Port Melbourne (VFA) ===
Identified as "T. Fisher" he played 28 games, and scored 10 goals for Port Melbourne in the Victorian Football Association (VFA) in 1929 and 1930.

=== South Melbourne (VFL) ===
Identified as "C. Fisher" he made South Melbourne's final training list in 1931, and played his first senior game against St Kilda, at the Lake Oval, on 23 May 1931.

=== St Kilda (VFL) ===
In June 1932, Port Melbourne approached South Melbourne for a clearance "for Fisher, a former Port player, but [were told that] he had signed a clearance form to St. Kilda". He was granted a clearance from South Melbourne to St Kilda on 22 June 1932.

Although he appeared on St Kilda's final senior list in 1933, he played with the Second XVIII for the entire season, including the Grand Final which St Kilda lost to Melbourne by a single point on 28 September 1933, and did not play another VFL senior match.

In 1934, he applied for a clearance to Hawthorn, on the grounds that "it [was] easier for him to train at Hawthorn than [at] St. Kilda".

== Optometrist ==
A Fellow of the Victorian Optical Association, and practising as an "Ophthalmic Optician" in Middle Park at least as early as 1930, Fisher was registered (on 13 August 1936) as soon as registration was available under the Victorian Opticians Registration Act 1935.

== Death ==
He died at his home in Mount Waverley, Victoria on 13 April 1988.
