= Albert J. Fisher =

Photographer (1842–1882)

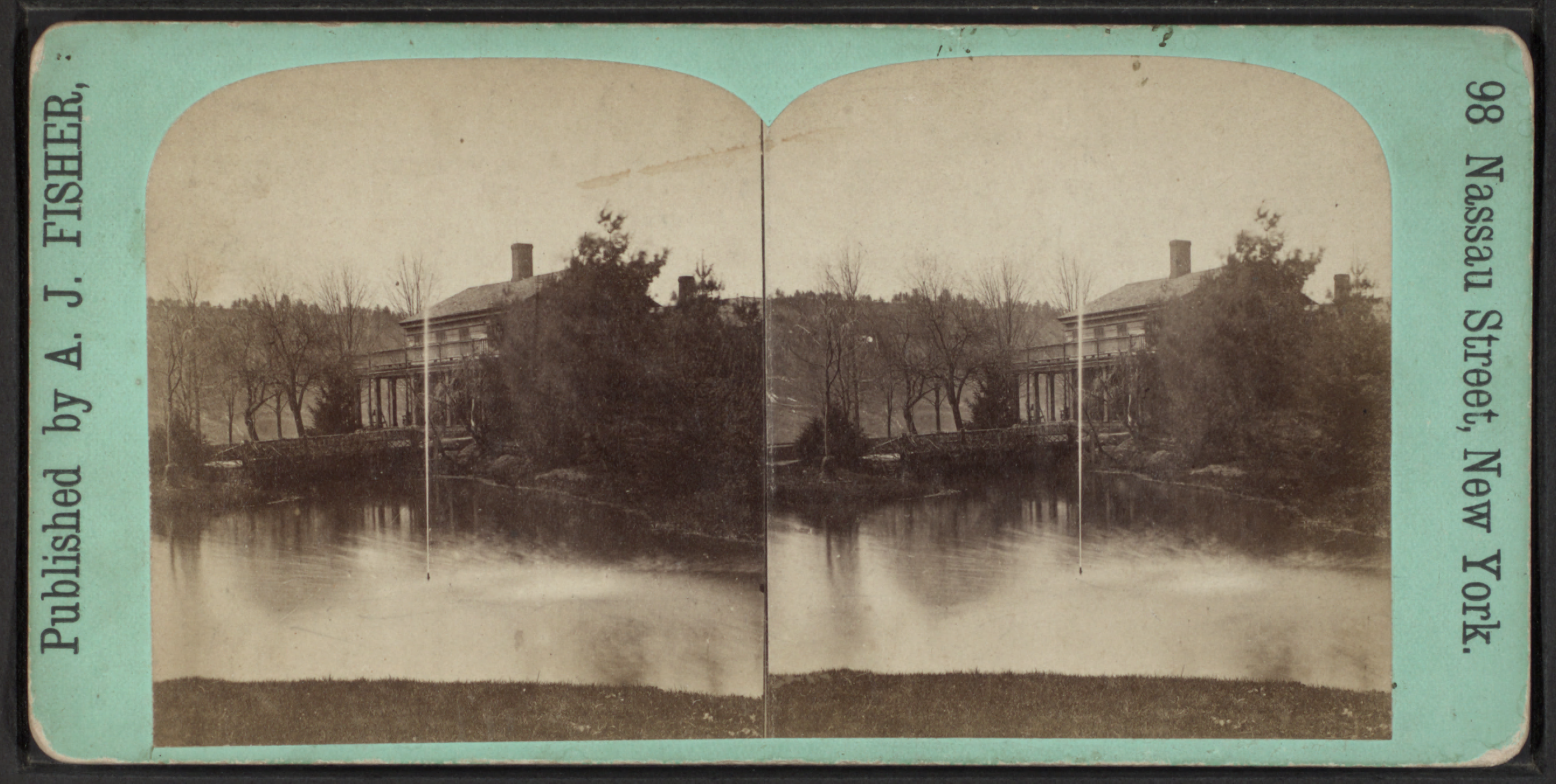
Stereoscopic view of Portage, New York

Albert J. Fisher (1842–1882) was a photographer. He is known for his stereoscopic views. His work is part of the New York Public Library's collection. The Getty Museum also holds his work. The George Eastman Museum also has several of his stereoscopic views.

He published an illustrated book. Fisher & Denison was the publisher and the name of his business.

He produced a stereoscopic view of the Gilsey House in New York City.
