= Bernard Fisher =

Bernard Fisher may refer to:

== People ==
- Bernard Fisher (footballer) (1934–2022), English footballer
- Bernard Fisher (scientist) (1918–2019), researcher in cancer chemotherapy
- Bernard F. Fisher (1927–2014), U.S. Air Force colonel and Medal of Honor recipient
- Red Fisher (sportsman) (Bernard Herbert Fisher, 1914–2006), American sporting goods retailer, columnist and poet, later a radio and television personality in Canada

== Other ==
- MV Maj. Bernard F. Fisher, U.S. Navy vessel named for Bernard Francis Fisher
