= Annie Fisher =

American cook, caterer and entrepreneur

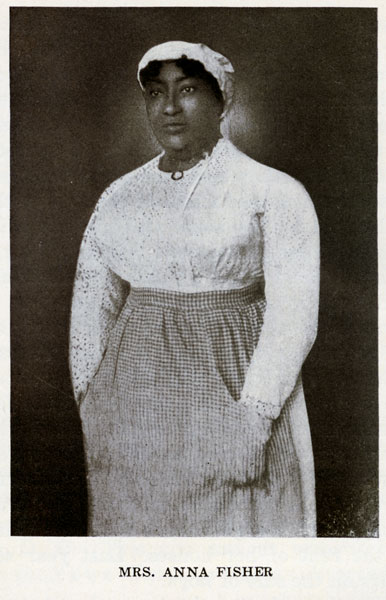
- Fisher, c. 1921
- Born: Anna Knowles; December 3, 1867; Boone County, Missouri, U.S.
- Died: June 11, 1938 (aged 70)
- Resting place: Memorial Park Cemetery
- Occupations: Cook, Caterer, Entrepreneur

Annie Knowles Fisher (December 3, 1867 – June 11, 1938) was an American cook, caterer and entrepreneur. Annie lived in Columbia, Missouri, and worked for prominent families as a cook until she started her own catering business. Fisher became famous in Missouri for her widely sold beaten biscuits. Through her cooking, Fisher amassed a sizable fortune and purchased rental properties and farms in and around Boone County.

== Early life ==
Annie Knowles Fisher was born on December 3, 1867, in Boone County. She was one of eleven children born to formerly enslaved people Robert and Charlotte Knowles . From an early age, Fisher was put in charge of cooking for the family. Although Fisher attended school for a short time, she eventually quit school to help support her family. Fisher found her love of cooking while working in kitchens of wealthy white families in the Columbia area. She was paid little and received second hand clothing as one of the "perks" of the job. Fisher noted later in life for a newspaper article that although she was grateful for the second hand clothing, she wanted to make a good living so that she could afford new clothes. Fisher went to work for the Lenoir-Nifong family of Maplewood. In 1890, Fisher began to work for George Bingham Rollins and the Sigma Alpha Epsilon fraternity at the University of Missouri.

== Cooking, catering and entrepreneurship ==
Fisher saved most of the money she made cooking to start her catering business which she operated out of her restaurant, the Wayside Inn, which was located at the site of her childhood home behind Grindstone schoolhouse. She reportedly had over 1,000 place settings of tableware and handled many large catered events for the University of Missouri. For one of her largest banquets at an alumni dinner for the University of Missouri, she was paid $1,200, two dollars per plate.

Fisher's beaten biscuits became so popular that Missourians who had moved out of state would mail order her biscuits to be delivered to states as far away as New York and California. Annie cooked in what she referred to as, "old Missouri style," which meant she used local ingredients to give her food a distinct flavor. Her cooking became so popular that she began endorsing local businesses such as the Boone County Mill's H-P flour which she used in her famous biscuits. In 1911, a Sedalia hostess who handled catering for the Missouri State fair made sure Fisher's biscuits were on the presidential table for William Howard Taft's visit.

Fisher's ingenuity did not end in the kitchen; she invented a nonstick cutter specifically for her biscuits. After Fisher's mail order business had taken off, she incorporated a biscuit brake to meet the demand for her biscuits. In a news article, Fisher reported she usually made around one million biscuits a year and around 50 dozen biscuits every hour with the help from her daughter.

By 1919, Fisher was making $500 a month on biscuits alone at 15 cents a dozen. Using the profits from her cooking and catering businesses, Fisher bought her first house in 1901 and paid it off in two years. After her first property purchase, Fisher went on to buy 18 rental properties in the downtown Columbia area, most of which were along what is now Ash Street and Fifth Street. Later after Fisher's catering business had become quite successful, she purchased a 58-acre farm outside of Columbia where she raised livestock and crops to use in her cooking.

=== "Old Missouri Style" Beaten Biscuit recipe ===
Fisher's recipe included 1 US quart (0.95 L) of sifted flour, 1/3 cup (~80 mL) of pure lard, 1/3 cup (~80 mL) of butter, 1 cup (~240 mL) of sweetened water, and salt to taste. Ingredients are mixed thoroughly and beaten for 15 minutes to make biscuits light and fluffy. Fisher said beating the biscuits was meant to, "put life into them."

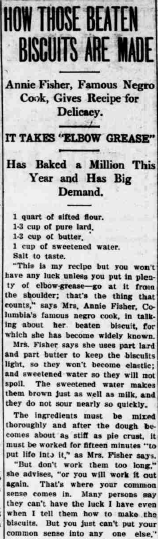
Published in the University Missourian on March 17, 1919

== Personality ==
Fisher was considered by those who met her to be a strong, witty, outspoken businesswoman. In 1919, Fisher gave a speech at a meeting of the National Negro Business League. In her speech, Fisher taught how to make a profit from catering and about her life growing up. She said she was a 57-year-old woman who was not afraid to tell her age.

Fisher was a celebrated personality in Columbia, with multiple articles written about her in the University Missourian. One particularly interesting article was her suggestions for Thanksgiving dinner. Fisher rented her properties out to black families who couldn't find housing easily in 1913. Annie gave out her recipes freely, but noted that she could not teach the common sense needed to cook her food. A 1927 article in the Springfield Leader estimated Fisher's net worth to be $100,000.

== Personal life ==
In 1907, Fisher divorced her husband William and offered him a little over 100 dollars not to contest the divorce in court. William refused and was awarded nothing by the court system. Fisher said that her marriage was not a success and that for her to be successful she had to believe in herself and no one else. Fisher put her daughter Lucille through college and a music conservatory with the profits from her catering business. Fisher's first home was a 16-room house on Park Avenue which stood until 1960. In the 1920s she had a house built along Old Highway 63. During construction, she bought the materials, hired her own workers, and stayed on the property in a tent to oversee construction. Fisher was buried in a modest grave in 1938 at the Memorial Park Cemetery in Columbia.

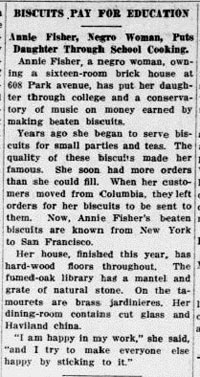
Columbia University Missourian, September 20, 1914, Page 6

== Legacy ==
Fisher's legacy lives on during Black History Month when a Columbia woman dresses as Fisher and visits schools to share her story with children to share with them how local African Americans have helped to shape the history of Boone County. The Annie Fisher food pantry is operated by the Columbia Housing authority, the goal of this local food pantry is to provide nutritional options for growing families and is supplied by the Food Bank of Central and Northeastern Missouri.
