= Doris Fisher =

Doris Fisher may refer to:

- Doris Fisher (songwriter) (1915–2003), United States singer and songwriter
- Doris Fisher, Baroness Fisher of Rednal (1919–2005), British life peer and politician
- Doris F. Fisher (1931–2026), founder of The Gap, Inc.
