= Catherine Fisher (disambiguation) =

Catherine Fisher may refer to:

- Kitty Fisher, Catherine Maria Fisher, courtesan
- Catherine Fisher, author
- Catherine Fisher (Falling Skies), fictional character

== See also ==
- Kate Fisher (disambiguation)
