= Oscar Fisher =

American politician

- Born: February 6, 1812; West Woodstock, Connecticut, U.S.
- Died: May 7, 1882 (aged 70); West Woodstock, Connecticut, U.S.
- Occupations: Educator, judge, politician

Oscar Fisher (February 6, 1812 – May 7, 1882) was an American politician, educator, and judge, based in Connecticut.

== Early life and education ==
Fisher, son of Olcott and Eunice (Royce) Fisher, was born in West Woodstock, Connecticut, on February 6, 1812. He graduated from Yale College in 1836, and was a member of Phi Beta Kappa.

== Career ==
After graduation, Fisher took charge, for a few years, of Nichols Academy, in Dudley, Massachusetts. He also taught in Newark, New Jersey. In widowhood, his health having become impaired by long confinement in school, he retired from this occupation. He had in the meantime read law, and had been admitted to the bar of Windham County, Connecticut, but did not at any time engage in practice. In 1862 Fisher settled permanently in his native town, and the next year represented Woodstock in the Connecticut State Legislature. For fourteen years from 1867 he was Judge of Probate for the district of Woodstock.

== Personal life ==
While working in Massachusetts, Fisher married Jane Fay Bemis, niece and adopted daughter of Phineas Bemis, of Dudley, who died in New Jersey, in 1849, while her husband was engaged in teaching there. He remarried in 1866, to Melissa Haskell, who survived him with two daughters. His only son with his first wife died at the age of twenty. Fisher died in West Woodstock, on May 7, 1882, aged 70 years.
