= Joel H. Fisher =

United States Coast Guard officer

Joel Hilton Fisher
- Born: March 28, 1918; New York City, New York
- Died: September 27, 1997 (aged 79); Baltimore, Maryland
- Spouse(s): Mary Jane Johnson and Helene A. Rich
- Relatives: children: Susan Fisher Sullam and John B. Fisher; stepchildren: Frank Rich and Polly Rich
- Military career
- Allegiance: United States
- Branch: United States Coast Guard
- Rank: Lieutenant Commander
- Conflicts: World War II
- Other work: Lawyer

Joel Hilton Fisher (March 28, 1918 – September 27, 1997) was a Lieutenant Commander of the US Coast Guard and member of the G-5 Intelligence Division of the US Army in World War II.

== Education and early career ==
Fisher graduated from Syracuse University magna cum laude in 1939, and was a Phi Beta Kappa scholar. He graduated from Syracuse University College of Law in 1941. After college, he became an attorney for the United States Department of the Treasury.

== Coast Guard experience ==
After the US entered World War II, Fisher initially tried to enlist in the US Army, but was turned down because of poor eyesight and flat feet. He then enlisted in the United States Coast Guard, where he passed the physical examinations and was commissioned an ensign in 1942. His early assignments were organizing Port Security facilities in the Aleutian Islands of Alaska.

== SHAEF assignment ==
Fisher served 16 months as chief of Supreme Headquarters Allied Expeditionary Force (SHAEF)'s freezing and blocking foreign exchange and property controls section. He reported to Colonel Bernard Bernstein, deputy chief of SHAEF's Financial Division.

=== Task Force Fisher ===
The team of 75 members of the US armed forces working with Fisher became informally known as "Task Force Fisher". Their assignment was to track down stolen valuables taken by the Nazis during the war. They were "...charged with locating and securing the enemy gold and loot before it could be destroyed or moved away." The small unit advanced with combat troops and were sometimes under artillery fire. Once they fired a volley at a German observation post. During the last few months of the war, the Task Force Fisher traveled 1,900 miles and located 6.65 tons of gold and 198,000 pounds of silver.

==== Recoveries ====
Task Force Fisher recovered gold, silver, gemstones and art from various locations in Germany as the Allied Forces advanced in the European Theater of Operations United States Army (ETO). Aue (Zwickau) Reichsbank- 41 sacks of gold bars= 82 gold bars. All bars are re-smelted Belgian gold. Eschwege Reichsbank- 82 gold bars were found. Magdeburg Reichsbank- 6,074 bars of silver and 536 boxes of silver, which were looted from the Hungarian silver reserve. Merkers-Kieselbach- The Merkers mine held most of Germany's precious metals reserves. " Lt. Comdr. Joel H. Fisher, chief, Foreign Exchange and Property Control Section, Financial Branch, G-5 SHAEF... Fisher was assigned the responsibility for preparing inventories of all other mines in the immediate vicinity and to analyze all the testimony developed in interrogations to date with a view toward finding further gold and currency deposits as well as gathering financial and property control intelligence information." Nuremberg Reichsbank had burned 750 million French Francs, valued at the time at $17.2. Plauen- 35 bags of gold coins, 17 bags of US gold dollars, 1 million Swiss gold francs, 151,560 Norwegian gold kroner, 22 bags of German silver coins and 98,450 Dutch guilders. The gold coins, weighing over a ton, had been placed in the Reichsbank by orders of SS Chief Heinrich Himmler in April 1944.

== Legal aid to displaced European Jews ==
In 1946, he married Mary Jane Johnson and, in 1947, the couple moved to Paris, where he was general counsel for the American Jewish Joint Distribution Committee in Europe, which helped to resettle Jewish refugees. Joel Fisher returned to Germany to assist in giving American legal aid to displaced Jews in Germany.

== Post war law career ==
For nearly four decades until his retirement in 1989, Fisher headed Fisher, Sharlitt and Gelband, a legal firm that specialized in aviation law. From 1993 to 1997, Fisher also served as a consultant to the director general of UNESCO.

== Bibliography ==
- Memo from Lt. Commander Joel Fisher, 89tb Infantry Division to Brig. General Frank 1. McSherry, Deputy Assistant Chief of Staff, G-5, April 27, 1945, NACP RG 338"Entry: USFET G-5, Box 13, File: 12312 Correspondence. [213654]
- "Coast Guard Officer Tells of Difficulties in Rounding Up Hoards of Nazi Loot." New York Times. August 12, 1945.
- "Saga of Task Force Fisher: Coast Guard Officer Tells of his ETO Treasure Hunt." Evening News. North Tonawandas, NY, August 15, 1945. Page not given.
- "Intergovernmental Committee on Refugees--Correspondence with Joel Fisher, 1946-47" Box 14, Bernard Bernstein Papers, Harry S. Truman Library.
- Sullam, Susan Fisher. 2014. "The Art of War: A daughter's discovery of a father's quest to bring back what the Nazis stole." Washington Post Magazine. June 22, 2014. Pages 10–17.
