= Ted Fisher =

Australian rules footballer

Personal information
- Full name: Edward Edgar Fisher
- Born: 11 July 1887; Richmond, Victoria
- Died: 24 January 1954 (aged 66); Redfern, New South Wales
- Height: 179 cm (5 ft 10 in)
- Weight: 84 kg (185 lb)

Playing career^{1}
Years	Club	Games (Goals)
1907	St Kilda	1 (0)
1918	Richmond	4 (1)
Total		5 (1)
- ^{1} Playing statistics correct to the end of 1918.

Edward Edgar "Anzac" Fisher (11 July 1887 – 24 January 1954) was a former Australian rules footballer who played with St Kilda and Richmond in the Victorian Football League (VFL).

Fisher was a strong, courageous ruck-rover who came to the Tigers as a result of serving with several Richmond players during the First World War. Fisher was in the A.I.F. for the duration of World War One, firstly at Gallipoli and then in France, hence his nickname "Anzac".

== Family ==
The son of John Hunter Fisher, and Agnes Fisher, née Parker, Edward Edgar Fisher was born at Richmond, Victoria on 11 July 1887.

He married Agnes Pauline Plunkett (1889-) in 1911; they were divorced in 1924.

== Military service ==
He served in the First AIF. He was awarded the Meritorious Service Medal (MSM) on 17 June 1918.

== Death ==
He died at Redfern, New South Wales on 24 January 1954.
