= Sydney Fisher =

Sydney Fisher may refer to:

- Sydney Arthur Fisher (1850–1921), Canadian politician
- Sydney George Fisher (1856–1927), American lawyer and historian
- Sydney Nettleton Fisher (1906–1987), American historian
