= Ross Fisher (footballer) =

Australian rules footballer

Personal information
- Full name: Ross Fisher
- Born: 9 June 1964 (age 62)
- Original team: Gisborne
- Height: 178 cm (5 ft 10 in)
- Weight: 74 kg (163 lb)
- Position: Wing/half back

Playing career^{1}
Years	Club	Games (Goals)
1984	Melbourne	1 (0)
- ^{1} Playing statistics correct to the end of 1984.

Ross Fisher (born 9 June 1964) is a former Australian rules footballer who played with Melbourne in the Victorian Football League (VFL).

Fisher played for the Melbourne Football Club from 1981 to 1984, starting with the U19s and participating in U19 premierships in 1981 and 1983. He was a reserve (RU) in 1982. Unfortunately, he missed the reserves premiership in 1984 due to an injury. Fisher returned to Melbourne from 2004 to 2007 in various roles, including as a runner in 2005. He then moved to Richmond in 2008 and served as an assistant coach at Coburg FC in 2009. In 2010, Fisher became the midfield coach at Williamstown FC. His last known involvement in football was with the Northern Knights (TAC) from 2011 to 2012.
