= Frank Fisher =

Frank Fisher may refer to:

- Frank Fisher (ice hockey) (1907–1983), Canadian ice hockey player
- Frank Fisher (rugby league) (1905–1980), Aboriginal Australian rugby league player
- Frank R. Fisher (1926–2026), American jazz trumpeter, arranger and composer
- Frank Fisher (politician) (1877–1960), New Zealand politician and tennis player
- Franz Jakubowski (1912–1970), Western Marxist theorist, who changed his name to Frank Fisher

== See also ==
- Frank Fischer (fl. 1980s), East German sprint canoer
