= Sally Caldwell Fisher =

American painter

- Born: 1951 (age 74–75); Philadelphia, Pennsylvania
- Education: University of Michigan
- Known for: painting

Sally Caldwell Fisher (born 1951) is an American painter.

== Biography ==
=== Early life ===
Sally Caldwell Fisher was born in Philadelphia, Pennsylvania and raised with several siblings in Michigan. She was given watercolors at an early age by her mother, also an artist, and provided with good materials to create her art.

Fisher graduated from the University of Michigan in 1972 with a degree in English, after that she started selling paintings and waiting tables to earn a living.

=== Career as a painter ===
In the early 1970s, Fisher moved to New England; the life there became her favorite painting subjects.

The art of Sally Caldwell Fisher has been shown on two Yankee Magazine covers and she has been a featured artist in U.S. Art, American Artist, Romantic Homes, Art/Trends and Traditional Home magazines. Caldwell Fisher designed the events posters for the America's Cup Newport in 1983, America's Cup San Diego in 1992 and the Tall Ships, Quebec, 1984. Her art is included in the permanent collections of the White House, Smithsonian Institution, the Bruce Museum, MBNA, Exxon of Japan, Panasonic of Japan and the Mitsui Kagaku Corporation, Tokyo.

Fisher's painting "Rainbow Cats" was chosen to be on the cover of the Decor magazine. Her painting "Maine Regatta" has been chosen to be the poster for 2007 Wooden Boat Show in Mystic, Connecticut.

Fisher was also commissioned to do an original painting for the 2008 Wooden Boat Show in Mystic, Connecticut. She collects old photographs of coastal life and buildings as she said she took much inspiration from them.
