= Maria Anna Fisher =

- Born: c. 1819
- Died: 1911; Brooklyn, NY
- Other names: Anna Maria Fisher
- Occupations: Baker, entrepreneur, and philanthropist
- Known for: Substantial donations to the Tuskegee Institute and Hampton Institute

Maria Anna Fisher (c. 1819–1911), also known as Anna Maria Fisher, was an African American baker, entrepreneur, and philanthropist. Beginning around 1834, at the age of 15, she sold homemade biscuits door to door in Philadelphia, Pennsylvania at 12.5 cents each. With her earnings she eventually purchased a fourteen-room house and more than a dozen other houses that she rented out for additional income. She never raised the price for her biscuits.

== Death and legacy ==
Fisher died in 1911 in Brooklyn, New York and left a $70,000 estate to charities, including the Tuskegee Institute and the Hampton Institute.
