= Ken Fisher (disambiguation) =

Ken Fisher may refer to:

- Kenneth Fisher (born 1950), financial manager & journalist
- Kenneth Fisher (headmaster) (1882–1945), headmaster of Oundle School
- Kenneth Fisher, CEO of Fisher House Foundation
- Ken Fisher, American cartoonist, a.k.a. Ruben Bolling (born 1963)
- Ken Fisher, founder of website Ars Technica
- Ken Fisher, Canadian game creator of Wizard

== See also ==
- Ken Fischer (1945–2006), founder of Trainwreck Circuits
