= Tony Fisher =

Tony Fisher may refer to:

- Tony Fisher (American football) (born 1979), American football player
- Tony Fisher (rugby) (born c. 1944), British rugby footballer
- Tony Fisher (sailor) (1927–2022), Australian sailor
- Big Tony Fisher, bassist for American funk band Trouble Funk
- Tony Fisher (puzzle designer), British puzzle designer

== See also ==
- Toni Fisher (1924–1999), American pop singer
- Anthony Fisher (disambiguation)
