= Ron Fisher (footballer) =

Australian rules footballer, born 1911

Personal information
- Full name: Ronald David Fisher
- Born: 7 August 1911; South Melbourne, Victoria
- Died: 14 June 1993; Queensland
- Original team: Port Melbourne
- Height: 188 cm (6 ft 2 in)
- Weight: 85 kg (187 lb)
- Position: Ruck

Playing career^{1}
Years	Club	Games (Goals)
1933–1938	St Kilda	82 (71)
- ^{1} Playing statistics correct to the end of 1938.

Ronald David Fisher (7 August 1911 – 14 June 1993) was an Australian rules footballer who played with St Kilda in the Victorian Football League (VFL).

Fisher, a ruckman originally from Port Melbourne, played in the seconds at South Melbourne then Footscray, before coming to St Kilda in 1933. He made six senior appearances for St Kilda that year and remained a regular fixture in the team until 1938. Cleared to Ararat in 1939, Fisher was the club's coach for two seasons.

Fisher was captain-coach of Ararat in the Wimmera Football League in 1939 and 1940.

He was the younger brother of South Melbourne and St Kilda footballer Clem Fisher.
