= Rose-Lynn Fisher =

American artist and photographer

- Born: Minneapolis, MN
- Education: Otis Art Institute; University of California Los Angeles; University of California Santa Cruz
- Occupations: Artist and photographer
- Known for: microphotography

Rose-Lynn Fisher (born 1955) is a Los Angeles–based American photographer known for her series Bee and The Topography of Tears.

== Personal life ==
Fisher was born in Minneapolis, Minnesota, in 1955. She studied at Otis Art Institute in Los Angeles, California, receiving her BFA in 1978; she also studied at UCLA and UCSC. She was trained as a painter. She lives in Los Angeles.

== Work ==
Fisher's interests have included microphotography, using both a scanning electron microscope (SEM), and an optical microscope; also aerial photography, photographic research in Morocco, and mixed media painting including geometric patterns and collage.

While studying at Otis Art Institute, Fisher began to focus on geometric patterns and sacred geometry (geometry found in sacred art and architecture). Her fascination with geometric patterns has led her to explore them throughout her career. Through her work with SEMs and bees, she began to focus on hexagons.

Fisher's use of SEMs for photographing bees has touched on the disciplines of art and science. She compiled her photographs into the book Bee (2010).

In 2008 Fisher began to photograph tears with an optical microscope, for her book The Topography of Tears (2017). She sampled over a hundred, varying from "onion" tears to a variety of emotional tears.

== Publications ==
=== Publications by Fisher ===
- Bee. New York: Princeton Architectural Press: 2010. ISBN 1616890762. With a foreword by Verlyn Klinkenborg.
- The Topography of Tears. New York: Bellevue Literary Press, 2017. ISBN 978-1942658283. With forewords by William Frey II and Ann Lauterbach.

=== Publications with contributions by Fisher ===
- Both Sides of Sunset: Photographing Los Angeles. New York: Metropolis Books, 2015. ISBN 9781938922732. Edited by Jane Brown and Marla Hamburg Kennedy. With an introduction by David Ulin and a foreword by Ed Ruscha
- Where Honeybees Thrive: Stories from the Field. University Park, PA: Penn State University Press, 2017. By Heather Swan. ISBN 978-0-271-07741-3.

== Solo exhibition ==
- Fowler Museum, University of California, Los Angeles, 2006.
