= Alexander Fisher (cricketer) =

Australian cricketer

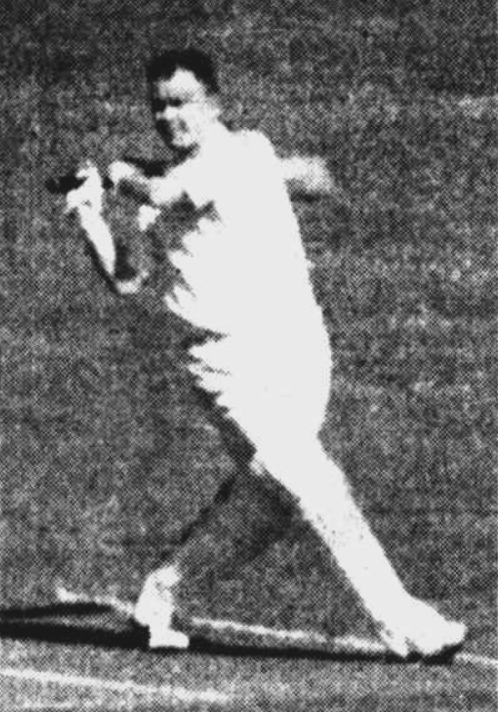

Personal information
- Born: 14 March 1908; Gatton, Queensland, Australia
- Died: 6 October 1968 (aged 60); Maryborough, Queensland, Australia
- Source: Cricinfo, 3 October 2020

Alexander Fisher (14 March 1908 – 6 October 1968) was an Australian cricketer. He played in three first-class matches for Queensland between 1934 and 1936. He also played for Western Suburbs District Cricket Club (Wests).

== See also ==
- List of Queensland first-class cricketers
