= Horace Fisher (painter) =

British painter

Horace Fisher (1861–1928), was a British painter.

Fisher's notable works include "Young Girls Picking Flowers," "A Peasant Girl on a Sunlit Veranda," "Lost in Thought" and "The Orange Sellers."
