= Raymond Fisher =

Raymond or Ray Fisher may refer to:

- Raymond C. Fisher (1939–2020), U.S. judge
- Ray Fisher (baseball) (1887–1982), American baseball player
- Ray Fisher (actor) (born 1987), American actor
- Ray Fisher (defensive lineman) (1934–2025), American football player
- Ray Fisher (cornerback) (born 1987), American football player
- Ray Fisher (singer) (1940–2011), Scottish folk singer

== See also ==
- Ray Fisher Stadium, a baseball stadium in Ann Arbor, Michigan
