= Mary Pat Fisher =

Indian writer

Mary Pat Fisher is an author, her books include the inspirational book Heart of Gold: The Light Within Life and the textbook Living religions: an encyclopedia of the world's faiths.

== Qualifications ==
Lives in the Gobind Sadan, an interfaith community in India, founded by Baba Virsa Singh.

== Bibliography ==
- Fisher, Mary Pat (1985). Heart of Gold: The Light Within Life. Storrs, Conn.: Fenton Valley Press. ISBN 978-0961514952.
- Fisher, Mary Pat (1992). Everyday Miracles in the House of God: Stories from Gobind Sadan India. New Delhi: Gobind Sadan Pubns. ISBN 978-0963329004.
- Fisher, Mary Pat (1997). Living religions: an encyclopedia of the world's faiths. London: I.B. Tauris. ISBN 978-1-86064-148-0. OCLC 41293467.
- Fisher, Mary Pat (2000). An anthology of living religions. Upper Saddle River, N.J.: Prentice Hall. ISBN 978-0-13-015657-0. OCLC 43083659.
- Fisher, Mary Pat (2007). Women in religion. NY: Pearson Longman. ISBN 978-0-321-19481-7. OCLC 56482413.
