= Matthew Fisher =

Matthew Fisher may refer to:

- Matthew Fisher (English cricketer) (born 1997), English cricketer
- Matthew Fisher (New Zealand cricketer) (born 1999), New Zealand cricketer
- Matthew Fisher (musician) (born 1946), English musician, songwriter and producer
- Matthew P. A. Fisher (born 1960), American theoretical physicist
