= Kevin Fisher =

Kevin Fisher is the name of:

- Kevin Fisher (The Young and the Restless), a fictional character
- Kevin Fisher (rugby league), New Zealand rugby player and coach
- Kevin Fisher (footballer) (born 1995), BVI footballer
- Kevin Fisher, a fictional main character from the horror film Final Destination 3

== See also ==
- Cevin Fisher (born 1963), American record producer
