= Anthony Clinton Fisher =

American environmental economist

- Occupations: Environmental economist, academic, and author

Academic background
- Education: A.B. Ph.D.
- Alma mater: Columbia University

Academic work
- Institutions: University of California, Berkeley

Anthony Clinton Fisher is an environmental economist, academic, and author. He is a professor emeritus at the University of California, Berkeley.

Fisher's research interests have included environmental resource assessment, exhaustible resource extraction, energy/economy modeling, water allocation, and climate change economics. He is a fellow of the Association of Environmental and Resource Economists.

== Education and career ==
Fisher completed his A.B. and Ph.D. in Economics from Columbia University. He began his career as an assistant professor of economics at Brown University from 1968 till 1971. Subsequently, he was appointed as a research associate at Resources for the Future, a position he retained till 1973. Between 1973 and 1976, he was employed as an associate professor of economics at the University of Maryland. At the University of California, Berkeley, he held appointments, including as professor of economics, and of Energy and Resources from 1977 to 1987, and was designated as professor of Agricultural and Resource Economics from 1987. He also holds the title of professor emeritus there.

From 2003 to 2004, he was the president of the Association of Environmental and Resource Economists.

== Research ==
Together with Krutilla and Cicchetti, in a study of the economics of environmental preservation, Fisher developed a model of dynamically optimal resource allocation that balanced development and preservation, illustrated through the Hells Canyon dam case. As he emphasized, direct market valuation frameworks specifically rely on the cost and production data, which are typically simpler to acquire than the sort of information required to demonstrate the value of ecological services. His work further highlighted that the market is likely to preserve fewer natural environments than what society would find optimal, because individuals do not capture the full social value of preserved environments, such as existence and bequest values. According to him, this matters because conversion of the environment will be irreversible, involving, for example, loss of an old-growth forest, or of a species, and a flooded canyon that can't be reconstructed.

Fisher has also worked on the economics of climate change. In a paper with Le, he observed that there might be irreversible changes in drivers that have unpredictable effects at an unexpected point in the future, such as exceeding a certain temperature that releases carbon reserves or tipping points. Furthermore, he also categorized two errors: type 1 (a comparatively mild mitigation policy may have catastrophic climatic implications) and type 2 (an aggressive mitigation policy may result in excessively expensive costs), and argued that the latter is more reversible.

In a series of empirical studies of the potential impact of climate change on agriculture with Schlenker and Hanemann, Fisher documented that warming is predicted to result in losses to the agricultural sector in the U.S. due primarily to an increase in periods of extreme temperatures, as distinguished from the increase in average temperature, that will impact the land values and crop yields. Additionally, he observed a significant difference in the impact of climate on land values in non-irrigated and irrigated regions, indicating that disregarding historical irrigation infrastructure investments may be biased. He also highlighted that decreased water availability from all sources had a negative impact on farmland values.

In a collaborative research study with Arrow, Fisher highlighted the potential significance of quasi option value related to the prospective advantages associated with waiting for more accurate data before making an irreversible decision. Together with Albers and Hanemann, in a theoretical and empirical study of tropical forest management, he showed the significance of option value in shifting the economic balance for forest preservation.

== Awards and honors ==
- 1995 – Publication of Enduring Quality Award, Association of Environmental and Resource Economists (AERE)
- 2006 – Fellow, Association of Environmental and Resource Economists

== Bibliography ==
=== Books ===
- Fisher, Anthony C. (1981). Resource and Environmental Economics. Cambridge University Press. ISBN 9780521243063.
- Krutilla, John V.; Fisher, Anthony C. (1985). The Economics of Natural Environments: Studies in the Valuation of Commodity and Amenity Resources. Resources for the Future. ISBN 9780915707195.
- Fisher, Anthony C. (1995). Environmental and Resource Economics: Selected Essays of Anthony C. Fisher. E. Elgar. ISBN 9781852789749.
- Fisher, Anthony C. (2020). Lecture Notes on Resource and Environmental Economics. Springer International Publishing. ISBN 9783030489588.

=== Selected articles ===
- Fisher, Anthony C.; Krutilla, John V.; Cicchetti, Charles J. (1972). "The Economics of Environmental Preservation: A Theoretical and Empirical Analysis". The American Economic Review. 62 (4): 605–619.
- Fisher, Anthony C. (1 January 1973). "A Paradox in the Theory of Public Investment". Journal of Public Economics. 2 (4): 405–407. doi:10.1016/0047-2727(73)90029-7.
- Arrow, Kenneth J.; Fisher, Anthony C. (May 1974). "Environmental Preservation, Uncertainty, and Irreversibility". The Quarterly Journal of Economics. 88 (2): 312. doi:10.2307/1883074. JSTOR 1883074.
- Fisher, Anthony C.; Krutilla, John V. (1975). "Resource Conservation, Environmental Preservation, and the Rate of Discount". The Quarterly Journal of Economics. 89 (3): 358. doi:10.2307/1885257. JSTOR 1885257.
- Cicchetti, Charles J.; Fisher, Anthony C.; Smith, V. Kerry (1976). "An Econometric Evaluation of a Generalized Consumer Surplus Measure: The Mineral King Controversy". Econometrica. 44 (6): 1259–1276. doi:10.2307/1914259. JSTOR 1914259.
- Albers, Heidi J.; Fisher, Anthony C.; Hanemann, W. Michael (1996). "Valuation and management of tropical forests". Environmental and Resource Economics. 8 (1): 39–61. doi:10.1007/BF00340652.
- Fisher, Anthony C.; Le, Phu V. (2014). "Climate Policy: Science, Economics, and Extremes". Review of Environmental Economics and Policy. 8 (2): 307–327. doi:10.1093/reep/reu009.
- Schlenker, Wolfram; Michael Hanemann, W; Fisher, Anthony C (2005). "Will U.S. Agriculture Really Benefit from Global Warming? Accounting for Irrigation in the Hedonic Approach". American Economic Review. 95 (1): 395–406. doi:10.1257/0002828053828455.
- Schlenker, Wolfram; Hanemann, W. Michael; Fisher, Anthony C. (2006). "The Impact of Global Warming on U.S. Agriculture: An Econometric Analysis of Optimal Growing Conditions". Review of Economics and Statistics. 88 (1): 113–125. doi:10.1162/rest.2006.88.1.113.
- Schlenker, Wolfram; Hanemann, W. Michael; Fisher, Anthony C. (2007). "Water Availability, Degree Days, and the Potential Impact of Climate Change on Irrigated Agriculture in California". Climatic Change. 81 (1): 19–38. doi:10.1007/s10584-005-9008-z.
