= Steve Fisher =

Steve Fisher may refer to:

- Steve Fisher (basketball) (born 1945), American college basketball coach
- Steve Fisher (writer) (1913–1980), American pulp writer and screenwriter
- Steve Fisher (snowboarder) (born 1982), American snowboarder
- Steve Fisher (cyclist) (born 1990), American cyclist
- Steve Fisher (Neighbours), fictional character on the Australian soap opera Neighbours
- Steve Fisher (kayaker), extreme whitewater kayaker and filmmaker
