= Walter Fisher =

Walter Fisher may refer to:

- Walter Fisher (MP), member of parliament for Hythe
- Walter Fisher (missionary), (1865–1935) medical missionary to Zambia
- Walter Fisher (professor) (1931–2018), American professor
- Walter Fisher (baseball) (1867–1921), American baseball player
- Walter H. Fisher (1849–1890), English singer and actor
- Walter Kenrick Fisher (1878–1953), American marine biologist, zoologist and illustrator
- Walter L. Fisher (1862–1935), United States Secretary of the Interior
