= Anna Fisher =

Anna Fisher may refer to:

- Anna Lee Fisher (born 1949), American chemist and NASA astronaut
- Anna S. Fisher (1873–1942), American artist and teacher, from Cold Brook, New York
- Anna L. Fisher (active 1910s–1930s), American advisor to Faisal I of Iraq
- Anna Fisher Beiler (1848–1904), née Fisher, British-born American Christian missionary and newspaper editor

== See also ==
- Anna Fischer (born 1986), German actress and singer
