= J. Richard Fisher =

American astronomer

James Richard Fisher
- Born: December 10, 1943 (age 82); Pittsburgh, Pennsylvania
- Occupations: Astronomer, NRAO
- Known for: Tully–Fisher relation

James Richard Fisher (born December 10, 1943) is an American astronomer. He received his Ph.D. in Astronomy in 1972 from the University of Maryland, College Park and his B.S. in Physics in 1965 from the Pennsylvania State University, University Park.

== Education and research ==
Much of Fisher's career has involved radio astronomy instrumentation, including telescope feed design, radio frequency interference mitigation, and signal processing. He joined NRAO in 1972 at the Green Bank, West Virginia site. He was part of the team that conceived and designed the 100-meter Green Bank Telescope there. He moved to the Central Development Lab at the Charlottesville NRAO headquarters in 2005, where he retired in 2012 but continues to be active in instrumentation projects.

In 1978 through 1980 he spent 18 months at the Radiophysics Laboratory of CSIRO in Sydney, Australia, and on the return trip spent 2 months at the Raman Research Institute in Bangalore, India.

Along with R. Brent Tully, he proposed the Tully–Fisher relation, a correlation between the luminosity of a galaxy and the width of emission lines in its spectrum.
