= Herbert Fisher =

Herbert Fisher may refer to:

- H. A. L. Fisher (1865–1940), English historian, educator and politician
- Herbert William Fisher (1826–1903), British historian, father of H. A. L. Fisher
- Herbert O. Fisher (1909–1990), American test pilot and aviation executive
- Herbert Fisher (businessman), American businessman
