= Fischer =

Fischer is a German occupational surname, meaning fisherman. The name Fischer is the fourth most common German surname. The English version is Fisher.

== People with the surname ==
=== A ===
- Abraham Fischer (1850–1913) South African public official
- Adam Fischer (disambiguation)
- Adolf Fischer (disambiguation)
- Alfred Fischer (disambiguation)
- Andrea Fischer (born 1960), German politician
- Andrea Fischer (scientist), (born 1973), Austrian glaciologist
- Andrew Fischer (disambiguation)
- Alexander Fischer (born 1986), Danish footballer
- Angeline Fuller Fischer (1841–1925), American writer
- Ann Kindrick Fischer (1919–1971), American social anthropologist
- Anna Fischer (born 1986), German actress and singer
- Anna von Fischer, one of the married names of Anna Leibbrand (1902–1972), German political activist and writer
- Annie Fischer (1914–1995), Hungarian pianist
- Anton Fischer (disambiguation)
- Arthur Fischer (disambiguation)
- Axel Fischer (born 1966), German politician

=== B ===
- Benjamin Fischer (disambiguation)
- Bernd Fischer (disambiguation)
- Birgit Fischer (born 1962), German kayaker
- Bob Fischer (disambiguation)
- Bobby Fischer (1943 – 2008), American chess grandmaster and the eleventh World Chess Champion
- Bram Fischer (1908–1975), South African lawyer

=== C ===
- Carl Fischer (disambiguation)
- Carlos Fischer (1903–1969), Uruguayan politician, President of the National Council of Government in 1958
- Caroline Fischer-Achten (1806–1896), Austrian opera singer
- Catherine Fischer (born 1947), American deafblind author
- Christian Fischer (born 1997), American ice hockey forward
- Christopher Fischer (born 1988), German ice hockey defenseman
- Clare Fischer (1928–2012), American composer, arranger, and pianist
- Claude S. Fischer (born 1948), American sociologist

=== D ===
- D'or Fischer (born 1981), Israeli-American basketball player in the Israeli National League
- Dale S. Fischer (born 1951), US district court judge
- Dana Fischer (born 2010), American Magic: The Gathering player
- David Fischer (disambiguation)
- Deb Fischer (born 1951), American politician
- Debra Fischer (born 1953), American astronomer
- Diego Fischer (born 1961), Uruguayan journalist and writer
- Dietrich Fischer-Dieskau (1925–2012), German baritone and conductor
- Dirk Fischer (politician) (born 1943), German politician

=== E ===
- Edmond H. Fischer (1920–2021), Swiss-American biochemist
- Eduard Fischer (disambiguation)
- Edward F. Fischer, professor of anthropology at Vanderbilt University
- Edwin Fischer (1886–1960), Swiss pianist and conductor
- Elizabeth Fischer Monastero, American mezzo-soprano
- Emil Fischer (disambiguation)
- Emily V. Fischer (born 1979 or 1980), American atmospheric chemist
- Ernst Fischer (disambiguation)
- Esther Fischer-Homberger (1940–2019), Swiss psychiatrist and medical historian
- Eugen Fischer (1874–1967), anthropologist, doctor and member of the Nazi party
- Eugen Fischer (historian) (1899–1973), German geologist and historian
- Eva Fischer (1920–2015), Croatian Italian artist

=== F ===
- Franz Fischer (disambiguation)
- Fred Fischer (1905 - 1981), Austrian photographer based in Curaçao
- Friedrich Fischer (disambiguation)
- Fritz Fischer (disambiguation)

=== G ===
- Georg Fischer (disambiguation)
- George Fischer (disambiguation)
- Gerhard Fischer (disambiguation)
- Gisela Fischer (1929–2014), German actress
- Gottfried Fischer (1944–2013), German psychologist, psychotherapist and psychoanalyst
- Gottfried Bermann Fischer (1897–1995), Jewish-German publisher of the S. Fischer Verlag
- Gotthelf Fischer von Waldheim (1771–1853), German palaeontologist and entomologist.
- Gotthilf Fischer (1928–2020), German choral conductor
- Greg Fischer (born 1958), American businessman and mayor of Louisville, KY
- Gregor Fischer (1834–unknown), Bavarian-Liechtensteiner teacher and politician
- Gustav Fischer (disambiguation)

=== H ===
- Hans Fischer (disambiguation)
- Harold Fischer (1925–2009), American Korean War flying ace
- Heidemarie Fischer (1944–2022), German politician
- Heike Fischer (born 1982), German diver
- Heinz Fischer (born 1938), federal president of Austria
- Helen Fischer (1912–1986), American politician
- Helene Fischer (born 1984), German pop music singer
- Henry Fischer (disambiguation)
- Hermann Fischer (disambiguation)
- Horst Fischer (1912–1966), German SS concentration camp doctor executed for war crimes
- Howard Fischer, curator of the New York Jazz Museum

=== I ===
- Ignjat Fischer (1870–1948), Croatian architect
- Ilse Fischer (born 1975), Austrian mathematician
- Iván Fischer (born 1951), Jewish-Hungarian conductor
- Ivana Fišer or Ivana Fischer (1905–1967), Croatian conductor

=== J ===
- James Fischer (1927–2004), American engineer
- Jan Fischer (disambiguation)
- Jason Fischer (disambiguation)
- Jean Fischer (disambiguation)
- Jenna Fischer (born 1974), American actress
- Jiří Fischer (born 1980), Czech ice hockey player
- Joey Fischer (1976–1993), American murder victim
- Johann Fischer (disambiguation)
- Johannes Fischer (1887–?), German physicist
- John Fischer (disambiguation)
- Jonathan Fischer (born 2001), Danish footballer
- Joschka Fischer (born 1948), German foreign minister
- Joseph Fischer (disambiguation)
- Julia Fischer (born 1983), German violinist

=== K ===
- Karl Fischer (disambiguation)
- Kate Fischer (born 1973), Australian model and actress
- Klaus Fischer (born 1949), German football (soccer) player and coach
- Kuno Fischer (1824–1907), German philosopher
- Kurt Fischer (disambiguation), multiple people

=== L ===
- Laurence Fischer (born 1973), French karateka
- Leni Fischer (1935–2022), German politician
- Lisa Fischer (born 1958), American singer
- Lothar Fischer (1933–2004), German sculptor
- Louis Fischer (1896–1970), American journalist
- Lucien Fischer (born 1933), French Roman Catholic bishop
- Ludwig Fischer (disambiguation)

=== M ===
- Manuel Fischer (born 1989), German footballer
- Marcel Fischer (born 1978), Swiss fencer
- Martin Fischer (disambiguation)
- Mathias Fischer (disambiguation)
- Michael Fischer (disambiguation)
- Minna Fischer (1858–1941), Australian soprano and singing teacher in London
- Móric Fischer de Farkasházy (1799–1880), Hungarian porcelain manufacturer
- Moses Fischer (c. 1756–c. 1833), Austrian rabbi

=== N ===
- Nilla Fischer (born 1984), Swedish (soccer) football player

=== O ===
- Oskar Fischer (disambiguation), multiple people
- Ottfried Fischer (born 1953), German actor and cabaret artist
- Otto Fischer (disambiguation)
- Øystein Fischer (1942–2013), Norwegian physicist

=== P ===
- Patrick Fischer (disambiguation)
- Paul Fischer (disambiguation)
- Pierre Fischer (born 1995), German politician

=== R ===
- Rainer Fischer (born 1949), German-Canadian judoka
- Ralf-Dieter Fischer (1948–2025), German politician
- Ricardo Fischer (born 1991), Brazilian basketball player
- Richard Fischer (1917–1969), Austrian footballer
- Robert Fischer (disambiguation)
- Ruth Fischer (1895–1961), German communist

=== S ===
- Samuel von Fischer (1859–1934), German publisher, founder of the S. Fischer Verlag
- Sascha Fischer (born 1971), German rugby union player
- Saskia Fischer (born 1966), German actress
- Scott Fischer (1956–1996), American mountain guide
- Simone Fischer (born 1979), German politician
- Stanley Fischer (1943–2025), American and Israeli central banker
- Steven Thomas Fischer (born 1972) American filmmaker and cartoonist of German descent
- Stewart "Dirk" Fischer (1924–2013), American composer, musician and jazz educator
- Sven Fischer (born 1971), German biathlete
- Sven Fischer (footballer) (born 1977), German football defender

=== T ===
- Tex Fischer, American politician
- Theobald Fischer (1846–1910), German geographer
- Theodor Fischer (disambiguation)
- Thomas Fischer (disambiguation), several people
- Thierry Fischer (born 1957), Swiss conductor and flautist
- Tim Fischer (1946–2019), Australian politician
- Tine Fischer, Danish film executive, appointed head of the Danish Film Institute from August 2024

=== V ===
- Vera Fischer (disambiguation)
- Vic Fischer (1924–2023), American politician
- Viktor Fischer (born 1994), Danish football player
- Viktor Fischer (wrestler) (1892–1977), Austrian Olympic wrestler

=== W ===
- Werner Fischer (disambiguation)
- Wild Man Fischer (1945–2011), American outsider musician
- Wilhelm Fischer (disambiguation)

=== Z ===
- Zel M. Fischer (born 1963), Missouri Supreme Court judge

== See also ==
- Fischler
