= Fischel =

Fischel (Yiddish: פֿישל) as first name is the Yiddish-derived form of the Hebrew name Ephraim. Notable people with the surname include:

- Arnold Fischel (1830–1894), Dutch rabbi
- Astrid Fischel Volio (born 1954), Costa Rican historian and politician
- Daniel Fischel (born 1950), American educator
- David Fischel (born 1958), British businessman
- Edna Fischel Gellhorn (1878–1970), American suffragist and reformer
- Eduard Fischel (1826–1863), German publicist
- Harry Fischel (1865–1948), American businessman
- Henry A. Fischel (1913–2008), German-born American educator and writer
- Jack Fischel, American academic
- Mario Fischel (born 1958), German actor
- Robert Fischell (born 1929), American physicist

== See also ==
- Fischl
- Fishel
