= Lisker =

Lisker is a surname. Notable people with the surname include:

- Bruce Lisker (born 1965), American man wrongly convicted of murder
- Leigh Lisker (1918–2006), American linguist and phonetician

== See also ==
- Fisker (surname)
- Lisker's sign
- Nisker
