= Fisker (surname) =

Fisker is a Scandinavian surname meaning 'fisher' (fisherman), in Danish and Norwegian. Its English cognate is the surname Fisher.

== People ==
Persons with the surname Fisker include:

- Henrik Fisker (born 1963), automobile designer and executive chairman of Fisker Automotive
- Henrik Fisker (admiral) (1720–1797), Danish admiral
- Kasper Fisker (born 1988), Danish soccer player
- Kay Fisker (1893–1965), Danish architect
- Knud Erik Fisker (born 1960), Danish soccer referee
- Lorentz Fisker (1753–1819), Danish military officer and oceanographer/geographer
- Lorentz Fisker (mayor) (1684–1757), amtsforvalter (county officer) for Nysted and byfoged (county officer) for København
- Lorentz Fisker (judge) (1731–1779), lagmann county officer for Christiansand og Agdesidens
- Maria Fisker (born 1990), Danish handball player
- Peder Andersen Fisker, builder of the Danish motorcycle Nimbus in partnership with H. M. Nielsen
- Sisse Fisker (born 1976), Danish television presenter

== Similar cognates in other languages ==
- Czech: Fišer (surname)
- English: Fisher (surname)
- German: Fischer (surname)
- Polish: Fiszer (surname)

== See also ==
- Fischer (disambiguation)
