= Fiser (disambiguation) =

Fiser may refer to:

== People ==
- Fišer (feminine: Fišerová; Czech: Fisher), a Czech surname of German origin meaning fisherman
- Amber Fiser, U.S. softball player
- John Calvin Fiser (1838-1876) C. S. A. soldier
- Lud Fiser (1908-1990) U.S., American football and baseball, player and coach
- Paul Fiser (1908-1978) U.S. American football coach

== Places ==
- Fișer (river), a river in Romania; a tributary of the river Cozd
- Fișer, a village in Rupea town, Brașov County, Romania

== Other uses ==
- FiSER (rheometer), an extensional rheometer, see rheometer#FiSER
