= Fishel =

Fishel is a surname. Notable people with the surname include:

- Craig Fishel, American politician
- Danielle Fishel (born 1981), American actress, director, and model
- Dick Fishel (1909–1972), American football player
- Ed Fishel (1914–1999), American lifelong artist, historian, war correspondent and magazine editor
- Elizabeth Fishel, journalist and author
- Greg Fishel (born 1957), American meteorologist
- Haim Fishel Epstein (1874–1942), Lithuanian-American rabbi
- John Fishel (born 1962), American baseball player
- Leo Fishel (1877–1960), baseball player
- Matt Fishel, British singer, songwriter, musician, music producer and record label owner
- Mia Fishel (born 2001), American soccer player
- Simon Fishel (born 1953), English physiologist, biochemist and pioneering in vitro fertilization specialist
- Wesley R. Fishel (1919–1977), American political scientist
- Yechiel Fishel Eisenbach (1925–2008), Haredi rabbi and long-time rosh yeshiva
- Yerucham Fishel Perlow, Polish halakhist

== Given name ==
- Fishel Hershkowitz (1922–2017), American Hasidic rabbi
- Fishel Jacobs (born 1956), American rabbi

== See also ==
- Fischel
- Fischl
