= Adam Fisher =

Adam Fisher may refer to:

- Adam Fisher (baseball), baseball executive
- Adam Fisher (basketball) (born 1984), head coach of the Temple Owls men's basketball team

== See also ==
- Adam Fisher Homestead
- Adam Fischer (disambiguation)
- Ada Fisher, American physician and political candidate
