= Bob Fisher =

Bob Fisher may refer to:

== Sports ==
- Bob Fisher (baseball) (1886–1963), baseball player who played shortstop from 1912 to 1919
- Bob Fisher (American football coach) (1887–1942), American football player and coach
- Bob Fisher (offensive lineman) (1916–1983), American football player and shot putter
- Bob Fisher (football manager), English association football manager active in France
- Bob Fisher (Australian footballer) (1929–2021), Australian rules footballer
- Bob Fisher (tight end) (born 1958), American football tight end
- Bobby Fisher (footballer) (born 1956), English retired footballer

== Other ==
- Bob Fisher (screenwriter) (fl. 2000s), screenwriter whose credits include Wedding Crashers

== See also ==
- Bobby Fischer (1943–2008), chess grandmaster
- Robert Fisher (disambiguation)
- Bob Fischer (disambiguation)
- Robert Fischer (disambiguation)
