= Fieser =

Fieser is a surname. Notable people with the surname include:

- James Fieser, American philosopher and academic
- Louis Fieser (1899–1977), American organic chemist
- Mary Peters Fieser (1909–1997), American chemist, wife of Louis

== See also ==
- Fišer
