= Arthur Fisher =

Arthur Fisher may refer to:

- Arthur Fisher (British Army officer) (1899–1972), British general
- Arthur Fisher (politician) (1901–1958), Australian politician
- Arthur Fisher (rugby league), rugby league footballer of the 1940s and 1950s
- Arthur Elwell Fisher (1848–?), English composer and musician
- Arthur Fisher (New Zealand cricketer) (1871–1961), New Zealand cricketer
- Arthur Fisher (Australian sportsman) (1882–1968), Australian cricketer
- Arthur Fisher (real estate broker), American businessman and diplomat
- Arthur Addison Fisher (1878–1965), American architect
- A. S. T. Fisher (Arthur Stanley Theodore Fisher), 20th-century English priest and writer
- Art Fisher, comedian who coined stage names of the Marx Brothers

== See also ==
- Arthur Fischer (disambiguation)
