= Fišer =

Fišer (feminine Fišerová) is a Czech surname, a transcription of the German surname Fischer. An Anglicised form of the surname is Fiser. Notable people with the surname include:

- Ivana Fišer (1905–1967), Croatian conductor
- Jan Fišer (born 1944), Czech architect and designer
- John Calvin Fiser (1838–1876), American merchant and soldier
- Luboš Fišer (1935–1999), Czech composer
- Lud Fiser (1908–1990), American athlete and coach
- Nelly Fišerová (1905–1941/42), Czech chess master
- Paul Fiser (1908–1978), American football coach
- Stanislav Fišer (1931–2022), Czech actor and voice actor
- Tereza Fišerová (born 1998), Czech canoeist
- Václav Fišer (1930–2007), Czech athlete
- Egon Bondy, pen name of Zbyněk Fišer (1930–2007), Czech writer, poet and philosopher
