= Bruno Franz Kaulbach =

Austrian lawyer (1880–1963)

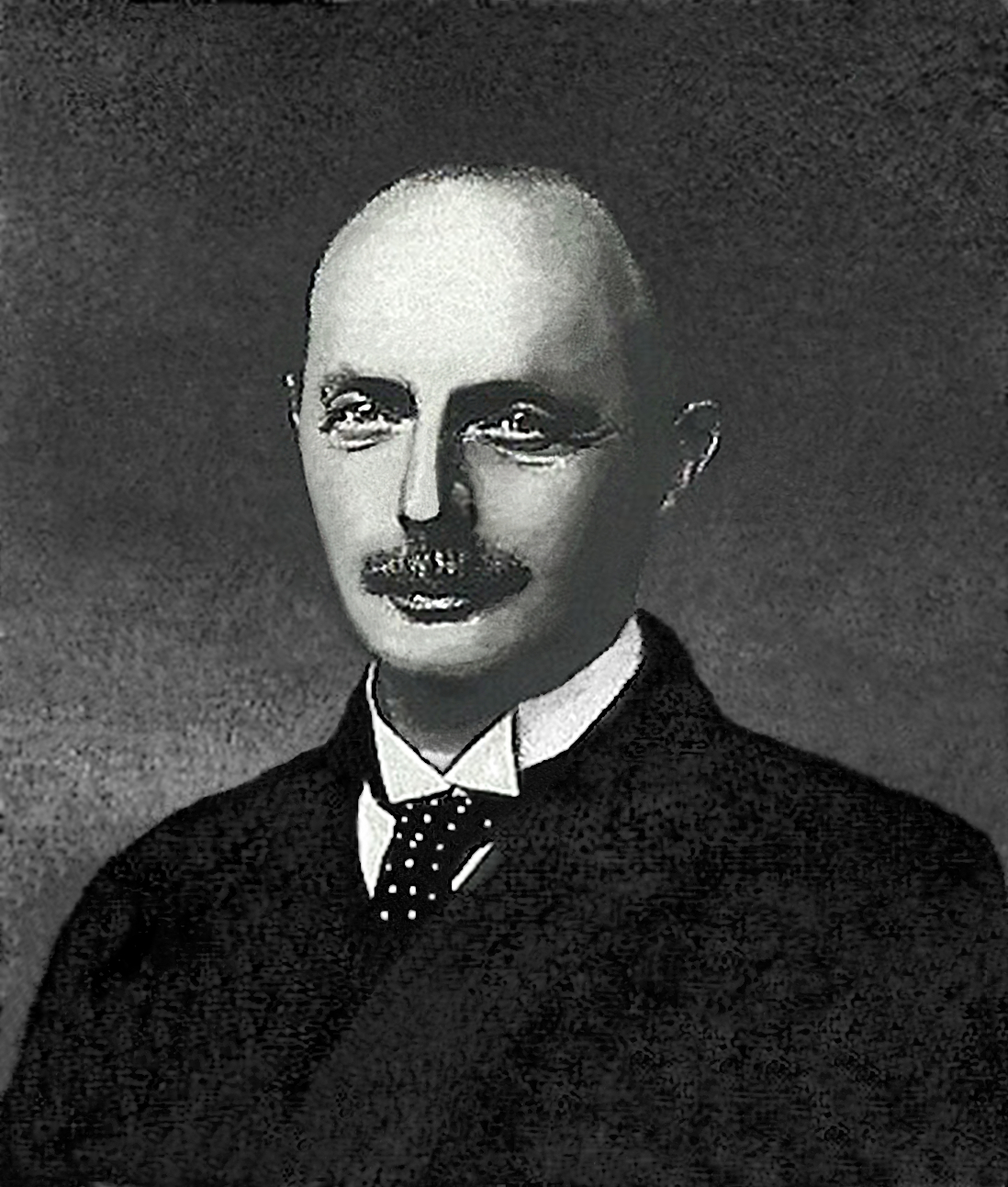
- Born: 1880; Horni Benesov, Austro-Hungarian Empire
- Died: 1963 (aged 82–83); Hall in Tirol, Austria
- Occupation: Lawyer

Bruno Franz Kaulbach (1880–1963) was an Austrian lawyer and a member of the Kohn family from Bennisch whose descendants include the former U.S. Secretary of State John Kerry.

== Early life and education ==
Dr. Bruno Franz Kaulbach was born Bruno Franz Kohn on 29 December 1880, the first son of Bernard Kohn (1854-1915) and Hermine Kolban (1861-1939). The Kohn family was part of a small Jewish community in the town of Bennisch (now Horni Benesov, Czech Republic) which was then part of Austria-Hungary. Bruno and his three brothers, Alfred, Richard and Oskar changed their surnames to 'Kaulbach' in the early 1900s. At about the same time, they renounced the Jewish faith and converted to Roman Catholicism. Bruno completed his law studies at the University of Vienna in 1912. In the same year, he married Maria Theresia Hinterholzer Meyer (1886-1972), who came from a prominent business and political family in Innsbruck and whose uncle was the painter and political activist Edgar Meyer (painter).

== Career ==
During the First World War, Bruno served as a first lieutenant in the Austro-Hungarian Army. For a time, Bruno and Maria lived in Graz, where Bruno worked as a lawyer and where their children, Martin and Eva, were born. Bruno was also a regular contributor to magazines and newspapers.

By 1935, Bruno and his family were living in Hall in Tirol. With the rise of National Socialism and because of his Jewish heritage, Bruno realised his children would be in danger. He was instrumental in resettling them in England, where they eventually became British citizens.

On 12 August 1943, Bruno Kaulbach was arrested by the Gestapo in Innsbruck. He was transferred to Dachau Concentration Camp and held there as a political prisoner until the camp was liberated on 29 April 1945. His three brothers, together with members of their families, were murdered by the Nazis during the Holocaust. Only Richard Kaulbach's daughter, Ilse, escaped - to the U.S.

In December 1948, Bruno spoke at the American War Crimes Court, Dachau. He cited the hardship and suffering inflicted on the people of Tirol by the Nazi Gauleiter, Franz Hofer, and suggested that American complicity was to blame for Hofer's escape from internment camp Bruno Kaulbach died in 1963 at Hall in Tirol.

In 1979, he was posthumously awarded the Decoration for Services to the Liberation of Austria (Ehrenzeichen für Verdienste um die Befreiung Österreichs) "for active service in the Resistance to National Socialism", by the Austrian government.

== Connection with the Kerry Family ==
When John Forbes Kerry ran for the United States Presidency in 2004, little was known about his paternal ancestry. Researchers, hired by the Boston Globe newspaper, discovered that Kerry's great-grandfather was a Jewish brewer named Benedikt Kohn (1824-1876) from the Austrian town of Bennisch (now Horni Benesov, Czech Republic). One of Benedikt's sons, Fritz, adopted the family name of 'Kerry'. In 1904, Fritz Kerry (John Kerry's grandfather) and his family left Austria for a new life in the United States.

Another son of Benedikt Kohn was Bernard Kohn, Bruno Kaulbach's father; John Kerry and Bruno Kaulbach were first cousins once removed. The trajectory of the Kaulbach strand of the family, previously unknown because of the name change, was revealed by the Boston Globe newspaper in the fall of 2013
