= Emil Fischer (disambiguation) =

Emil Fischer (1852–1919) was a German Nobel laureate in chemistry.

Emil Fischer may also refer to:

- Emil Fischer (American football executive) (1887–1958), American football executive and businessman
- Emil Fischer (bass) (1838–1914), German dramatic basso
- Emil Fischer (cartographer) (1838/9–1898), German-born American cartographer

== See also ==
- Franz Joseph Emil Fischer (1877–1947), German chemist, worked with oil and coal
