= Fischer (disambiguation) =

Fischer is a surname.

It may also refer to:

- Fischer (company), an Austrian company that produces Nordic skiing, alpine skiing, tennis and hockey equipment
- Fischer, Behar, Chen, Well, Orion & Co., a law firm in Israel
- Fischer catalog, listing of postage stamps relating to Poland
- Fischer's lovebird (Agapornis fischeri), small parrot species
- Fischer Brewery, an Alsatian brewery
- Fischer Motor Company, a U.S. motorcycle manufacturer
- Fischerspooner, a New York based electronica band
- Fischer-Z, British rock band
- Fischer, Texas, U.S.
- Fischer Racing, a German auto racing team
- Koss, Michigan, formerly named Fischer
- S. Fischer Verlag, a German publishing house
- Fischerwerke, a German construction fixings manufacturer
- Fischer, South Australia, a locality in the Mid North between Gawler and Mallala
- Fischer (crater), a lunar impact crater in the walled plain Mendeleev

== See also ==
- Fisher (disambiguation)
