= Benjamin Fisher (disambiguation) =

Benjamin Fisher (1842–1920) was a South Australian accountant and auctioneer.

Benjamin Fisher may also refer to:

- Benjamin F. Fisher (1834–1915), American General in the American Civil War
- Ben Fisher (born 1981), Scottish international rugby league footballer and coach

== See also ==
- Benjamin Fischer (disambiguation)
