= Ernst Fischer =

Ernst Fischer may refer to:

- Ernst Fischer (composer) (1900–1975), German composer and keyboard player
- Ernst Fischer (journalist) (1942–2016), German journalist
- Ernst Fischer (weightlifter) (1904–?), Swiss Olympic weightlifter
- Ernst Fischer (writer) (1899–1972), Austrian journalist, writer and politician
- Ernst Gottfried Fischer (1754–1831), German chemist developer of stoichiometry theory together with Jeremias Richter
- Kuno Fischer (Ernst Kuno Berthold Fischer, 1824–1907), German philosopher
- Ernst Otto Fischer (1918–2007), German chemist, Nobel Prize winner
- Ernst Peter Fischer (born 1947), German historian of science, and science publicist
- Ernst Sigismund Fischer (1875–1954), Austrian mathematician

== See also ==
- Fischer
