= Thomas Fisher =

Thomas Fisher may refer to:

- Thomas Fisher (MP) (died 1577), English politician
- Thomas Fisher (died 1613), Member of Parliament for Taunton
- Thomas Fisher (antiquary) (1772–1836), English antiquary
- Thomas Fisher (Upper Canada) (1792–1874), English-Canadian road builder, land developer, squire, and Etobicoke Township pioneer
- Thomas Henry (illustrator) (1879–1962), also known as Thomas Henry Fisher, English illustrator
- Thomas Cathrew Fisher (1871–1929), Anglican colonial bishop
- Thomas L. Fisher (b. 1941), special effects artist of the 1997 film Titanic
- Thomas Fisher (Guam politician), member of the Legislature of Guam

== See also ==
- Tom Fisher (disambiguation)
- Thomas Fischer (disambiguation)
