= Fiszer =

Fiszer (archaic feminine: Fiszerowa) is a Polish-language transliteration of German surname Fischer. Notable people with this surname include:

- Franciszek Fiszer (1860–1937), Polish socialite
- Stanisław Fiszer (1769–1812), Polish general and Chief of Staff of the Duchy of Warsaw
- Wirydianna Fiszerowa (1761–1826), Polish noblewoman and memoirist
