= Esther Fischer-Homberger =

Swiss medical historian and psychotherapist (1940-2019)

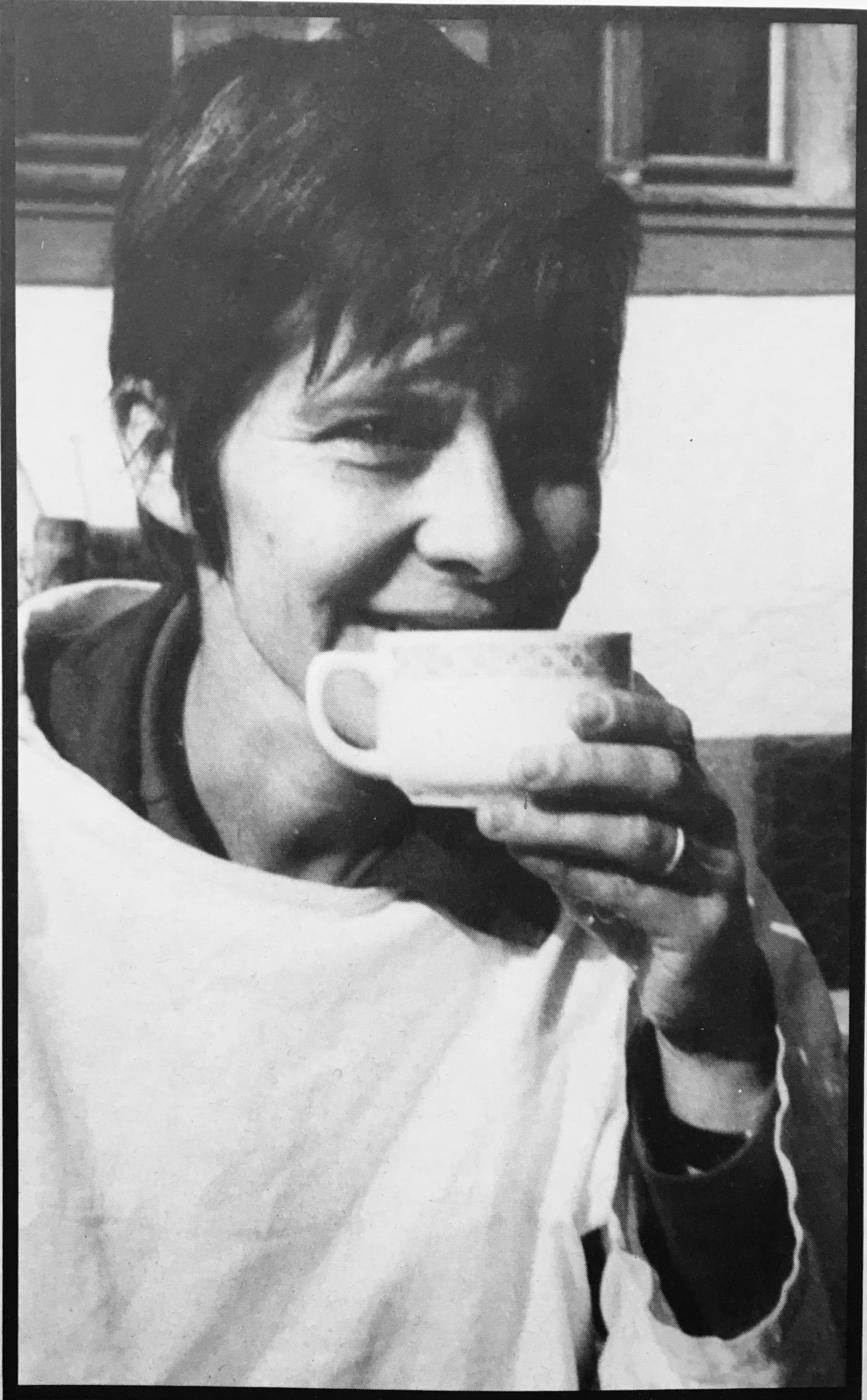
Prof. Dr. Esther Fischer-Homberger

Esther Fischer-Homberger (15 May 1940 – 21 March 2019) was a Swiss psychiatrist and medical historian. Her research focused on the history of psychiatry, psychosomatics and forensic medicine as well as the medical history of women.

== Biography ==
Esther Homberger was born in Affoltern am Albis, Canton Zurich on 15 May 1940. She attended school in Zollikon near Zurich and Basel. Fischer-Homberger completed a medical degree in Neuchâtel and Zurich, her dissertation in psychiatric history being on the topic, "The circular madness".

From 1968 to 1973, she was an assistant at the Medical History Institute of the University of Zurich with Erwin Heinz Ackerknecht. Her habilitation, "The Traumatic Neurosis; From somatic to social suffering" (1975), occurred at the University of Zurich. From 1978 to 1984, she served as the chair for medical history at the University of Bern, from which she resigned in 1984 in favor of going into psychotherapeutic practice. In 1993, she received the diploma as a massage practitioner from the Esalen Institute, California. From 1997, she was a therapist of Katathym-imaginative Psychotherapy. After working as an assistant at the crisis intervention center of the University Psychiatric Services in Bern (KIZ / UPD Bern), she was a specialist in psychiatry and psychotherapy from 2005.

Fischer-Homberger was interested in the psychological and social functionality or dysfunctionality of words and concepts, especially in psychiatric, psychotherapeutic and medical use. Her research focused on the history of psychiatry, psychosomatics and forensic medicine as well as the medical history of women. Her publications and texts were on topics of international theory and feminism. She conducted research regarding Pierre Janet (1849–1947). From 1961 to 2015, she worked for various media as a film reviewer.

Fischer-Homberger was married to Kaspar Fischer (1938-2000) from 1965 to 1988. Their three children were a son, as well as twins, a son and a daughter. Since 1984 she lived with Marie-Luise Könneker, together with her son in the same household in Bern. Fischer-Homberger died on 21 March 2019.

== Selected works ==
- Das zirkuläre Irresein. Juris, Zürich 1968 (Zürcher medizingeschichtliche Abhandlungen, Neue Reihe, Band 53).
- Hypochondrie. Melancholie bis Neurose: Krankheiten und Zustandsbilder. Huber, Bern 1970.
- Die traumatische Neurose. Vom somatischen zum sozialen Leiden. Huber, Bern 1975, ISBN 3-456-80123-8; Psychosozial, Giessen 2004, ISBN 3-89806-275-9.
- Geschichte der Medizin. Springer, Berlin/ Heidelberg/ New York 1975; 2. Auflage ebenda 1977, ISBN 3-540-07225-X.
- "On the Medical History of the Doctrine of Imagination", Psychological Medicine, Vol.9, No.4, (November 1979), pp. 619-628.
- Krankheit Frau und andere Arbeiten zur Medizingeschichte der Frau. Huber, Bern 1979, ISBN 3-456-80688-4.
- Medizin vor Gericht. Gerichtsmedizin von der Renaissance bis zur Aufklärung. Huber, Bern 1983, ISBN 3-456-81282-5.
- Götterspeisen, Teufelsküchen (hrsg. mit Marie-Luise Könneker). Luchterhand, Frankfurt am Main 1990, ISBN 3-630-86732-4.
- Hunger – Herz – Schmerz – Geschlecht. Brüche und Fugen im Bild von Leib und Seele. eFeF, Bern 1997, ISBN 3-905561-14-X.
