= Tom Fisher =

Tom Fisher may refer to:

- Tom Fisher (1960s pitcher) (1942–2016), former Major League Baseball pitcher
- Tom Fisher (1900s pitcher) (1880–1972), Major League Baseball pitcher
- Tom Fisher (The Young and the Restless), a fictional character from the American soap opera The Young and the Restless
- Tom Fisher (footballer) (born 1992), English footballer
- Tom Fisher (actor) (born 1968), English actor
- Tom Fisher (rugby union) (1891–1968), New Zealand rugby union player
- Tom Fisher (mathematician), Cambridge University mathematician and winner of the 2014 Selfridge Prize

== See also ==
- Thomas Fisher (disambiguation)
