= Benjamin Fischer =

Benjamin Fischer may refer to:

- Benjamin Fischer (historian) (born 1946), American historian and intelligence analyst
- Benjamin Fischer (bishop) (born 1978), American Anglican bishop
- Benjamin Fischer (footballer) (born 1980), Swiss-Liechtensteiner footballer
- Benjamin Fischer (politician) (born 1991), Swiss economist and politician

== See also ==
- Benjamin Fisher (disambiguation)
