= Karl Fischer =

Karl Fischer may refer to:

- Karl Fischer (chemist) (1901–1958), German originator of Karl Fischer titration
- Karl Fischer (resistance fighter) (1918–1963), Austrian politician
- Karl Fischer (football coach) (1888–?), Austrian football coach: Pogoń Lwów, Legia Warsaw
- Karl Fischer (leftist) (fl. 1940s), German militant in Left Communism
- Karl Fischer (architect) (1949–2019), Canadian architect
- Karl Fischer (footballer), Estonian footballer
- Karl von Fischer (1782–1820), German architect
- Karl Fischer (actor), Austrian actor known for co-starring in the Donna Leon TV series
- Karl Fischer von Treuenfeld (1885–1946), Generalleutnant of Waffen SS
- Karl Fischer (photographer), German-born Russian photographer
- Karl Fischer (politician) (1893–1940), German communist politician

== See also ==
- Carl Fischer (disambiguation)
