= Decoration for Services to the Liberation of Austria =

Decoration for Services to the Liberation of Austria Ehrenzeichen für Verdienste um die Befreiung Österreichs
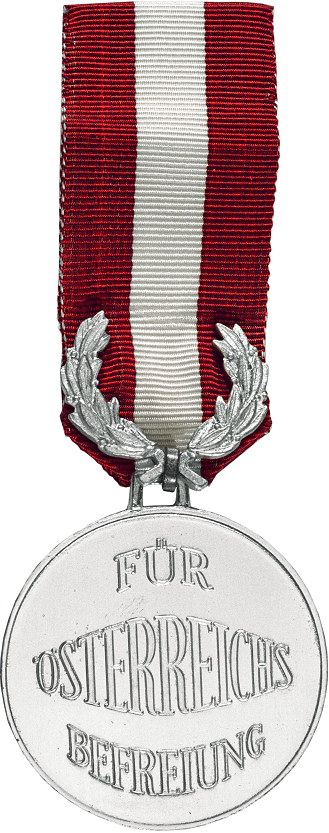
- Type: Decoration
- Awarded for: Active resistance of the Nazi regime and thus contributing to Austria’s liberation from Nazi rule.
- Presented by: Austria
- Eligibility: Austrian citizens
- Ribbon bar of the decoration

Precedence
- Next (higher): Decoration of Honour in Silver
- Next (lower): Decoration of Merit in Gold

The Decoration for Services to the Liberation of Austria (German: Ehrenzeichen für Verdienste um die Befreiung Österreichs) was created by federal law on 27 January 1976. It is a special distinction for men and women who actively resisted the Nazi regime contributing to Austria's liberation from Nazi rule. The President of Austria confers this honour when sent a proposal by the Federal Chancellor based on a report from the Committee on the Austrian Liberation Decoration of Honour.

== Recipients ==
- Karl Fischer
- Maria Fischer
- Bruno Franz Kaulbach

== See also ==
- Honours system in the Republic of Austria
