= Robert Fisher =

Robert Fisher may refer to:

== Politicians ==
- Robert Fisher (MP) (1465–1535), in 1529 MP for Rochester
- Robert F. Fisher (1879–1969), member of the California legislature
- Robert Fisher (Tennessee politician) (1925–1989), American politician expelled from the Tennessee legislature
- Robert Fisher (New Hampshire politician), member of the New Hampshire legislature 2014–2017

== Artists and musicians ==
- Robert Fisher (playwright) (1922–2008), American playwright
- Robert M. Fisher (1928–2007), American artist
- Rob Fisher (British musician) (1956–1999), British keyboardist and songwriter
- Robert Fisher (c. 1957–2017), American vocalist and songwriter from Willard Grant Conspiracy
- Rob Fisher (conductor), American music director, conductor, arranger and pianist

== Others ==
- Robert Fisher (priest) (fl. 1490s–1510s), Canon of Windsor
- Robert Fisher (UK academic) (born 1943), interest in teaching philosophy to children
- Robert Fisher (university president) (born c. 1948), president of Belmont University
- Robert Fisher (journalist) (born 1948/49), Canadian radio and television journalist
- Robert J. Fisher (born 1954), American business manager and director of Gap Inc
- Robert Joseph Fisher (born 1959), American priest of the Catholic Church
- Robert William Fisher (born 1961), American fugitive
- Rob Fisher (motorcyclist) (fl. 1990s), British motorcycle racer
- Rob Fisher (barrister), New Zealand lawyer
- Robert Howie Fisher (1861–1934), Scottish minister

== See also ==
- Bob Fisher (disambiguation)
- Bob Fischer (disambiguation)
- Robert Fischer (disambiguation)
