= Fischl =

Fischl is a surname. Notable people with the surname include:

- Eric Fischl (born 1948), American painter, sculptor and printmaker
- Frank Fischl (1926–2016), American Army officer and politician
- Margaret Fischl, American HIV/AIDS researcher
- Paul Fischl (1888–1960), Austrian footballer
- Peter Fischl (1930–2018), Holocaust survivor, poet and public speaker
- Viktor Fischl (1912–2006), better known as Avigdor Dagan, Israeli writer

Fictional characters with the name include:

- Fischl, a character in 2020 video game Genshin Impact

== See also ==
- Sportzentrum Fischl, a soccer stadium in Klagenfurt
- Fischel
- Fischler
