= Michael Fisher (disambiguation) =

Michael Fisher (1931–2021) was an English physicist.

Michael or Mike Fisher may also refer to:

== People ==
=== Arts and entertainment ===
- Michael Fisher, American screenwriter whose works include the 1968 film Killers Three
- Mike Fisher (died 2025), American musician, who with his brother Roger founded Heart

=== Law and politics ===
- D. Michael Fisher (born 1944), American judge
- Michael Fisher (lawyer) (1946–2015), British lawyer
- Michael J. Fisher, former chief of United States Border Patrol
- Mike Fisher (Kentucky politician), American politician

=== Sports ===
- Mike Fisher (American football) (born 1958), American football player
- Mike Fisher (ice hockey) (born 1980), Canadian ice hockey player
- Mike Fisher (racing driver) (born 1943), American Formula One driver
- Mike Fisher (soccer) (born 1975), American soccer player

=== Other people ===
- Michael Fisher (Anglican bishop) (1918–2003), Brother Michael, bishop suffragan of St Germans
- Michael William Fisher (born 1958), American Catholic bishop
- Michael H. Fisher (born 1950), professor of history

== Fictional characters ==
- Mike Fisher (Only Fools and Horses)

== See also ==
- Michael Fischer (disambiguation)
- Michoel Fisher (1910–2004), Russian rabbi
