= Jean Fischer (disambiguation) =

Jean or Jean-Baptiste Fischer may refer to:

- Jean Fischer (1867–?), French cyclist
- Jean Fischer, Danish engineer
- Batty Fischer (Jean-Baptiste Fischer, 1877–1958), Luxembourg dentist and amateur photographer
- Jean Chrétien Fischer (1713–62), soldier

== See also ==
- Fischer (surname)
