= Franz Fischer =

Franz Fischer may refer to:

- Franz Fischer (cellist) (1849–1918), German cellist and conductor
- Franz Joseph Emil Fischer (1877–1947), German chemist, known for the Fischer-Tropsch process
- Franz Fischer (SS officer) (1901–1989), German military officer and convicted war criminal
- Franz Gottwalt Fischer (1902–1960), German chemist working in organic chemistry
- SS Franz Fischer, a British-built collier

== See also ==
- Franciszek Fiszer (or Franc Fiszer, 1860–1937), Polish bon-vivant and philosopher
- Franz Fischler (born 1946), Austrian politician
