= Thomas Fischer =

Thomas Fischer may refer to:

- Thomas Fischer (professor) University professor at University of Geneva
- Thomas Fischer (actor), cast member of the 1970 German film Hotel by the Hour
- Thomas Fischer (basketball), played on Germany's team in the 2004 Summer Paralympics
- Thomas Fischer (footballer), played for 1. FC Union Berlin 1989–1990
- Thomas Fischer (judge), judge in the Federal Court of Justice in Germany, retired
- Thomas Fischer (IMSAI), American businessman
- Thomas Fischer (skier) (born 1986), German skier
- Thomas Gabriel Fischer (born 1963), Swiss heavy-metal musician
- Thomas Fischer (video game developer), Developed the game BeamNG.drive

== See also ==
- Steven Thomas Fischer (born 1972), American film director, producer, and cartoonist
- Tom and Maureen Fischer, founders of Little Mary's Hospitality House
- Thomas Fisher (disambiguation)
