= Hans Fischer (disambiguation) =

Hans Fischer (1881–1945) was a German organic chemist.

Hans Fischer may also refer to:

- Hans Fischer (painter) (1909–1958), Swiss painter
- Hans Fischer (cyclist) (born 1961), Brazilian cyclist
- Hans Fischer, CEO of Tata Steel Europe
- Hans Fischerkoesen (1896–1973), also known Hans Fischer, German commercial animator

== See also ==
- Hans Vischer
- Hank Fischer (born 1940), pitcher in Major League Baseball
- Hans-Werner Fischer-Elfert (born 1954), German professor of Egyptology
