= Patrick Fischer (disambiguation) =

Patrick Fischer (born 1975) is a Swiss ice hockey coach and former player.

Patrick Fischer may also refer to:

- Patrick C. Fischer (1935–2011), computer scientist and Unabomber target
- Patrick F. Fischer (born 1957), justice on the Ohio Supreme Court
- Pat Fischer (1940–2024), American football player

== See also ==
- Patrick Fischler (born 1969), American actor
