= SS Franz Fischer =

British-built collier (1881–1916)

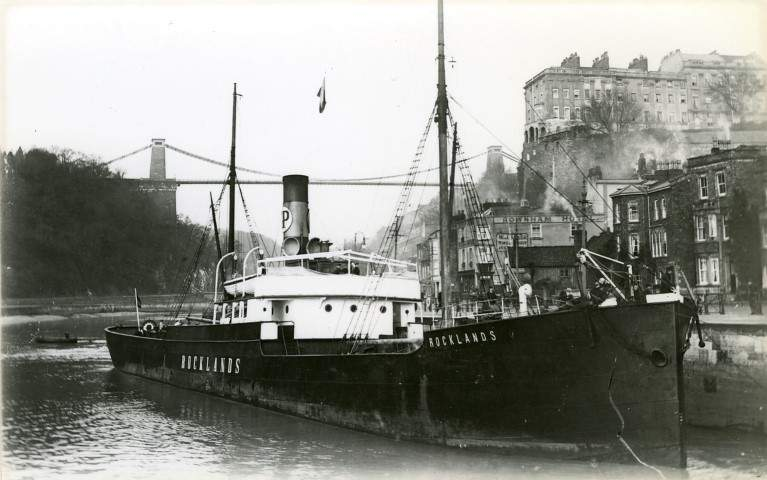
- Rocklands between 1896 and 1913 in Gebr. Petersen colours. She is in Bristol, with Clifton Suspension Bridge in the background.

History
- Name: 1881: Rocklands; 1913: Franz Fischer
- Owner: 1881: Hardy, Wilson & Co; 1895: Robert Hardy & Co; 1896: Gebr. Petersen; 1913: FW Fischer; 1914: UK Admiralty
- Operator: 1914: Everett & Newbigin
- Port of registry: 1881: (United Kingdom) West Hartlepool; 1896: (German Empire) Flensburg; 1913: (German Empire) Rostock; 1914: (United Kingdom) London
- Builder: Irvine & Co, West Hartlepool
- Yard number: 37
- Launched: 10 September 1881
- Completed: October 1881
- Identification: UK official number 84530; 1881: code letters WDBK; 1896: code letters LMJS; 1914: code letters JHVL; pennant number CT-18
- Fate: Sunk by torpedo, 1 February 1916

General characteristics
- Type: collier
- Tonnage: 953 GRT, 603 NRT
- Length: 224.3 ft (68.4 m)
- Beam: 31.5 ft (9.6 m)
- Depth: 12.3 ft (3.7 m)
- Decks: 1
- Installed power: 1881: 99 RHP; 1899: 105 NHP
- Propulsion: 2-cylinder compound steam engine
- Capacity: at least 1,000 tons of coal
- Crew: 16

SS Franz Fischer was an iron-hulled collier that was built in England as Rocklands in 1881, renamed Franz Fischer in 1913, and sunk by enemy action in 1916. She was owned and registered in Britain until 1896, when she passed to German owners. In August 1914 the UK Admiralty seized her and placed her under British civilian management.

On 1 February 1916 a German attack sank Franz Fischer, killing 13 of her 16 crew. German news media claimed that a bomb dropped by a Zeppelin sank her, making her the first merchant ship to be sunk by aerial attack. Research has since disproved this, and established that the U-boat UB-17 sank her.

== Building ==
Irvin & Co built Rocklands as yard number 37 at West Hartlepool on the River Tees, launching her on 10 September 1881 and completing her that October. Her registered length was 224.3 ft (68.4 m), her beam was 31.5 ft (9.6 m) and her depth was 12.3 ft (3.7 m). Her tonnages were 953 GRT, 603 NRT.

She had a two-cylinder compound steam engine built by Thomas Richardson & Sons. It was originally rated at 99 RHP, but by 1899 this had been revised to 105 NHP.

Rocklands' first owners were Hardy, Wilson & Co, who registered her in West Hartlepool. Her UK official number 84530 and her code letters were WDBK.

== Changes of owner and name ==
In 1895 Rocklands' owner was listed as Robert Hardy & Co of West Hartlepool. In 1896 Gebrüder Petersen ("Petersen Brothers") acquired her and registered her in Flensburg in Germany. Her German code letters were LMJS. In 1913 FW Fischer acquired her, renamed her Franz Fischer, and registered her in Rostock.

== Capture ==
In August 1914 the United Kingdom entered the First World War, and the UK Admiralty seized Franz Fischer at Sharpness in Gloucestershire. The Admiralty kept her German name, gave her the pennant number CT-18 and appointed Everett and Newbigin to manage her. She was registered in London and her code letters were JHVL.

== Sinking ==
On 31 January 1916 Franz Fischer left Hartlepool carrying a cargo of 1,020 tons of coal to Cowes in the Isle of Wight. On approaching the Kentish Knock lightvessel off the Essex coast at 9.30pm on 1 February, Franz Fischer was warned of German sea mines on the route ahead and her captain decided to join a group of vessels anchored for the night.

At 10.30 pm there was an explosion amidships aboard Franz Fischer. Franz Fischer appeared only lightly damaged, but the crew prepared to lower her boats in case they had to abandon ship. However, she soon developed a list to port, and capsized and sank two minutes after the explosion. The Belgian steamship Paul saved three of her crew: her British chief engineer and steward, and a Newfoundland seaman. 13 other men initially survived the sinking but died in the water.

== Cause of sinking ==
The German news service the Wolffs Telegraphisches Bureau reported that the ship was sunk by a bomb from a Zeppelin returning from the 31 January – 1 February raid on the English Midlands. Franz Fischer's surviving crew reported hearing a mechanical noise to the southeast just before the explosion, and one described feeling that an aircraft was overhead, lending credence to the claim. She was noted as being the first merchant ship to be sunk by aerial attack and the "first steamship in history whose loss to air attack can be positively confirmed".

All Zeppelins from the raid on England had passed over the area by the time of the sinking except Zeppelin LZ 54 (L 19), which suffered from engine problems. For some time the sinking was attributed to her. However, historians from Historic England reconstructed L 19's last movements before she was wrecked in the North Sea later on 1 February 1916, and note that she was too far north to have sunk Franz Fischer. An alternative theory at the time and since was that she was sunk by a German bomber flying from Zeebrugge.

The Historic England investigation concludes that the German U-boat UB-17 actually sank Franz Fischer. The U-boat's logs note she fired two torpedoes at a ship at Kentish Knock on the night of the sinking. The first missed but the crew claimed a hit by the second. The sound of the first torpedo, which was a misfire, may explain the noises heard by the crew of the Franz Fischer before the explosion. The official British history of the First World War at sea attributes the sinking to UB-17.

== Legacy ==
The writer Alfred Noyes told the story of the sinking of Franz Fischer in The Times as "Open Boats". A radio dramatisation was made and this was also serialised in The New York Times.
