= Carl Fischer =

Carl Fischer may refer to:

- Carl Fischer (actor) (1876–1953), Danish actor
- Carl Fischer (baseball) (1905–1963), American baseball player
- Carl Fischer (homeopath) (died 1893), New Zealand doctor, homoeopath and viticulturist
- Carl Fischer (tennis) (1901–1985), American tennis player from the 1920s and 30s
- Carl Fischer (photographer) (1924–2023), American art director and photographer
- Carl Fischer (trumpeter), American trumpeter, trombonist and saxophonist of the Billy Joel Band
- Carl Anthony Fisher (1945–1993), Roman Catholic bishop
- Carl G. Fisher (1874–1939), American entrepreneur
- Carl H. Fischer (1907–2005), American floriculturalist
- Carl T. Fischer (1912–1954), Native American jazz pianist and composer
- Carl Fischer Music, American music publishing company

== See also ==
- Karl Fischer (disambiguation)
