= Horní Benešov =

- Town
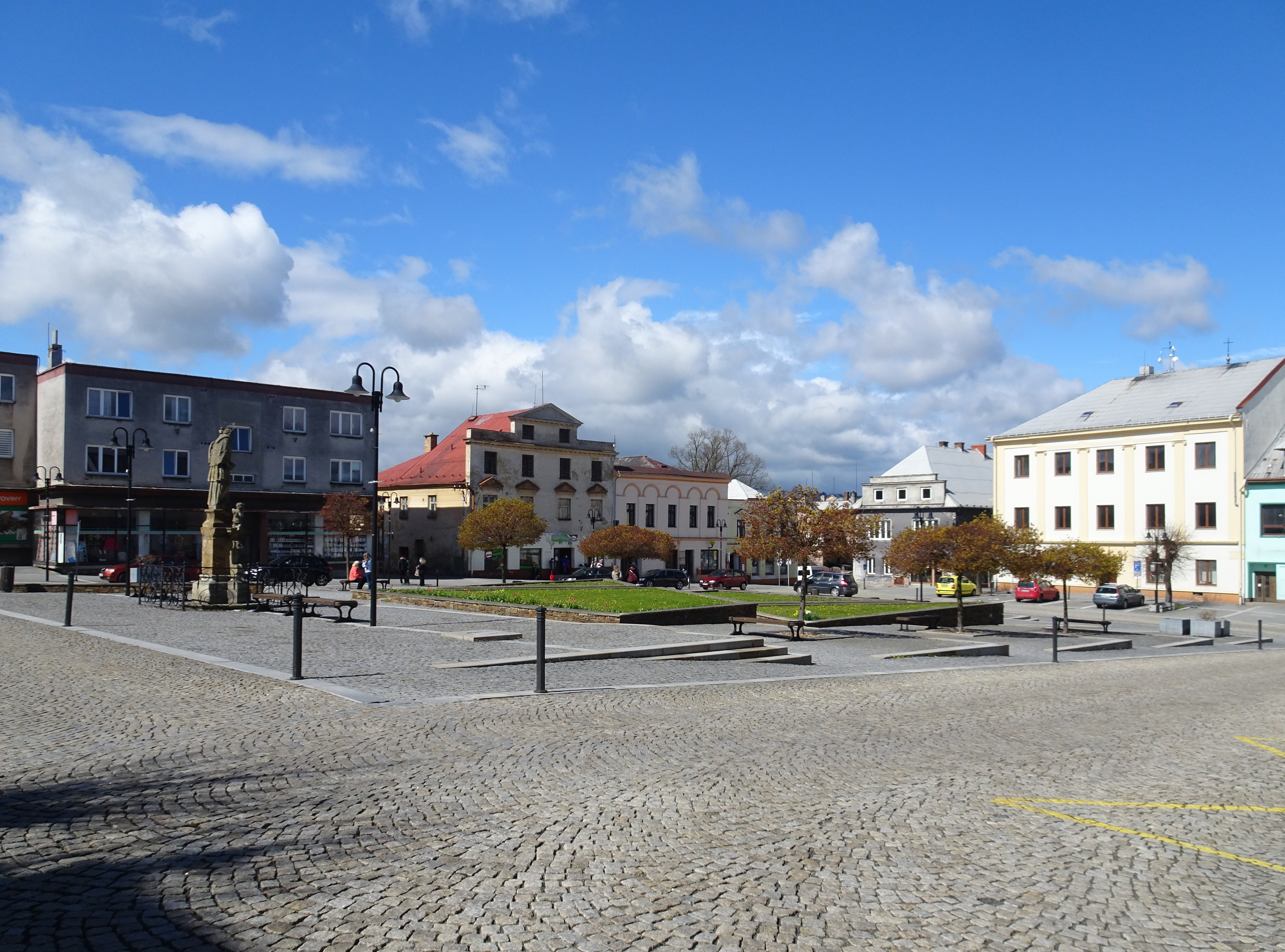
- Mírové Square

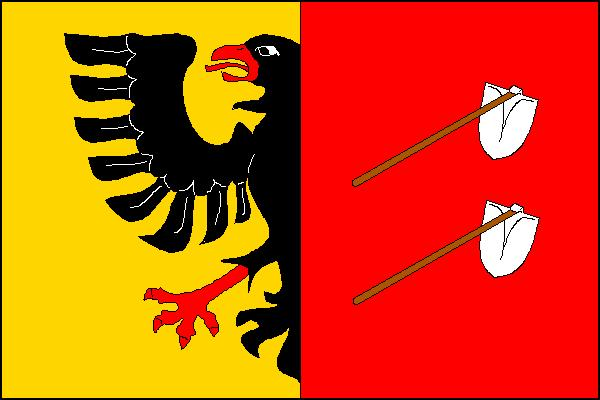
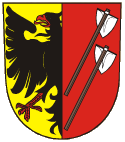
- Flag Coat of arms

- Location in the Czech Republic
- Coordinates: 49°58′0″N 17°36′10″E
- Country: Czech Republic
- Region: Moravian-Silesian
- District: Bruntál
- First mentioned: 1226

Government
  - Mayor: Pavel König

Area
  - Total: 20.40 km^{2} (7.88 sq mi)
- Elevation: 568 m (1,864 ft)

Population (2026-01-01)
  - Total: 2,214
  - Density: 108.5/km^{2} (281.1/sq mi)
- Time zone: UTC+1 (CET)
  - Summer (DST): UTC+2 (CEST)
- Postal code: 793 12
- Website: www.hbenesov.cz

Horní Benešov (Czech pronunciation: [ˈɦorɲiː ˈbɛnɛʃof]; until 1926 Benešov; German: Bennisch) is a town in Bruntál District in the Moravian-Silesian Region of the Czech Republic. It has about 2,200 inhabitants. The town is located in the Nízký Jeseník range.

Horní Benešov had a long mining tradition, but it ended at the end of the 20th century.

== Administrative division ==
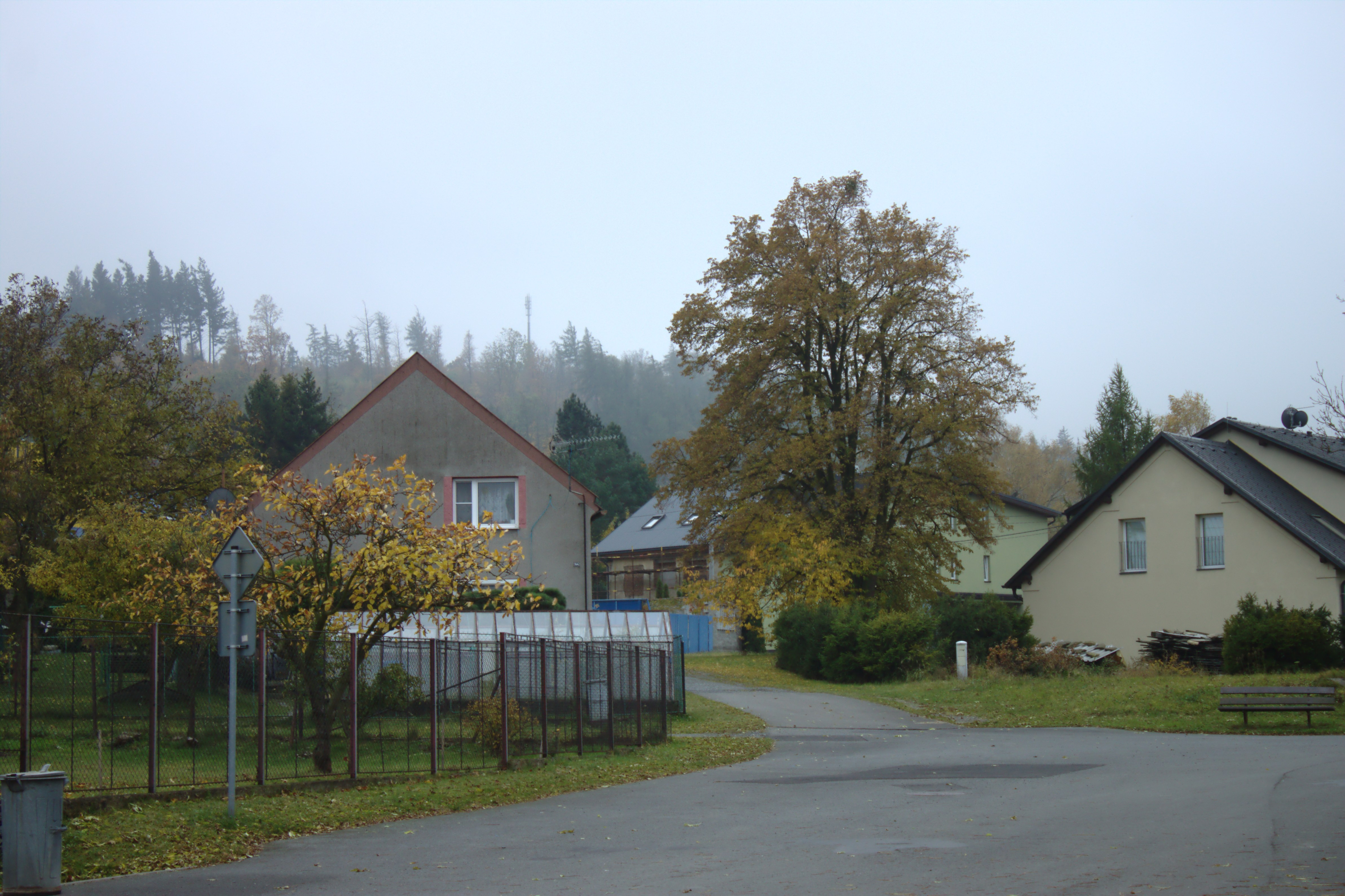
Luhy village

Horní Benešov consists of two municipal parts (in brackets population according to the 2021 census):

- Horní Benešov (1,861)
- Luhy (315)

== Geography ==
Horní Benešov is located about 10 kilometres (6 mi) east of Bruntál and 20 km (12 mi) west of Opava. It lies in the Nízký Jeseník range. The highest point is at 619 m (2,031 ft) above sea level. The Čižina Stream flows next to the town.

== History ==
The first written mention of Horní Benešov is from 1226, when it was a mining settlement. The silver mines were one of the oldest in Czech lands. The town of Benešov was founded on the site of the settlement in 1253, and the town rights were confirmed in 1271 by King Ottokar II.

The town was destroyed by a Hungarian invasion in 1474 and then during the Thirty Years' War. The mining was in decline since 17th century. During the 19th and 20th centuries, economic development of Benešov was driven mostly by textile industry.

According to the Austro-Hungarian administration census of 1910, the town had 3,826 inhabitants, 3,800 (99.9%) were German-speaking. Most populous religious groups were Roman Catholics with 3,766 (98.4%), followed by Protestants with 30 (0.8%) and the Jews with 25 (0.6%).

Before World War I, the town was part of the Austrian Silesia region. After World War I, the town was within the state of Czechoslovakia and in 1926 was given its present name. From 1938 to 1945, Horní Benešov was annexed by Nazi Germany and administered as a part of the Reichsgau Sudetenland. After the war, the German-speaking population was expelled.

In 1902–1914 and in 1951–1992, baryte was mined here.

== Demographics ==
Historical population

Year	Pop.	±%
1869	4,256	—
1880	4,200	−1.3%
1890	4,442	+5.8%
1900	4,367	−1.7%
1910	3,826	−12.4%

Year	Pop.	±%
1921	3,376	−11.8%
1930	3,409	+1.0%
1950	1,727	−49.3%
1961	2,199	+27.3%
1970	2,499	+13.6%

Year	Pop.	±%
1980	2,631	+5.3%
1991	2,602	−1.1%
2001	2,483	−4.6%
2011	2,299	−7.4%
2021	2,176	−5.4%

Source: Censuses

== Transport ==
The I/11 road (the section from Opava to Bruntál) runs through the town.

== Sights ==
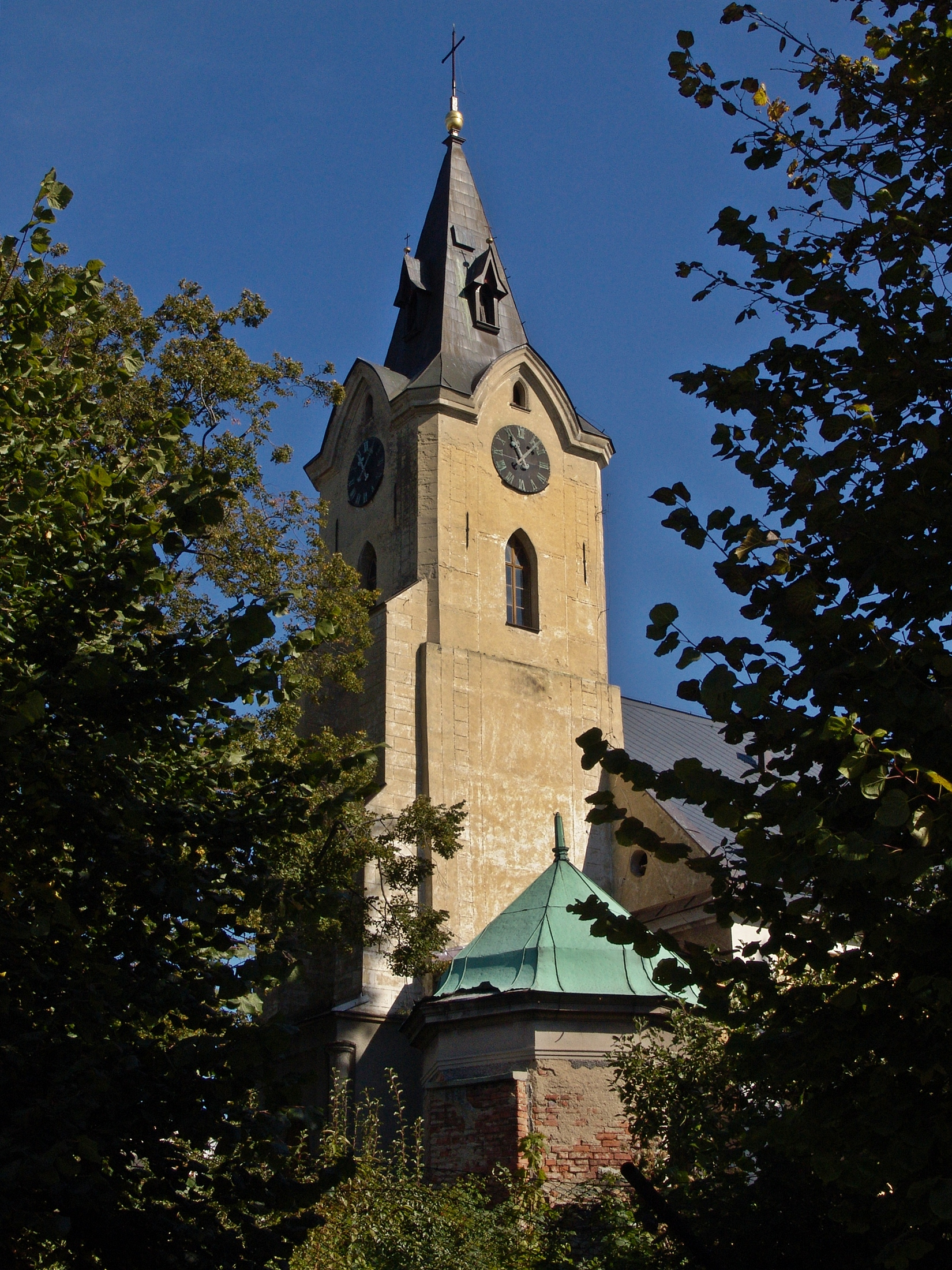
Church of Saint Catherine

The main landmark of Horní Benešov is the Church of Saint Catherine. It was built in the Neoclassical style in 1719. It has preserved elements from the original building from the 16th century.

== Twin towns – sister cities ==
Horní Benešov is twinned with:

- Pszów, Poland
