= Bernd Fischer =

Bernd Fischer may refer to:

- Bernd Fischer (mathematician) (1936–2020), German mathematician
- Bernd Fischer (football coach) (1939–2025), German football coach and manager
- Bernd Jürgen Fischer (born 1952), historian and professor of history at Indiana University-Purdue University Fort Wayne
