= Werner Fischer (disambiguation) =

Werner Fischer (1939–2025), was a German academic and engineer

Werner Fischer may refer to:

- Werner Fischer (crystallographer) (1931–2026), German mineralogist
- Werner Fischer (sailor) (1940–2011), Austrian sailor
