= Lisker's sign =

- Differential diagnosis: deep vein thrombosis

Lisker's sign is a clinical sign in which there is tenderness when the front, middle (anteromedial) part of the tibia is percussed. It can be found in people who have deep venous thrombosis.
