= Theodor Fischer (disambiguation) =

Theodor Fischer (1862–1938), was a German architect.

Theodor Fischer may refer to:

- Theodor Fischer (auctioneer), Swiss art dealer and auctioneer
- Theodor Fischer (fencer), German Olympic épée and foil fencer
