= Robert Fischer =

Robert Fischer may refer to:

- Robert Fischer (unionist) (1883–1945), German unionist and social democratic politician
- Robert Fischer (Canadian politician) (1937–2020), Canadian politician, member of the Legislative Assembly of Alberta
- Bobby Fischer (1943–2008), American chess grandmaster and chess world champion between 1972 and 1975
- Robert Fischer (actor) (1881–1973), German actor featured in The Wiser Sex, Zaza and They Raid by Night
- Robert Fischer (author) (born 1960), German author, see Bernhard Wicki
- Robert Fischer (football) (fl. 1930s), Austrian football manager of RC Strasbourg and Racing Club de Paris
- Robert Fischer (judge) (1911–1983), German judge, president of the Federal Court of Justice of Germany from 1968 till 1977
- Robert Fischer (rugby union), German rugby player, see 2008–09 Rugby-Bundesliga squads
- Robert Fischer (soldier), German soldier awarded the Knight's Cross of the Iron Cross
- Robert Fischer, character in the film Inception
- Bob Fischer, American philosopher

== See also ==
- Robert Fisher (disambiguation)
- Bob Fisher (disambiguation)
- Bob Fischer (disambiguation)
