= Fritz Fischer =

Fritz Fischer may refer to:

- Fritz Fischer (historian) (1908–1999), German historian
- Fritz Fischer (medical doctor) (1912–2003), Waffen-SS doctor
- Fritz Fischer (biathlete) (born 1956), German biathlete
- Fritz Fischer (physicist) (1898–1947), Swiss physicist
