= Paul Fischer =

Paul Fischer may refer to:

- Paul Fischer (footballer) (1882–1942), German footballer
- Paul Fischer (luthier) (born 1941), British maker of musical instruments
- Paul Fischer (German painter) (1786–1875), German painter
- Paul Fischer (sailor) (1922–?), German Olympic sailor
- Paul Fischer (sportsman) (1881–?), German athlete and gymnast
- Paul A. Fischer (1921–2007), member of the Alaska Senate
- Paul Gustav Fischer (1860–1934), Danish artist
- Paul Henri Fischer (1835–1893), French physician, zoologist and paleontologist

== See also ==
- Paul Fisher (disambiguation)
