= Emil Fischer (bass) =

German opera singer (1838–1914)

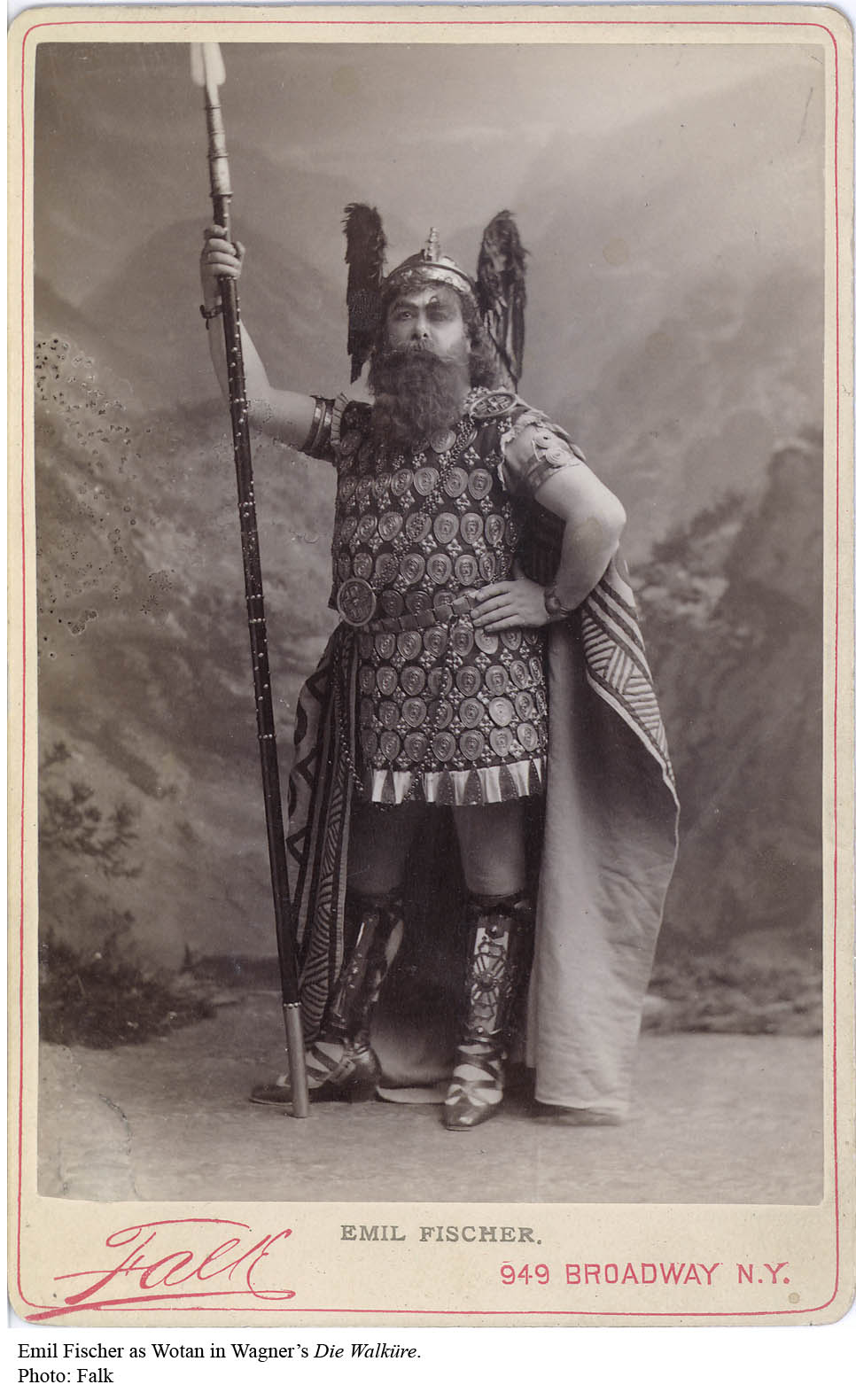
Fischer as Wotan in Die Walküre, 1889 (photo by Benjamin Falk)

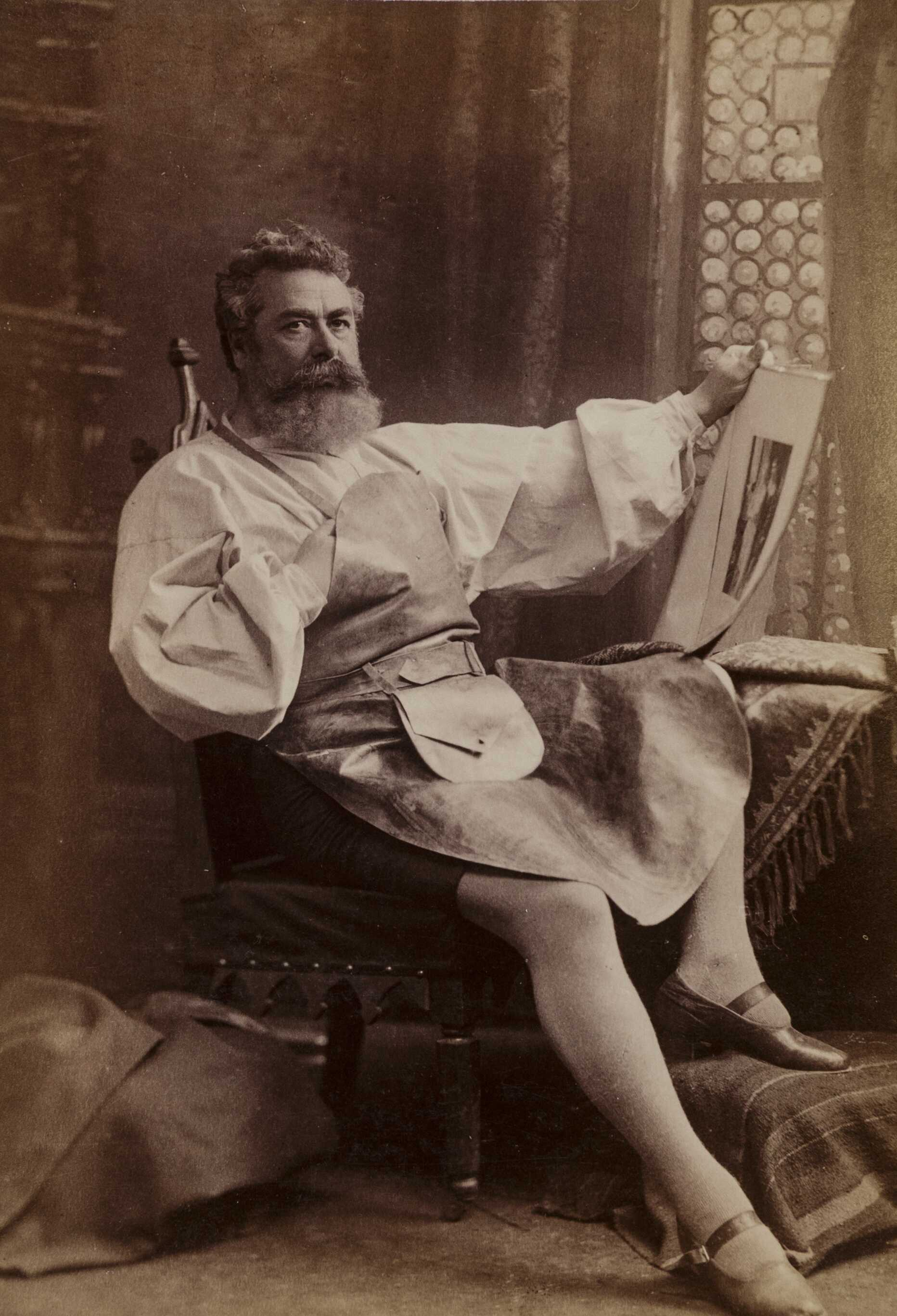
Fischer as Hans Sachs in Die Meistersinger von Nürnberg, 1886 (photo by Benjamin Falk; Newberry Library, Chicago)

Emil Fischer (German: [ˈeːmiːl ˈfɪʃɐ]; June 13, 1838 - August 11, 1914), was a German dramatic bass or bass-baritone, born in Braunschweig. His parents were Friedrich and Caroline Fischer-Achten, both opera singers.

He made his début in 1857 in Graz in Boieldieu's Jean de Paris. After that, he filled various engagements in Pressburg, Stettin, and Brauschweig. From 1863 to 1870, he was director of the opera at Danzig.

From 1875 to 1880, Fischer sang in Rotterdam, and from 1880 until 1885 in Dresden. The period from 1885 to 1891 at the Metropolitan Opera House, New York City, marks the culmination of his artistic triumphs. Lilli Lehmann, Max Alvary, and Marianne Brandt performed there with him. More than only creating the bass roles in Richard Wagner's later Musikdramas, as far as America is concerned, he firmly established his reputation as a Wagner interpreter equalled by very few. From 1895 until 1897, he performed in several American cities as a member of Walter Damrosch's German Damrosch Opera Company. He appeared once more, and for the last time, at the Metropolitan Opera House in 1907. Fischer died in Hamburg at the beginning of World War I. He left no known recordings of his voice.
