= Gustav Fischer =

Gustav Fischer may refer to:

- Gustav Fischer (explorer) (1848–1886), German explorer of Africa
- Gustav Fischer (equestrian) (1915–1990), Swiss equestrian
- Gustav Fischer (politician), American politician

== See also ==
- VEB Gustav Fischer Verlag, a subsidiary (based in Jena, Germany) of international publishing conglomerate Elsevier
