= Nisker =

Nisker is a surname. Notable people with the surname include:

- Merrill Nisker (born 1966), Canadian electronic musician better known as Peaches
- Wes Nisker (1942–2023), American author, radio commentator, and comedian
