= Bob Fisher (Australian footballer) =

Australian rules footballer (1929–2021)

Personal information
- Full name: Robert Neil Fisher
- Born: 14 March 1929
- Died: 28 August 2021 (aged 92)
- Original team: Ashburton
- Height: 175 cm (5 ft 9 in)
- Weight: 80 kg (176 lb)

Playing career^{1}
| Years | Club | Games (Goals) |
| 1948–50 | Hawthorn | 28 (6) |
- ^{1} Playing statistics correct to the end of 1950.

Robert Neil Fisher (14 March 1929 – 28 August 2021) was an Australian rules footballer who played with Hawthorn in the Victorian Football League (VFL).
