= Gerhard Fischer =

Gerhard Fischer may refer to:

- Gerhard Fischer (architect) (1890–1977), Norwegian architect
- Gerhard Fischer (bobsleigh), German Olympic bobsledder
- Gerhard Fischer (diplomat) (1921–2006), German diplomat and Gandhi Peace Prize laureate
- Gerhard Fischer (inventor) (1899–1988), American inventor, contributed to the development and popularity of the hand-held metal detector
- Gerhard Fischer (professor) (born 1945), German-born American professor, Center for LifeLong Learning and Design (L3D), University of Colorado, Boulder
