= Jan Fischer =

Jan Fischer may refer to:

- Jan Fischer (politician) (born 1951), former Prime Minister of the Czech Republic
- Jan Fischer (Czech actor) (1921–2011), Czech Jewish actor and theatre director
- Jan Fischer (rower), German rower
- Johann Bernhard Fischer von Erlach (or Jan Fischer z Erlachu, 1656–1723), Austrian architect
