= Adam Fischer =

Adam Fischer may refer to:

- Adam Fischer (sculptor) (1888–1968), Danish sculptor
- Ádám Fischer (born 1949), Hungarian conductor

== See also ==
- Ádám Somlai-Fischer (born 1976), Hungarian architect and artist
- Adam Fisher (disambiguation)
