= Adam Fisher (baseball) =

American baseball executive

- Education: Harvard University
- Occupation: Baseball executive
- Writing career
- Language: English

Adam Fisher is an American baseball executive.

== Early life ==
Fisher grew up in Lexington, Massachusetts. He attended Lexington High School, where he starred in baseball and organized and participated in charity sports events. He studied American history at Harvard University, where he wrote a senior thesis on Jackie Robinson, graduating in 2001.

== Career ==
Prior to working with the Atlanta Braves as assistant general manager, Fisher worked for the New York Mets as senior director of baseball operations. He is known for having expertise in both classical scouting and sabermetrics. In 2013, Fisher and other young baseball executives with Ivy League backgrounds were profiled by Newsday. In 2015, he was included in an ESPN.com story about promising baseball executives.

Fisher has been credited, among others, with uncovering statistics that led to the Mets' interest in Daniel Murphy.
