= Vera Fischer =

Vera Fischer may refer to:

- Vera Fischer (actress) (born 1951), Brazilian actress
- Vera Fischer (mathematician), Austrian mathematician
- Vera Fischer (sculptor) (1925–2009), Croatian Jewish sculptor
