= Jack Fischel =

American historian (born 1937)

Jack R. Fischel (born 1937) is an American academic. Fischel was a professor of history at Millersville University of Pennsylvania, where he lectured for 37 years.

== Education and career ==
Fischel was born in Brooklyn, New York City in 1937. After "seven years of night classes", he graduated from Hunter College with a B.A. in 1955. In 1965 he earned a master's degree from the University of Delaware and in the same year began teaching at Millersville University. He received his Ph.D. from the University of Delaware in 1973. He became chair of the history department at Millersville in 1985, and remained chair until retiring in 2003.

== Books ==
Fischel is the author of:

- The Holocaust (Greenwood, 1998)
- Historical Dictionary of the Holocaust (Rowman & Littlefield, 1999; 2nd ed., Scarecrow Press, 2010)
- The Holocaust and Its Religious Impact (with Susan M. Ortmann, Praeger, 2004)

He is the editor of:

- Jewish-American History and Culture: An Encyclopedia (edited with Sanford Pinsker, Garland, 1992)
- Encyclopedia of Jewish American Popular Culture (2008)
