= Jason Fischer =

Jason Fischer may refer to:

- Jason Fischer (fighter) (born 1985), American mixed martial artist
- Jason Fischer (politician) (born 1983), American politician from Florida
- Jason Fischer (writer), Australian author of fiction
