= David Fischel =

British businessman

- Born: David Andrew Fischel; 1 April 1958 (age 68)
- Occupation: Businessman
- Years active: 1969–present
- Title: Chief Executive of Intu Properties plc
- Term: 2001–2019
- Successor: Matthew Roberts

David Andrew Fischel (born 1 April 1958) is a British businessman. He was formerly the chief executive of Intu Properties Group plc, a British shopping centre management and development company between 2001 and 2019.

== Early life ==
Fischel qualified as a chartered accountant with Touche Ross & Co in 1983.

== Career ==
Fischel was chief executive of Intu (formerly CSC) from 2001 to 2019. Fischel joined CSC subsidiary Liberty International in 1985, and was finance director since 1988 and managing director since 1992. He has been a director of Regency Centers Corporation since 4 January 2011. He was a non-executive director of Intu from 20 April 2012 to 26 April 2019.
