= Henry A. Fischel =

American rabbi and academic

Henry A. Fischel (November 20, 1913 – March 20, 2008) was a German born-American professor emeritus of Near Eastern languages and cultures at Indiana University. Fischel was an influential figure in founding the Jewish Studies Program at Indiana University. Under his direction, the Lilly Endowment gave the university a grant in 1972–73 to develop a Jewish Studies Program. Professor Fischel lived in Bloomington, Indiana until his death in 2008.

== Biography ==
He was born in Bonn in 1913. Heinz Albert Fischel was born to parents Anna and Adolf. His father was a shoemaker. As a child in Bonn, he enjoyed playing chess, soccer, tennis, and also competitive boxing. He also was a talented pianist. He completed a degree in rabbinical studies at the Hochschule für Wissenschaft des Judentums in Berlin, and was enrolled as a student at the University of Berlin at the same time. After the Kristallnacht Pogrom, the Nazis imprisoned him at the Sachsenhausen concentration camp. He received his degree in rabbinical studies from the Hochschule in 1939. He was awarded a PhD from the University of Edinburgh in 1945. He took a position at Brandeis University in 1958, and then accepted a position to join the faculty at Indiana University in 1961. He was predeceased by his wife Sylvia, who died in 1987. He was survived by five grandchildren and five great-grandchildren at his passing.

== Literary works ==
Rabbinic Literature and Greco-Roman Philosophy: A Study of Epicurea and Rhetorica in Midrash (Leiden, 1973).

- – Essays in Greco-Roman and Related Talmudic Literature, ed. by Henry A. Fischel, (New York: KTAV Publishing, 1977)
- – "Story and History: Observations on Greco-Roman Rhetoric and Pharisaism." Denis Sinor, editor. American Oriental Society, Middle West Branch, Semi-Centennial Volume. Bloomington, IL; 1969; pp. 59–78.
- ---. Story and History: Observations on Greco-Roman Rhetoric and Pharisaism. In Henry Fischel, editor. Essays in Greco-Roman and Related Talmudic Literature. New York: Ktaw; 1977; pp. 443–472
- --"Studies in Cynicism and the Ancient Near East: the Transformation of a Chria." In Religions in Antiquity: Essays in Memory of Erwin Ramsdell Goodenough 372–411. 1968. Leiden.
- ---. "The Uses of Sorites (Climax, Gradatio) in the Tannaitic Period." Hebrew University College Annual. 1973; 44:119–151.
- --- The First Book of . Fischel, Henry A. (Henry Schocken Books, 1948.
