= Kurt Fischer =

Kurt Fischer is the name of:

- Kurt Fischer (politician, born 1900) (1900–1950), German politician
- Kurt Fischer (politician, born 2000), German politician
- Kurt Joachim Fischer (1911–1979), German journalist, film critic, and screenwriter
- Kurt Rudolf Fischer (1922–2014), Jewish-Austrian philosopher
- Kurt W. Fischer (1943–2020), American professor of education

== See also ==
- Kurt von Fischer (1913–2003), Swiss musicologist and classical pianist
- Curtis Fischer (1921–1991), American football coach for whom Fischer Field Stadium in Newton, Kansas, is named
