= Psychosomatics =

- Discipline: Psychosomatic medicine
- Language: English
- Edited by: T.A. Stern

Publication details
- History: 1960-present
- Publisher: Elsevier on behalf of the Academy of Psychosomatic Medicine
- Frequency: Bimonthly
- Impact factor: 1.660 (2010)

Standard abbreviations
- ISO 4: Psychosomatics

Indexing
- CODEN: PSYCBC
- ISSN: 0033-3182 (print); 1545-7206 (web)
- LCCN: 65029473
- OCLC no.: 01763070

Links
- Journal homepage; Online access; Online archive

Psychosomatics is a peer-reviewed medical journal that focuses on psychosomatic medicine. It was established in 1960, during William S. Kroger's tenure as head of the Academy of Psychosomatic Medicine. It is published by Elsevier on behalf of the Academy of Psychosomatic Medicine.

== See also ==
- Psychoneuroimmunology
