= Leni Fischer =

German politician (1935–2022)

Member of the Bundestag
- In office 1976–1998

Personal details
- Born: 18 July 1935 (age 90) Haltern, West Germany (now Germany)
- Died: 2 March 2022 in Rheine
- Party: CDU

Leni Fischer (18 July 1935 in Haltern, West Germany – 2 March 2022 in Rheine) was a German politician of the Christian Democratic Union (CDU) and former member of the German Bundestag.

== Life ==
Fischer was a member of the German Bundestag from 1976 to 1998. She had always entered parliament via the North Rhine-Westphalia state list. In the Bundestag she dealt mainly with foreign, defence and development policy issues.
