= Bob Fischer =

Bob Fischer may refer to:

- Bob Fischer (broadcaster) (born 1972), English broadcaster
- Bob Fischer (philosopher), American philosopher

== See also ==
- Bobby Fischer, chess grandmaster
- Bob Fisher (disambiguation)
- Robert Fisher (disambiguation)
- Robert Fischer (disambiguation)
