= Arthur Fisher (Australian sportsman) =

Australian cricketer

Personal information
- Full name: Arthur Donnelly Wentworth Fisher
- Born: 14 December 1882; Lavender Bay, New South Wales, Australia
- Died: 9 July 1968 (aged 85); Neutral Bay, New South Wales, Australia
- Batting: Right-handed
- Bowling: Right-arm fast-medium

Domestic team information
- Years: Team
- 1903/04–1907/08: New South Wales
- Source: ESPNcricinfo, 28 December 2016

Arthur Donnelly Wentworth Fisher (14 December 1882 – 9 July 1968) was an Australian sportsperson who represented New South Wales in both cricket and rugby union. He was the great-grandson of the politician William Wentworth.

== Sporting career ==
Fisher played three first-class cricket matches for New South Wales, two in the 1903–04 season and a final match in 1907–08. He played club cricket for the university and North Sydney clubs. He made his senior debut for New South Wales against the touring England Test side, taking the wicket of Tom Hayward and recording a pair.

Fisher played for Sydney Church of England Grammar School in the Great Public Schools rugby competition. He later played club rugby for Sydney University from 1901. Fisher was the club's leading try-scorer in 1904 and 1906. He was selected twice for New South Wales in 1904.
