= Tom and Maureen Fischer =

Thomas & Maureen Fischer are the founders of Little Mary’s Hospitality House, which is one of the world’s only free vacation resort ministries for families with children battling life-threatening, debilitating, or terminal illness. The couple lives in Wellston, Michigan, which is also the site of the ministry venue they established in 1982.

The couple are past recipients of the Amway Good Neighbor award, presented to them for their work in ministry to critically ill children from all over the United States and as far away as Jamaica, the Netherlands, and Romania.

== Published works ==
- Maureen Fischer, Little Mary (East Eagle, 1985, 106 ppg.), ISBN 0-9605738-3-6
- Maureen Fischer, Little Mary’s Cookbook (Little Mary’s, 1997, 20 recipes)
