= Friedrich Fischer (disambiguation) =

Friedrich Fischer (1849–1899), was a German inventor.

Friedrich Fischer may refer to:

- Friedrich Fischer (athlete) (1908–1994), Austrian long-distance runner
- Friedrich Ernst Ludwig von Fischer (1782–1854), Russian botanist
