= Arthur Fischer =

Arthur or Artur Fischer may refer to:

- Arthur Fischer (actor) (1897–1991), Swedish actor
- Arthur Fischer (footballer), manager of 1. FC Lokomotive Leipzig
- Artur Fischer (1919–2016), German inventor
- Arthur Fischer, mathematician who worked with Vincent Moncrief

== See also ==
- Arthur Fisher (disambiguation)
