= Oskar Fischer (disambiguation) =

Oskar Fischer (1876–1942) is a Czech scientist. It may also refer to:

- Oskar Fischer (politician) (1923–2020), German politician
- Oskar Fischer (footballer) (1929–2003), Austrian football player
