= Benjamin Fischer (politician) =

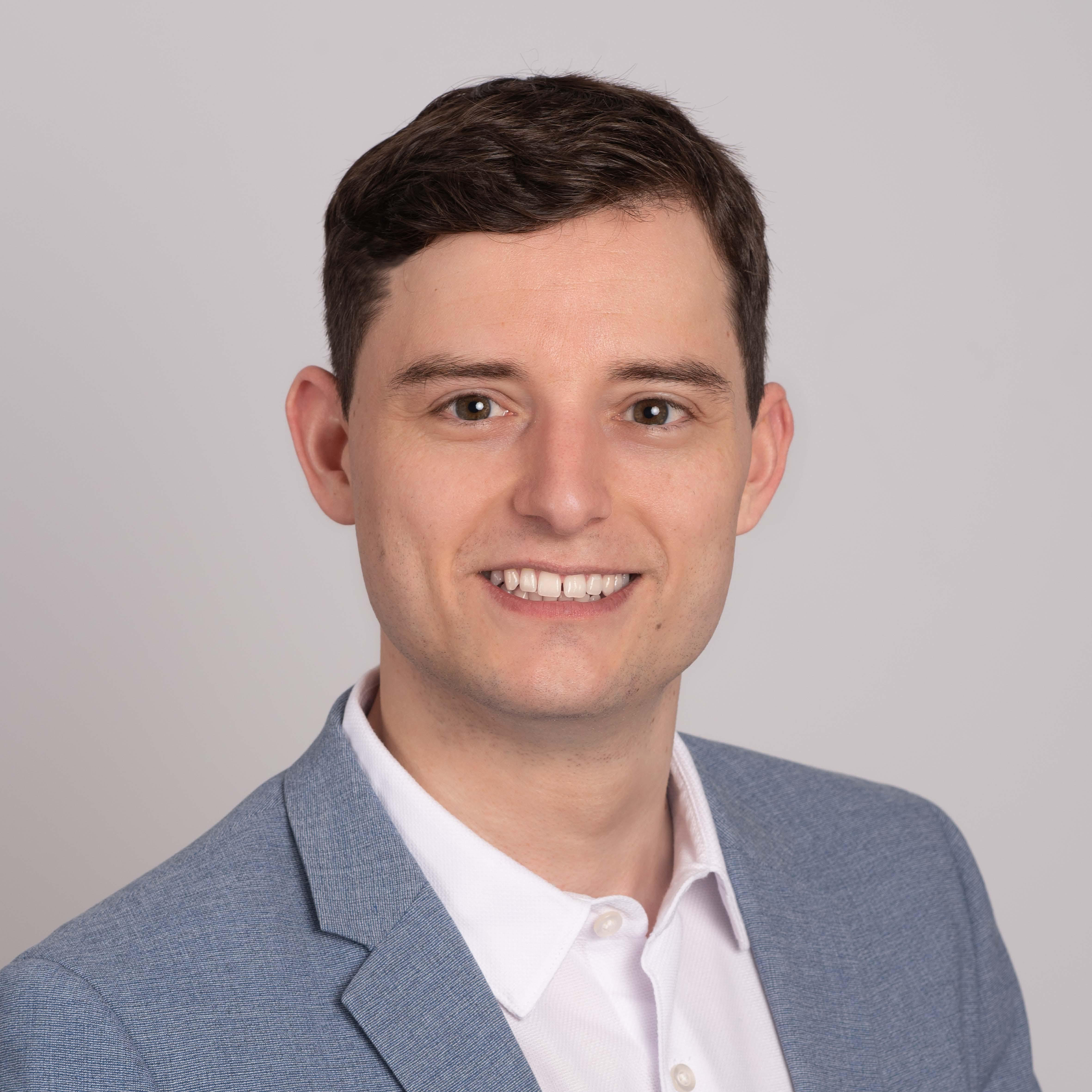
- Official portrait, 2023

Member of the National Council (Switzerland)
- Incumbent
- Assumed office 28 February 2022
- Constituency: Canton of Zürich

Personal details
- Born: Benjamin Fischer; 16 August 1991 (age 35) Uster, Switzerland
- Spouse: Nicole Fischer
- Children: 3
- Education: ZHAW (BSc); HWZ (MSc)
- Website: Official website Parliament website

Military service
- Allegiance: Switzerland
- Branch/service: Swiss Armed Forces
- Years of service: 2009 – present

Benjamin "Beni" Fischer (German: [ˈbɛnjaˌmiːn ˈfɪʃɐ]; born 16 August 1991) is a Swiss economist and politician who currently serves on the National Council (Switzerland) for the Swiss People's Party since 2022. He previously served on the Cantonal Council of Zürich, where he was elected as youngest member in the Uster electoral district, between 2015 and 2022. He concurrently served as president of the Young SVP from 2016 to 2020.
