= Moses Fischer =

Rabbi in Austrian Empire (1756–1833)

Personal life
- Born: c. 1756 Prague, Bohemia
- Died: c. 1833 Eisenstadt, Hungary, Austrian Empire
- Children: Marcus Fischer
- Parent: Meir Fischels (father)
- Occupation: Rabbi

Religious life
- Religion: Judaism

Moses Fischer (c. 1756 – c. 1833) was an Austrian rabbi. He was active in the Haskalah movement in Prague.

== Biography ==
Moses Fischer was born in Prague to Meir Fischels, a wealthy Talmudic scholar and a descendent of Judah Loew ben Bezalel.

Fischer was active in the Haskalah movement in Prague, and was a member of the Gesellschaft der jungen Hebräer. In addition to Talmud, Fischer studied philosophy and mathematics, and was praised for his proficiency in logic and Hebrew grammar by Moses Mendelssohn, with whom he corresponded. Together with Raphael Joel, Fischer in 1790 signed a petition to allow Jews to serve in the military, prioritizing it over meticulous religious observance.

Fischer later transitioned to Orthodoxy, and served as an unofficial rabbi and mashgiach in Vienna from 1816. In 1827 or 1829, he relocated to Eisenstadt, a nearby town, where he died around 1833.

His son was the historian Marcus Fischer.
