= Karl Fischer (resistance fighter) =

Austrian resistance fighter

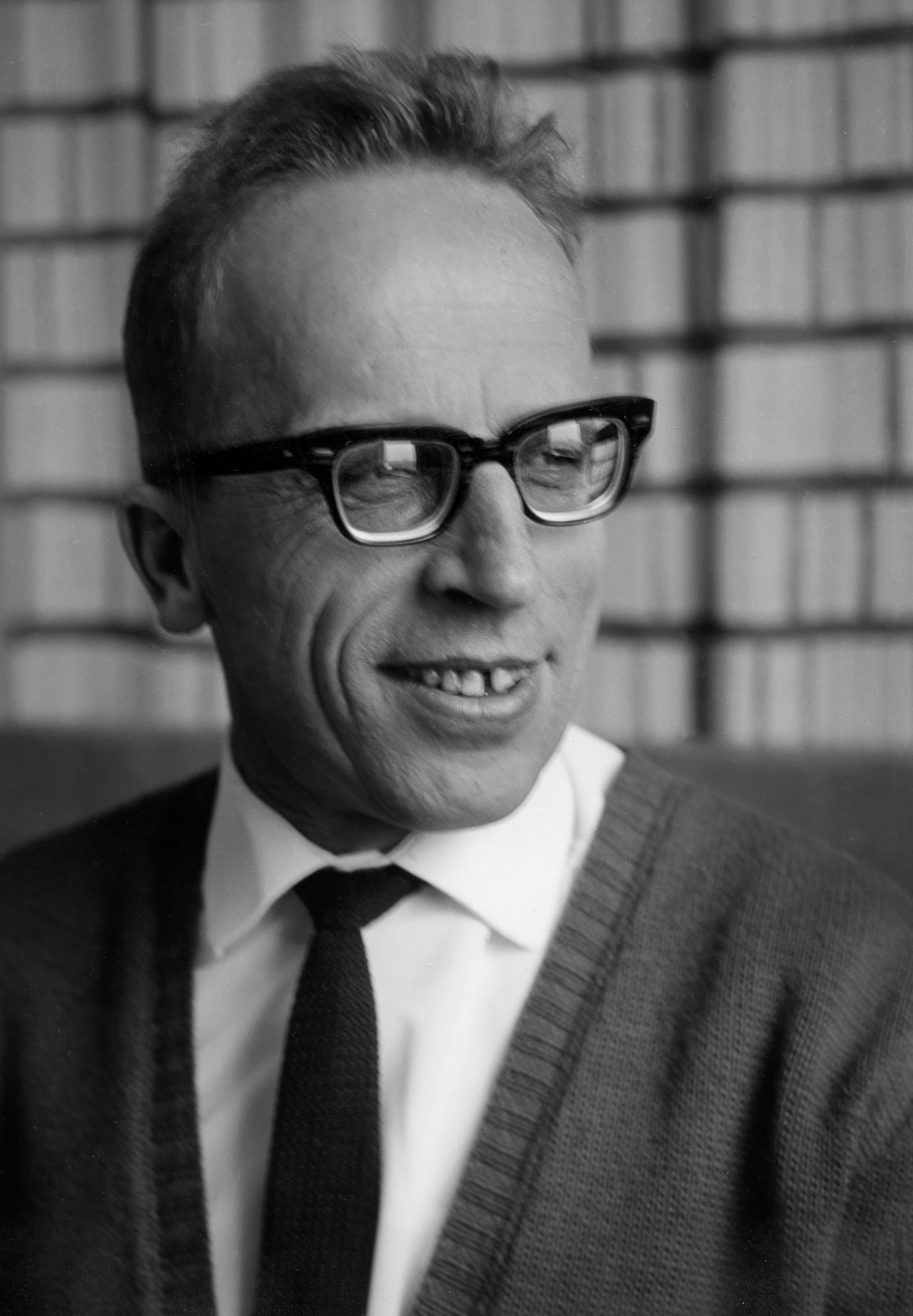
Karl Fischer in 1962

Karl Fischer (1918–1963) was an Austrian resistance fighter against the Austro-fascist state between 1934—1938 and the Nazi state as of 1938. Fischer was a Trotzkyan communist, whose anti-Stalin leanings led in 1947 to his long-term, illegal imprisonment in Soviet gulags. He was freed with the Austrian "Staatsvertrag", treaty with the WWII allies in 1955, and returned to Austria, where he lived until his death. Fischer died at age 44 from consequences of his imprisonment in KZ Buchenwald and Soviet gulags. In 2013 Fischer was finally fully rehabilitated, as his convictions in the Austro-fascist stare had not had a legal basis for such step during his lifetime. That basis was created in 2012. Today, Fischer is used as a "moral" reference point in parts of the Socialdemocratic Party of Austria.

== Late award ==
In 2020, he and his mother Maria Fischer (1897–1962), who had also been a resistance fighter, were posthumously awarded the Decoration for Services to the Liberation of Austria by the President of Austria Alexander Van der Bellen. The Decoration for Services to the Liberation of Austria is a special award for people who actively resisted the Nazi regime and thus contributed to Austria's liberation from Nazi rule.
