= Eduard Fischel =

German journalist (1826–1863)

- Born: 1826; Danzig, Prussia
- Died: 7 July 1863 (aged 36–37); Paris, Second French Empire
- Occupations: Journalist, political writer
- Writing career
- Notable works: Die Despoten als Revolutionäre (1859); Die Verfassung Englands (1862)

Eduard Fischel (Note: Fischel's surname is given as "Falk" by the Jewish Encyclopedia.) (1826 – 7 July 1863) was a German publicist and political writer.

== Biography ==
Eduward Fischel was born into a Jewish family in Danzig in 1826. Originally inclined towards a career in commerce, he later shifted his focus to academic pursuits. After passing his matriculation examination at the gymnasium, he enrolled in legal studies at the University of Berlin, where he earned his degree in 1858. He then joined the state service as an assessor while simultaneously embarking on a career as a journalist for the Magdeburger Zeitung.

Fischel authored several pamphlets addressing contemporary issues. Notably, in 1859, he penned Brennus-Zug und Moskoviterthum, Ein Mahnruf an das deutsche Volk, advocating Austria's stance against Napoleon III. On the suggestion of the Duke of Coburg, who took a great interest in his writings, Fischel revised and expanded this pamphlet, releasing it as Die Despoten als Revolutionäre.

He later went to Paris to prepare for a new work centered on the evolution of political law in European states since the French Revolution, with the goal of afterward entering an academic career. Tragically, he met his end in the French capital when he was run over by an omnibus on rue Royale.

== Publications ==
- De coniugum iure Germanico debitis (in Latin). Berlin: A. Sacco. 1853.
- Brennus-Zug und Moskoviterthum, Ein Mahnruf an das deutsche Volk. Berlin: W. Adolf & Co. 1859.
- Die Despoten als Revolutionäre. Berlin: F. Schneider. 1859. Published in English as Despots as Revolutionists (London, 1860).
- Preußens Aufgabe in Deutschland: Rechtsstaat Wider Revolution. Berlin: Haude & Spener. 1859.
- Deutsche Federn in Oesterreich's Doppeladler. Berlin: Haude & Spener. 1860.
- Gallischer Judaskuß. Antwort auf Edmond About's Schrift: Preussen im Jahre 1860. Berlin: Haude & Spener. 1860.
- The Frontier of the Rhine and the Meeting at Baden-Baden. Newcastle: A. Carr. 1860.
- Der entlarvte Palmerston. Berlin: Haude & Spener. 1860. Published in English as Palmerston Unmasked (London, 1860).
- Männer und Maßregeln: Ein politische Skizze. Berlin: J. Springer. 1861. A defense of self-government.
- Die Verfassung Englands. Berlin: F. Schneider. 1862. Published in Russian as Государственный строй Англии (St. Petersburg, 1862), in English as The English Constitution (London, 1863), in French as La constitution d'Angleterre (Paris, 1864), and in Italian as Storia della costituzione inglese (Milan, 1866).
