= Ignjat Fischer =

Croatian architect

- Born: 18 June 1870; Zagreb, Austro-Hungarian Monarchy, (now Croatia)
- Died: 19 January 1948 (aged 77); Zagreb, SFR Yugoslavia
- Occupation: Architect
- Buildings: Parliament of Croatia

Ignjat Nathan Fischer (18 June 1870, Zagreb – 19 January 1948, Zagreb) was a Croatian architect who was active in Zagreb during the first half of the 20th century.

== Early life and education ==
Fischer was born in Zagreb to a Croatian-Jewish family. His father Samuel was a prominent construction engineer. Fischer studied in Vienna and Prague.

== Career ==
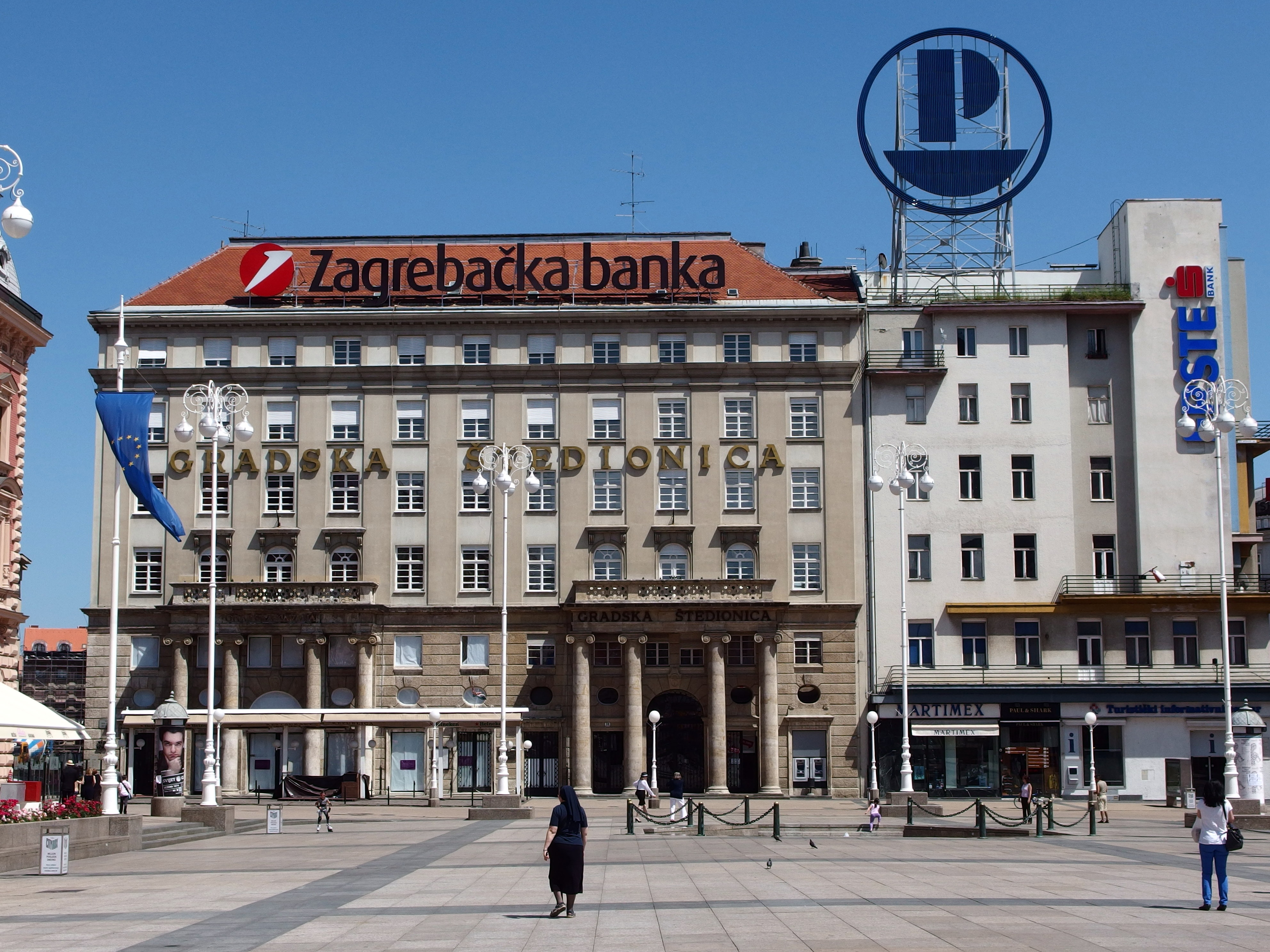
City Savings bank palace (on the left) in Ban Jelačić Square; designed by Fischer (1922–1925)

In his early stage he was one of the major architects who introduced the Vienna Secession in Croatian architecture. During that phase he created several impressive designs, such as a house Rado at Strossmayer Square 7 in 1897, sanatorium in Klaićeva Street known for its V-based ground plan in 1908, and the building of the deanery and the institute of pathology at the Medical Faculty of Šalata in 1912.

During the Interwar period, Fischer designed in the spirit of late modernism, historicism and, modestism. His greatest achievements are the forestry Academy building in Mažuranić Square 5 in 1920, the head office of City Savings Bank of Zagreb on Ban Jelačić Square in 1922–1925 (upgraded in 1931), and modern house Arko at Dolac Market.

The full extent of Fischer's work is not known with certainty. Recent research discovered a number of architectural designs that were previously not attributed to him, most notably the building of the Croatian Parliament in the St. Mark's Square. In Zagreb, he had a large studio where he designed up to forty different buildings.

== Personal life ==
Fischer was a member of Croatian Freemasonry. He was married to Helena (née Egersrodfer) with whom he had two daughters, Ivana and Marija Magdalena. Events before and during World War II affected his health. His daughter Ivana recalled that her "father was imprisoned even when he was 70 years old, because he was a Jew. As a result of those persecutions he became seriously ill and died in 1948." Fischer was buried at the Mirogoj Cemetery.

== See also ==
- Ivana Fišer (daughter)

== Bibliography ==
- Goldstein, Ivo (2005). Židovi u Zagrebu 1918 – 1941. Zagreb: Novi Liber. ISBN 953-6045-23-0.
- Bagarić, Marina (2011). Arhitekt Ignjat Fischer. Zagreb: Meandarmedia. ISBN 978-953-735-576-0.
- Snješka Knežević, Aleksander Laslo (2011). Židovski Zagreb. Zagreb: AGM, Židovska općina Zagreb. ISBN 978-953-174-393-8.
