= Caroline Fischer-Achten =

Austrian opera singer (1806–1896)

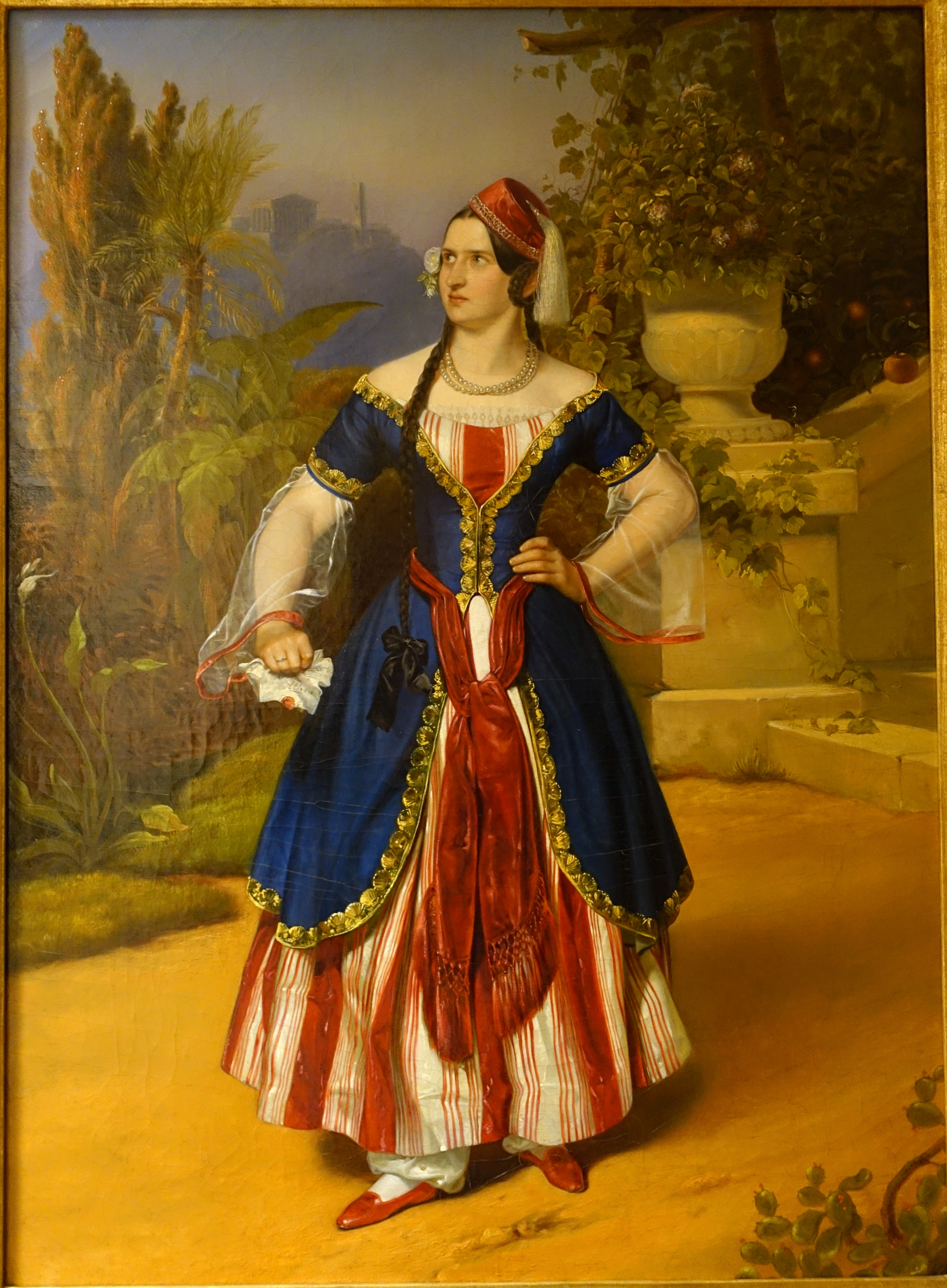
Fischer-Achten as Constanze in Mozart's Die Entführung aus dem Serail; oil painting by G. A. Barthel

Caroline Fischer-Achten (29 January 1806 – 13 September 1896) was an Austrian operatic soprano. She appeared at the Royal Court Theatre in Vienna, and toured Germany.

== Life ==
She was born in Vienna in 1806, daughter of Anton Achten, a civil servant. She had singing lessons from her father and later from Aloysia Weber, Mozart's sister-in-law. In 1827 she first appeared at the Vienna Court Theatre.

She married in 1830 Friedrich Fischer (1805–1871), a bass singer, whom she met at the Court Theatre. With her husband she toured Germany, appearing at opera houses in Stuttgart, Karlsruhe, Frankfurt and Braunschweig.

Fischer-Achten's roles included Pamina in Mozart's The Magic Flute, Alice in Meyerbeer's Robert der Teufel (Robert le diable), Mathilde in Rossini's William Tell and Zerline in Auber's Fra Diavolo.

From 1853 the couple lived in Friedensheim near Graz, where she died in 1896.

Three sons of the couple became opera singers: Ludwig Fischer-Achten (1837–1891), a tenor; Emil Fischer (1838–1914), a bass-baritone; and Karl Fischer (1840–1883), a bass-baritone.
