= Jan Fišer =

Czech architect, designer and university professor

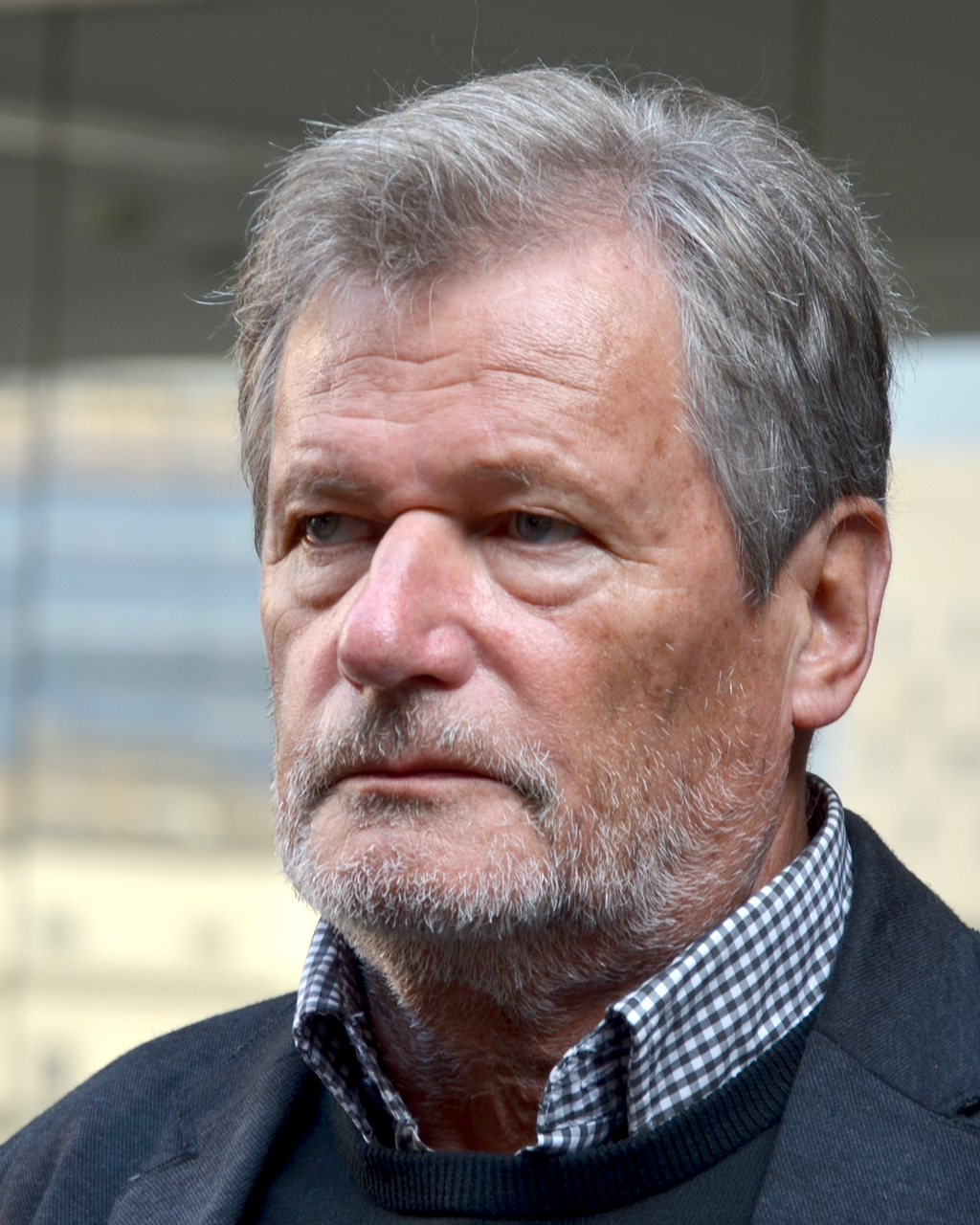
- Jan Fišer in 2018
- Born: 7 October 1944 (age 81); Prague, Protectorate of Bohemia and Moravia
- Occupations: architect, professor, designer
- Years active: 1971–

Jan Fišer (born 7 October 1944) is a Czech architect, designer, and university professor.

== Biography ==
Fišer was born in Prague on 7 October 1944. In 1971 he graduated from the Academy of Arts, Architecture and Design in Prague in the studio of architecture under the guidance of Professor Josef Svoboda. After graduating, he joined Spojprojekt in Prague, where he worked until 1978, when he began working for the Czech Fine Arts Fund. He runs his studio within the Institute of Design at the Faculty of Architecture of the Czech Technical University in Prague and the Studio of Interior Design at the Jan Evangelista Purkyně University in Ústí nad Labem. Its realizations include the reconstruction of the Olympic and Ypsilon theatres, the building of Generali Česká pojišťovna in Prague 1 or the interior of the restaurant in Palác Zdar in Ústí nad Labem. He was one of the authors of the interiors of the Transgas building complex. He is the co-author of the book Transgas, where he wrote a chapter on the interiors of this complex of buildings.

His son Daniel is also an architect and until 2018 he worked in the architectural studio Zaha Hadid Architects in London.
