= Adolf Fischer =

Adolf Fischer may refer to:

- Adolf Fischer (actor) (1900–1984), German actor
- Adolf Fischer (officer) (1893–1947), Generalmajor in the Wehrmacht
- Adolph Fischer (1858–1887), labor activist
