= Ed Fishel =

NSA Cryptologist and writer (1914-1999)

Edwin C. Fishel

Personal details
- Born: December 19, 1914 Alliance, Ohio
- Died: February 11, 1999 (Aged 84) Arlington, Virginia
- Resting place: Arlington National Cemetery
- Education: Mount Union College

Military service
- Branch/service: United States Army
- Battles/wars: World War II

Edwin Clark "Ed" Fishel was a lifelong artist, historian, war correspondent, and magazine editor for the National Security Agency. He was notable for his tenure as the director and senior editor of Cryptologic Spectrum, which was eventually merged into the Cryptologic Quarterly. He was also the director of the press at the National Cryptologic School (now University), and senior editor of the NSA Technical Journal. He wrote a book which is considered a definitive history of military intelligence during the US Civil War. He was also directly involved in the core advisory panel during the Senate debate over the creation of a National Historical Intelligence Museum.

Alongside his career in the United States Intelligence Community, he was also a well known as a jazz pianist, and was a cofounding member of a jazz band called the Tuesday Nooners Jazz Band (TNJB), which was a jazz band composed entirely of US Government cryptologists. He was also a member of the Bull Run Blues Blowers jazz band and the Band From Tin Pan Alley. He was the first-serving musical director and for some time served as president of the Potomac River Jazz Club. He was also involved in the club's newsletter, Tailgate Ramblings. He was a member of the Cosmos Club.

== Early life and career as a journalist ==
Fishel was born in Alliance, Ohio in 1914. He graduated Mount Union College in 1936.

== World War II ==
In January 1941, Fishel left his hometown of Alliance, Ohio, for Washington, D.C., intending to use his experience as a ham radio operator to obtain a commission in the Army Signal Corps. Instead, he was drafted a few months later. His service record noted his completion of a cryptology course, and in early 1942 he was assigned to the Signal Intelligence Service (SIS) in Washington. At the time, he had been stationed at the Fifth Corps headquarters in Columbus, Ohio, and his application to the SIS was approved by Colonel Parker Hitt, the Corps’ signal officer.

Fishel was sent to the Signal Corps school at Fort Monmouth, New Jersey, where his class was trained under the supervision of Corporal Lambros Callimahos, who later became a prominent cryptologist. Callimahos was responsible for leading the class to and from their lessons and for conducting early morning inspections of their barracks.

In the summer of 1942, a group of 24 enlisted men transferred from Fort Monmouth to Arlington Hall, the headquarters of the Signal Intelligence Service. Personnel at Arlington Hall were often selected based on their performance on the Army General Classification Test, administered to all new inductees. Admission to the Army's cryptologic training program required a minimum score of 135 out of 162, placing candidates in the top 0.1 percent of the Army. As their security clearances were still pending, they were temporarily assigned to perimeter guard duty at the site, which at that time was unfenced. This group collectively holding enough graduate degrees to average two per man, and informally became known as the "Ph.D. Guard." Two members of this cohort, Arthur Levenson and Sydney Jaffe, were later inducted into the National Security Agency's Cryptologic Hall of Honor.

== Career as musician ==
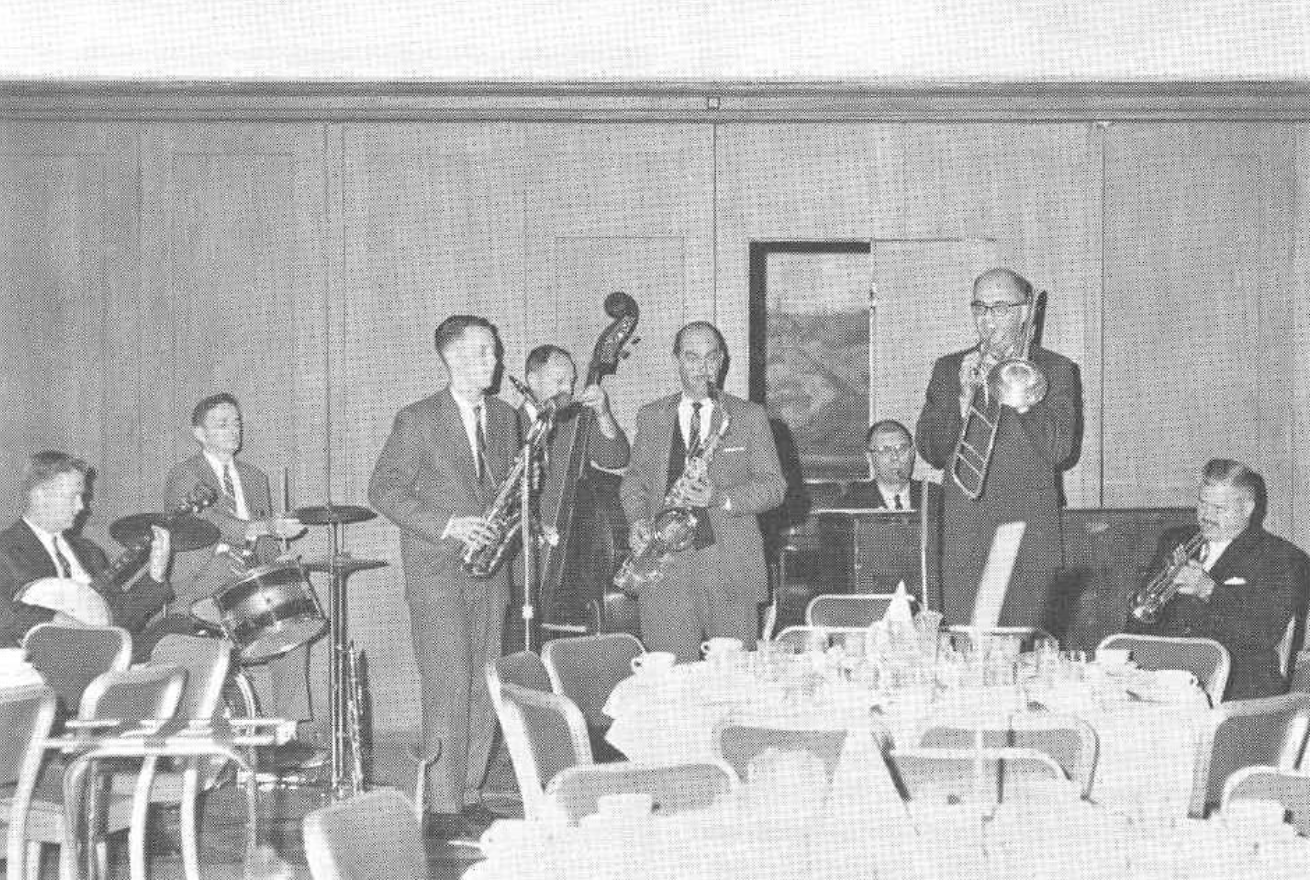
The Tuesday Nooners Jazz Band was a Dixieland jazz band made up entirely of NSA cryptologists. Fishel, one of the two cofounders of the group, is seen here playing the piano.

Fishel began performing music publicly in his youth, playing his first concert for money at a Catholic church in Harrisburg, Ohio, in late 1931, shortly after his seventeenth birthday. While a student at Mount Union College in Alliance, Ohio, he organized a band and wrote arrangements for other ensembles.

His early musical activity was interrupted by professional obligations in journalism. While attending college, he worked for the Cleveland Press, and after graduation he became a city hall reporter for a local newspaper. The demands of that position led him to step away from music for several years.

In 1941, following his draft into the U.S. Army, Fishel resumed musical performance while stationed in Arlington, Virginia, where he cofounded the Tuesday Nooners Jazz Band alongside another cryptology student named Jake Gurin.

From that point onward, he was active in the Washington, D.C., jazz community. Over time, he transitioned from playing piano in small groups to directing ensembles.

During the 1970s, Fishel created and held monthly jam sessions, which led to the creation of several local jazz bands. As the first musical director of the Potomac River Jazz Club, he created a regular Sunday night performance series for local groups and compiled a directory of area musicians. When he officially retired from government service in 1972, he was playing with multiple bands on a near-nightly basis.

== Books ==
- The Secret War for the Union: The Untold Story of Military Intelligence in the Civil War (1996)
