= Ludwig Fischer (disambiguation) =

Ludwig Fischer (1905–1947) was a Nazi war criminal

Ludwig Fischer may also refer to:

- Ludwig Fischer (racing driver) (1915–1991), German racing driver
- Ludwig Fischer (botanist) (1828–1907), Swiss botanist
- Ludwig Fischer (bass) (1745–1825), German opera singer
- Ludwig Hans Fischer (1848–1915), Austrian landscape painter and etcher
