= Michael Fischer =

Michael Fischer may refer to:

- Michael J. Fischer (born 1942), computer scientist
- Michael M. J. Fischer, professor of anthropology
- Mike Fischer (active from 1973), British physicist and businessman

== See also ==
- Michael Fisher (disambiguation)
