= Hermann Fischer =

Hermann Fischer may refer to:

- Hermann Fischer (athlete) (1912–1984), German wrestler and Communist resistance fighter
- Hermann Fischer (banker) (1873–1940), German banker, member of the 4th German Reichstag (Weimar Republic)
- Hermann Fischer (general) (1894–1968), Generalleutnant in the Wehrmacht during World War II
- Hermann Emil Fischer (1852–1919), German chemist
- Hermann Otto Laurenz Fischer, German American chemist
- Hermann Willibald Fischer (1896–1922), German mechanical engineer and assassin
