= Mathias Fischer =

Mathias Fischer may refer to:

- Mathias Fischer (basketball) (born 1971), German basketball player and coach
- Mathias Fischer (footballer) (born 1998), French footballer
