= Fischler =

Fischler is a German Jewish surname. Notable people with the surname include:

- Abraham S. Fischler (1928–2017), American academic
- Claude Fischler (born 1947), French social scientist
- Franz Fischler (born 1946), Austrian politician
- Georg Fischler (born 1985), Austrian luger
- Patrick Fischler (born 1969), American character actor
- Stan Fischler (born 1932), American historian, broadcaster, author and professor
- Willy Fischler (born 1949), Belgian theoretical physicist

== See also ==
- Fischler–Susskind mechanism
