= Paul Fiser =

American football coach (1908–1978)

Biographical details
- Born: February 10, 1908; Shawnee, Oklahoma, U.S.
- Died: June 25, 1978 (aged 70)
- Education: Arkansas College

Coaching career (HC unless noted)
- 1931: Harding
- c. 1930s: Danville HS (AR)
- c. 1930s: Batesville HS (AR)

Head coaching record
- Overall: 4–3 (college)

Accomplishments and honors

Awards
- Arkansas Tech Hall of Distinction (1974)

Paul Idell Fiser (February 10, 1908 – June 25, 1978) was an American football coach. He was the head coach at Harding College for one season in 1931, compiling a record of 4–3, after which the school shut down the program until 1959.

The student body of Harding College was happily taken with their new coach in 1931, and wrote to him via the Harding yearbook, the Petit Jean:

"Fiser is just the man to develop Harding's athletic program. He has won a place in our hearts and we hope he may be with us again next year - if not, Paul, good luck!"

Fiser played college football at Arkansas College (now known as Lyon College) in Batesville, Arkansas.

Fiser later taught at Arkansas Tech University in Russellville, Arkansas, where he served as a physical education instructor in the naval cadet program and was supervisor of the dining hall.

== Head coaching record ==
=== College ===
Year	Team	Overall	Conference	Standing	Bowl/playoffs
Harding Bisons (Independent) (1931)
1931	Harding	4–3			
Harding:		4–3			
Total:		4–3			
