= Ivana Fišer =

Croatian-Jewish conductor

- Born: 13 June 1905; Zagreb, Austro-Hungarian Empire, (now Croatia)
- Died: 7 September 1967 (aged 62); Zagreb, SFR Yugoslavia
- Education: University of Zagreb
- Occupation: Conductor
- Relatives: Ignjat Fischer (father)

Ivana Fišer (born Fischer; June 13, 1905 – September 7, 1967) was known as a Croatian-Jewish conductor.

== Background ==
Fišer was born in Zagreb on June 13, 1905, into the family of the well-known Jewish Croatian architect Ignjat Fischer and his wife Helena (née Egersdorfer).

She attended elementary and music schools in Zagreb. Fišer graduated from the Academy of Music, University of Zagreb, under Fran Lhotka as the first female conductor in Croatia. Soon afterwards she left for Salzburg, where she further refined her skills at the Mozarteum University of Salzburg.

From 1931 to 1934, Fišer worked as violinist with the Croatian Music Institute orchestra. As a conductor, Fišer debuted in 1933 while directing the comic opera Bastien und Bastienne with the Zagreb Philharmonic Orchestra.

From 1939 to 1941, she led the Zagreb Red Cross orchestra. Until 1941, she also led the Osijek philharmonic orchestra.

From 1947 to 1965, Fišer worked as a prompter at the Croatian National Theatre in Zagreb.

== Bibliography ==
- Knežević, Snješka; Laslo, Aleksander (2011). Židovski Zagreb. Zagreb: AGM, Židovska općina Zagreb. ISBN 978-953-174-393-8.
- Macan, Trpimir (1998). Hrvatski biografski leksikon, 4. svezak: E - Gm. Zagreb: Leksikografskog zavoda Miroslav Krleža. ISBN 953-6036-19-3.
- Bagarić, Marina (2011). Arhitekt Ignjat Fischer. Zagreb: Meandarmedia. ISBN 978-953-735-576-0.
