= Hans-Werner Fischer-Elfert =

German professor of Egyptology (born 1954)

Hans-Werner Fischer-Elfert (abbreviated Hans-W.; born 2 September 1954) is a German professor of Egyptology at the Institut für Ägyptologie, University of Leipzig, Germany. He received his Ph.D, written under the direction of Prof. Wolfgang Helck, from the University of Hamburg. He notably took part in the writing of the Lexikon der Ägyptologie. His researches focus on ancient Egyptian literature, religion, medicine and magic.

== See also ==
- List of Egyptologists
