= List of people associated with Wolfson College, Oxford =

A list of people associated with Wolfson College, Oxford. This includes former students, Fellows and Presidents of the college.

== Former students ==
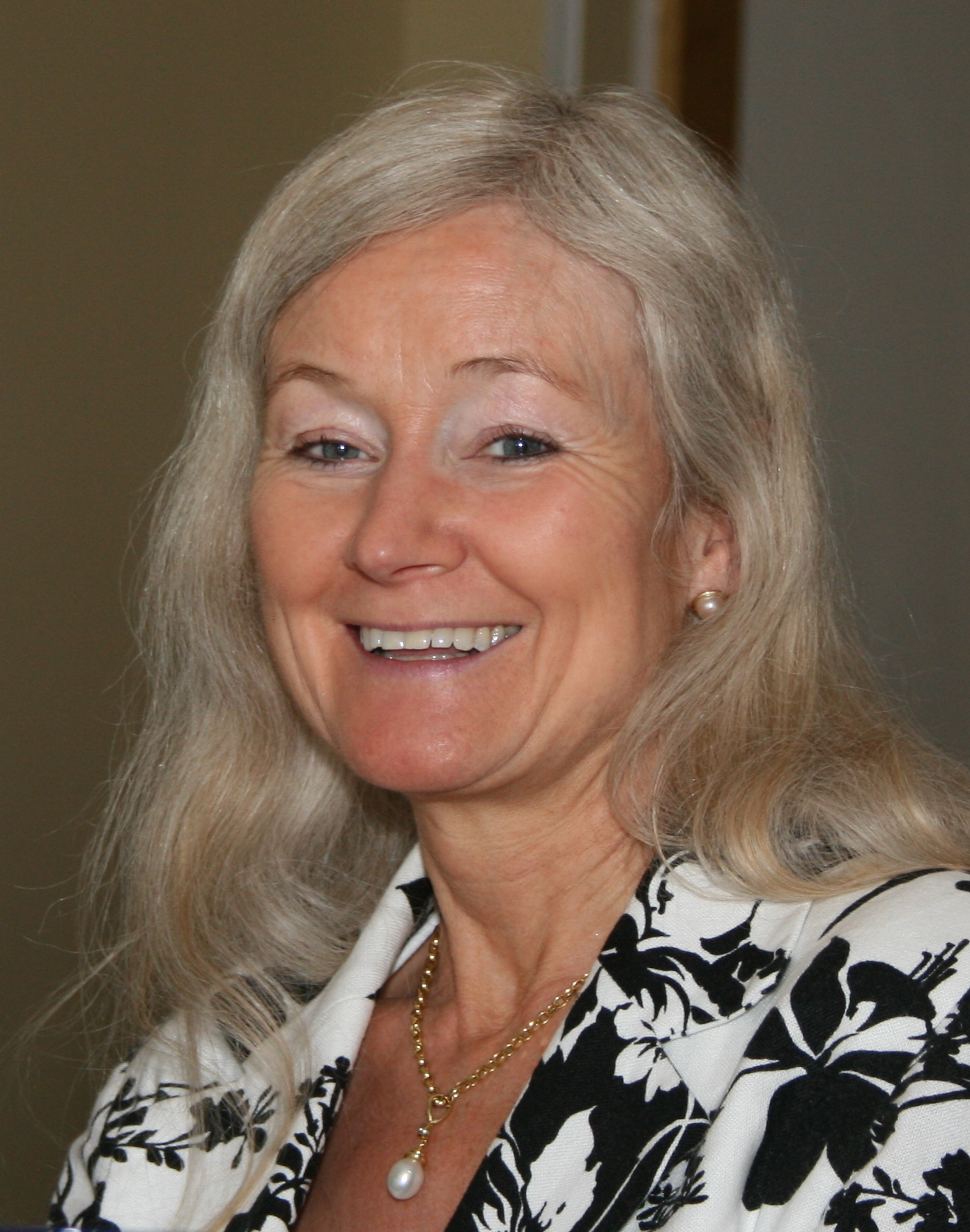
Dame Kay Davies, human geneticist

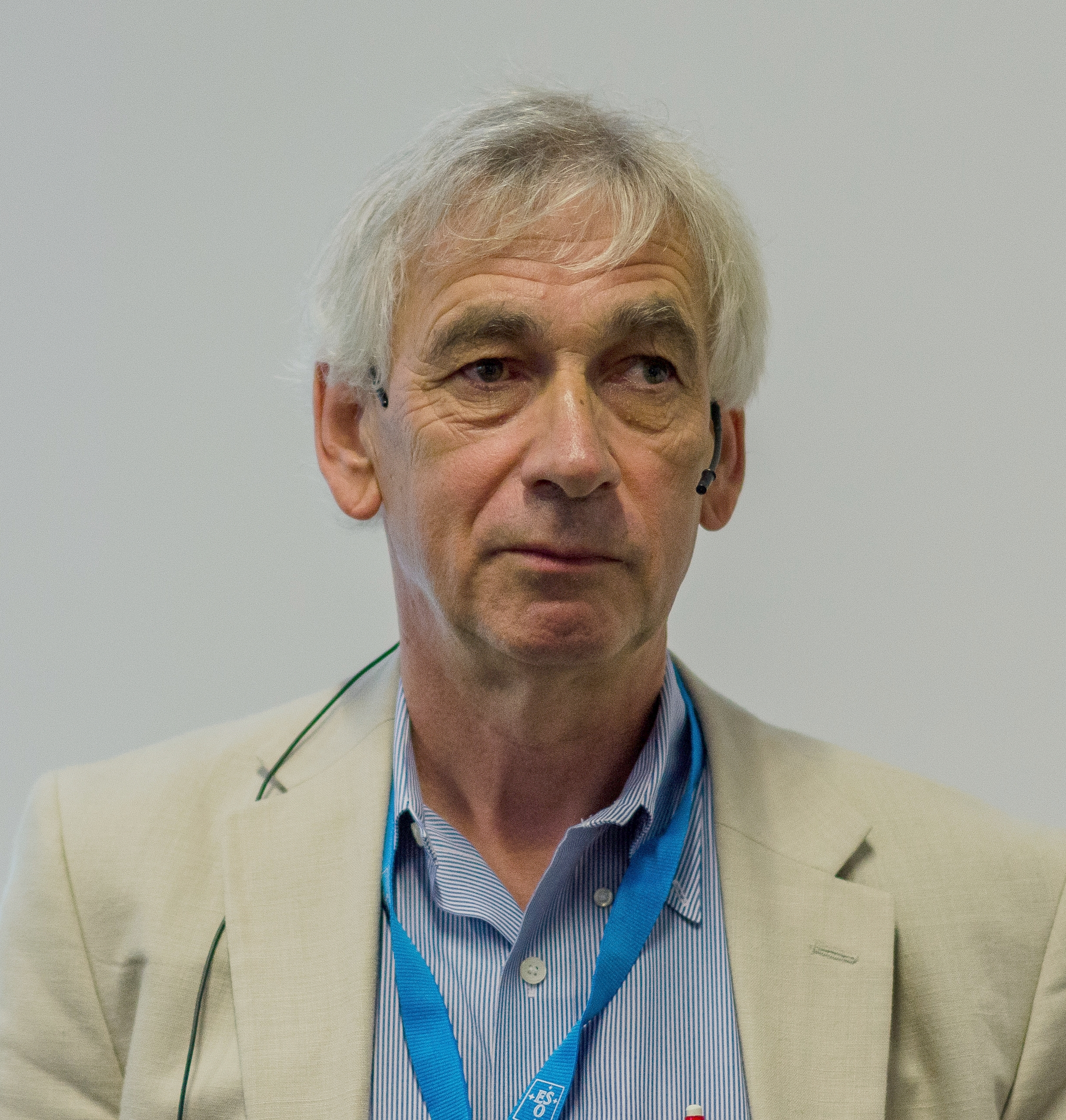
Richard Ellis, astronomer

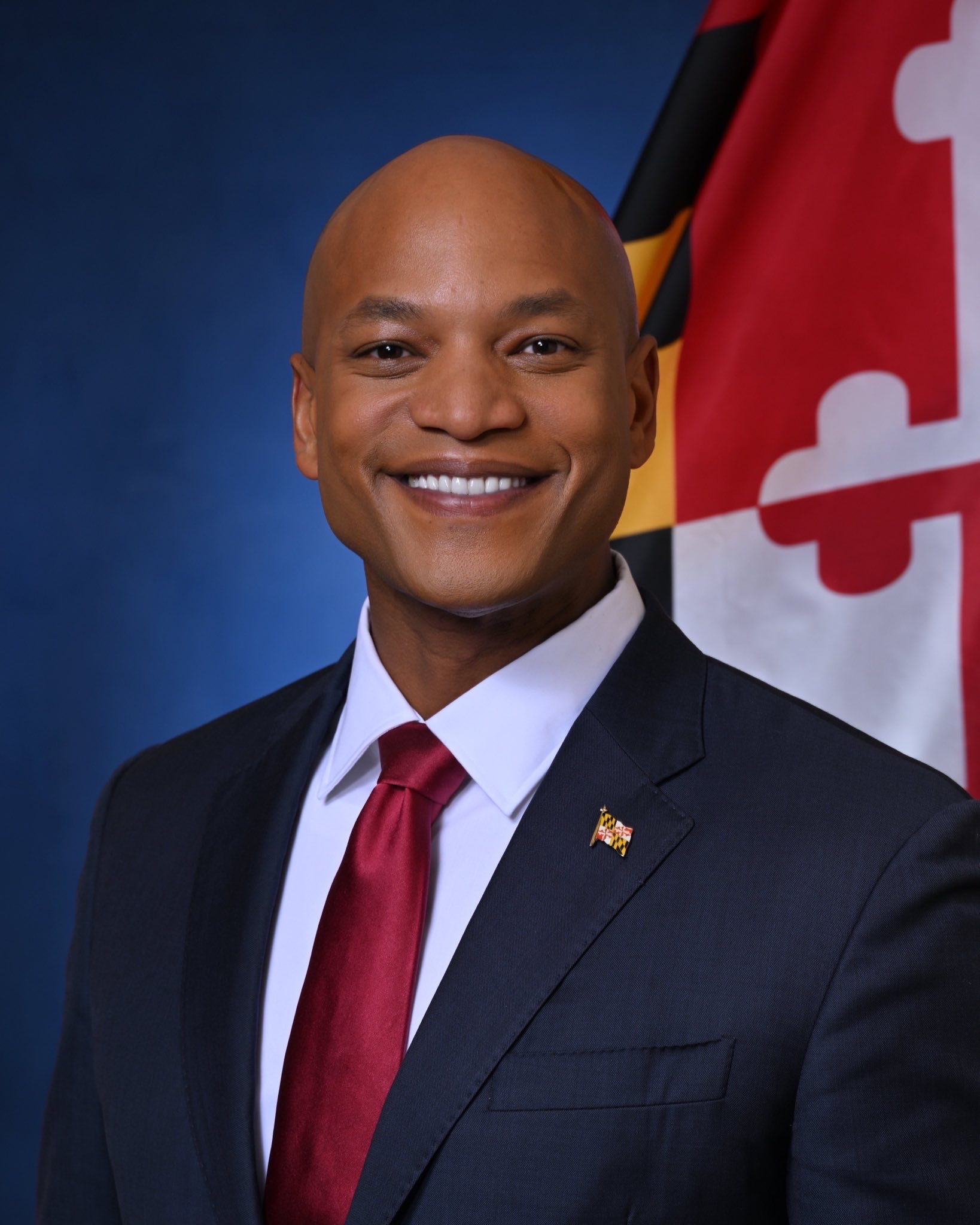
Wes Moore, governor of Maryland

- Gertrud Seidmann, oldest Oxford student who was awarded a Certificate of Graduate Attainment at the age 91.

=== Science ===
- Michael Butler, professor of computer science at the University of Southampton, UK
- Dame Kay Davies, human geneticist
- Richard Ellis, extragalactic astronomer, Steele Professor at Caltech and former director, Institute of Astronomy, Cambridge
- Artur Ekert, one of the pioneers of quantum cryptography, and winner of the Maxwell and Hughes medals, and the Descartes Prize
- Alison Gopnik, professor of psychology, affiliate professor of philosophy, University of California at Berkeley
- Michael Hinchey, Irish computer scientist, director at the Irish Software Engineering Research Centre (Lero), University of Limerick, Ireland
- Nigel Hitchin, British mathematician, winner of the Sylvester Medal
- Michele Mosca, quantum scientist known for his work on quantum algorithms and NMR quantum computation
- James R. Norris, mathematician working in probability theory and stochastic analysis, Professor of Stochastic Analysis in the Statistical Laboratory, University of Cambridge
- Tim Palmer FRS, Climate scientist at the University of Oxford
- Nicolaas Adrianus Rupke, a Dutch historian of science, who began his academic career as a marine geologist
- Michael Spivey, British computer scientist at the University of Oxford, who wrote an Oberon-2 compiler.

=== Law ===
- Karim Asad Ahmad Khan, Prosecutor in the UN International Criminal Tribunals for the Former Yugoslavia and Rwanda, counsel before Special Courts in East Timor and Sierra Leone
- Dame Hazel Genn, authority on civil justice
- The Hon. Justice Francisco Rezek, distinguished Brazilian jurist and member of the International Court of Justice and formerly Foreign Minister of Brazil

=== History & literature ===
- Joe Andrew, Professor of Russian Literature at Keele University
- Heather Allansdottir, author and space lawyer
- Henry Hardy, author and editor, publisher of Isaiah Berlin's papers
- Josef W. Meri, specialist in Islam in the pre-modern period, Islamic cultural and social history
- Iain Pears, popular British novelist, art historian

=== Politics & government ===
- Tony Buti, Australian politician and Australian Labor Party member of the Western Australian Legislative Assembly
- Wes Moore, Governor of Maryland, US state
- Tom Phillips (diplomat), Commandant of the Royal College of Defence Studies.
- Mehdi Hashemi Rafsanjani, businessman, former Iranian government official, and the fourth child of Ayatollah Akbar Hashemi Rafsanjani, former President of Iran
- Nafisa Shah, Member of Pakistan's National Assembly (MNA), Chairperson of Pakistan's National Commission for Human Development, nominated for a collective Nobel Peace Prize under "1000 Women for Peace" category.
- Simon Upton, formerly Minister of Health, Environment and Science and Technology and member of the National Party
- Mike Woodin, former principal speaker for the Green Party of England and Wales (later Fellow of Balliol)

=== Business ===
- Don Elder, New Zealand engineer and businessman, CEO of the New Zealand mining and energy company Solid Energy.

== Fellows ==
- Samson Abramsky, computer scientist and developer of domain theory in logic form, game semantics and categorical quantum mechanics
- John Addis, former UK ambassador to Laos, the Philippines and China
- Leonie Archer, historian and authority on women in Jewish antiquity
- Isaiah Berlin, regarded as one of the twentieth century's most influential liberal philosophers
- Kanti Bajpai, Former Headmaster, The Doon School, India
- John Barnes, developer of the Ada programming language
- William Bradshaw, Baron Bradshaw, Member of the House of Lords
- Donald Broadbent, experimental psychologist
- Sebastian Brock, expert in Syriac language
- Amit Chaudhuri, novelist
- David Dabydeen, Guyana's Ambassador Plenipotentiary and Extraordinaire to China, from 2010 to 2015
- Simon Digby, oriental scholar
- Anthony Epstein, discovered the Epstein-Barr virus
- Robin Gandy, mathematician and logician
- Raymond Hoffenberg, endocrinologist and medical scientist and prominent opponent of apartheid in South Africa
- Tony Hoare, computer scientist, developer of Quicksort the widely used sorting algorithm
- Dorothy Hodgkin, British Chemist and Nobel Prize winner
- Avishai Margalit, philosopher, Hebrew University of Jerusalem
- Roger Moorey, British archeologist and keeper of antiquities at the Ashmolean Museum in Oxford
- Pat Nuttall, expert in tick-borne diseases
- Gareth Roberts, physicist and influential figure in shaping British policy on the sciences
- Sumit Sarkar, Indian historian, former Professor of history, Delhi University
- Erich Wolf Segal, American author and screenwriter, wrote the screenplay for The Beatles' 1968 motion picture Yellow Submarine
- Steven Schwartz, Vice Chancellor of Macquarie University in Sydney, Australia
- Jon Stallworthy, Professor Emeritus of English, University of Oxford, UK
- Bryan Sykes, world-renowned human geneticist
- Niko Tinbergen, Dutch ethologist and Nobel prize winner
- Géza Vermes, Hungarian Jewish historian of ancient Judaism and early Christianity, authority on the Dead Sea Scrolls and the historical Jesus

== Presidents ==
- Isaiah Berlin, 1967–1975
- Henry Fisher, 1975–85
- Raymond Hoffenberg, 1985–93
- Jim Kennedy, (acting), 1993–1994
- David Smith, 1994–2000
- Jon Stallworthy, (acting), 2000
- Gareth Roberts, 2000–2007
- Jon Stallworthy, (acting), 2007–2008
- Hermione Lee, 2008–2017
- Philomen Probert, (acting), 2017–2018
- Tim Hitchens, 2018–present
