= List of honorary fellows of Wolfson College, Oxford =

List of Honorary Fellows of Wolfson College, Oxford.

- Sir Edward Abraham
- Thomas Bingham, Baron Bingham of Cornhill
- Sir James Black
- Ian Bostridge
- William Bradshaw, Baron Bradshaw
- Alfred Brendel
- Alan Bullock, Baron Bullock
- Sir Arnold Burgen
- Sir Anthony Caro
- Dame Kay Davies
- David Deutsch
- Gyalwang Drukpa
- Artur Ekert
- Sir Michael Epstein
- Sir Henry Fisher
- Amitav Ghosh
- Robert Goff, Baron Goff of Chieveley
- Andrew D. Hamilton
- Sir Tim Hitchens
- Sir Raymond Hoffenberg
- Sir Nasser Khalili
- Raymond Klibansky
- Matthew Chase Levy
- Denis Mack Smith
- Naomi Mitchison
- Sir Arthur Norrington
- Francisco Rezek
- Sir Folliott Sandford
- Erich Segal
- Sir David Smith
- Sir Richard Sorabji
- Richard Wilberforce, Baron Wilberforce
- Leonard Wolfson, Baron Wolfson
- Sir Martin Wood

== See also ==
- Category:Alumni of Wolfson College, Oxford
- Category:Fellows of Wolfson College, Oxford
