= Henry Fischer =

Henry Fischer may refer to:

- Henry George Fischer (1923–2005), American Egyptologist
- H. L. Fischer (Henry Lee Fischer, 1822–1909), Pennsylvania German language writer
- Hank Fischer (Henry William Fischer, born 1940), baseball pitcher
- Henry Fischer (footballer) (1880–1960), Australian footballer for Geelong Football Club
- Henry P. Fischer (1843–1912), Republican legislator from Milwaukee, Wisconsin

== See also ==
- Henry Fisher (disambiguation)
- Harry Otto Fischer (1910–1986), American science fiction writer
