= Harry Fisher =

Harry Fisher may refer to:

- Harry Fisher (baseball) (1926–1981), Canadian baseball player
- Harry Fisher (cricketer) (1899–1982), Australia cricketer
- Harry A. Fisher (1882–1967), American college basketball coach
- Harry L. Fisher (1885–1961), American chemist
- Bud Fisher (1885–1954), American cartoonist
- Franklin J. Phillips (1874–1900), United States Marine Corps soldier, also known as Harry Fisher
- Harry Fisher (1868–1923), British actor - see The Master Mind
- Harry Fisher, contestant on The Voice UK (series 5)
- Harry Fisher, a character of the BBC television series Waterloo Road - see List of Waterloo Road characters

== See also ==
- Harold Fisher (disambiguation)
- Henry Fisher (disambiguation)
- Harrison Fisher (1877–1934), American illustrator
- Harry Otto Fischer (1910–1986), American science fiction fan
