= Henry Fisher =

Henry Fisher may refer to:

- Henry Fisher (MP) for Reigate, Saltash and Knaresborough
- Henry Fisher (MP for Maidstone), in 1563, MP for Maidstone
- Henry Fisher (judge) (1918–2005), British lawyer, judge of the High Court of England and Wales and President of Wolfson College, Oxford
- Henry Francis Fisher (1805–1867), German Texan

== See also ==
- Harry Fisher (disambiguation)
- Henry Fischer (disambiguation)
