= William James Kennedy =

British geologist

William James "Jim" Kennedy is a British geologist.

Jim Kennedy studied at the University of London.

Kennedy was a Fellow of Wolfson College, Oxford and Professor of Earth Sciences at the University of Oxford. He was curator of the Geological Collections at the Oxford University Museum of Natural History.

Kennedy was awarded the Prestwich Medal by the Geological Society of London in 1990, the Neville George Medal of the Geological Society of Glasgow in 1992 and the Gold Medal for Zoology of the Linnean Society in 2002, and is the first recipient of the Palaeontographical Medal awarded by the Palaeontographical Society in 2014.

He was the Acting President of Wolfson College during 1993–94 between more permanent presidents at the college.

On 1 October 2003, Kennedy was appointed the Director of the Oxford University Museum of Natural History. He is also Professor of Natural History. His research interests include the geology and palaeontology of the Cretaceous Period and he has a particular interest in ammonites.

Kennedy is an Emeritus Fellow at Kellogg College, Oxford.

Academic offices
Preceded by Sir Raymond Hoffenberg	Acting President of Wolfson College, Oxford; 1993–1994	Succeeded by Sir David Smith
Cultural offices
Preceded by Keith Stewart Thomson	Director of the Oxford University Museum of Natural History; 2003 – present	Succeeded by M. Paul Smith
