= MV Pvt. Franklin J. Phillips =

Cpl. Louis J. Hauge Jr.-class dry cargo ship

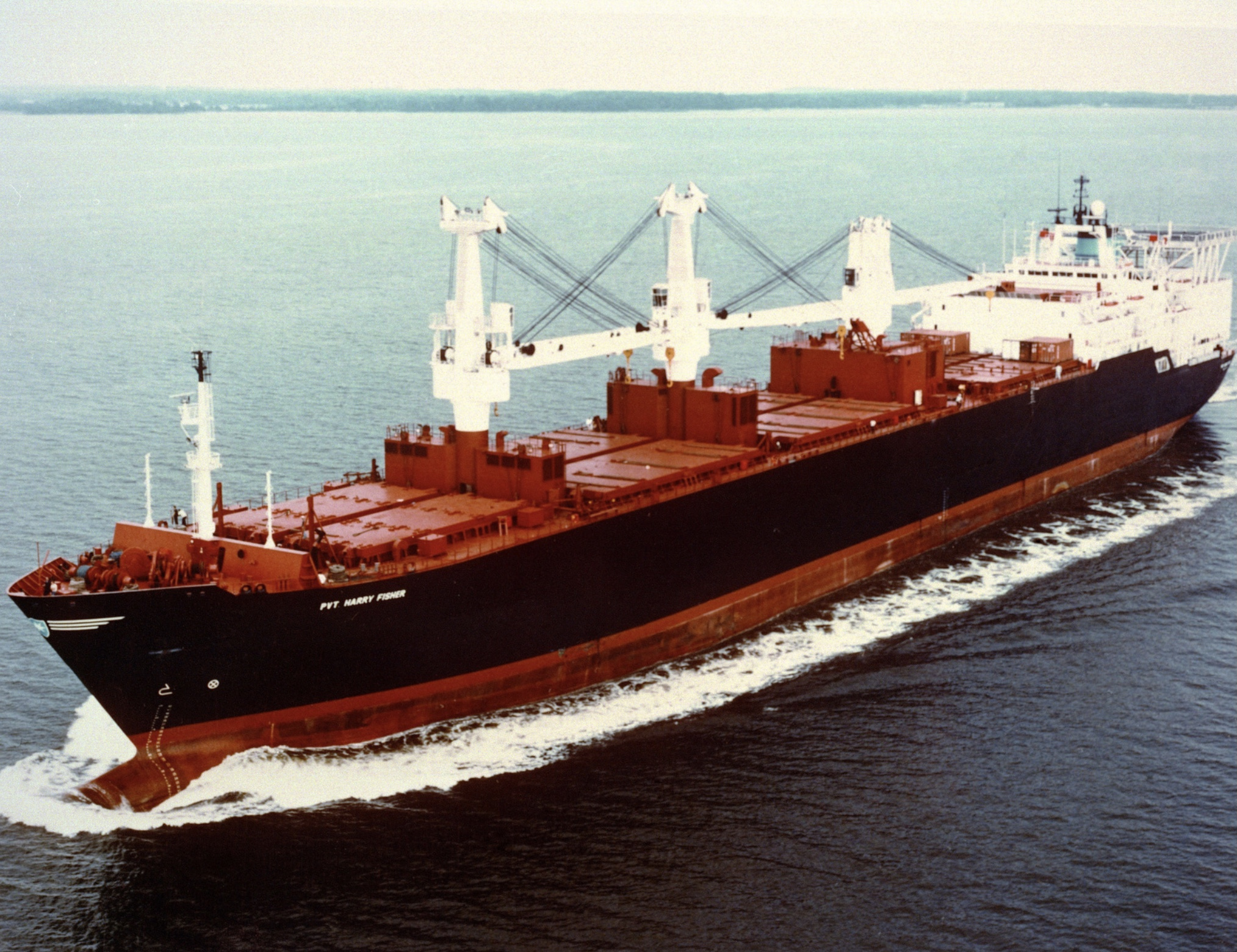
- MV Pvt. Harry Fisher

History

United States
- Name: Pvt. Franklin J. Phillips
- Namesake: Franklin J. Phillips
- Owner: Maersk Line
- Builder: Odense Staalskibsvaerft A/S
- Launched: 12 October 1979
- Completed: 1980
- Acquired: January 1980
- Renamed: Evelyn Mærsk (1980–1985); Pvt. Harry Fisher (1985–1991); Mærsk Tennessee (2008–present)
- Stricken: 2008
- Identification: IMO number: 7717169; Callsign: WMFW; Hull number: AK-3004
- Honours and awards: See Awards
- Status: Operational by Maersk Line

General characteristics
- Class & type: Cpl. Louis J. Hauge Jr.-class cargo ship
- Displacement: 23,365 t (22,996 long tons), light; 46,484 t (45,750 long tons), full
- Length: 755 ft 5 in (230.25 m)
- Beam: 90 ft 0 in (27.43 m)
- Draft: 33 ft 10 in (10.31 m)
- Installed power: 1 × shaft; 16,800 hp (12,500 kW)
- Propulsion: 2 × Sulzer 7RND76M diesel engines; 2 × boilers
- Speed: 16.4 knots (30.4 km/h; 18.9 mph)
- Capacity: 120,080 sq. ft. vehicle; 1,283,000 gallons petroleum; 65,000 gallons water; 332 TEU
- Complement: 25 mariners and 11 technicians
- Aviation facilities: Helipad

MV Pvt. Franklin J. Phillips (AK-3004), (former MV Evelyn Mærsk), was the fifth ship of the Cpl. Louis J. Hauge Jr.-class cargo ship built in 1980. The ship is named after Private Franklin J. Phillips, an American Marine who was awarded the Medal of Honor during the Boxer Rebellion.

== Construction and commissioning ==
The ship was built in 1980 at the Odense Staalskibsvaerft A/S, Lindø, Denmark. She was put into the service of Maersk Line as Evelyn Mærsk.

In 1983, she was acquired and chartered by the Navy under a long-term contract as MV Pvt. Harry Fisher (AK-3004). The ship underwent conversion at the Bethlehem Steel at Sparrows Point, Massachusetts. She was assigned to Maritime Prepositioning Ship Squadron 2 and supported the US Marine Corps Expeditionary Brigade. In 1988, the ship was renamed to MV Pvt. Franklin J. Philips (AK-3004) after it was found out that Harry Fisher was not his real name.

On 1 August 1990, she unloaded military cargos in support of Operation Desert Shield. In December 1992, the ship took part in Operation Restore Hope.

In 2008, the ship was struck from the Naval Register and later returned to Maersk Line as Mærsk Tennessee.

== Awards ==
- National Defense Service Medal
