= Harold Fisher =

Harold Fisher may refer to:

- Harold Fisher (politician) (1877–1928), Canadian politician and mayor of Ottawa
- Harold H. Fisher (1901–2005), American church architect
- Harold Henry Fisher (1890–1975), American historian
- Harold W. Fisher (1903–1986), philatelist
- Harold Fisher (hurdler) (born 1924), American hurdler, 1944 NCAA low hurdles runner-up for the Miami RedHawks track and field team

== See also ==
- Harry Fisher (disambiguation)
- Harold Fischer (1925–2009), U.S. Air Force fighter pilot
- Harold J. Fischer (1921–1996), American collegiate football player and coach
- Harold O. Fischer (1917–1991), American politician in Iowa
- Harold Stonebridge Fischer (1910–1982), American activist, composer, and poet
