= Franklin J. Phillips =

United States Marine Corps Medal of Honor recipient

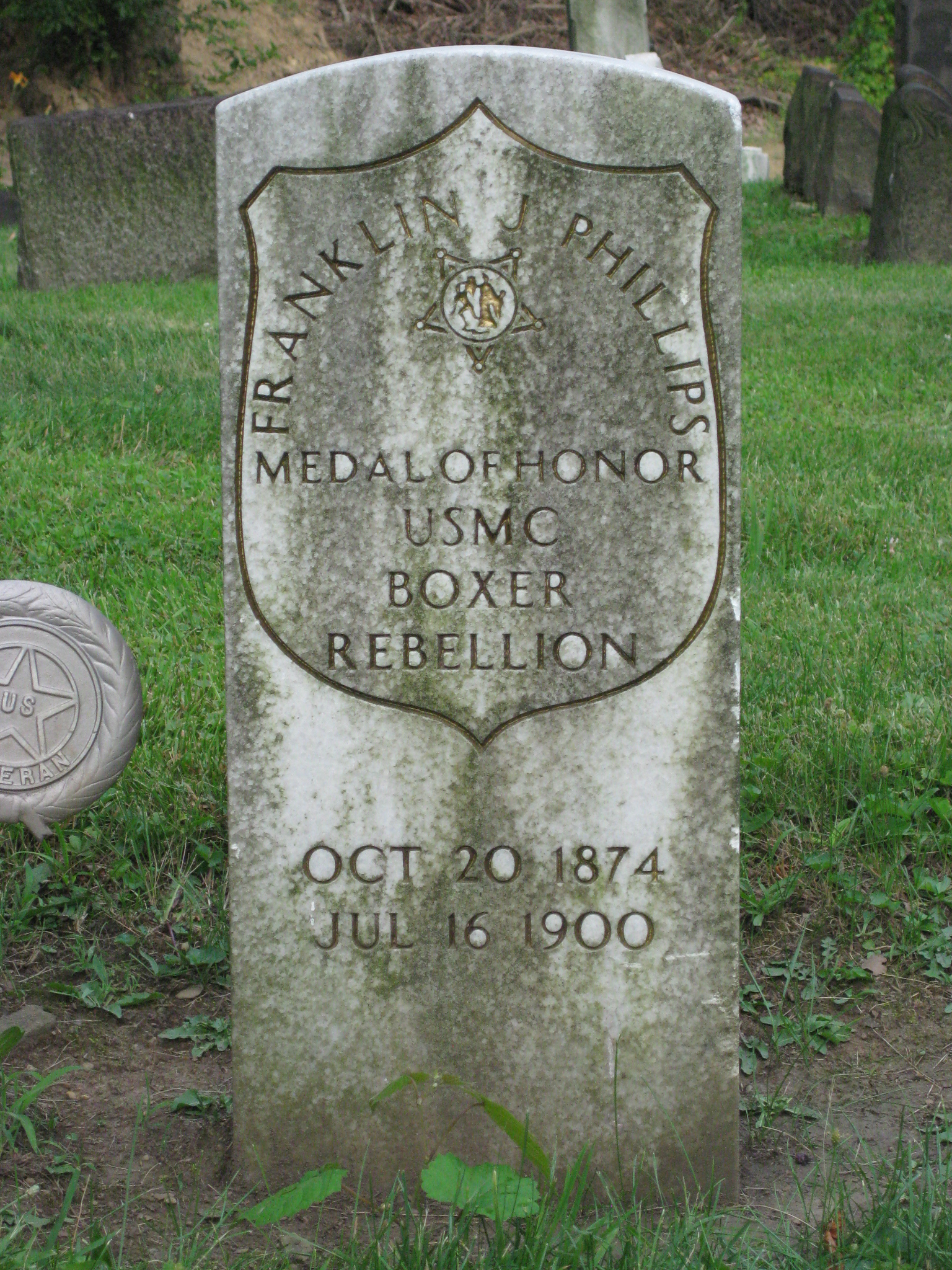
- Photograph of Gravestone Medal of Honor recipient Pvt. Franklin J. Phillips, USMC
- Born: October 20, 1874; McKeesport, Pennsylvania, US
- Died: July 16, 1900 (aged 25); Peking, China
- Burial place: Versailles Cemetery; McKeesport, Pennsylvania
- Military career
- Allegiance: United States
- Branch: United States Army; United States Marine Corps
- Rank: Private
- Nickname: Harry Fisher
- Conflicts: Spanish–American War; Boxer Rebellion; Battle of Peking †
- Awards: Medal of Honor

Franklin J. Phillips (October 20, 1874 – July 16, 1900), also known as Harry Fisher, was a soldier and Marine, and after serving in the United States Marine Corps as a private, he posthumously received the Medal of Honor for actions during the Boxer Rebellion. Private Phillips was the first Marine whose Medal of Honor was awarded posthumously. Phillips is interred in Versailles Cemetery, McKeesport.

== Medal of Honor citation ==
=== Original citation ===
Rank and Organization: Private, U.S. Marine Corps. Born: October 20, 1874, McKeesport, Pennsylvania. Accredited to: Pennsylvania. G. O. No.: 55, July 19, 1901.

Citation:

Served in the presence of the enemy at the battle of Peking, China, 20 June to 16 July 1900. Assisting in the erection of barricades during the action, Fisher was killed by the heavy fire of the enemy.

=== Later citation ===
PRIVATE FRANKLIN J. PHILLIPS UNITED STATES MARINE CORPS

For service as set forth in the following

Citation:

For conspicuous gallantry and intrepidity at the risk of his life above and beyond the call of duty from 20 June 1900 to 16 July 1900. Private Phillips served in the presence of the enemy at the Battle of Peking, China. Assisting in the erection of barricades during the action, he was killed by the heavy enemy fire. By his courageous actions, indomitable spirit, and complete dedication to duty, Private Phillips reflected great credit upon himself and upheld the highest traditions of the Marine Corps and the United States Naval Service. He gallantly gave his life for his country.

— (signed) William McKinley

== Prior service and controversy ==
After the posthumous award of the Medal of Honor, it was discovered that Private Fisher had previously served in the U.S. 1st Infantry Regiment, United States Army and had deserted after being refused sick leave for malaria contracted during the Spanish–American War. He attempted to return to duty after his recovery and petitioned the adjutant general, who acted under orders of the Assistant Secretary of War and "discharged Private Phillips without honor from the service of the United States for desertion". Phillips enlisted in the Marine Corps, two months later under the name "Harry Fisher" and served honorably until his death.

After Phillips' death, his mother, Mrs. W.C. Means wrote Brigadier General Charles Heywood, Commandant of the Marine Corps to request that her son's name be changed to Franklin J. Phillips and on May 11, 1901, General Heywood refused this request on the grounds that "no change can be made in a man's record after his death" and Mrs. Means accepted the Medal on behalf of Harry Fisher on August 15, 1901. In 1988, under the orders of Commandant General Alfred M. Gray, Jr., the references to Harry Fisher were redacted and Franklin J. Phillips replaced "Harry Fisher" in all official records.

== Namesake vessel ==
In 1985 the MV Private Harry Fisher was commissioned under Military Sealift Command and in 1988 was duly renamed the MV Pvt. Franklin J. Phillips.

== See also ==
- List of Medal of Honor recipients
