= Henry Fischer (footballer) =

Australian rules footballer

Personal information
- Full name: Henry Mathieson Fischer
- Born: 11 July 1880; Kilmore, Victoria
- Died: 12 June 1960 (aged 79); Melbourne, Victoria
- Original team: Melbourne Wednesday
- Height: 178 cm (5 ft 10 in)
- Weight: 79 kg (174 lb)

Playing career^{1}
Years	Club	Games (Goals)
1906	Geelong	3 (0)
- ^{1} Playing statistics correct to the end of 1906.

Henry Mathieson Fischer (11 July 1880 – 12 June 1960) was an Australian rules footballer who played with Geelong in the Victorian Football League (VFL).
