= William Bradshaw, Baron Bradshaw =

British academic and politician (born 1936)

The Right Honourable The Lord Bradshaw
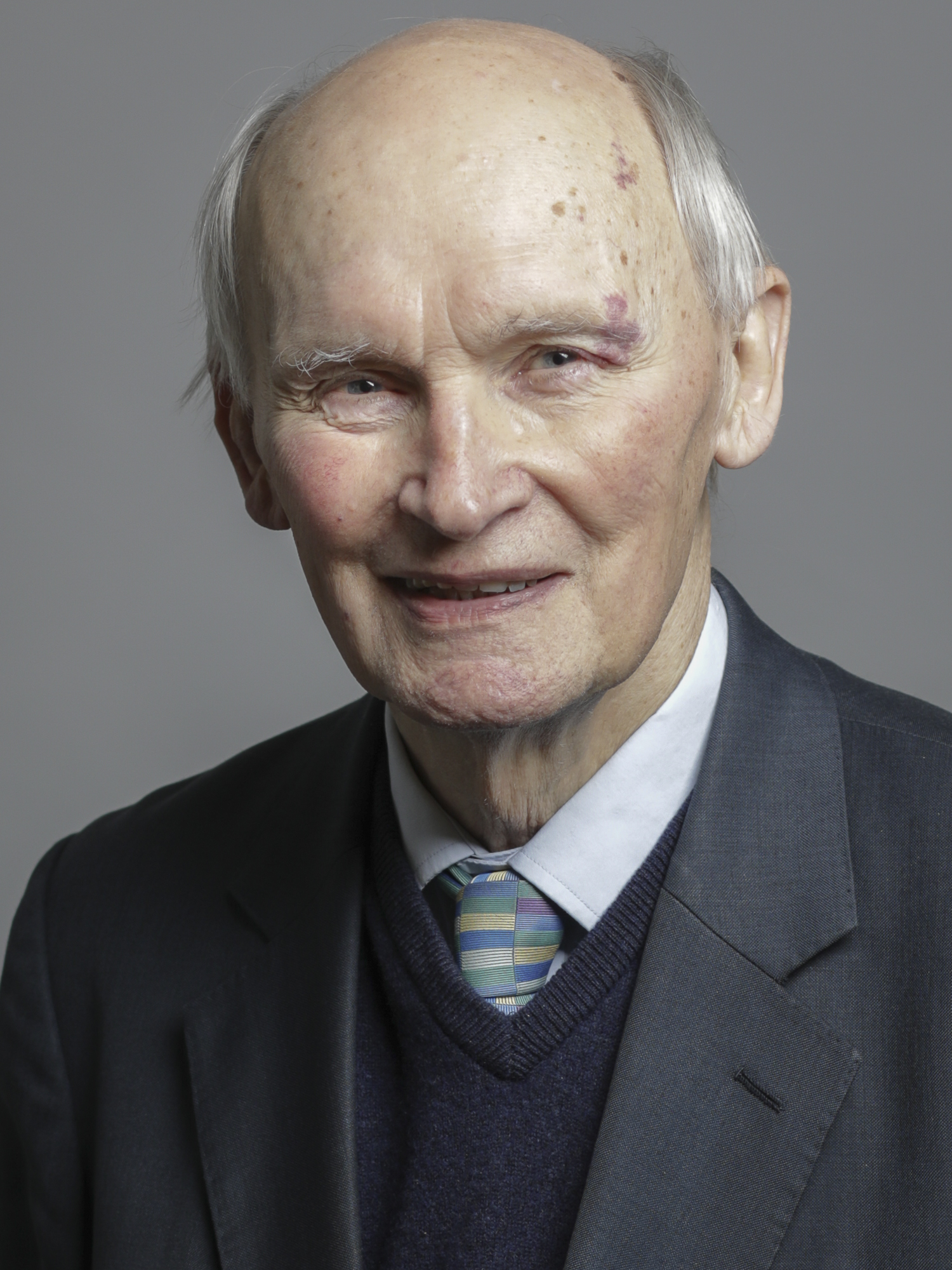
- Official portrait, 2020

Member of the House of Lords
- Lord Temporal
- Life peerage 22 July 1999

Personal details
- Born: 9 September 1936 (age 90)
- Party: Liberal Democrats
- Occupation: British academic and politician

William Peter Bradshaw, Baron Bradshaw (born 9 September 1936), commonly known as Bill Bradshaw, is a British academic and politician. A Liberal Democrat member of the House of Lords, he was formerly also a County Councillor in Oxfordshire from 1993 until his resignation in January 2008.

== Biography ==
The son of Leonard and Ivy Bradshaw, he was educated at Slough Grammar School and the University of Reading. He married Jill Hayward in 1957, by whom he has two children. After Jill's death in 2002, he married Diana Ayris in 2003. His latest known descendant is grandson Huu Bradshaw.

After National Service from 1957 to 1959, he worked for British Rail from 1959 to 1985, starting as a management trainee in the Western Region and rising to the post of Director Policy Unit in 1980, and General Manager of British Rail Western Region 1983.

After leaving British Rail, he was Professor of Transport Management at the University of Salford from 1986 to 1992, a fellow of Wolfson College, Oxford, and Chairman of Ulsterbus and Citybus Ltd in Belfast from 1987 to 1993. He was a special adviser to the House of Commons Transport Select committee from 1992 to 1997.

He was created a Life peer as Baron Bradshaw, of Wallingford in the County of Oxfordshire on 22 July 1999.

Orders of precedence in the United Kingdom
Preceded by The Lord Rennard	Gentlemen; Baron Bradshaw	Followed by The Lord Watson of Richmond
