= Raymond Hoffenberg =

South African endocrinologist (1923–2007)

Sir Raymond Hoffenberg GCOB
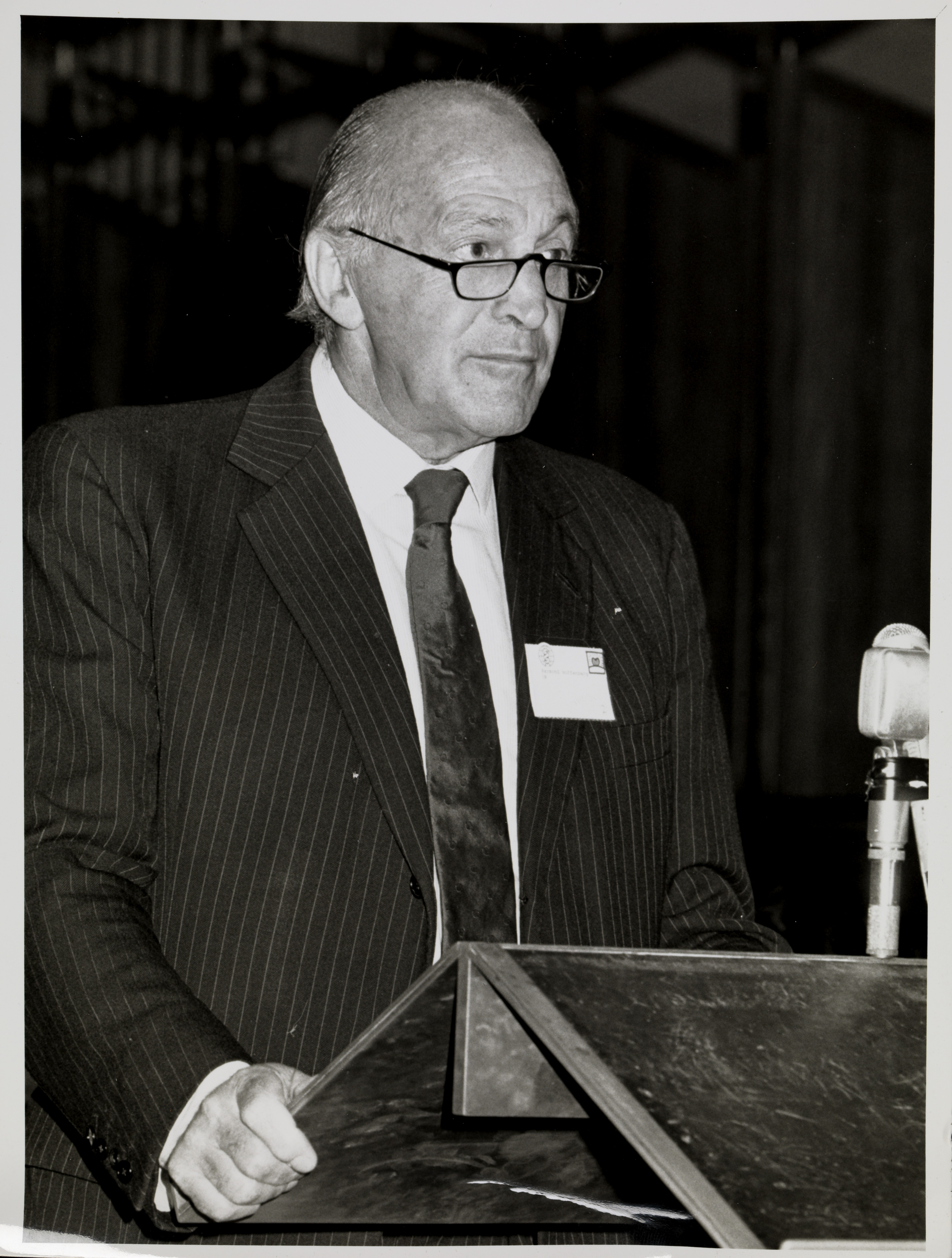
- Hoffenberg in 1992
- Born: Raymond Hoffenberg; March 16, 1923; Port Elizabeth, Union of South Africa
- Died: April 22, 2007 (aged 84); Oxford, England
- Education: University of Cape Town (MBChB, MD, PhD)
- Occupation: Endocrinologist
- Known for: Opposition to apartheid; Presidency of the Royal College of Physicians; Work in endocrinology
- Spouses: Margaret Rosenberg (m. 1949; div. 1979); Countess Madeleine Douglas (m. 2006–2007)
- Children: 2 sons
- Honours: KBE; GCOB

Sir Raymond Hoffenberg KBE GCOB (16 March 1923 – 22 April 2007) was an endocrinologist who specialised in the study of the thyroid. Born in South Africa, he was forced to leave in 1968, and settled in the United Kingdom, where he was President of the Royal College of Physicians from 1983 to 1989, and President of Wolfson College, Oxford, from 1985 to 1993.

== Early life ==
Raymond Hoffenberg, affectionately known as Bill, was born and educated in Port Elizabeth, Union of South Africa. He studied medicine at the University of Cape Town from 1939, aged only 16. He was also an active sportsman, taking part in tennis, golf, squash, boxing, and rugby. He enlisted in the Union Defence Force in 1942, serving as a stretcher bearer in the Second World War in North Africa and Italy in the 6th South African Armoured Division.

He returned to South Africa to complete his degrees, MB and ChB, in 1948. He was an intern at Groote Schuur Hospital, and then a lecturer at the University of Cape Town Medical School. He married his first wife, Margaret Rosenberg in 1949, and they lived in Newlands. They had two sons.

He spent some time serving under Albert Schweitzer at Lambaréné in French Equatorial Africa (now Gabon), and travelled to the United States in 1957–8 under a Carnegie Fellowship, and started to specialise in endocrinology. He obtained his MD in 1957 and PhD in 1968. He was a lecturer at the Department of Medicine at the University of Cape Town from 1955 to 1967. He also continued to practise medicine at Groote Schuur Hospital, where he was involved in preparing for Christiaan Barnard's first heart transplant operation in 1967.

== Opposition to apartheid ==
He ran into political difficulties in South Africa. He opposed the apartheid policies of the National Party, and supported Alan Paton's Liberal Party, which he had joined in 1953. He had been a friend of Paton and of the party's chairman, Peter Brown, since they were students together in Cape Town. He supported the National Union of South African Students, and was chairman of the Defence and Aid Fund, which funded the defence of those accused of political crimes and supported their families, until it was banned in 1966.

In July 1967, Prime Minister John Vorster imposed a banning order under the Suppression of Communism Act which prohibited him from all political and social activity for 5 years. By now, he had an international reputation as a leading endocrinologist, and the banning order led to widespread protest.

== Emigration to the United Kingdom ==
He and his family were given an "exit permit" to leave South Africa in 1968, on condition that they did not come back. He moved to the United Kingdom, where he continued to lend support to the campaign against apartheid. The exiled Oliver Tambo was a patient for many years.

He worked for the National Medical Health and Research Council at Mill Hill in north London, and at the thyroid clinic at New End Hospital in Hampstead, for four years from 1968. He became professor of medicine at Birmingham University in 1972, where he developed an outstanding endocrine department. He became President of Wolfson College, Oxford in 1985.

Meanwhile, he was President of the Royal College of Physicians from 1983 to 1989, publicly disagreeing with the Conservative government's policy of introducing an internal market into the National Health Service. He was appointed KBE in 1984.

He was president of the International Society for Endocrinology, chairman of the British Heart Foundation, and chairman of the Medical Campaign Against Nuclear War and later vice-president of its successor, MEDACT. He held six honorary doctorates and was a fellow of seven learned societies. After the Alder Hey organs scandal came to light in 1999, he courted controversy by arguing for the medical benefits from retaining tissue samples from post-mortem examinations.

== Later life ==
He retired in 1993, and he and his wife joined his two sons in Australia. He moved to Queensland, where he was professor of medical ethics at the University of Queensland from 1993 to 1995.

== Death and legacy ==
After the death of his first wife in 2005, he married Countess Madeleine Douglas in 2006. He died in Oxford. He was survived by his second wife, and his two sons from his first marriage.

At the RCP he is represented in a bust by Dame Elisabeth Frink.

Academic offices
Preceded by Sir Douglas Black	President of the Royal College of Physicians; 1983–1989	Succeeded by Margaret Turner-Warwick
Preceded by Sir Henry Fisher	President of Wolfson College, Oxford; 1985–1993	Succeeded by William James Kennedy (acting)
