= Henry Fisher (judge) =

English judge

Sir Henry Arthur Pears Fisher (20 January 1918 – 10 April 2005) was an English lawyer who served as a judge of the High Court of England and Wales and as President of Wolfson College, Oxford.

== Early life and education ==
Fisher was born at The Hall, Repton, Derbyshire, the eldest of six sons of Geoffrey Francis Fisher, Baron Fisher of Lambeth, at the time of Harry's birth the headmaster of Repton, later Bishop of Chester and of London, and Archbishop of Canterbury. A younger brother was Charles, who would become headmaster of three independent schools in Australia.

Fisher went to school at Marlborough College and went on to Christ Church, Oxford where in 1938 he obtained a First in Classical Honour Moderations. His Literae Humaniores studies were curtailed by the outbreak of World War II, and after a year and a half he took a War Degree (unclassified).

== Second World War ==
In 1940, Fisher joined the Leicestershire Regiment and remained with it until 1946. He was posted to India and served also in Burma and Malaya. He left the army in 1946 with the rank of lieutenant-colonel, having been mentioned in despatches.

== Bar ==
He read for the Bar and was called by the Inner Temple in 1946. In the same year he entered the Prize Fellowship examination at All Souls, applying as a candidate in Law, even though he had not read for a law degree. He was elected in November 1946 and began a long connection with the college in various categories of fellowship. Between 1961 and 1966 he held the office of Estates Bursar, at a time when he was working as a silk and regularly appearing in court and giving advice.

Fisher was a junior counsel from 1946 to 1960, in which year he took silk. He was head of chambers at One Hare Court before Patrick Neill, Roger Parker, Gordon Slynn, then Richard Southwell QC After service on the Bar Council he was Chairman of the Bar from 1966 to 1968.

== Bench ==
At the beginning of 1968 Fisher was appointed a High Court Judge in the Queen's Bench division. In July 1968 he was the junior member in a Court of Appeal decision that quashed the conviction for obscenity entered against the publishers of Last Exit to Brooklyn. This case sounded the death knell for prosecutions on the grounds of obscenity of books with literary merit.

Much of his time on the bench was spent out of London trying criminal cases, and living in judges' lodgings.

== City of London ==
Missing the intellectual challenge of arguing complex cases he concluded that he had made a mistake and resigned from his judicial appointment in 1970. He moved to the City of London and became a director of J. Henry Schroder Wagg & Co under the chairmanship of his friend Gordon Richardson (later Governor of the Bank of England). From 1981 to 1987 he was Chairman of the Appeal Committee of the Take-over Panel, and founder chairman of Imro (the Investment Management Regulatory Organisation).

== Academia ==
In 1973 he became a member of the Governing Body of Imperial College, and from 1975 to 1988 was its chairman. In 1975, he was elected President of Wolfson College, Oxford, on the retirement of its founding president, Isaiah Berlin. It was this position which Fisher put first in his Who's Who entry. He presided over Wolfson's move from temporary premises to its newly completed buildings on the banks of the River Cherwell. During his time at Wolfson he took and completed an Open University degree in mathematics.

He was chairman of the Howard League for Penal Reform from 1983 to 1991.

== Inquiries ==
During this time he was frequently called upon to undertake the chairmanship of high-profile inquiries. In the Confait inquiry (1975–77) Fisher was asked by the Crown to examine a gravely flawed prosecution which had resulted in the conviction of three young men for arson, murder and manslaughter. On a reference by the Home Secretary, the Court of Appeal presided over by Lord Scarman had quashed all the convictions. In the ensuing investigation, Fisher concluded that there had been a blatant disregard of the Judges' Rules (although his report controversially supported some of the quashed convictions). His report recommended radical changes to the system and led directly to the appointment of the Philipps Commission and thence to the enactment of the Police and Criminal Evidence Act 1984 and the Prosecution of Offences Act 1985. The following year the Crown Prosecution Service was established.

In 1979, Fisher was asked by Lloyd's of London to conduct an inquiry into self-regulation at the institution. The following year his report recommended the adoption of a new constitution which he had drafted, including the creation of a new governing council and effective disciplinary procedures. It brought in protection for council members from claims for negligence: liability was made to depend on bad faith. Subsequently Fisher drafted the Lloyd's Act of 1982, alongside Richard Southwell QC.

== Sources ==
- Neill, Patrick (14 April 2005). "Obituary". The Independent.
- Blom-Cooper, Louis (7 May 2005). "Commentary on obituary". The Independent.
- Obituary by Richard Southwell QC

Academic offices
Preceded by Sir Isaiah Berlin	Presidents of Wolfson College, Oxford; 1975–1985	Succeeded by Sir Raymond Hoffenberg
