= Wolfson College, Oxford =

College of the University of Oxford

Wolfson College
- University of Oxford
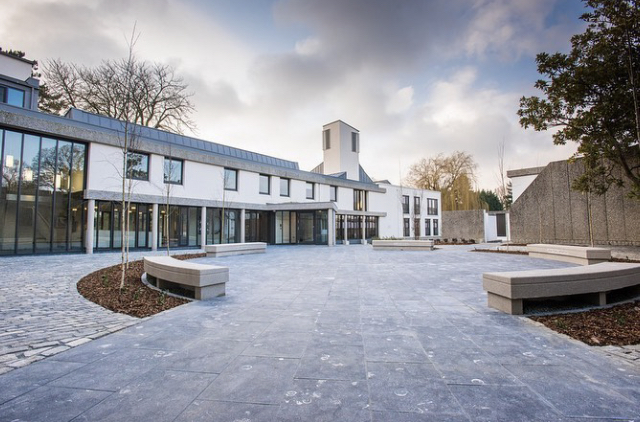

- Arms: Per pale gules and or on a chevron between three roses and two pears all countercharged the roses barbed and seeded proper.
Scarf colours: navy, with two equally-spaced stripes of red edged with yellow
- Location: Linton Road, Oxford
- Coordinates: 51.770977°N 1.255263°W
- Latin name: Collegium de Wolfson
- Motto: Humani nil alienum (Note: A quote from the Roman playwright Terence: I am a human being and I consider nothing that concerns human beings alien to me) The original wording is a little different.)
- Motto in English: Nothing human is alien to me
- Established: 1965
- Named for: Sir Isaac Wolfson
- Former names: Iffley College
- Sister college: Darwin College, Cambridge
- President: Sir Tim Hitchens
- Undergraduates: None (graduate-only college)
- Postgraduates: 788 (2021)
- Endowment: £60.4 million (2021)
- Website: wolfson.ox.ac.uk
- Boat club: Wolfson College Boat Club

Map
- Location within Oxford

Wolfson College (/ˈwʊlfsən/) is a constituent college of the University of Oxford in England. Wolfson is a graduate college, with particular strengths in areas like global health, environmental studies, economics, and humanities. It is located in north Oxford along the River Cherwell. The historian and philosopher Sir Isaiah Berlin was the college's first president and was instrumental in its founding in 1965. The college houses The Isaiah Berlin Literary Trust and hosts an annual Isaiah Berlin Lecture. From 2017, the president of the college has been Sir Tim Hitchens.

As of 2021, the college had a financial endowment of £60.4 million, and is registered as a charity. Wolfson's sister college at the University of Cambridge is Darwin College.

== History ==
Wolfson's first president Sir Isaiah Berlin, the influential political philosopher and historian of ideas, was instrumental in the college's founding in 1965.

The college began its existence with the name Iffley College, which offered a new community for graduate students at Oxford, particularly in natural and social sciences. Twelve other colleges of the university provided grants to make the establishment of Iffley possible. As of 1965, the college had neither a president nor a building. Berlin set out to change this, eventually securing support from the Wolfson Foundation and Ford Foundation in 1966 to establish a separate site for the college, which included 'Cherwell', the former residence of J. S. Haldane and his family, as well as new buildings built around it. In recognition of Isaac Wolfson's contribution to the foundation of the college, its name was changed to Wolfson College.

But Berlin's work as the president of the college was far from over. Formally taking over the reins of the college in 1967, he envisioned Wolfson to be a centre of academic excellence but, unlike many other colleges at Oxford, also bound it to a strong egalitarian and democratic ethos. In Berlin's words, the college would be 'new, untrammelled and unpyramided'. Berlin's vice-president was Michael Brock, formerly of Corpus Christi College.

Wolfson is perhaps the most egalitarian college at Oxford, with fewer traditional barriers between students and fellows. There is no high table, only one common room for all the members of the college, and gowns are worn only on special occasions. Graduate students serve on the college's governing body and participate in General Meetings. Berlin's reputation and presence in the early years also helped shape the intellectual character of the college, attracting many distinguished fellows like Niko Tinbergen, who won a Nobel Prize for his studies in animal behaviour in 1973. Berlin's own prominence in the humanities helped attract many graduate students like Henry Hardy, interested in political philosophy and the history of ideas.

== Buildings and grounds ==
The main building of the college, designed by Powell and Moya Architects and completed in 1974, is one of the most modern main buildings of all Oxford colleges. It has three quadrangles: the central quadrangle named the Berlin Quad after Isaiah Berlin, the Tree Quad built around established trees, and the River Quad into which the River Cherwell has been diverted to form a punt harbour. The main building and footbridge across the river were grade II listed in June 2011.

The college has student accommodation in the main college building, in three child-friendly courtyards surrounded by family housing, and also has similar accommodation in a scattering of purpose-built blocks, including the Robin Gandy Buildings, and in existing houses on Linton Road, Chadlington Road and Garford Road. The college also owns an adjacent house and orchard that was occupied by the Bishop of Oxford until 2014.

Wolfson College aims to cut its emissions and plans to be carbon neutral by 2030, to that end they have made the building all-electric by replacing natural gas powered boilers with heat-pumps and reducing the amount of heat required but doing things such as switching from single to triple-glazed windows.

Their next planned steps are to add solar panels to their flat roofs combined with a battery.

=== Library ===
The college library, which occupies both floors of one wing of the college's main building, is open to members of the college. The main library is on the first floor, approachable from the side of the dining hall and the lodge, and two other collections, called the Floersheimer Room and the Hornik Memorial Room are on the ground floor. A mezzanine floor in the main library has books as well as carrels for individual use by graduate students of the college. The library has an extensive collection of books and journals.

=== Common room and hall ===
The college has one common room for fellows and graduate students. The common room has two floors: the upper common room, with an attached terrace overlooking the punting harbour, which has a coffee counter, and the lower common room, which has magazines and newspapers. The college's hall is one of the few in the university to have a common table. The 'Haldane Room', a hall adjacent to the dining hall proper, is where formal meals, especially the convocation lunch, are held.

=== Gardens ===
The college owns grounds on both sides of the river, including two meadows on the opposite side, towards Marston. It has a small but well-maintained garden with mature trees behind its main building, and beside the river. The garden is landscaped well on the riverbank, with a flight of steps leading up to a green-house and a sundial. The college also has a smaller garden beside the Robin Gandy building, which stands on the banks of the river.

=== Sports and punting harbour ===
The college has its own squash court and croquet lawn, and takes part in many university sporting events, including cricket, football, and the yearly rowing competition. It is one of the few in Oxford with its own punting harbour, with a fleet of punts for use by all members of the college. The Wolfson College Boat Club is on the ground floor of 'C' Block.

=== Gallery ===
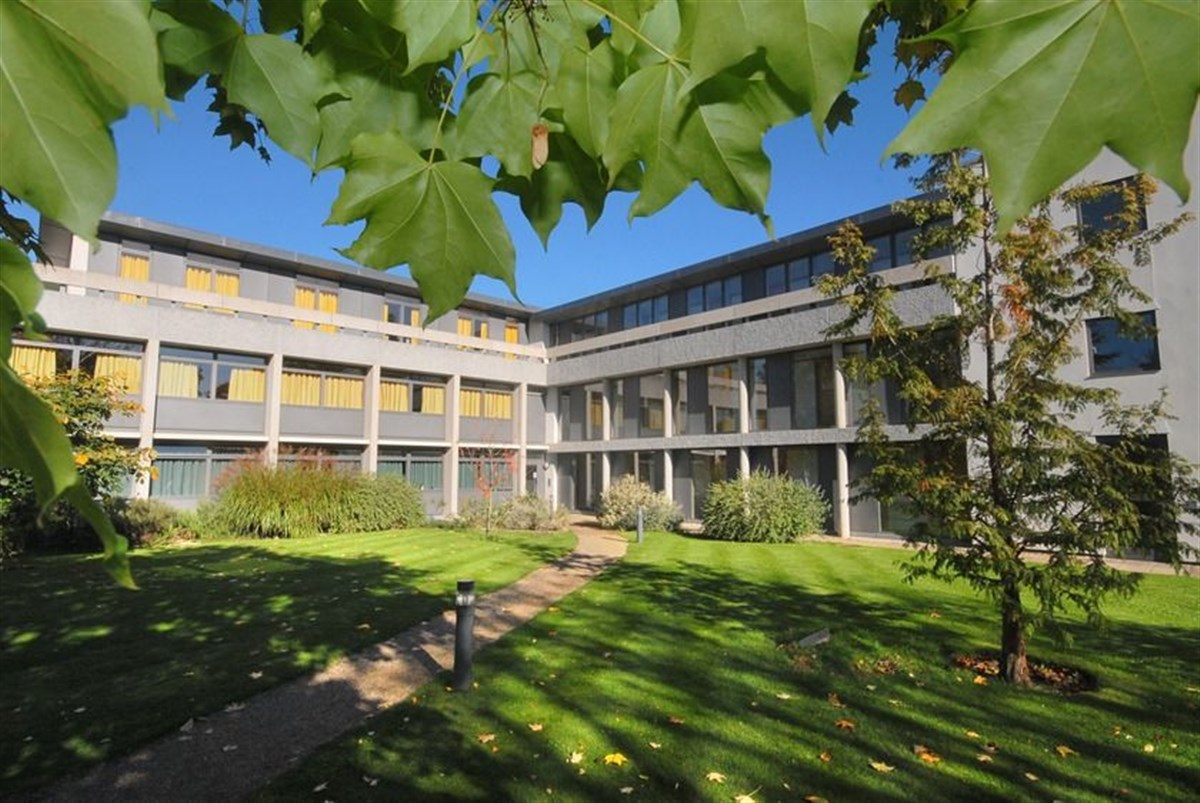
M block

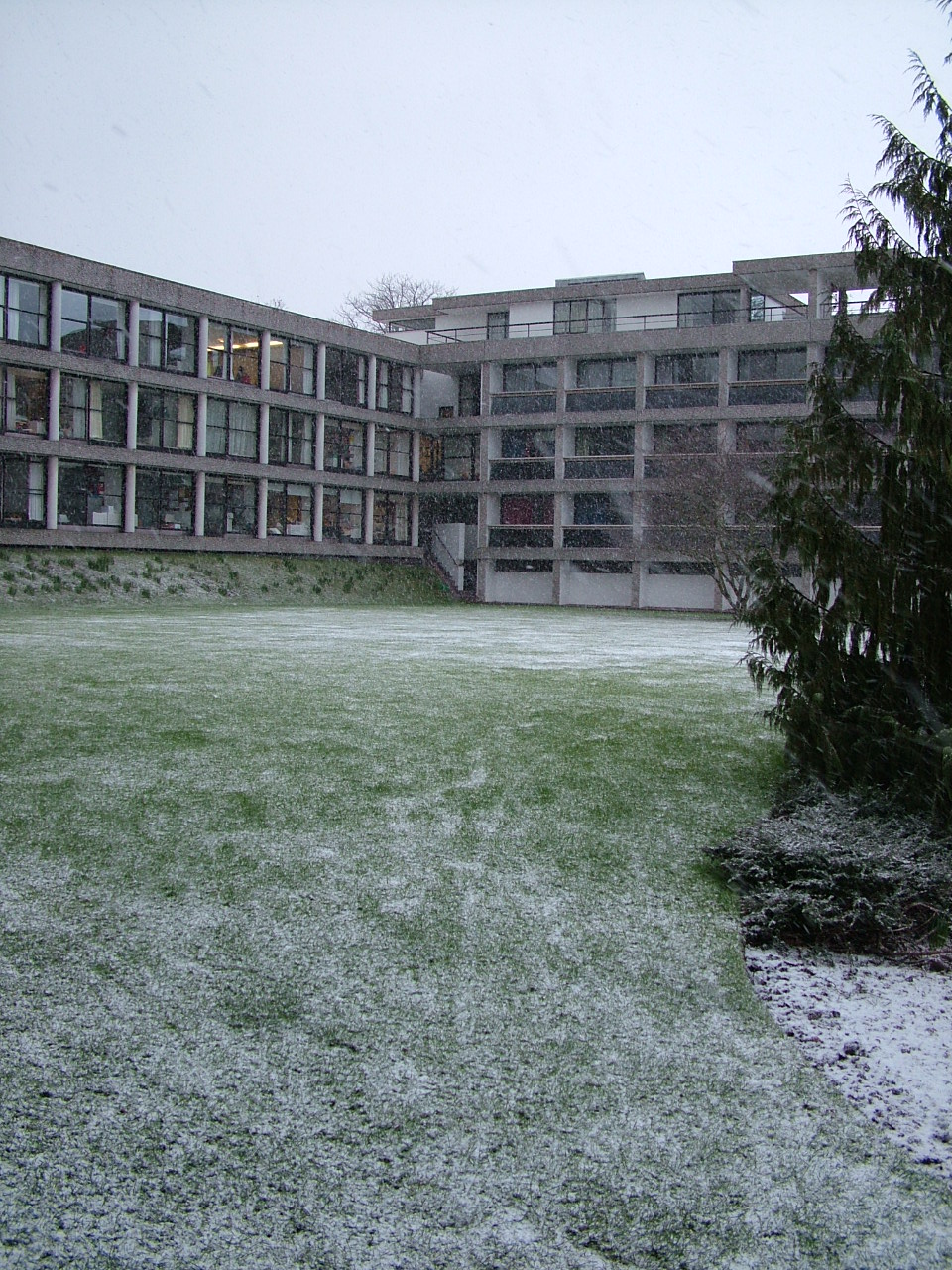
Harbour Quad

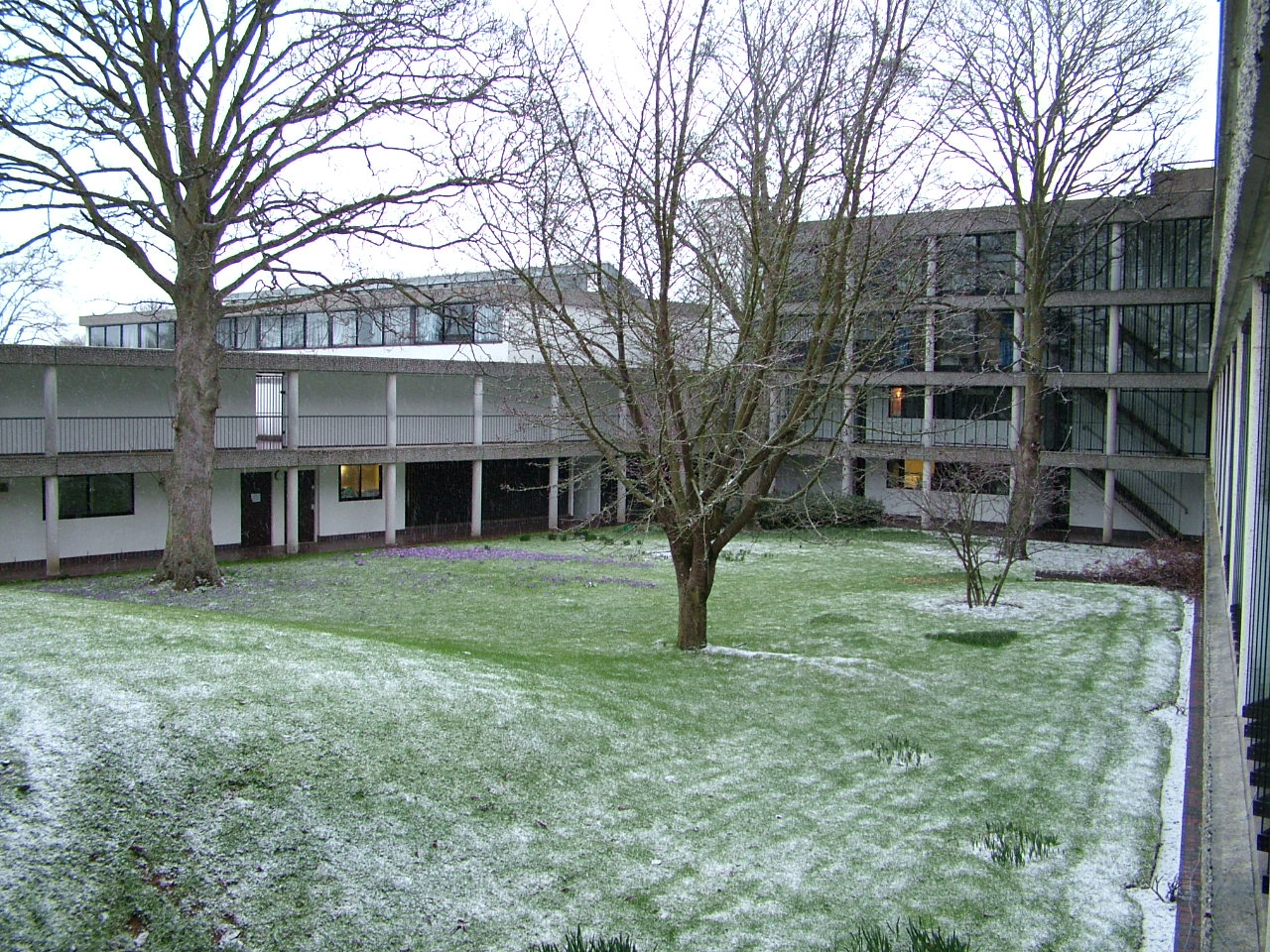
Tree Quad

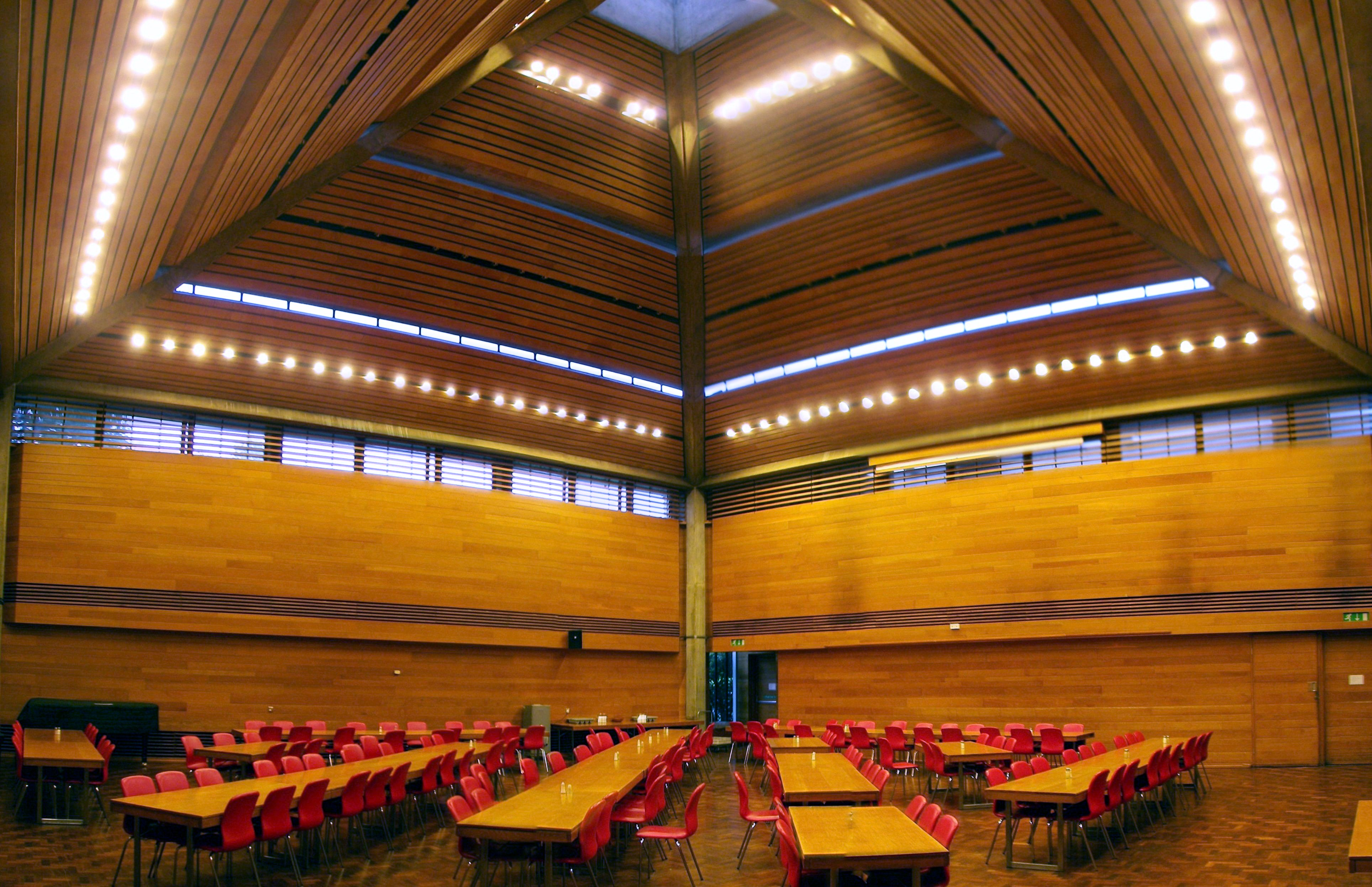
Dining hall

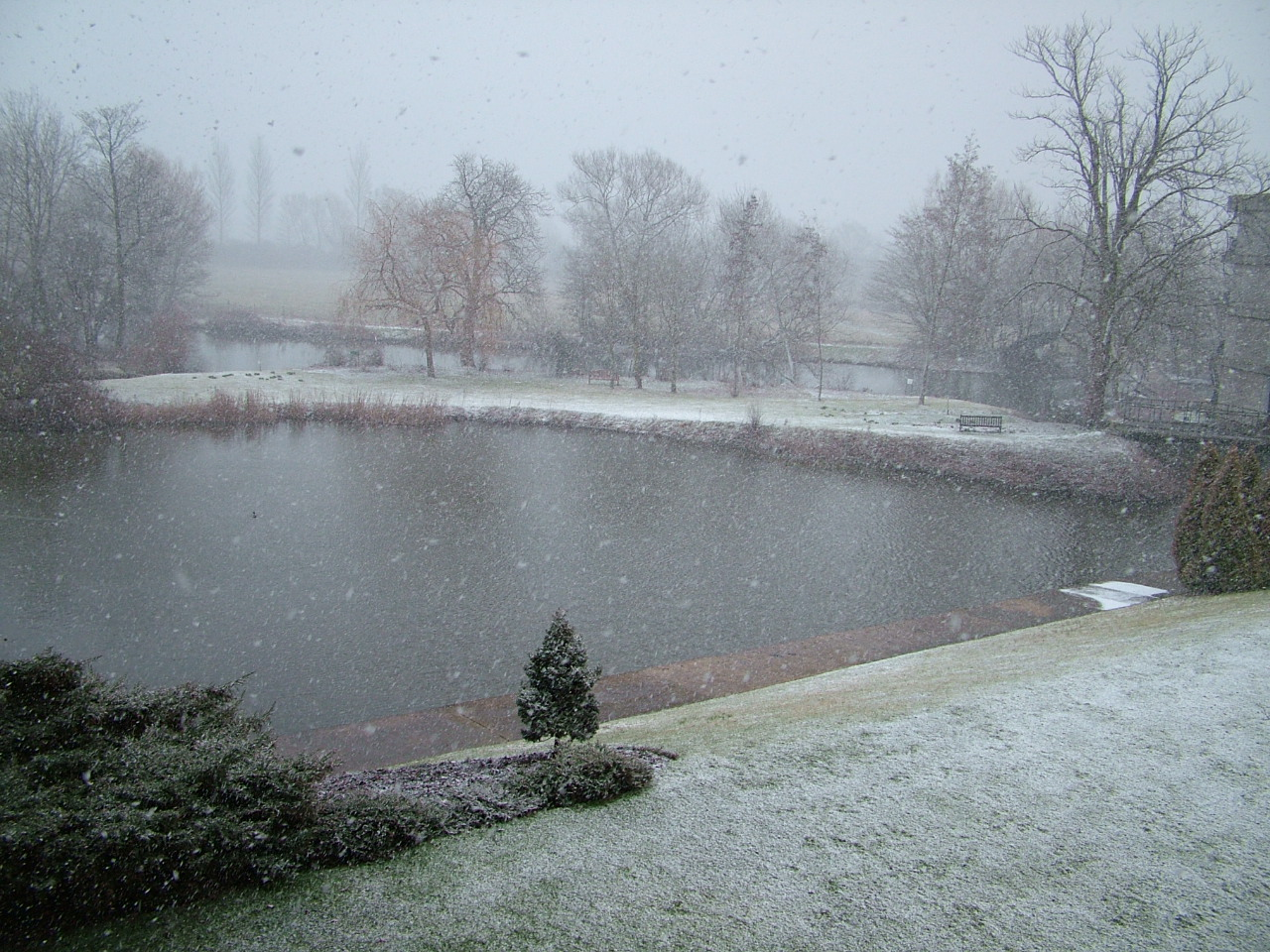
Wolfson's gardens during a snowy day

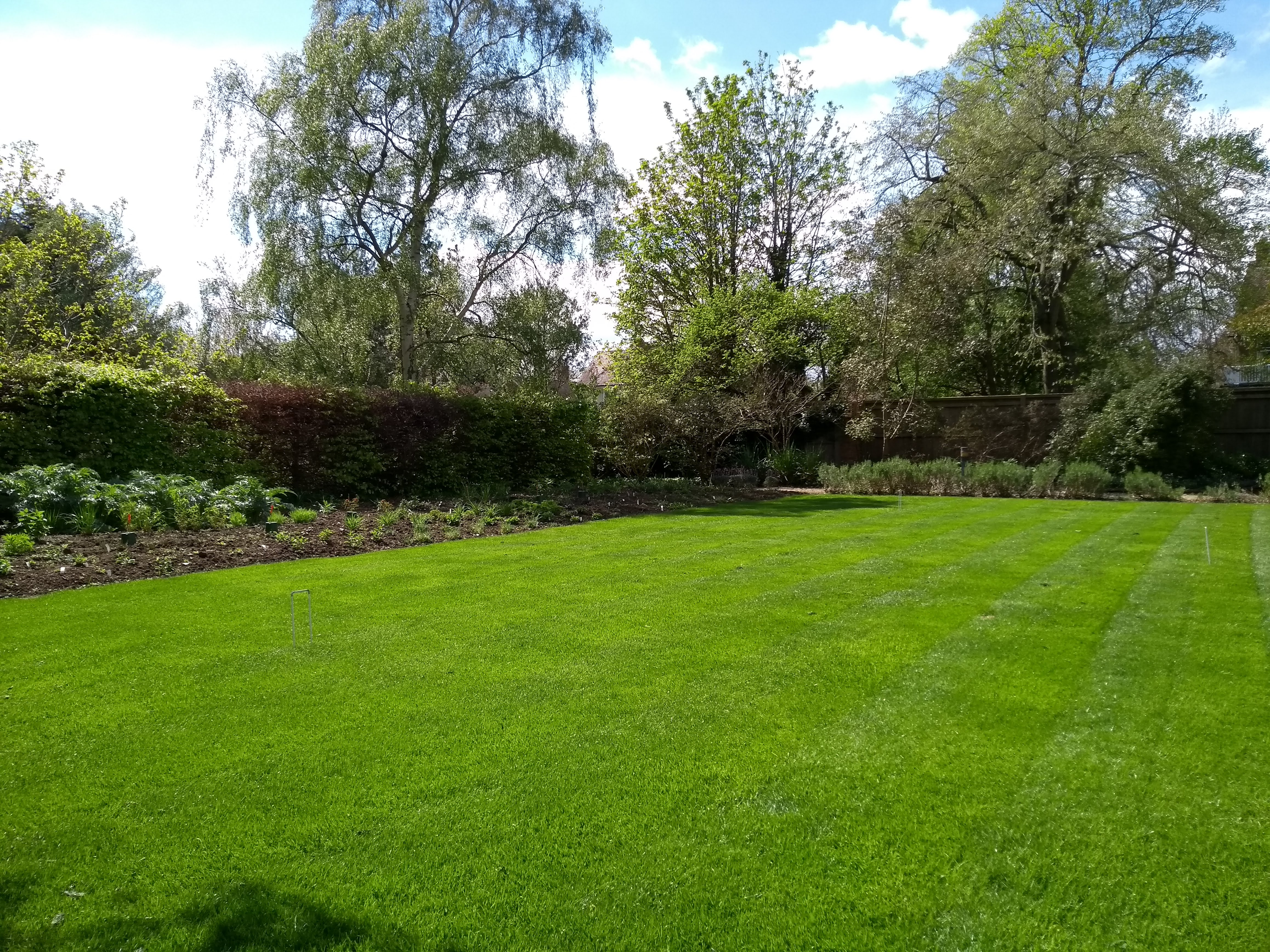
A small part of the gardens during a sunny day

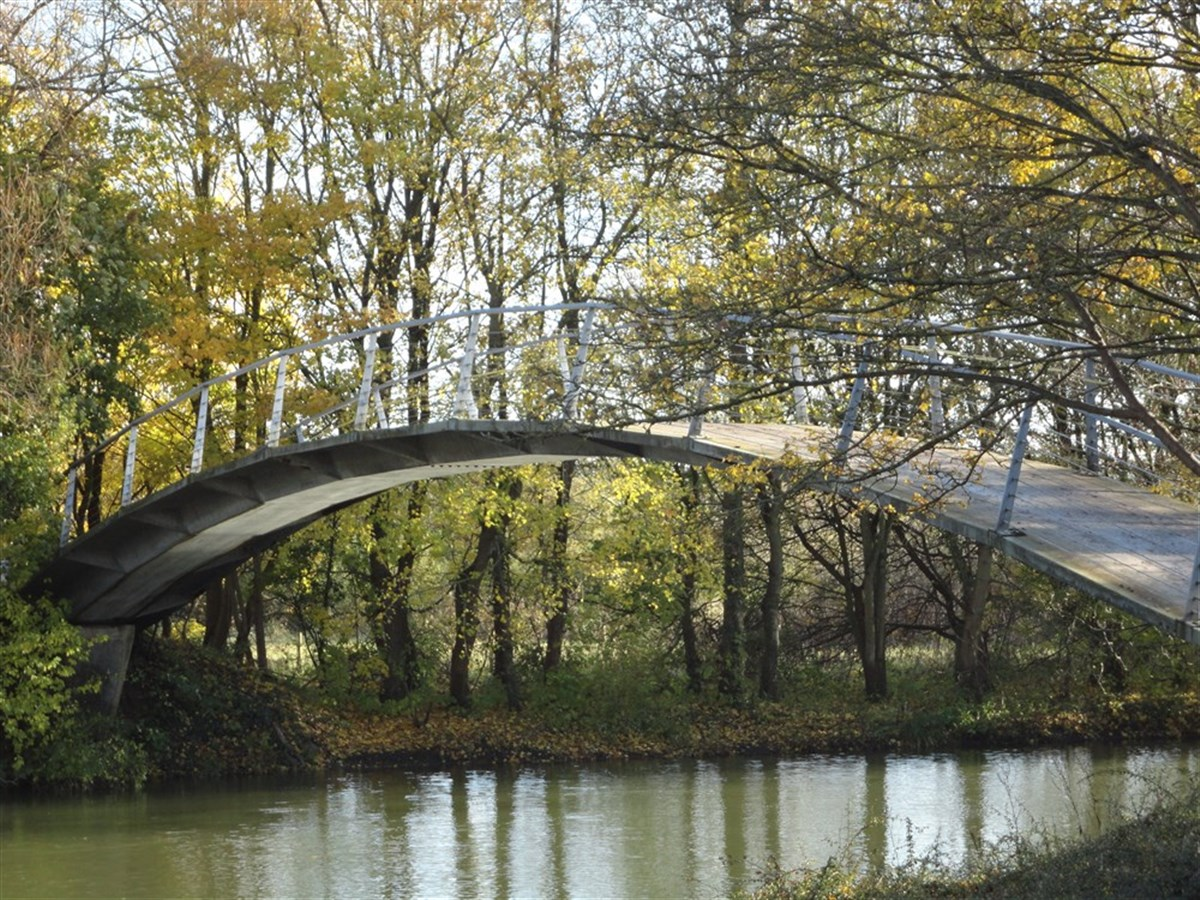
Wolfson bridge

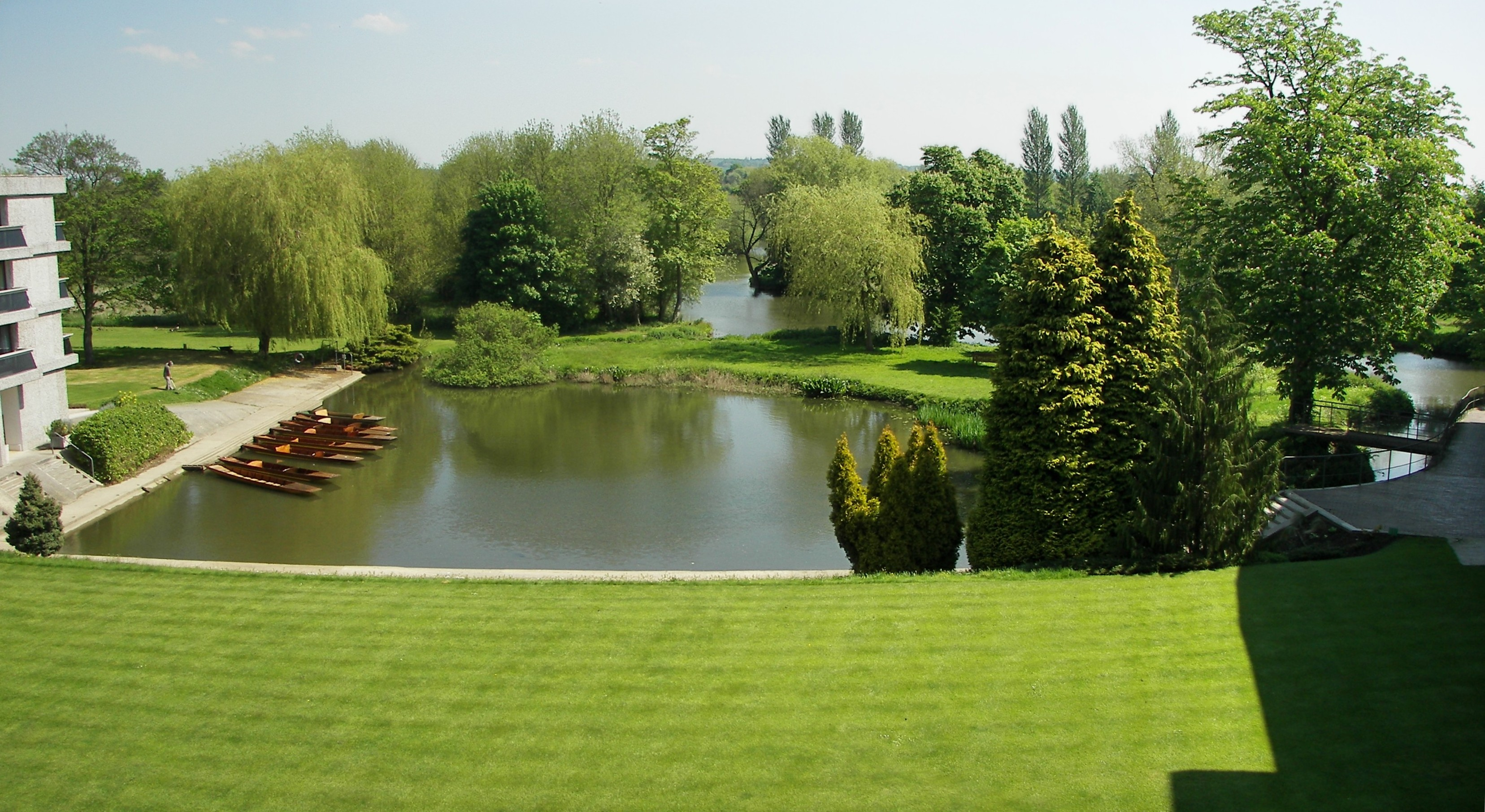
Wolfson's punting harbour and island

== Academic profile ==
In 2021, Wolfson had approximately 800 graduate students, many of whom were DPhil students. The remainder were studying for MPhil, MSc, MSc by Research, MSt, MSt by Research, MBA, EMBA, MLitt, MLitt by Research, BPhil, and Cert degrees. The college also accepts MJur and BCL candidates.

Wolfson is home to a number of research clusters:

- Ancient World Research Cluster (AWRC)
- The Oxford Centre for Life Writing (OCLW)
- Law in Societies
- South Asia Research Cluster (SARC)
- Earth Emergency Research Cluster
- Tibetan and Himalayan Studies Centre
- Quantum Foundations Research Cluster
- The Quantum Hub

It has also been home to the Centre for Socio-Legal Studies, which has now moved to an independent location in Oxford. The Foundation for Law, Justice and Society, which is affiliated with the college and the Centre for Socio-Legal Studies, was based there between 2005 and 2021.

== Notable people associated with Wolfson College ==
Wolfson is associated with a number of prominent individuals. These include former students, Fellows of the college and past presidents including two Nobel Prize winners. As Wolfson is a graduate-only college, most students will have been associated with another college or institution, before coming to study at Wolfson College for a Masters or DPhil degree.

=== Notable alumni ===
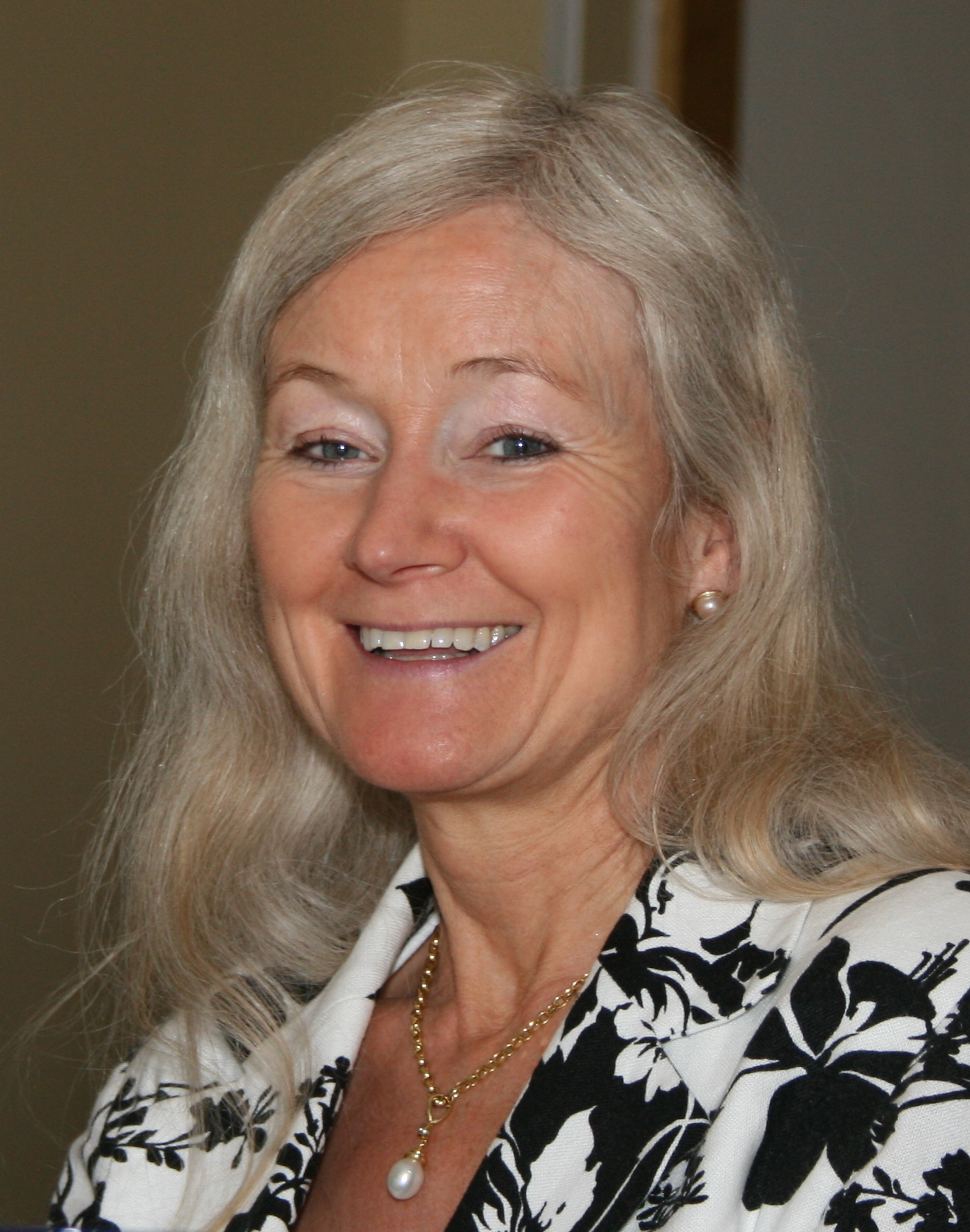
Kay Davies

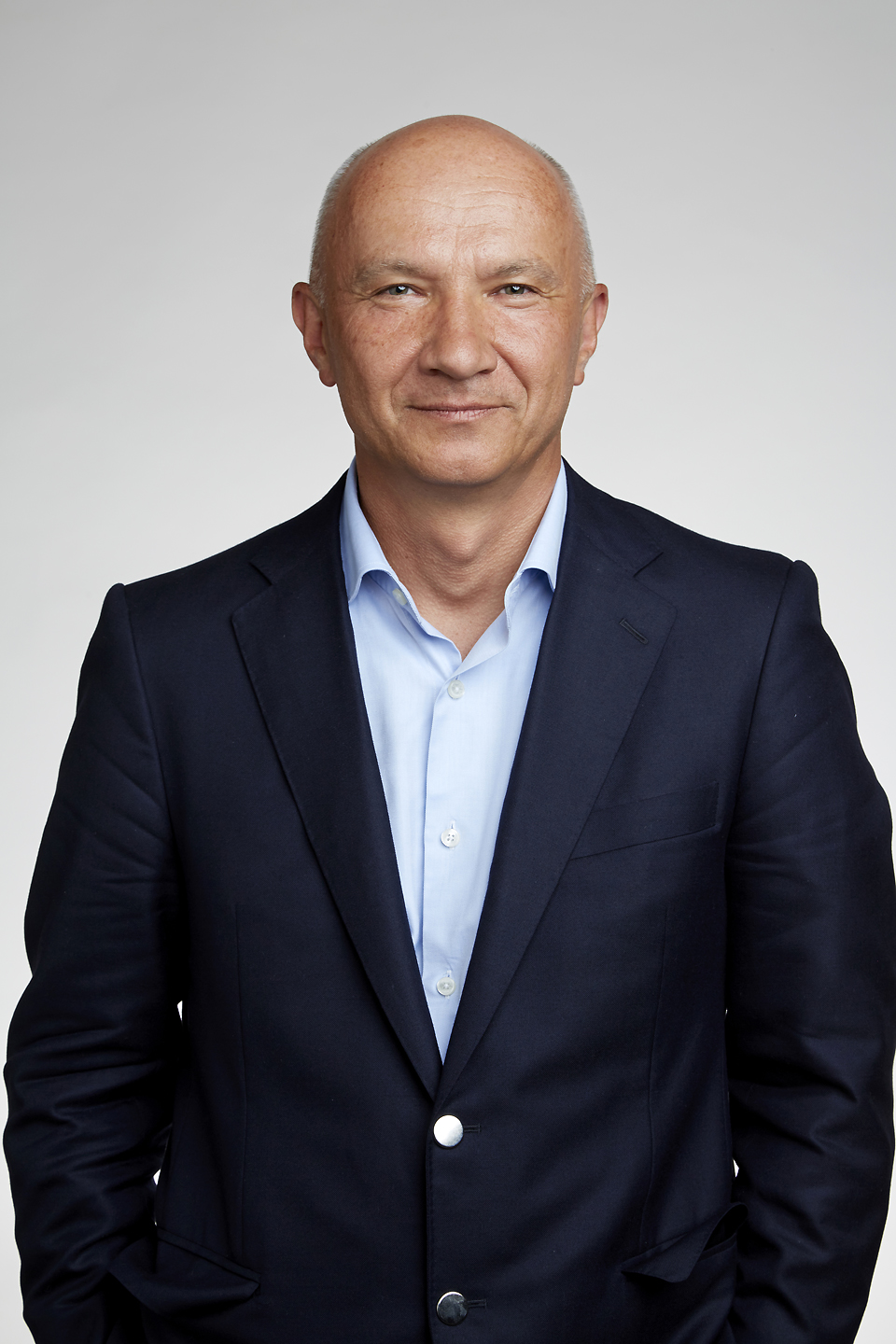
Artur Ekert

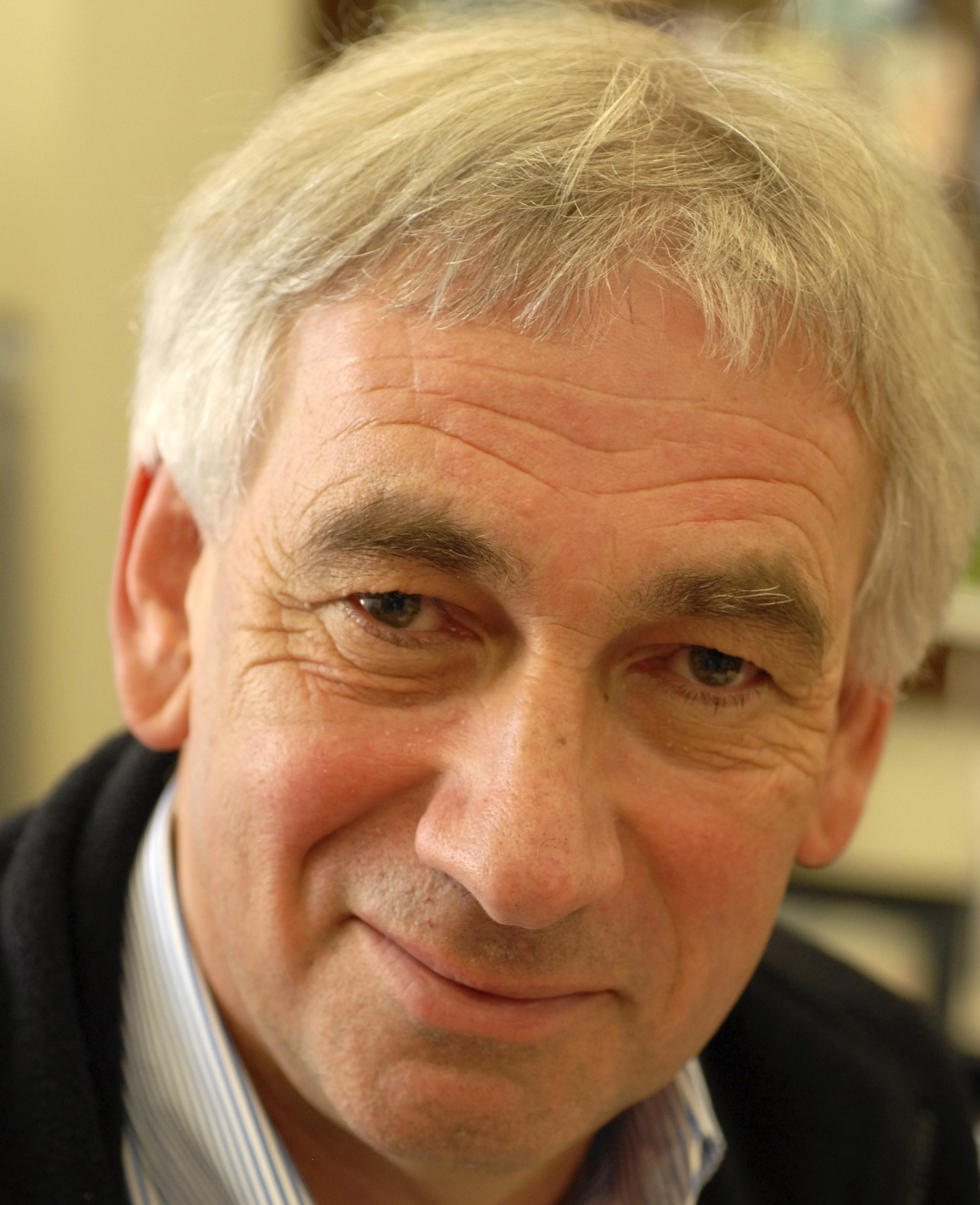
Richard Salisbury Ellis

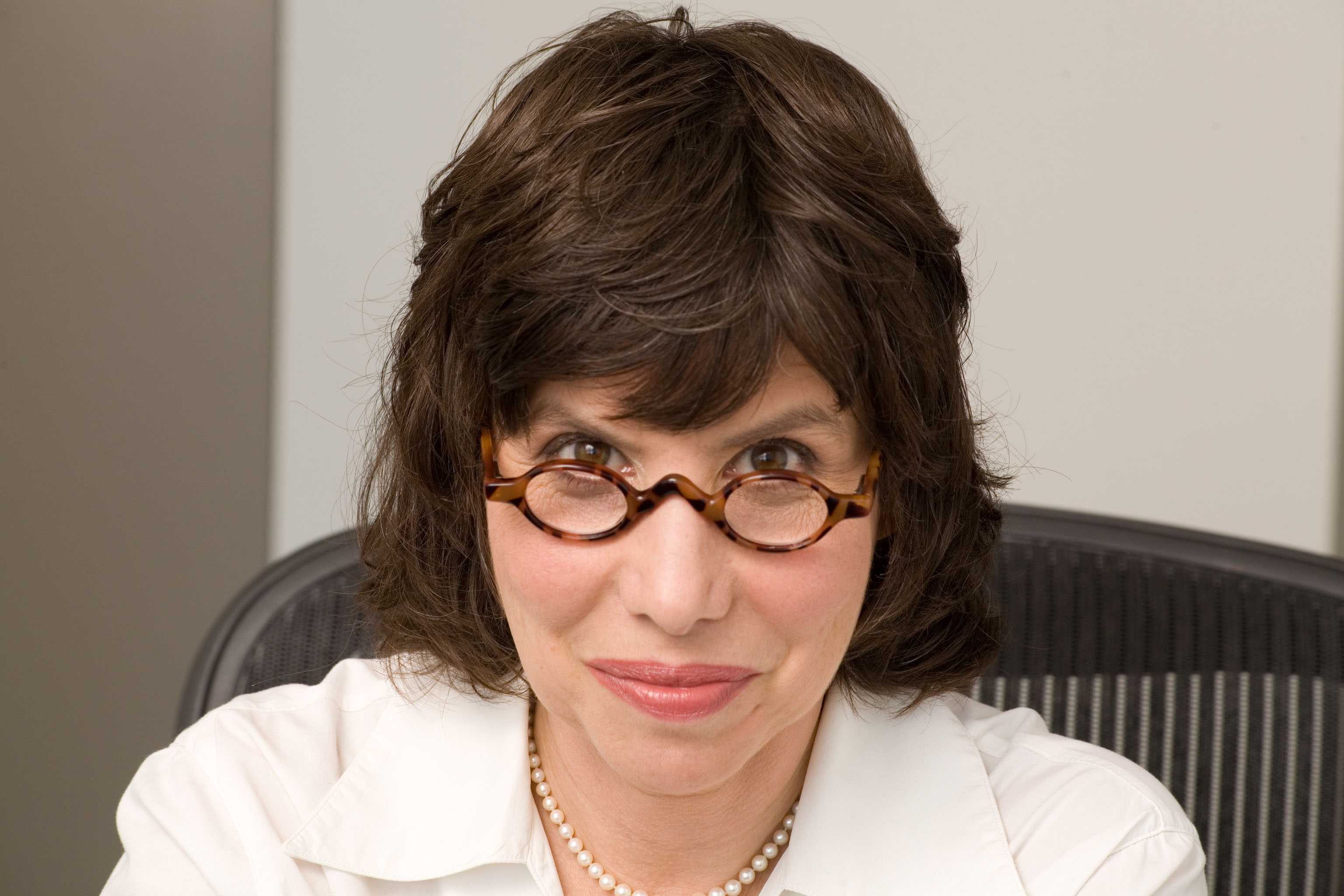
Alison Gopnik

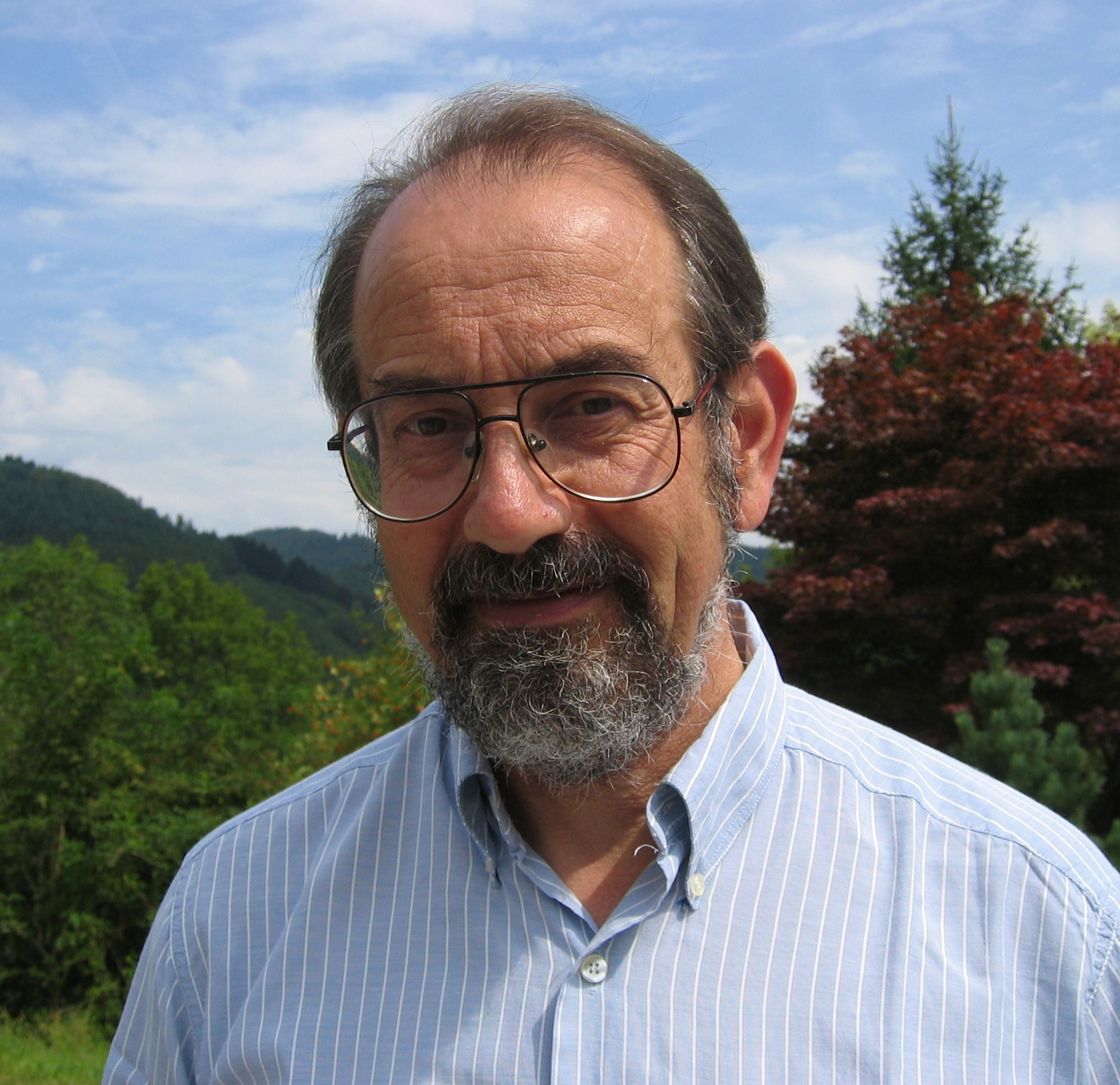
Nigel Hitchin

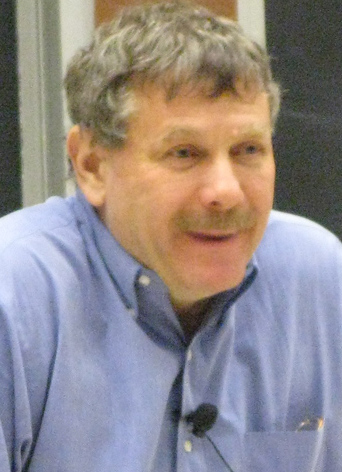
Eric Lander

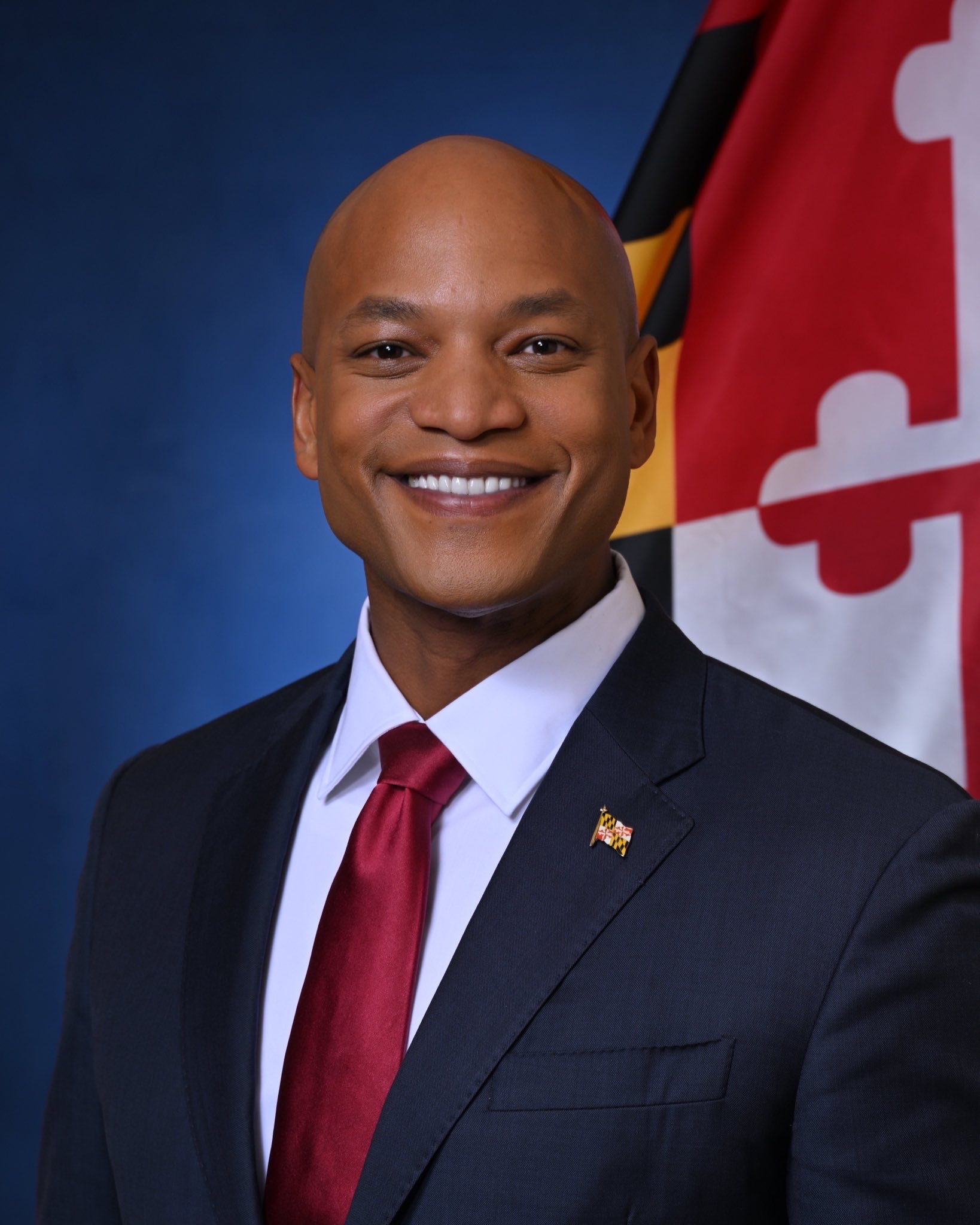
Wes Moore

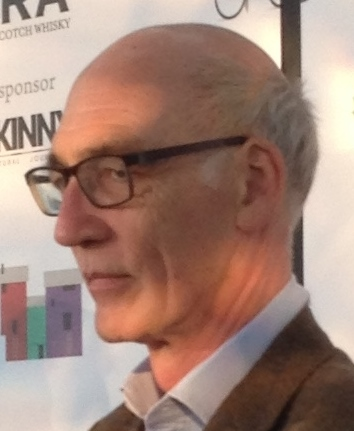
Iain Pears

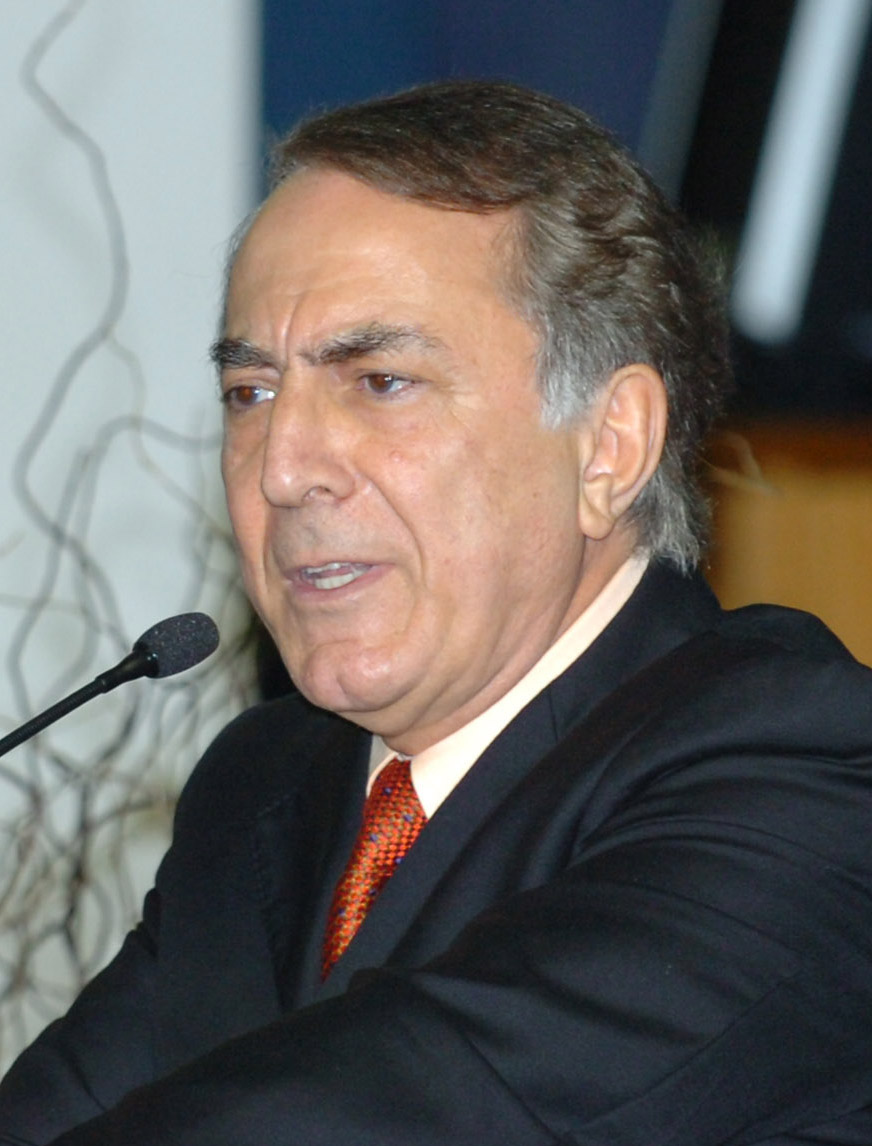
Francisco Rezek

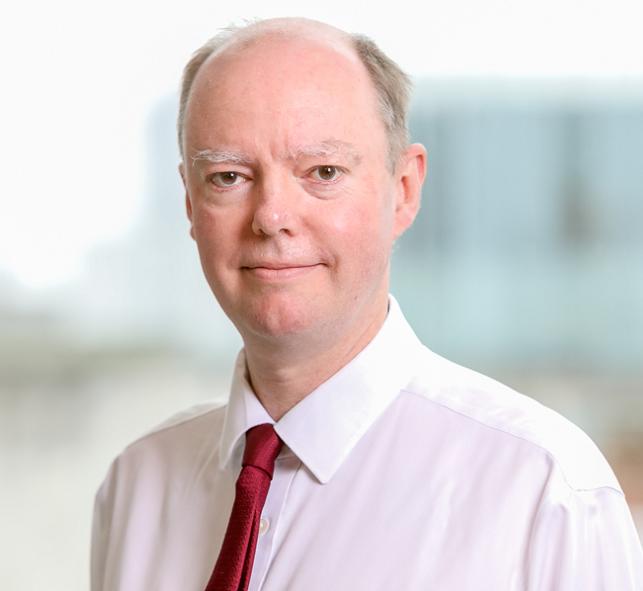
Chris Whitty

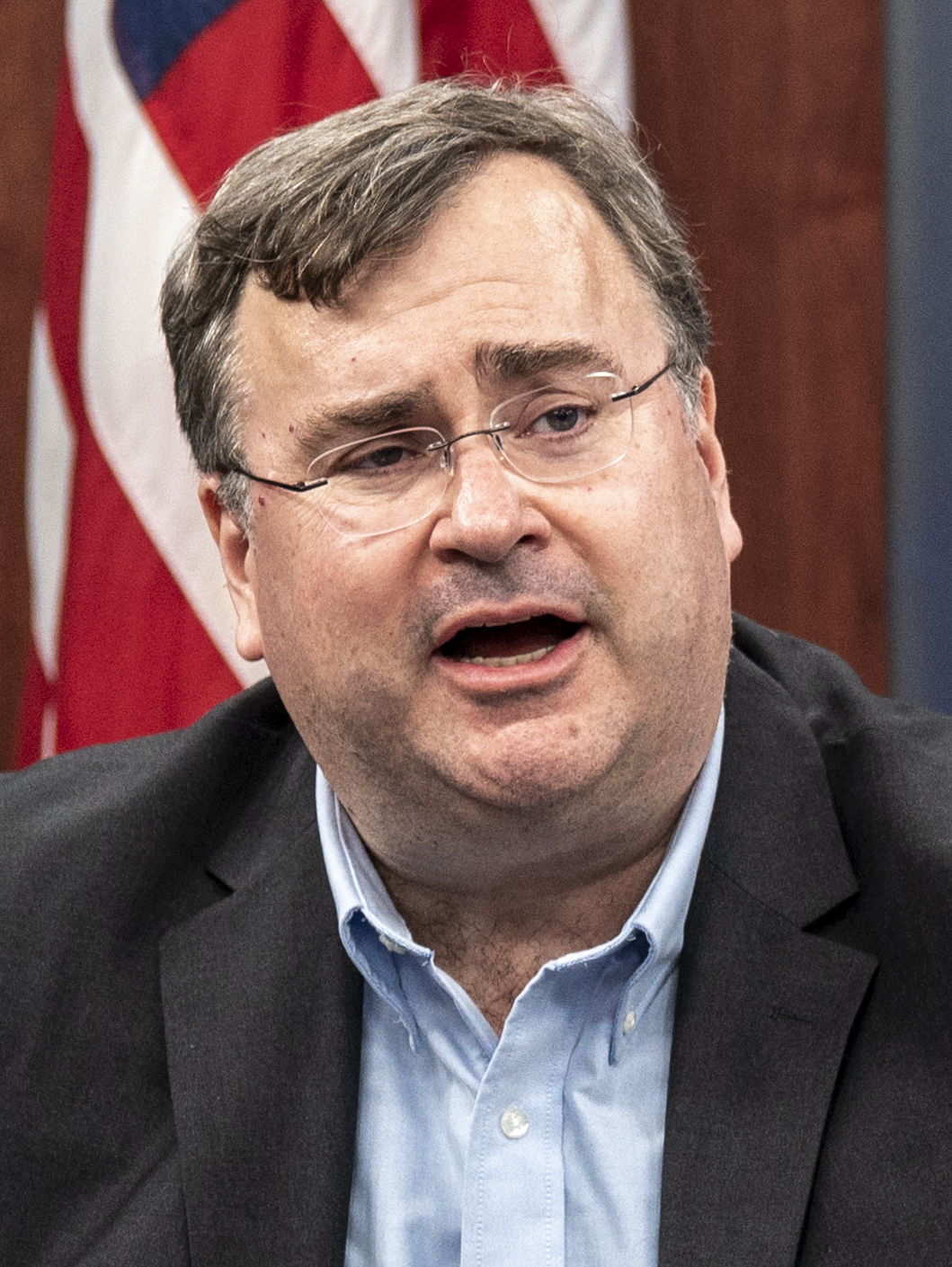
Reid Hoffman

In the sciences, alumni of the college include the human geneticist Dame Kay Davies, the astronomer and Caltech professor Richard Ellis, theoretical physicist David Deutsch, mathematician and geneticist Eric Lander and mathematician James R. Norris. Entrepreneurs include Reid Hoffman, who was the co-founder and executive chairman of LinkedIn.

In law and public policy, alumni include Chief Medical Adviser to the UK Government Chris Whitty, former minister of external relations of Brazil and Supreme Court Justice Francisco Rezek, chief prosecutor of the International Criminal Court Karim Ahmad Khan. Sigmundur Davíð Gunnlaugsson, the youngest serving prime minister of Iceland, studied at the college.

=== Presidents ===
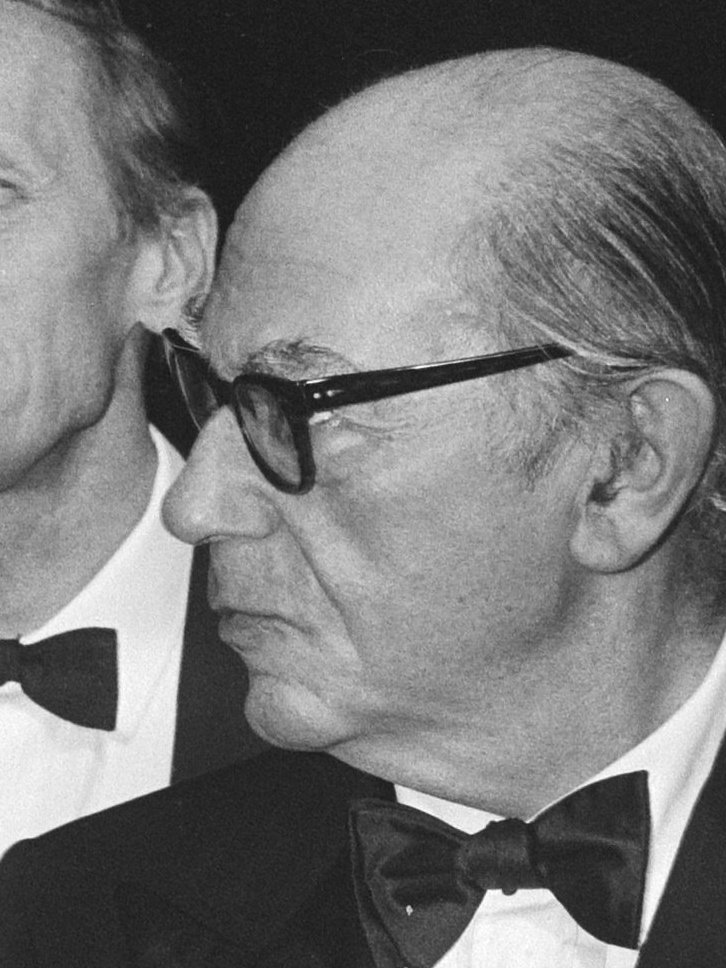
Isaiah Berlin

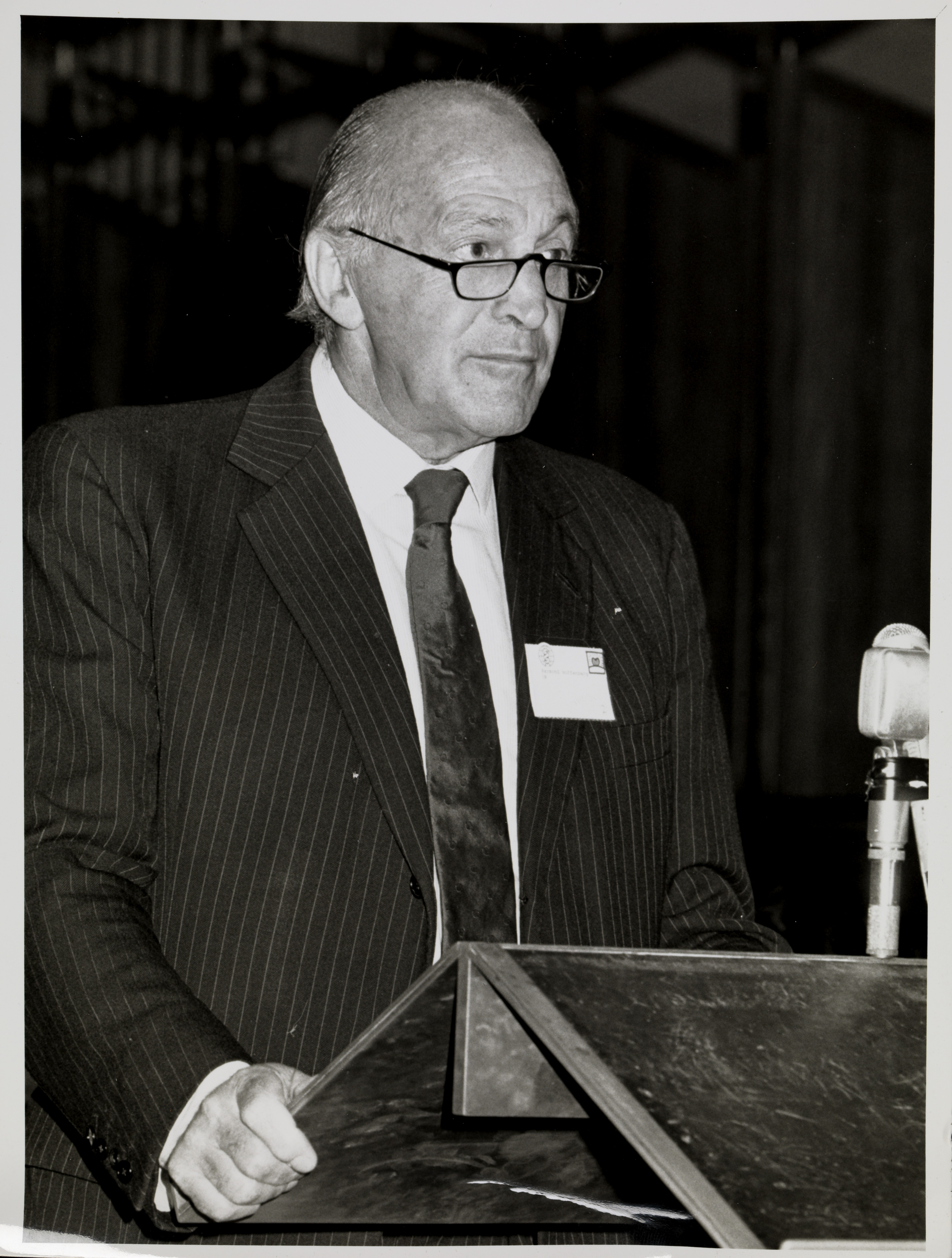
Raymond Hoffenberg

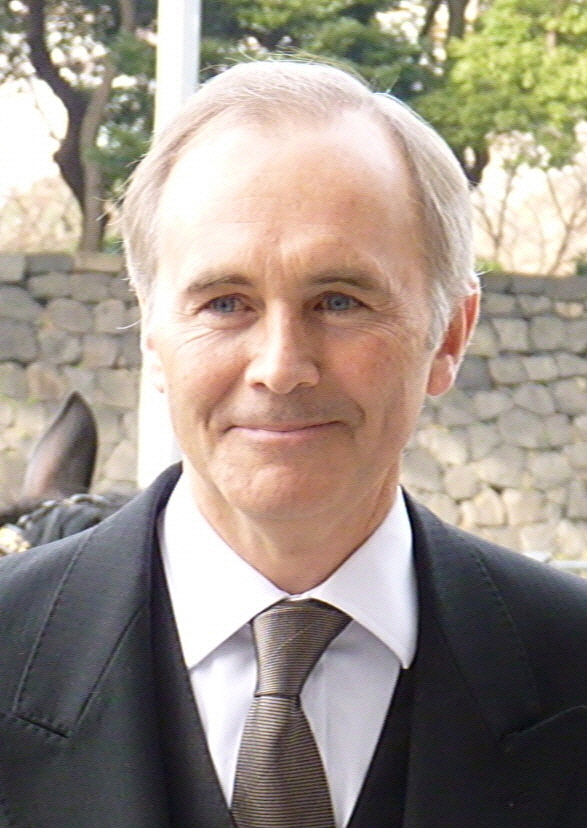
Tim Hitchens

=== Fellows ===
Notable current and former fellows of the college include:

- Samson Abramsky FRS, computer scientist.
- William Bradshaw, Baron Bradshaw, Member of the House of Lords.
- Jerome Bruner, American psychologist.
- Anthony Epstein, discoverer of the Epstein–Barr virus.
- Robin Gandy, mathematician and logician, associate of Alan Turing.
- Sir Tony Hoare FRS, computer scientist, known for Quicksort and Hoare logic.
- Dorothy Hodgkin FRS, winner of the Nobel Prize in Chemistry.
- Steven Schwartz, Vice Chancellor of Macquarie University in Sydney, Australia.
- Denis Mack Smith, historian.
- Ib Holm Sørensen, Danish computer scientist, known for work on formal methods.
- Niko Tinbergen FRS, Dutch ethologist and recipient of the Nobel Prize in Physiology or Medicine.
- Jiyuan Yu, moral philosopher, known for work on virtue ethics.
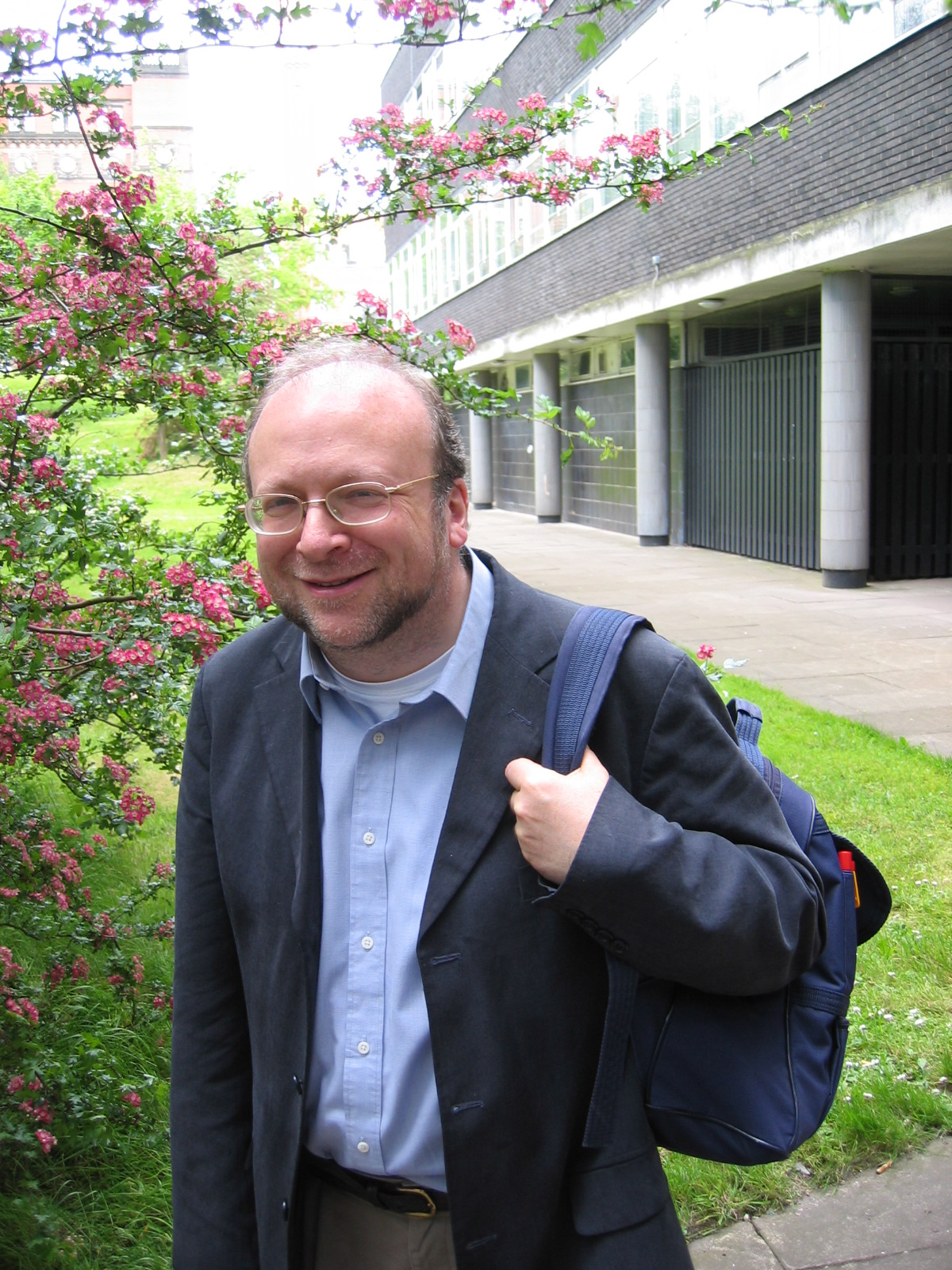
Samson Abramsky

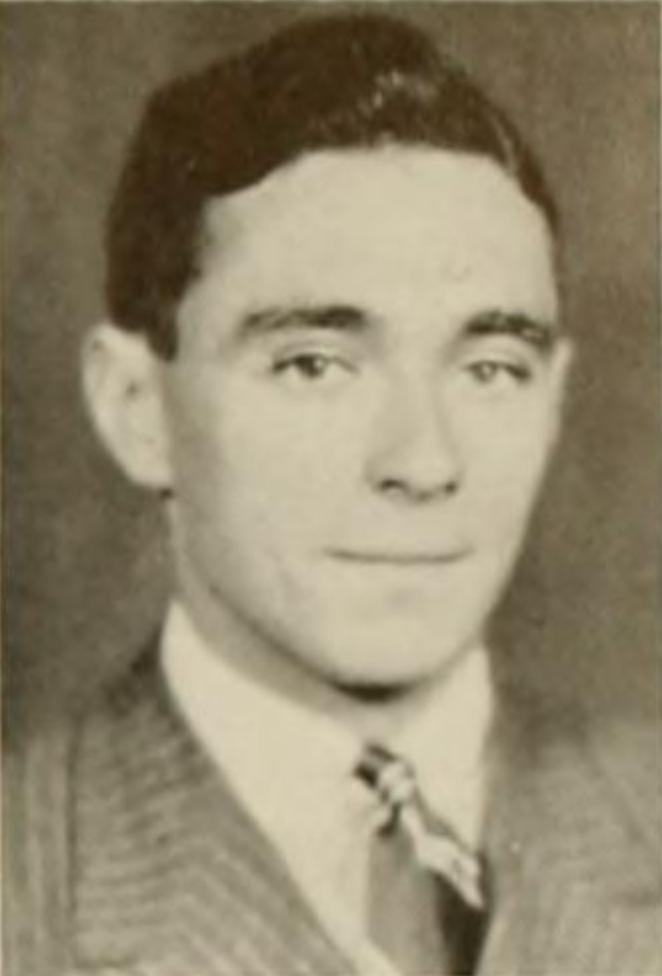
Jerome Bruner

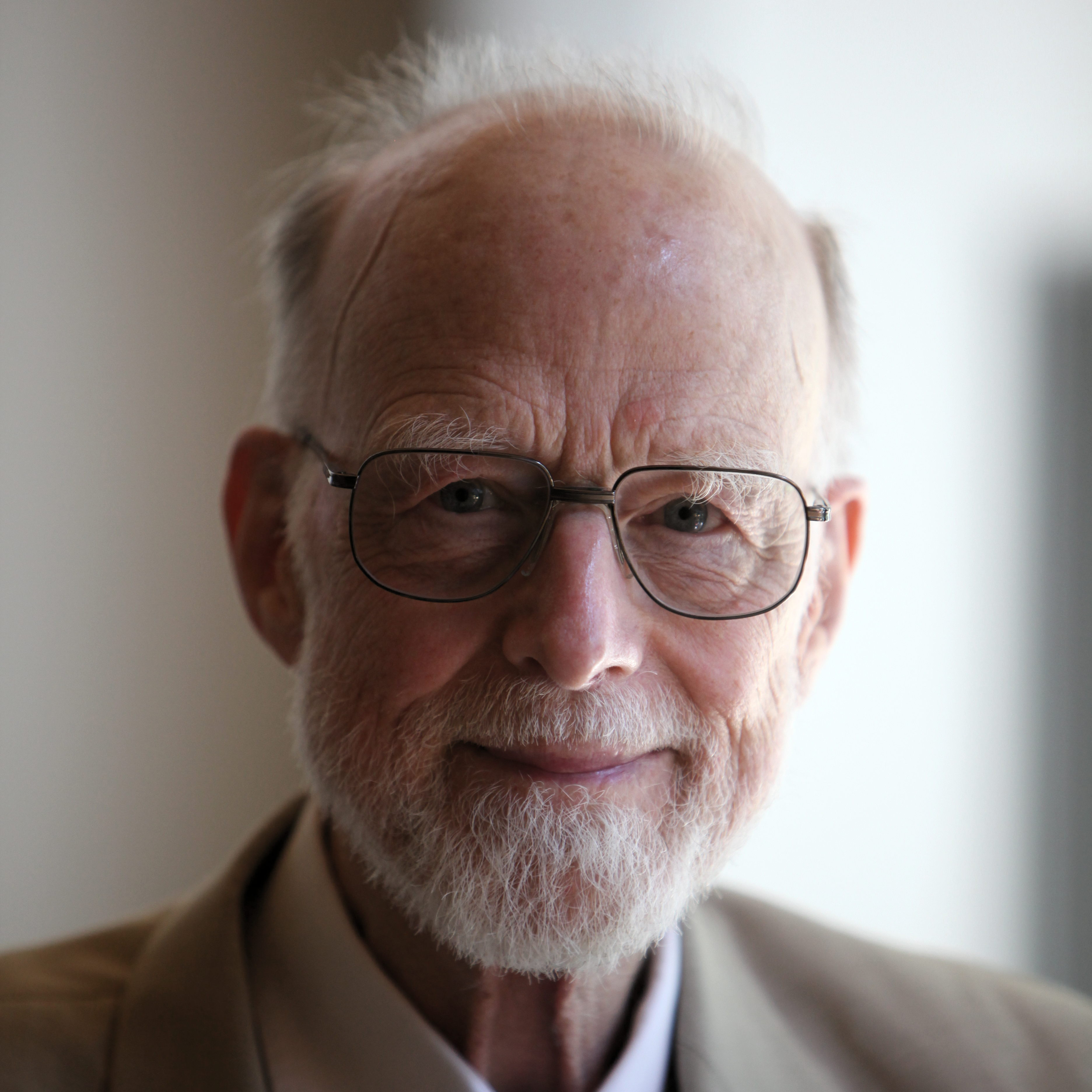
Tony Hoare

Dorothy Hodgkin

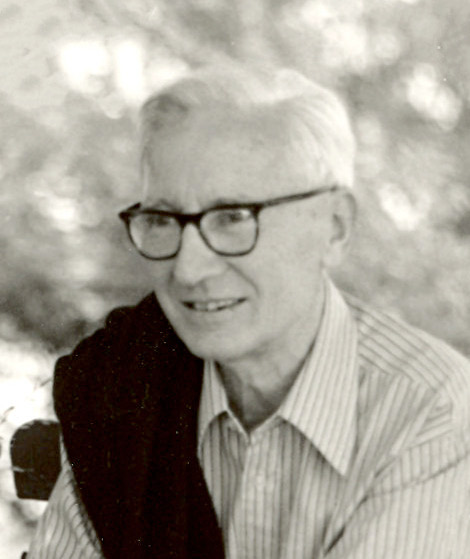
Nikolaas Tinbergen

== See also ==
- List of honorary fellows of Wolfson College, Oxford
- Wolfson College, Cambridge
- Wolfson family

== Bibliography ==
- Hardy, Henry; Hiruta, Kei; Holmes, Jennifer, eds. (6 June 2009). Isaiah Berlin & Wolfson College. Wolfson College, Oxford.
- McDonald, Alison W. (1992). A history of ecology of North and South Meads. Wolfson College, Oxford.
- Penney, John; Tomlin, Roger, eds. (2016). Wolfson College, Oxford: The First Fifty Years. Wolfson College, Oxford.
