= John Fisher (disambiguation) =

Saint John Fisher (c. 1469–1535) was an English religious leader.

John or Jack Fisher may also refer to:

== Entertainment ==
- John Fisher the elder, and John Fisher the younger (sculptors) (1760s–1839), father and son sculptors in York, England
- John Abraham Fisher (1744–1806), English violinist
- John Fisher (opera director) (born 1950), Scottish opera director
- John Fisher (EastEnders)

== Politics ==
- John Fisher (writer) (died 1590), bailiff of Warwick and writer, MP for Warwick 1571, 1572, 1584
- John Fisher (North American politician) (1806–1882), politician in Canada and the United States
- John Fisher (New Zealand politician) (1837–1927), New Zealand politician
- John Henry Fisher (1855–1933), Ontario merchant and politician
- John Stuchell Fisher (1867–1940), American politician in Pennsylvania

== Religion ==
- John Fisher (bishop of Salisbury) (1748–1825), English religious leader
- John Fisher (priest) (1788–1832), Archdeacon of Berkshire

== Science ==
- John William Fisher (1788–1876), British surgeon
- John Dix Fisher (1797–1850), American physician, founder of Perkins School for the Blind
- John W. Fisher (born 1931), American professor of civil engineering
- John Bradford Fisher (born 1953), cosmetic surgeon
- John Fisher (biomedical engineer), British biomedical engineer

== Sports ==
- John Fisher (businessman) (born 1961), American owner of the Athletics of Major League Baseball
- John Fisher (footballer and cricketer) (1897–1954), English association football and cricket player
- John Fisher (footballer, born 1937) (1937–1998), Australian rules footballer
- John Fisher (footballer, born 1941), Australian rules footballer
- John Fisher (ice hockey) (born 1947), Canadian minor league centre
- John Fisher (boxer) (born 1942), Scottish boxer

== Other people ==
- John Fisher (Delaware judge) (1771–1823), District Court judge
- John Charlton Fisher (1794–1849), Canadian author and journalist
- John Harvey Fisher (1837–1895), Union Army officer and Medal of Honor recipient
- John Fisher, 1st Baron Fisher (1841–1920), British admiral
- John Fisher (Australian journalist) (1910–1960)
- John Hurt Fisher (1919–2015), American professor of English
- John R. Fisher (born 1946), District of Columbia Court of Appeals judge
- John Fisher (social media personality) (born 1973)

== Schools ==
=== England ===
- Ss John Fisher and Thomas More Roman Catholic High School, Colne, England
- St John Fisher Catholic College, in Newcastle-under-Lyme, Staffordshire, England
- St John Fisher Catholic High School, Harrogate, England
- St John Fisher Catholic High School, Wigan, England
- St John Fisher Catholic School, in Chatham, Kent, England
- St John Fisher Catholic Voluntary Academy, Dewsbury, England
- The John Fisher School, boys secondary school in Purley, England

=== Elsewhere ===
- St. John Fisher College (University of Tasmania), in Australia
- St. John Fisher University, in New York

== See also ==
- John Fischer (disambiguation)
- Jonathan Fisher (disambiguation)
- Jackie Fisher (disambiguation)
- Johann Fischer (disambiguation)
