= Jackie Fisher =

Jackie Fisher may refer to:

- John Fisher, 1st Baron Fisher (1841–1920), or Jacky Fisher, British admiral
- John Fisher (footballer and cricketer) (1897–1954), or Jackie Fisher, English association football and cricket player
- Jackie Fisher (footballer, born 1925) (1925–2022), English footballer

== See also ==
- John Fisher (disambiguation)
