= Jonathan Fisher =

Jonathan Fisher may refer to:

- Jonathan Fisher (preacher) (1768–1847), American religious leader, artist, farmer, and naturalist
- Jonathan Fisher (painter) (c. 1740–1809), Irish painter and engraver
- Jonathan Fisher (priest) (1757–1838), Archdeacon of Barnstaple
- Jonathan Fisher (barrister) (fl. 2010s–2020s), English lawyer
- Jonathan Fisher (Jeopardy! contestant) (fl. 2020s), American quiz show contestant

== See also ==
- John Fisher (disambiguation)
- Jonathan Fischer (born 2001), Danish footballer
