= Johann Fischer =

Johann Fischer may refer to:

== Entertainment ==
- Johann Georg Fischer (painter) (1580–1643), German historical painter
- Johann Fischer (theologian) (1636–1705), German Lutheran theologian
- Johann Fischer (composer) (1646–1716), German violinist, pianist, and composer of the Baroque era
- Johann Caspar Ferdinand Fischer (1656–1746), German Baroque composer
- Johann Christian Fischer (1733–1800), German composer and oboist
- Johann Ignaz Ludwig Fischer (c. 1745–1825), German opera singer
- Johann Georg Fischer (1816–1897), German poet and playwright

== Science ==
- Johann Bernhard Fischer (1685–1772), German doctor, medical adviser to Empress Anna
- Johann Fischer von Waldheim (1771–1853), German anatomist, entomologist, and paleontologist
- Johann Conrad Fischer (1773–1854), Swiss metallurgist
- Johann Nepomuk Fischer (1777–1847), Austrian ophthalmologist
- Johann Baptist Fischer (1803–1832), German naturalist, zoologist, and botanist
- Johann Gustav Fischer (1819–1889), German herpetologist

== Other ==
- Johann Bernhard Fischer von Erlach (1656–1723), Austrian architect, sculptor, and architectural historian
- Johann Michael Fischer (1692–1766), German architect in the late Baroque period
- Johann Erhard Fischer (1817–1884), German Lutheran pastor

== See also ==
- John Fischer (disambiguation)
- John Fisher (disambiguation)
- Johannes Fischer (1887–?), German physicist
