= Governors' Garden =

Urban park in Quebec City, Quebec

- Jardin des Gouverneurs
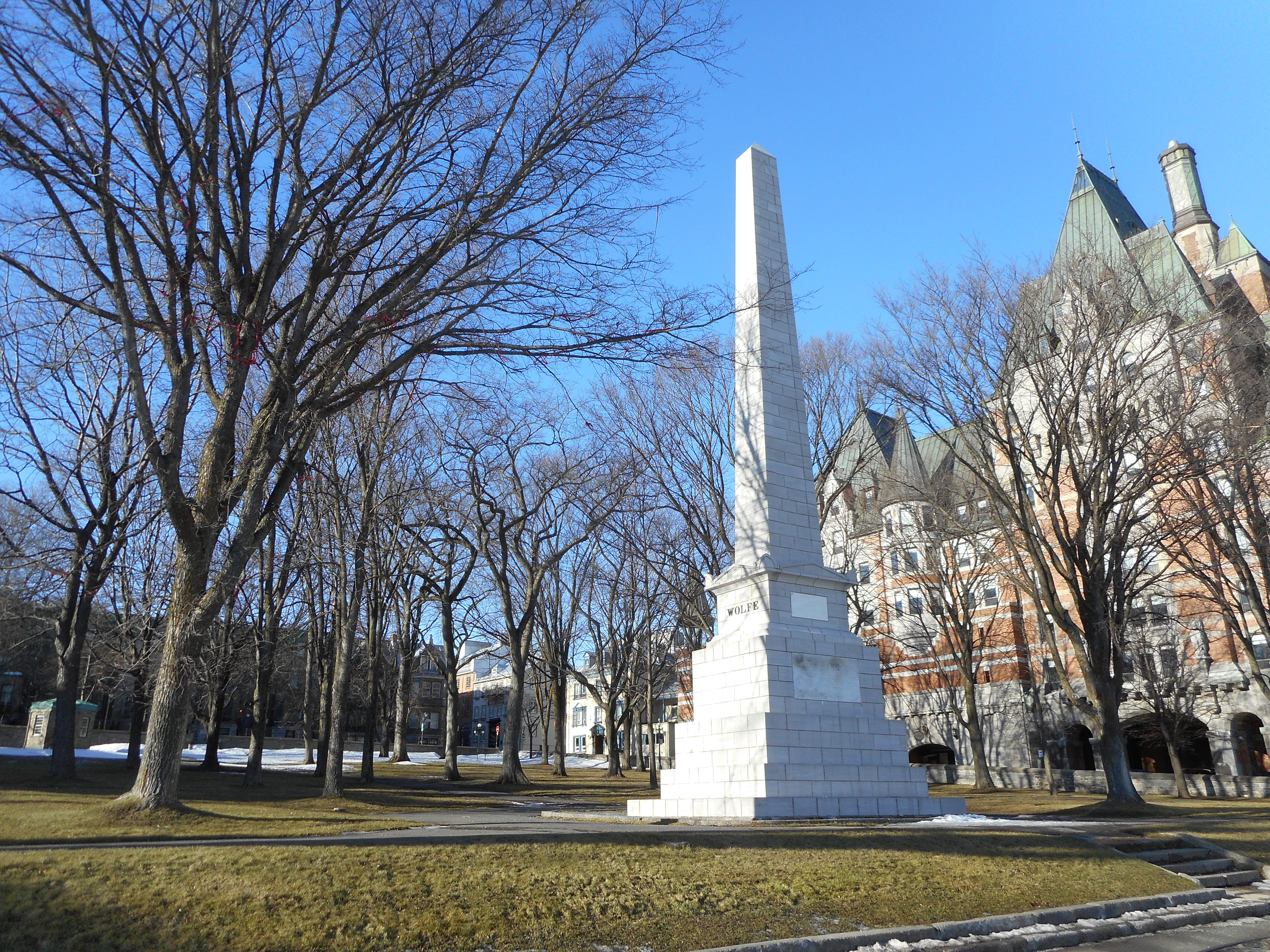
- The Wolfe–Montcalm Monument at the eastern edge of the garden, with the Château Frontenac in the background (2014)
- Interactive map of Governors' Garden
- Type: Urban park
- Location: Quebec City, Quebec, Canada
- Coordinates: 46.8109223°N 71.2056720°W
- Area: 750 square metres (8,100 sq ft)
- Created: c. 1800 (226 years ago)

Governors' Garden (French: Jardin des Gouverneurs) is an urban park in Quebec City, Quebec, Canada. Designed by Robert Desjardins, the garden is located immediately to the south of Château Frontenac and is bounded by Rue Mont-Carmel to the north, Rue des Carrières to the east, Avenue Sainte-Geneviève to the south, and Rue de la Porte to the west. It is 750 square metres (8,100 sq ft) in area. The park overlooks the St. Lawrence River to the east, beyond Dufferin Terrace.

It was redeveloped in 2000 as a reference to gardens that existed around the city during the time of Claude de Ramezay in the first half of the 18th century. In 1731, there were almost 200 gardens in Quebec City, but many succumbed to building construction.

The garden is in the formal French style, and is divided into three equal-sized sections: a kitchen garden (potager), an orchard (verger) and a pleasure garden (jardin ornamental). Surrounding these sections, at the foot of the long walls, is a fourth section consisting of herbs and medicinal plants informally distributed. A ram's-head fountain is part of the garden and serves as a reminder of the importance of wells in the gardens of yore, for they were the only handy source of water for the gardener.

The Wolfe–Montcalm Monument, unveiled in 1828, stands at the eastern edge of the park, on Rue des Carrières.

== Surrounding buildings ==
Several notable buildings surround the park on its three enclosed sides.

Rue Mont-Carmel (north)

- 16 Rue Mont-Carmel – the only building other than Château Frontenac on this stretch of the street, this townhouse, at the corner of Rue Haldimand, has been a hotel or bed and breakfast, including the Hotel Château de Lery up until the COVID-19 pandemic. It has also been the Au Jardin du Gouverneur

Rue de la Porte (west)

- a terrace of seven buildings, including the Hôtel Château Bellevue at number 16

Avenue Sainte-Geneviève (south)

- 1 Avenue Sainte-Geneviève, home of the United States Consulate General in Quebec City (1952)
- 9 Avenue Sainte-Geneviève, Hotel Manoir Sur le Cap
- 13 Avenue Sainte-Geneviève, Manoir Ste-Geneviève

== Gallery ==
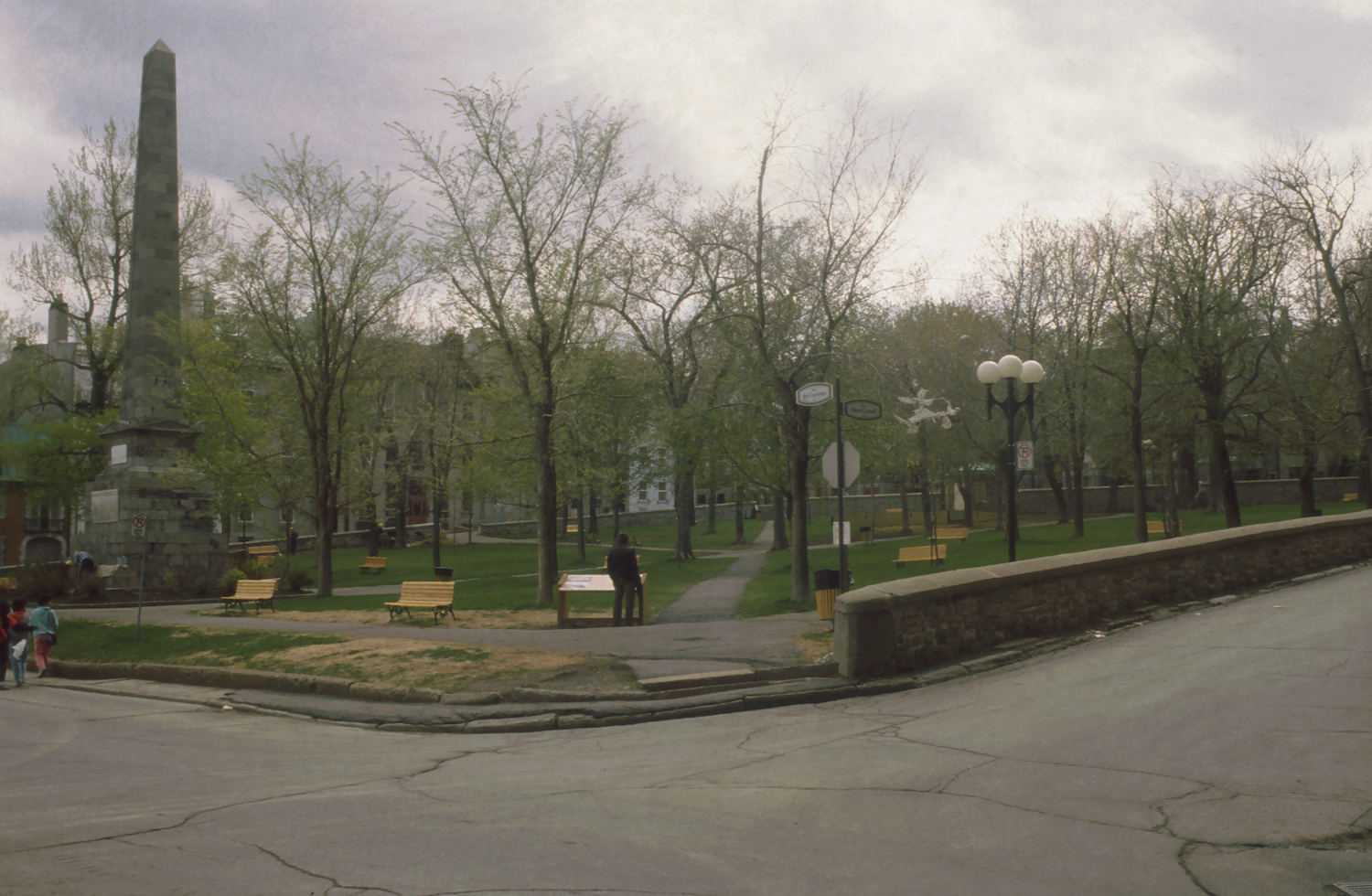
A view from the northeastern corner of the park in 1987, prior to the whitewashing of the Wolfe-Montcalm Monument
