= Maschinenfabrik Rüti =

Swiss weaving machine manufacturer

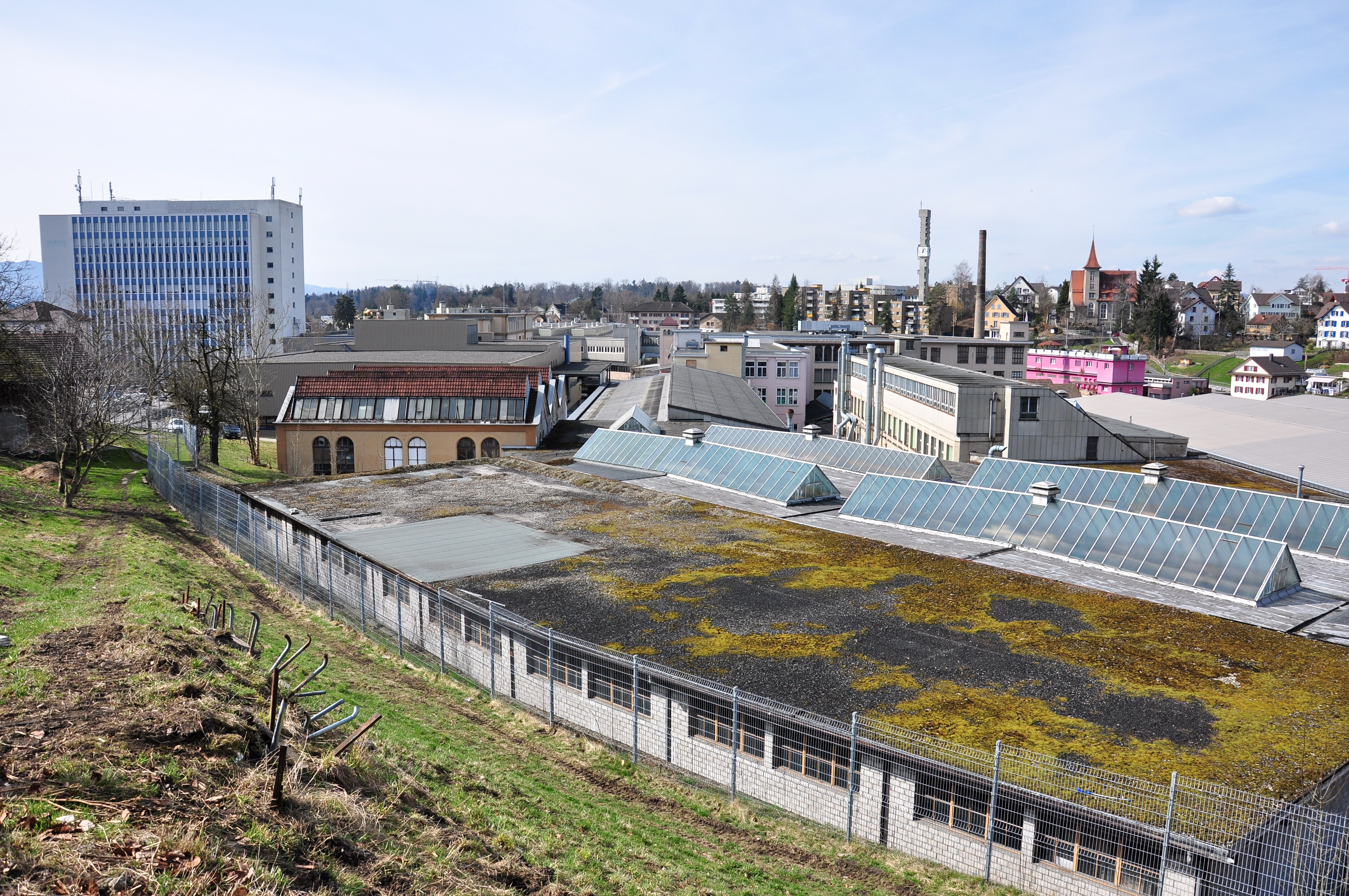
- Type: Joint-stock company
- Industry: Mechanical engineering
- Founded: 1842 in Siebnen, Switzerland
- Founder: Caspar Honegger
- Fate: Absorbed into Sulzer Textil Ltd
- Headquarters: Rüti, Switzerland
- Products: Weaving machines
- Number of employees: ~2,080 (1929)
- Parent: Georg Fischer (1969–1982), Sulzer (from 1982)

The Maschinenfabrik Rüti was a Swiss machine manufacturer based in Rüti, known for producing weaving machines. It grew from a mechanical workshop founded in 1842 into one of the world's leading makers of weaving machinery before being absorbed by larger industrial groups in the late 20th century.

== History ==
The company was founded in 1842 by Caspar Honegger at Siebnen as a mechanical workshop producing the Honegger loom. In 1847 production was moved to Rüti, where the company's expansion drew many workers from central Switzerland and Italy. After the founder's death, the firm Caspar Honegger in Rüti was converted in 1886 into the joint-stock company Maschinenfabrik Rüti, which became a world leader in the production of weaving machines.

The first foreign agencies were established in neighboring countries from 1890, then from 1914 in Moscow, Manchester, Damascus, and Constantinople, among others, and after 1930 mainly in South America, India, South Africa, and Australia. Among its most innovative products were the automatic looms developed from 1898, around 1935 the first weaving machines without a superstructure, and from 1966 the shuttleless air-jet weaving machines, which by 1982 accounted for a quarter of the world market share.

The company was taken over by Georg Fischer (+GF+) in 1969 and by Sulzer in 1982. Unsuccessful new developments were followed from 1996 by waves of layoffs and the abandonment of the Rüti label. After 2003 only the management of Sulzer Textil Ltd, integrated into the Italian Itema Group, remained in Rüti.

The number of employees was 677 in 1886, 1,566 in 1914, 2,080 in 1929, 2,050 in 1967, 650 in 1998, and about 100 in 2003.

== Bibliography ==
- 100 Jahre Honegger-Webstühle, 1942
- 125 Jahre Webereimaschinen, 1967
