= Wolfe–Montcalm Monument =

Monument in Quebec City

- Canada
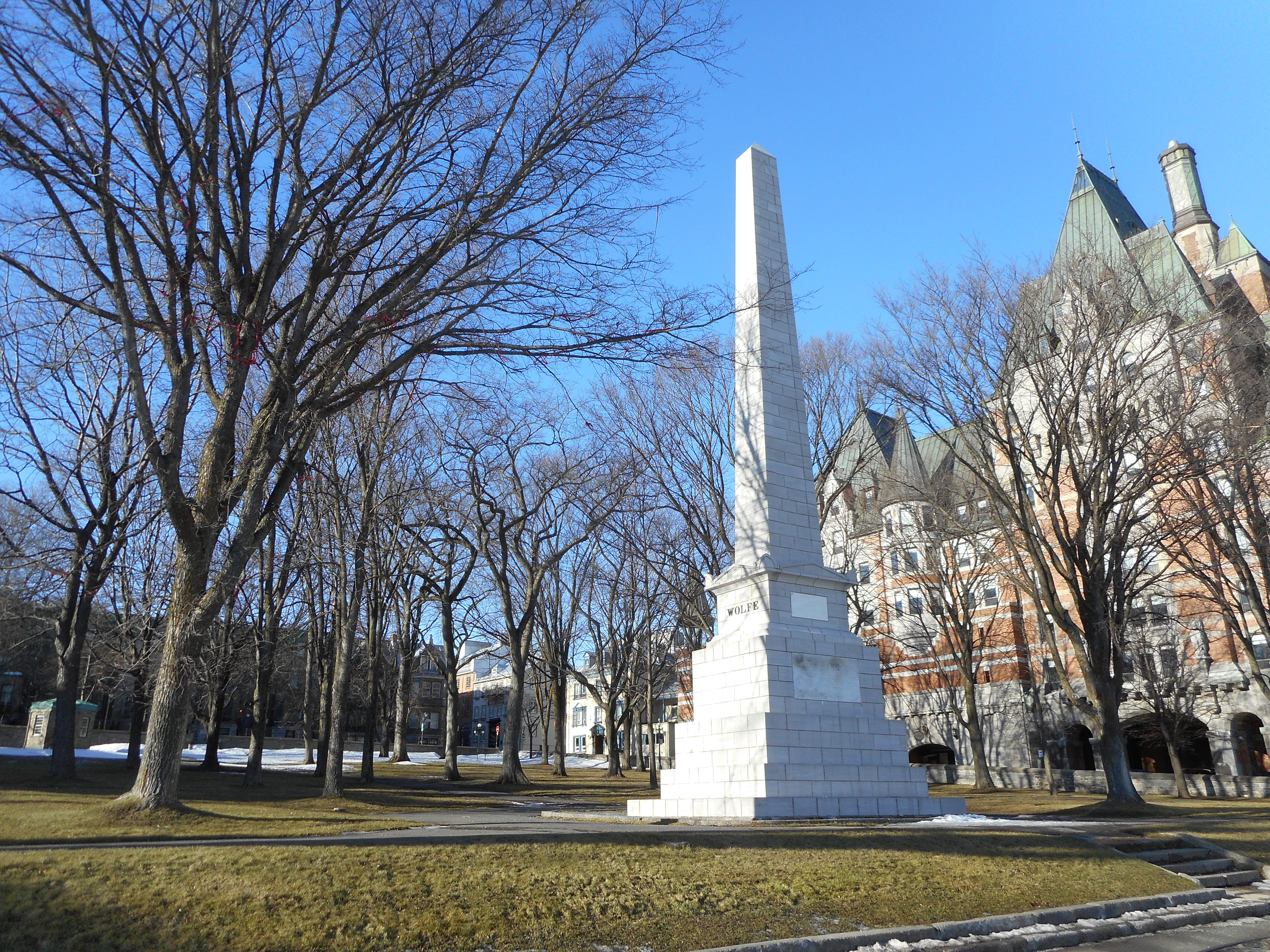
- The memorial in 2017
- For two generals who fought and died in the Battle of the Plains of Abraham
- Unveiled: 1828 (198 years ago)
- Location: 46.81109°N 71.20513°W; Governors' Garden, Quebec City, Canada
- Designed by: Captain John Crawford Young
- Commemorated: James Wolfe; Louis-Joseph de Montcalm
- Their courage gave them a common death, history a common fame, posterity a common memorial

The Wolfe–Montcalm Monument is in Governors' Garden beyond the southern side of the Château Frontenac, Quebec. Completed in 1828, the obelisk is the oldest monument in Quebec City and the second-oldest war monument in Canada, the oldest being Nelson's Column in Montreal, which was completed in 1809. The monument commemorates the gallantry of two generals, James Wolfe from Great Britain and Louis-Joseph de Montcalm of France, who led armies which fought against each other in the Battle of the Plains of Abraham outside of Quebec City, and who both died during the battle. It is one of very few monuments to honor both the victorious and the defeated general of the same battle.

The architect who designed the monument was Captain John Crawford Young (1788–c. 1859), and the mason who built it was John Phillips of the 79th (Cameron) Highlanders.

The monument was unveiled in 1828 by Governor Dalhousie. The translation of the Latin on the monument, written by John Charlton Fisher reads "Their courage gave them a common death, history a common fame, posterity a common memorial."

The monument was whitewashed sometime after 1987.

== John Crawford Young ==
The monument's architect, John Crawford Young, was a captain in the 91st (Argyllshire Highlanders) Regiment of Foot in 1817. By 1833, he was a major.

== Gallery ==
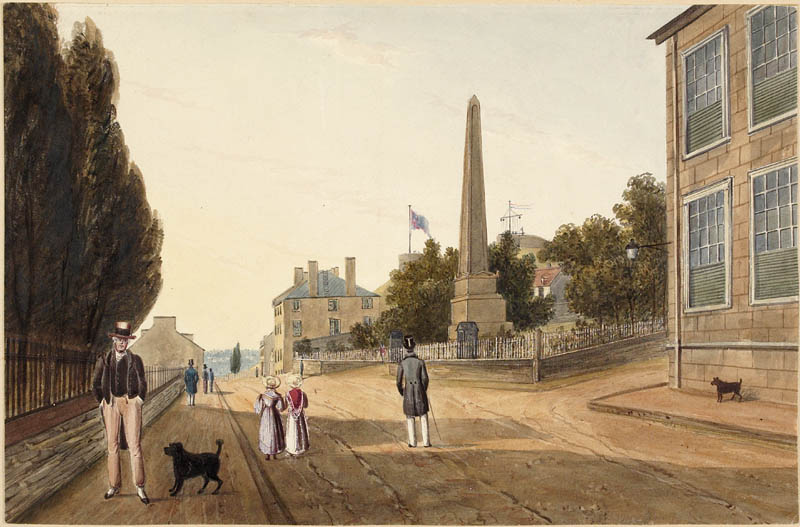
An 1828 view from Rue des Carrières

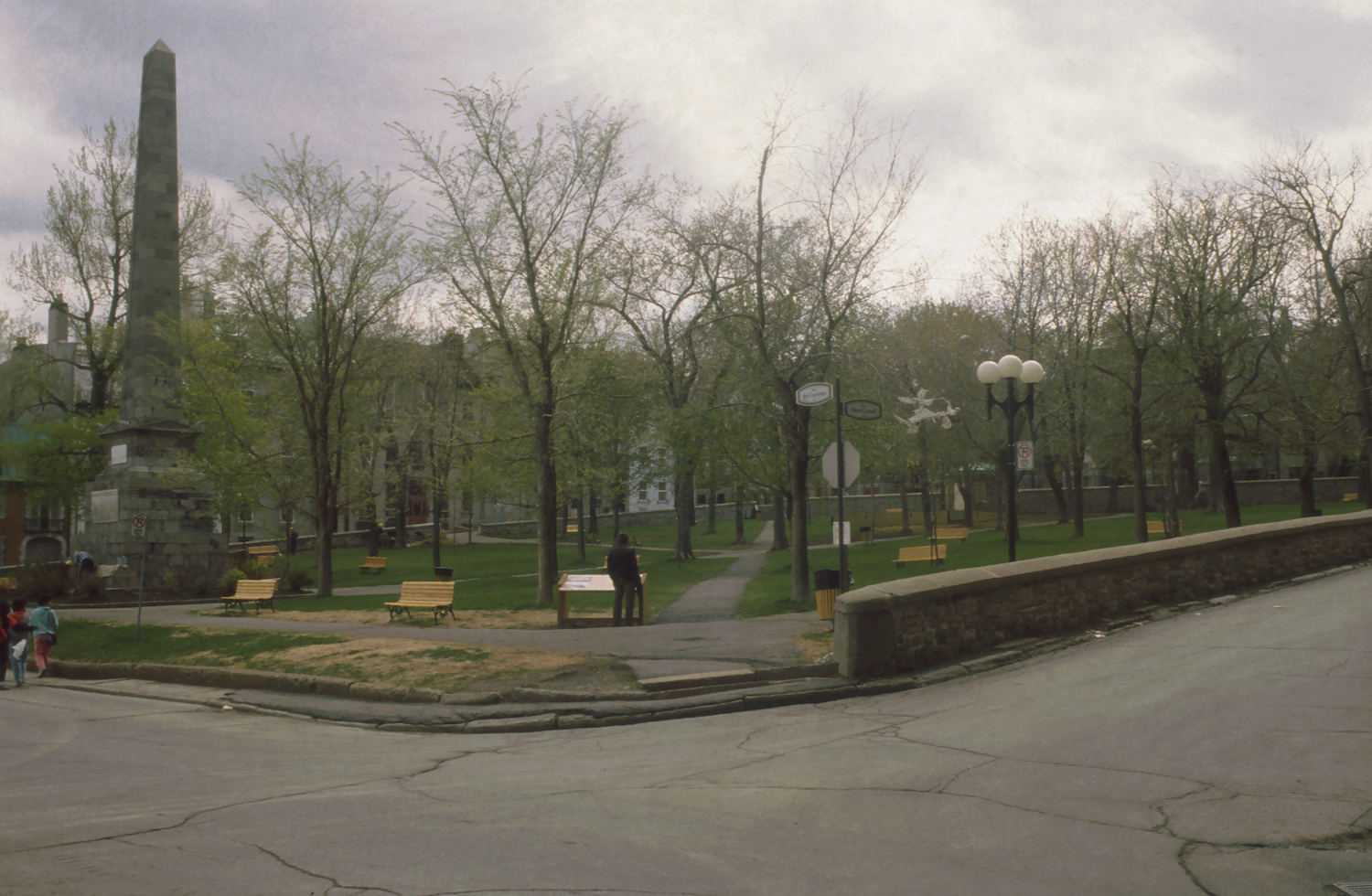
A view from the northeastern corner of the park in 1987, prior to the whitewashing of the monument
