= John Fischer =

John Fischer may refer to:

- John Fischer (baseball) (1855–1942), Major League pitcher and first baseman
- John Fischer (judge) (born 1948), Oklahoma Court of Civil Appeals
- John Fischer (painter) (1786–1875), German painter
- John Fischer (pianist) (1930–2016), American jazz pianist
- John Fischer (politician) (born 1947), Australian politician
- John Fischer, mayor of Anaheim, California, 1876–1877
- John Henry Fischer (1910–2009), academic administrator in Baltimore
- John Martin Fischer (born 1952), professor of philosophy at the University of California, Riverside
- Johnny Fischer (1912–1984), American golfer

== See also ==
- John Fisher (disambiguation)
- Johann Fischer (disambiguation)
