= 1 Avenue Sainte-Geneviève =

Building in Quebec City, Canada

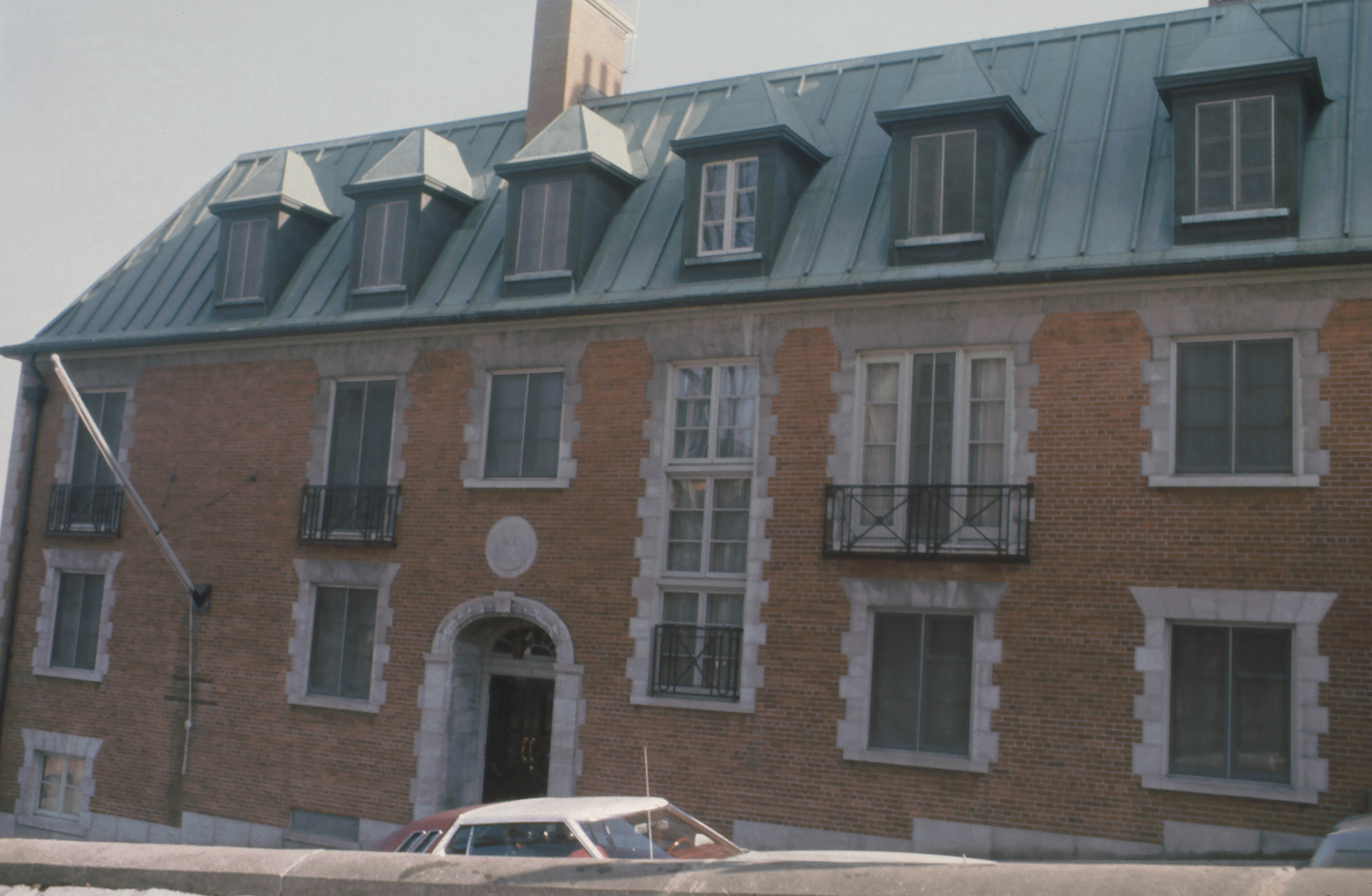
- The building in 1977
- Interactive map of the 1 Avenue Sainte-Geneviève area

General information
- Location: Quebec City, Quebec, Canada, 1 Avenue Sainte-Geneviève
- Coordinates: 46.8106°N 71.2048°W
- Completed: 1952 (74 years ago)

Technical details
- Floor count: 4

1 Avenue Sainte-Geneviève is a building in Quebec City, Quebec, Canada. Located on Avenue Sainte-Geneviève, overlooking the Governors' Garden from the south, it is the home of the United States Consulate General in Quebec City. The building also has an entrance at 2 Place Terrasse Dufferin on its eastern side.

The Governors' Garden stands on the former location of the gardens owned by Claude de Ramezay in the first half of the 18th century. He lived on nearby Notre-Dame Street.

According to the City of Québec heritage registry, the building at 1 Avenue Sainte‑Geneviève was designed by architect Gaston Amyot and constructed in the early 1950s, exhibiting influences of mid‑20th‑century modernist architectural styles while forming part of the historic urban fabric overlooking Governors’ Garden.

== Gallery ==
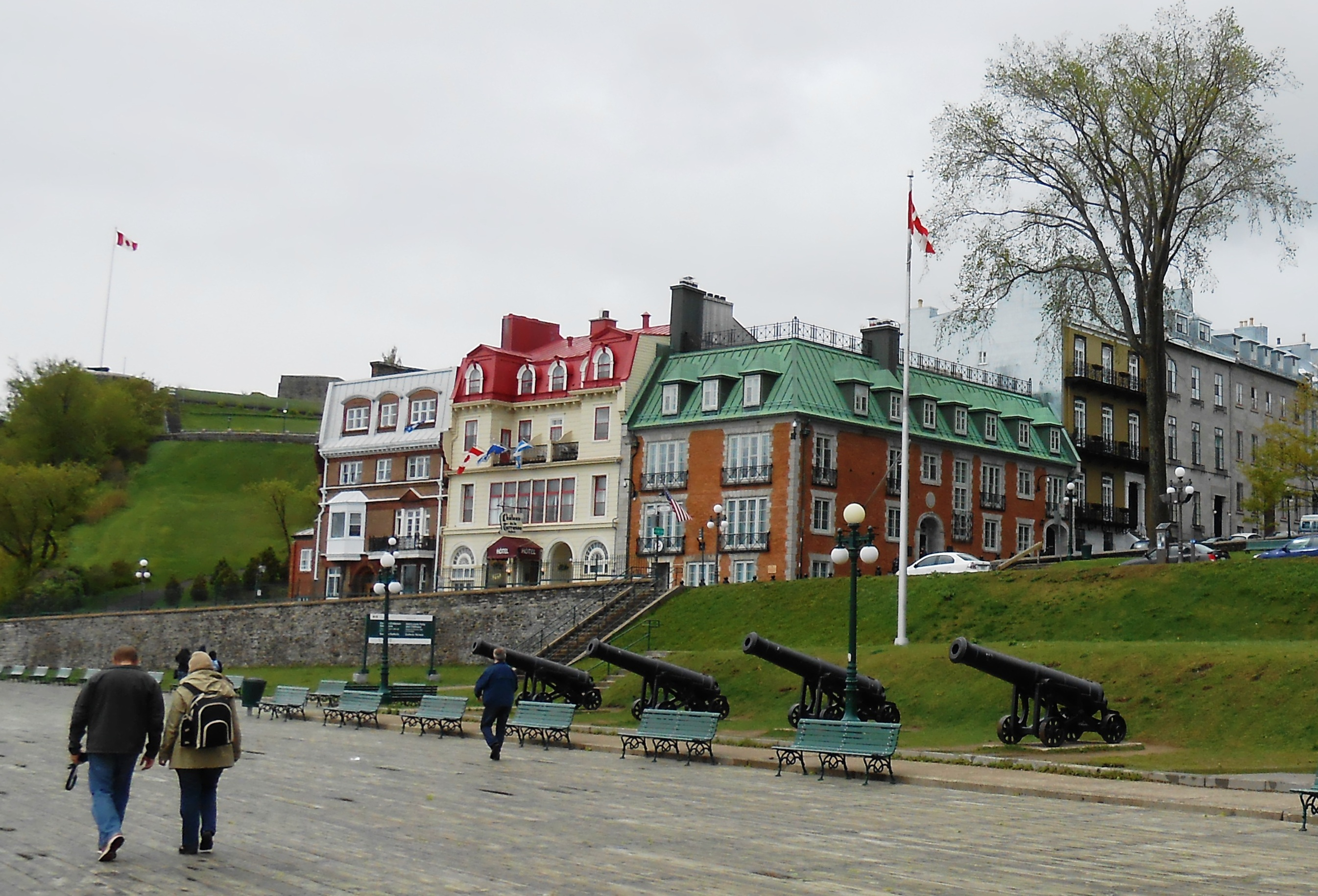
View from Terrasse Dufferin, looking west

== See also ==
- List of diplomatic missions of the United States
