= Ernst Homberger =

Swiss industrialist (1869–1955)

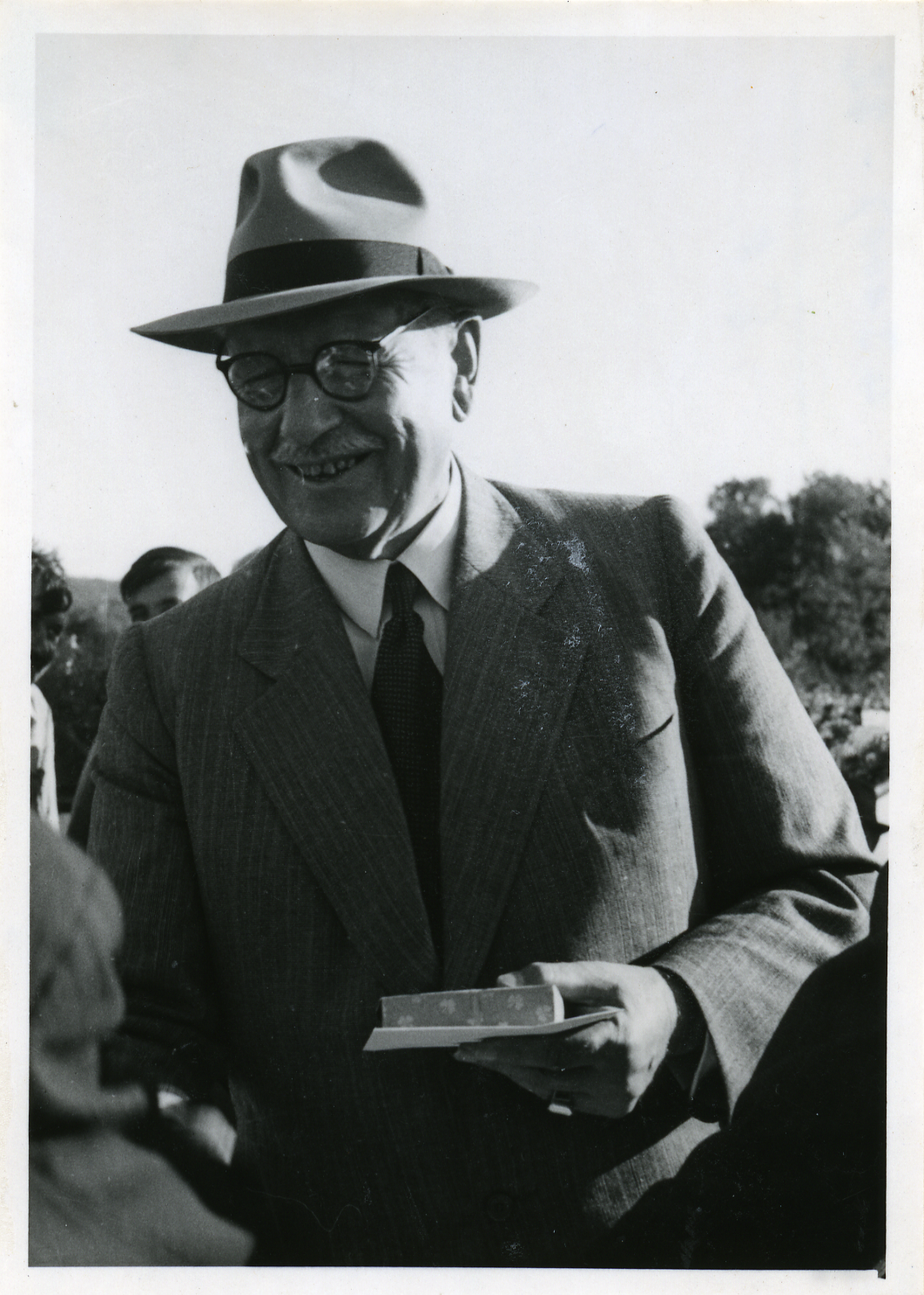
Ernst Homberger (1943)

Ernst Jakob Homberger (5 July 1869 – 13 January 1955) was a Swiss industrialist. He was the director of the industrial company Georg Fischer from 1902 and the director of the watch manufacturer IWC Schaffhausen from 1905.

== Family and early life ==
Homberger was born in 1869. He attended schools in St. Gallen and Zürich, and received a trade education at a school in Neuchâtel. He married Bertha Margaretha Rauschenbach in 1903, a daughter of Johannes Rauschenbach-Schenk. In the same year, his wife's sister Emma Rauschenbach married the psychiatrist and psychoanalyst Carl Jung. Homberger and his wife had three sons who became notable rowers: Hans Homberger (1908–1986), Rudolf Homberger (1910–?), and Alex Homberger (1912–2007).

== Professional career ==
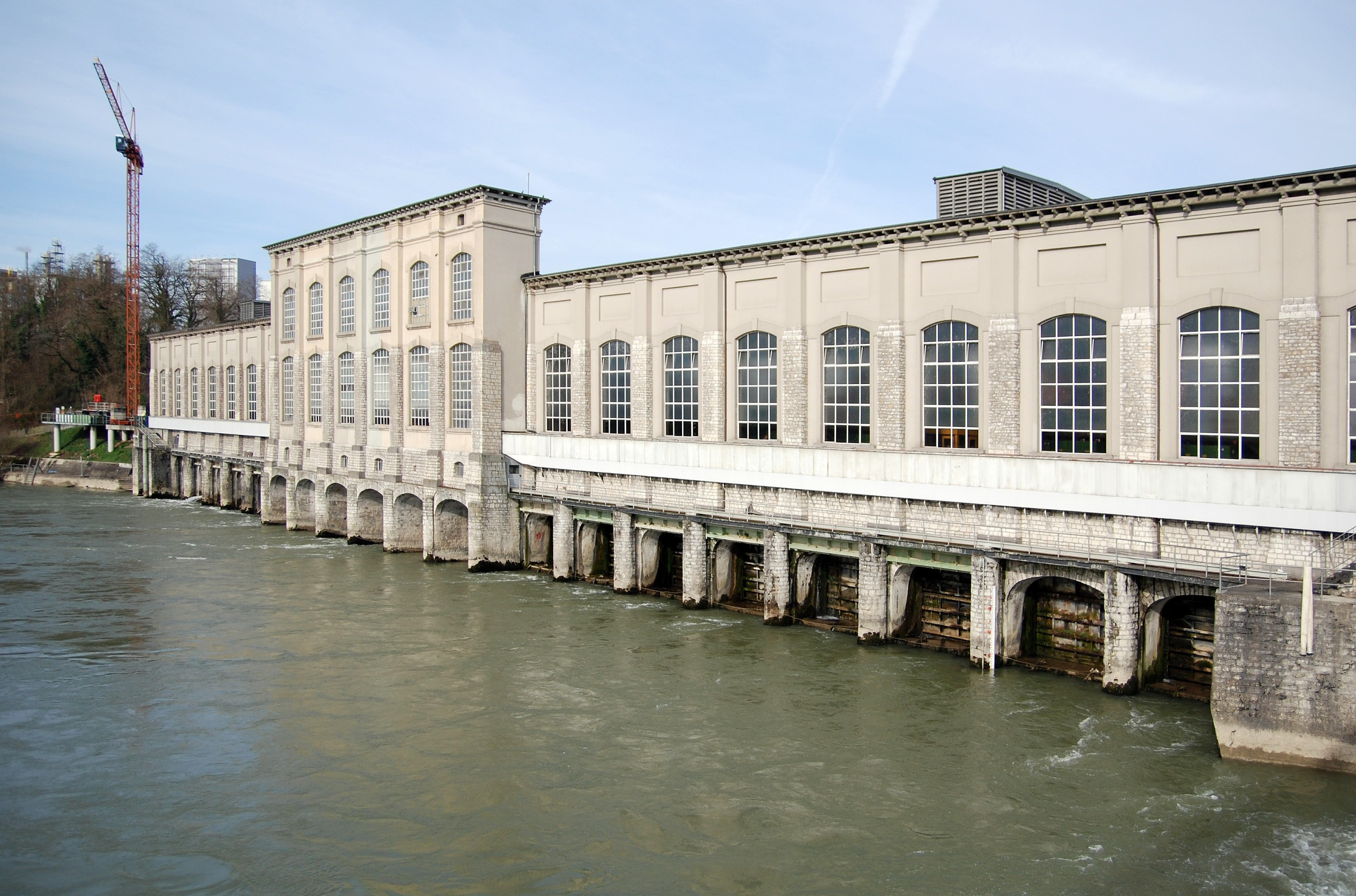
The hydroelectric plant in Rheinfelden (opened 1899)

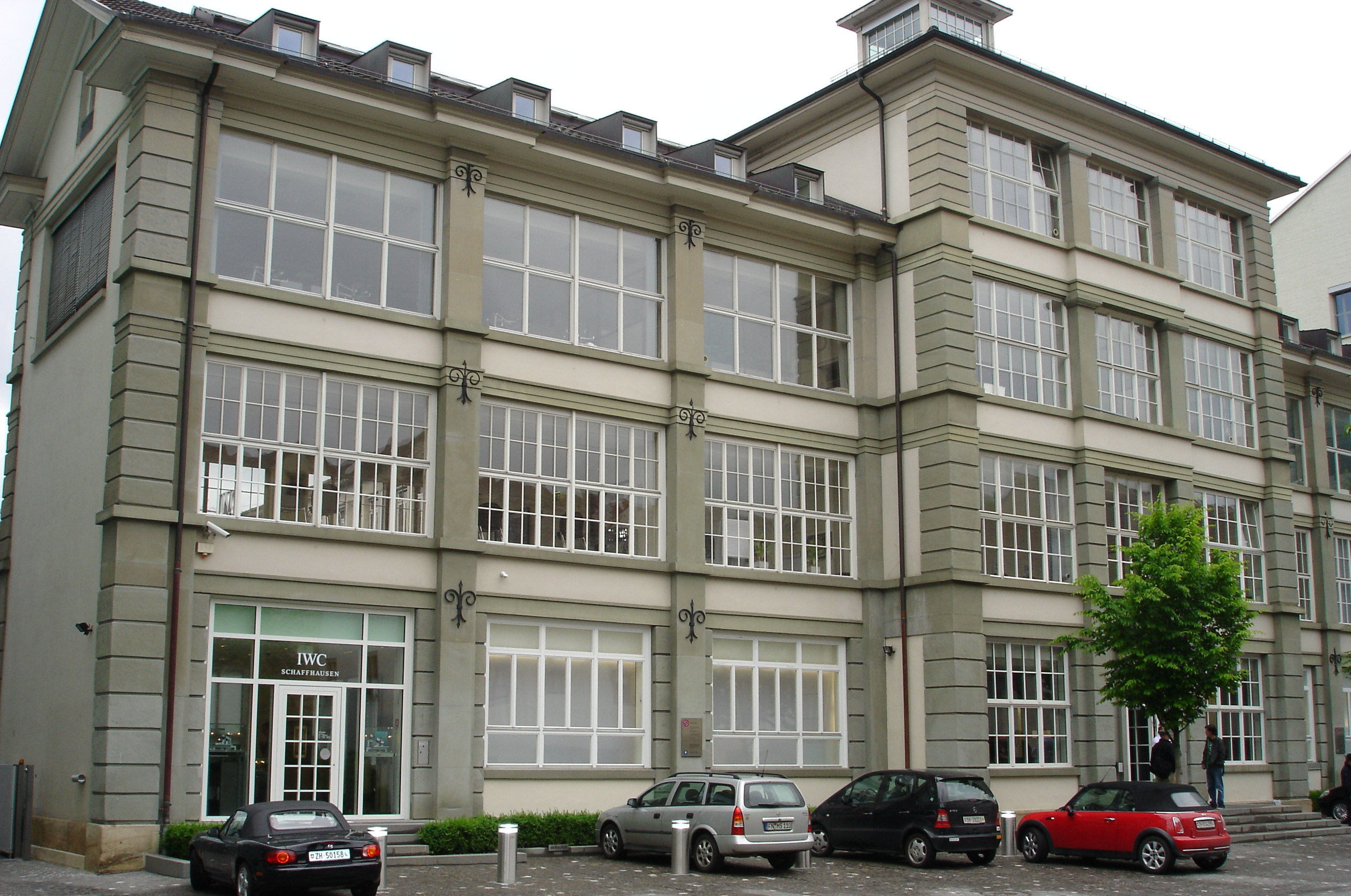
International Watch Company head office in Schaffhausen

After his education, Homberger started his working life in trading companies and banks in Zürich and London. He then worked for a bank in the West Indies. He returned to Switzerland in 1896 and worked for Kraftübertragungswerke Rheinfelden, a newly-formed company that had the concession for a hydroelectric generation plant in the Rhine. Homberger quickly rose to become the company's authorised representative and was head of accounting.

Homberger entered the management of the Georg Fischer company in Schaffhausen on behalf of a bank and soon purchased company shares for himself. Since 1902, Homberger was the company's commercial director. Through his 1903 marriage he became involved in the International Watch Company together with his brother-in-law Carl Jung. When Johannes Rauschenbach-Schenk died in 1905, both Jung and Homberger became shareholders alongside their wives, and Homberger became managing director. Homberger became sole owner in 1929 when he bought out Jung.

In 1952, the University of St. Gallen awarded an honorary economics doctorate (Dr. oec. h. c.) to Homberger. When Homberger died on 13 January 1955, his son Hans took over the company.
