= Georg Fischer (company) =

Manufacturing company in Switzerland

Georg Fischer AG
- Type: Public (Aktiengesellschaft)
- Traded as: SIX: GF; SMI MID component
- Industry: Manufacturing
- Founded: 1802
- Founder: Johann Conrad Fischer
- Headquarters: Schaffhausen, Switzerland
- Number of locations: 57 production facilities (2018)
- Key people: Andreas Müller (CEO), Mads Joergensen (CFO), Yves Serra (Chairman of the Board)
- Products: Liquids and gas transport, Industrial automation
- Revenue: ▲CHF 4.776 billion (2024)
- Operating income: ▲CHF 389 million (2024)
- Net income: ▼CHF 214 million (2024)
- Owner: Public
- Number of employees: 19 023 (2024)
- Website: https://www.georgfischer.com/en

Georg Fischer (abbreviated GF) comprises four divisions GF Piping Systems, GF Building Flow Solutions (since November 2023), GF Casting Solutions, and GF Machining Solutions. Founded in 1802, the corporation is headquartered in Schaffhausen and is present in 45 countries, with 187 companies, 76 of them production facilities. Its over 19 000 employees generated sales of over CHF 4 billion in 2024. GF offers pipes for the safe transport of liquids and gases, lightweight casting components in vehicles, and high-precision manufacturing technologies.

== Divisions ==
=== GF Piping Systems ===
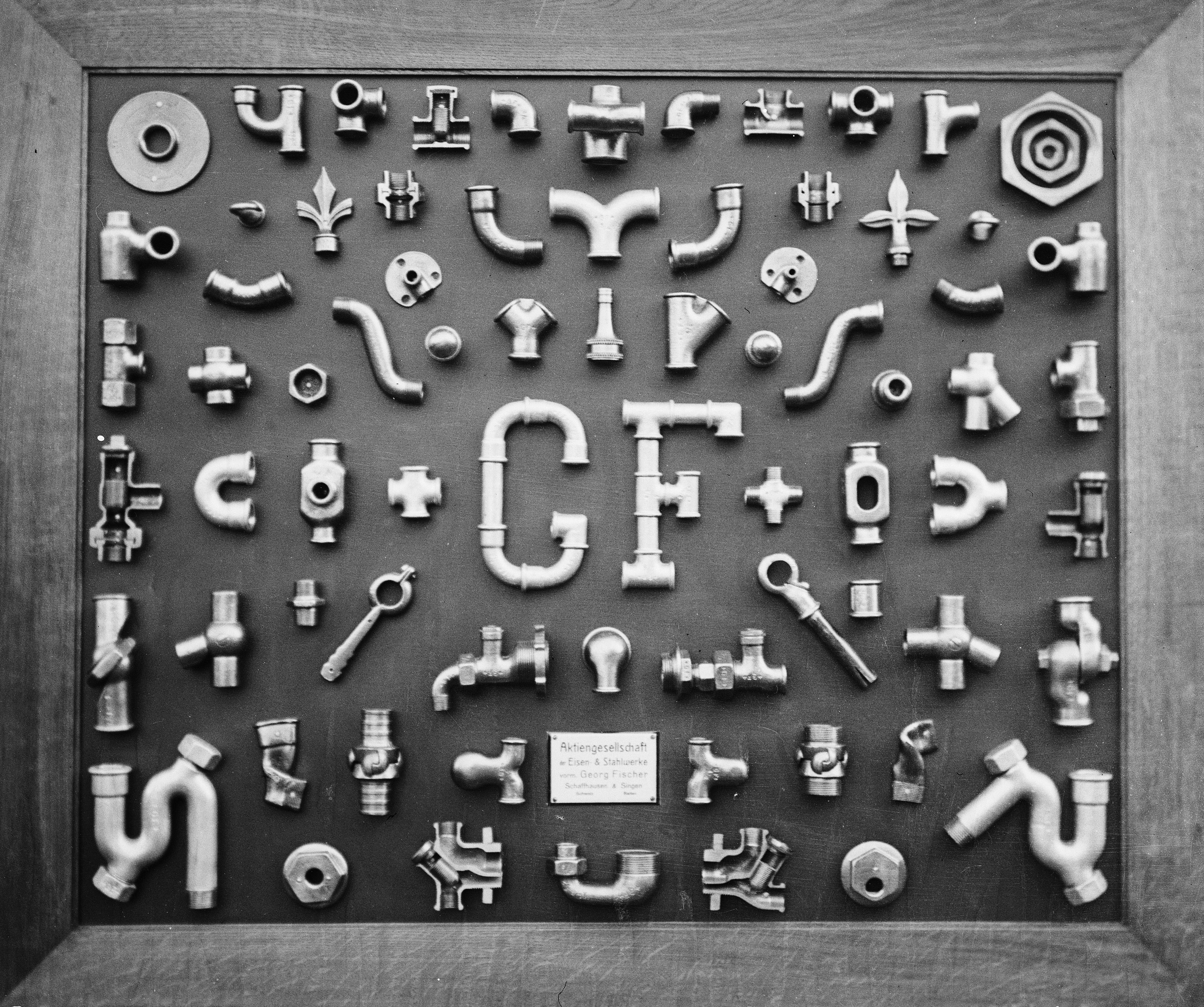
Piping Systems

GF Piping Systems supplies piping systems made of plastics and metal, as well as solid and hollow bar stock for machining. The division makes components for the transport of water and gas in industry, utilities, and buildings. Its product line includes fittings, valves, pipes, automation and jointing. GF Piping Systems has its own sales companies and representatives in over 100 countries. The division is present in Europe, Asia and the Americas, with more than 30 manufacturing sites and research and development centers.

=== GF Casting Solutions (formerly GF Automotive) ===
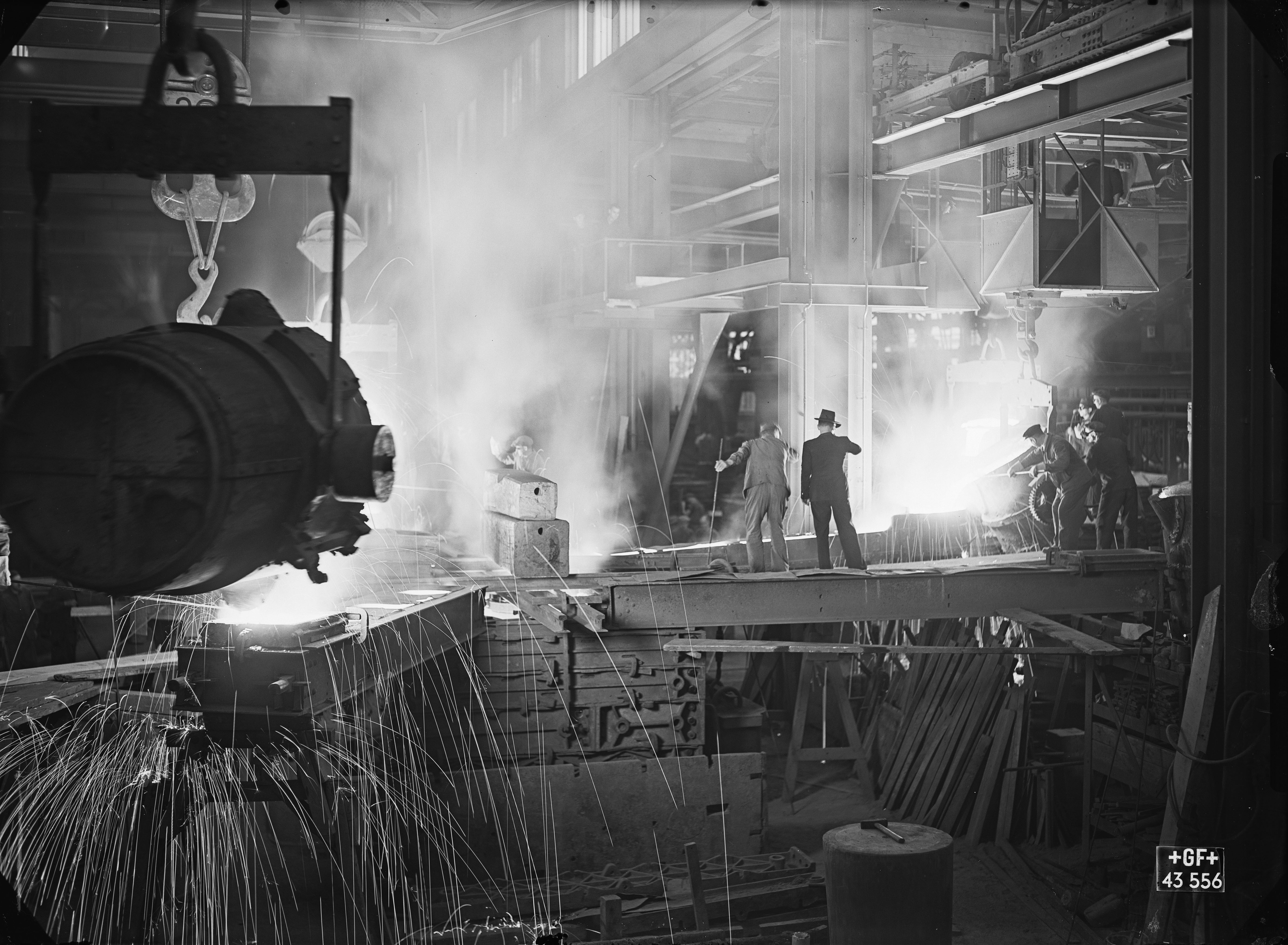
Casting, Georg Fischer Werk I, Mühlental 1943

GF Casting Solutions manufactures lightweight cast components from ductile iron, aluminum and magnesium for the automotive and other industries. GF Casting Solutions manufactures at 14 production sites in Germany, Austria, Romania, Switzerland, China and the USA. In those countries as well as in Switzerland, Korea and Japan it operates sales offices. The research and development centers are located in Schaffhausen (Switzerland) and Suzhou (China).

=== GF Machining Solutions ===
GF Machining Solutions' electrical discharge, high-speed milling, laser texturing machines, additive manufacturing machines as well as automation and clamping solutions make it a provider to the tool and mold making industry and to manufacturers of precision components. Most important customer segments are information and communication technology, aerospace, and the automotive industry. The division has its own sales companies in more than 50 countries and production plants in Switzerland, Sweden, and China. GF Machining Solutions operates research and development centers in Meyrin, Losone, and Biel (Switzerland), Vällingby (Sweden), Beijing, and Changzhou (China).

== History ==
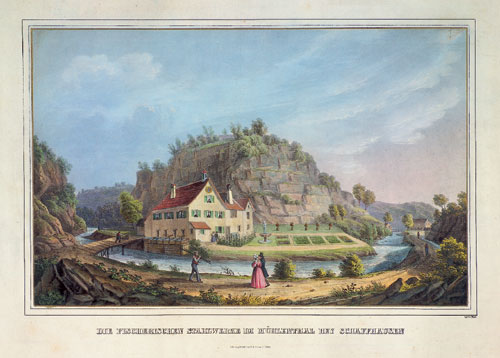
The Fischer steelworks in Mühlental near Schaffhausen, around 1850

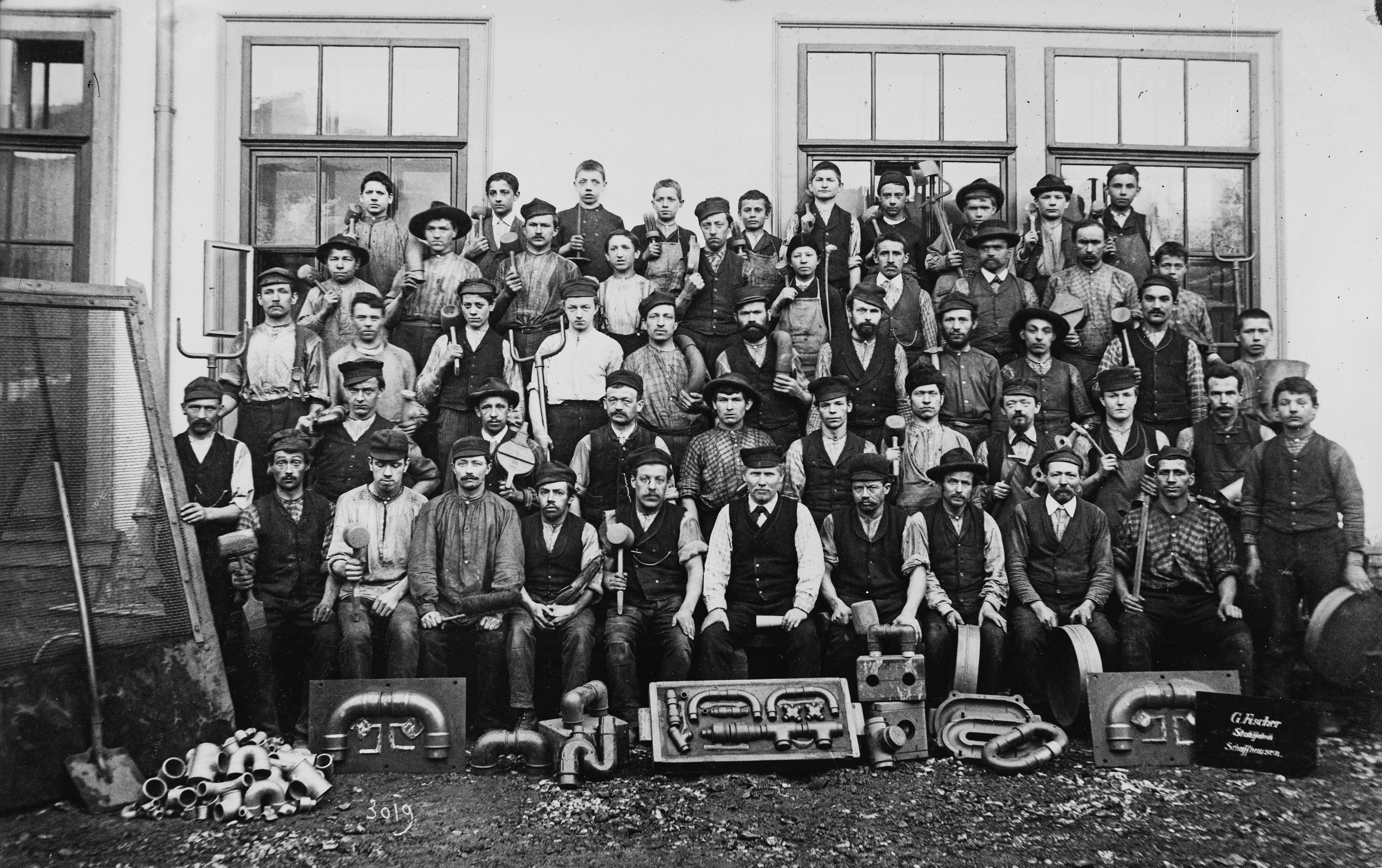
Workers of Georg Fischer 1895

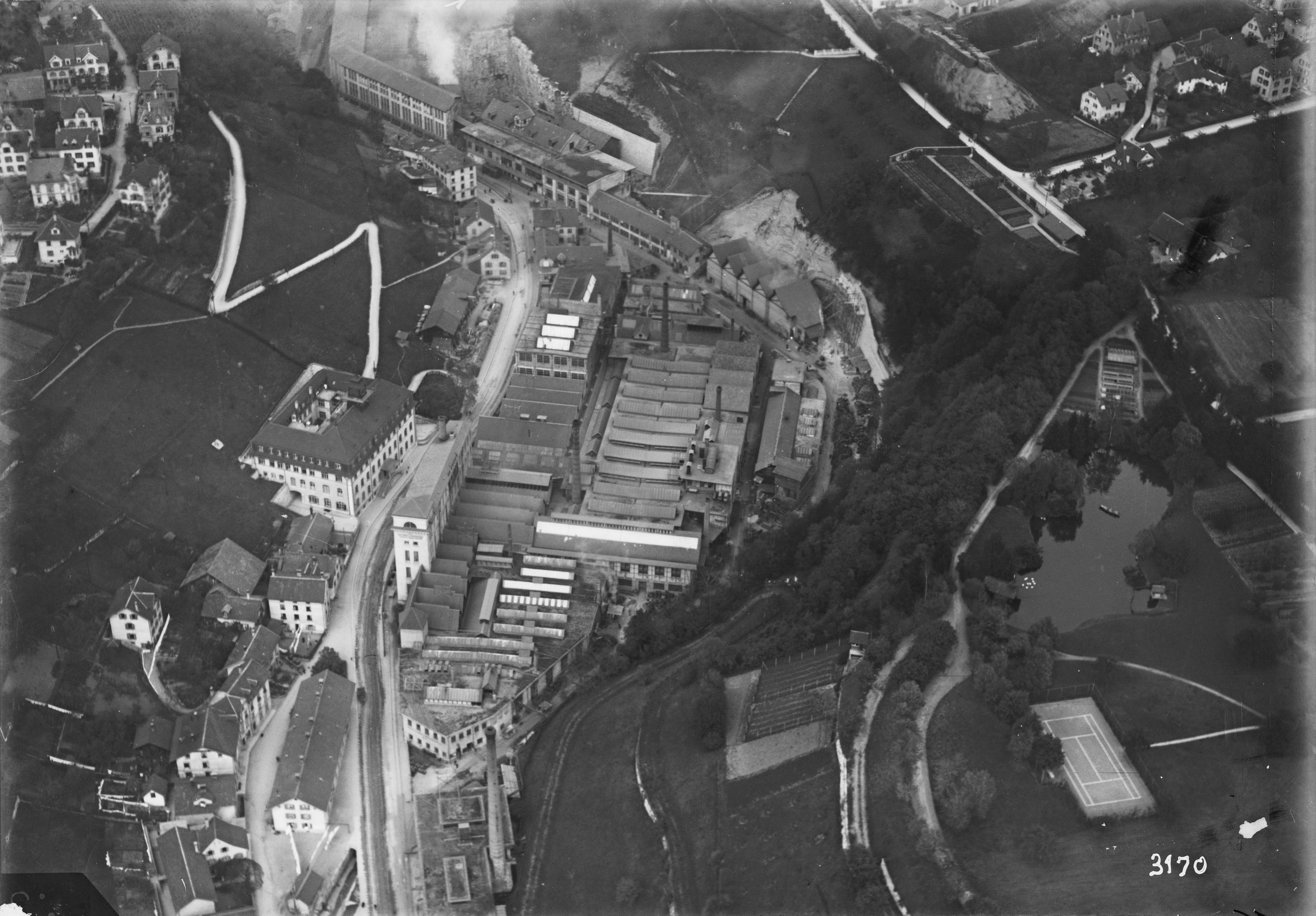
Georg Fischer Werk I, Mühlental, Schaffhausen, 1920

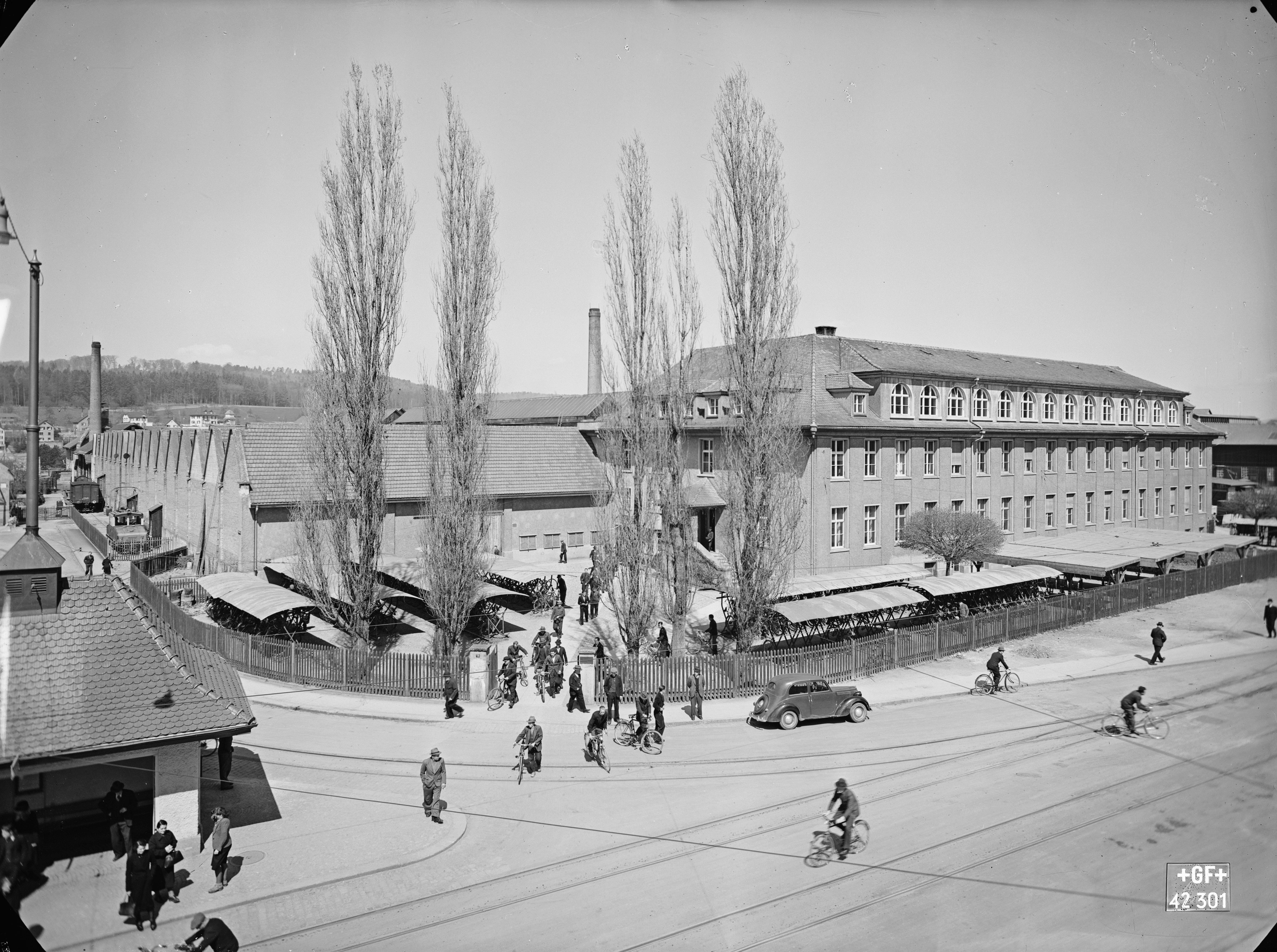
Georg Fischer in Ebnat, Schaffhausen, 1942

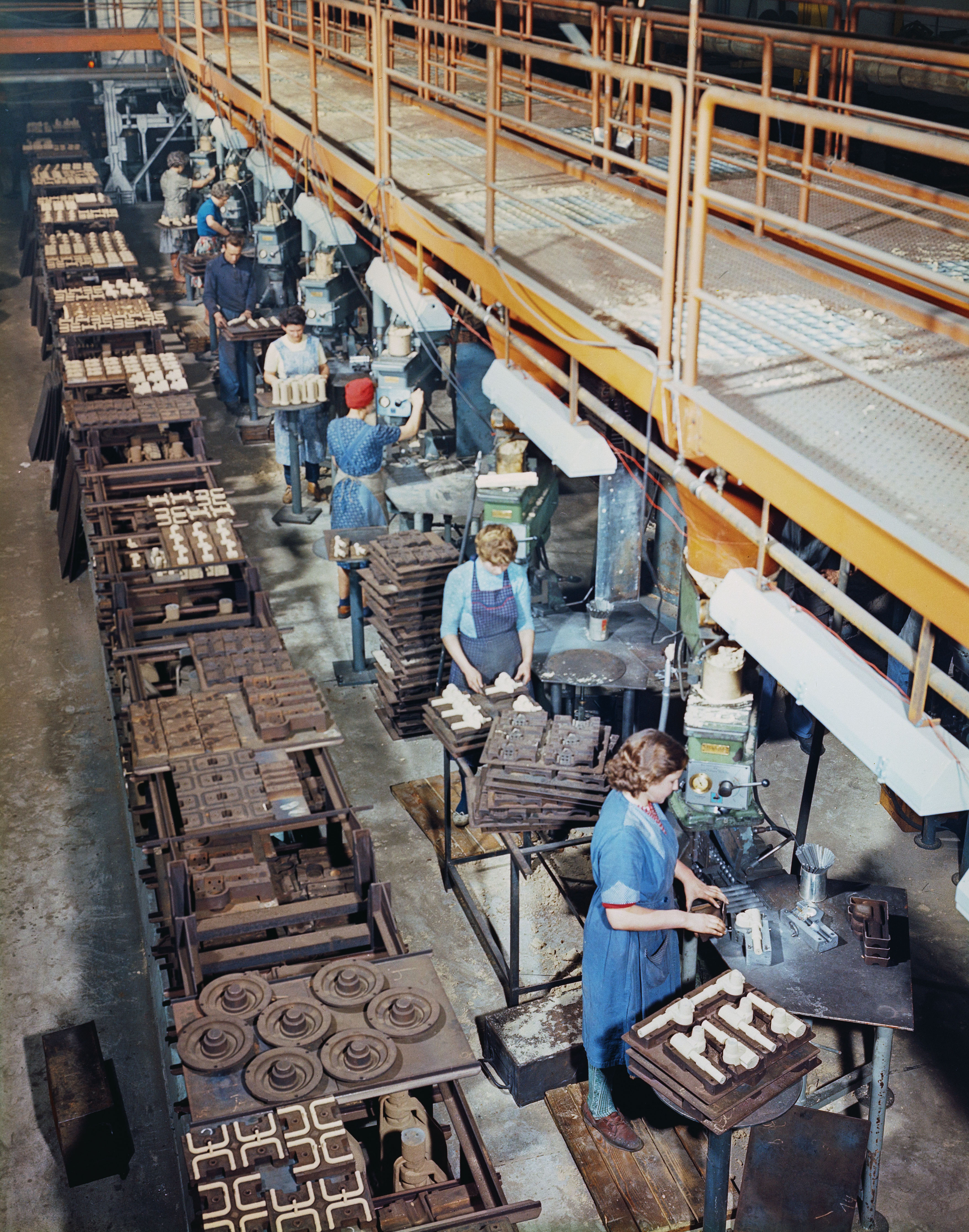
Werk Mettmann, 1960

Johann Conrad Fischer (1773–1854) laid the cornerstones for today's company in 1802 with the acquisition of a mill in Schaffhausen, which he transformed into a foundry. 1827 and 1833 followed with the acquisition of two steelworks in Austria, opened by Johann Conrad and son Georg (1804–1888). After Johann Conrad's death in 1854, his son Georg inherited the enterprise; and his grandson, Georg II (1834–1887) took over the management of the Schaffhauser enterprise in 1856, which had been closed after the death of his grandfather.

In 1861, the company received the name "Georg Fischer Schaffhausen" from Georg II. In 1864, he acquired the company from its father, and began the production of fittings made of malleable cast iron and introduced the first trademark product: a stylized fish with the letters GF.

A health insurance for the staff was established in 1867, and one year later the construction and purchase of workers' houses began in Mühlental, which is dominated by Georg Fischer. From 1876, an accident insurance was put into place at Georg Fischer, and in 1880, one of the first company restaurants in Switzerland was set up in Mühlental. The death of Georg II, in 1887, forced his son Georg III (1864–1955) to give up on his studies to take over the management of the company.

Under Georg III, the company overcame the crisis triggered by the Vienna stock market crash; over a period of nine years, the workforce was tripled to 550 employees. In 1895, the factory in the German neighboring town of Singen on the Hohentwiel was opened as a branch enterprise of the Schaffhaus Main Works, in order to avoid the high German custom fees. In order to meet the increasing capital requirements, Georg III converted the individual company into the «Aktiengesellschaft der Eisen- und Stahlwerke von Georg Fischer» in 1896, which was initially led by the Fischer family. By the turn of the century, the company had a workforce of 1600 employees.

Overcapacity in the market led to a crisis in 1901. On the Board of Directors there were tensions between Georg III and the bank's representative, Ernst Homberger (1869–1955). Because of the pressure from the bank, Georg III was finally forced out of the company in 1902, and Homberger took over as head of the company for the next 50 years.

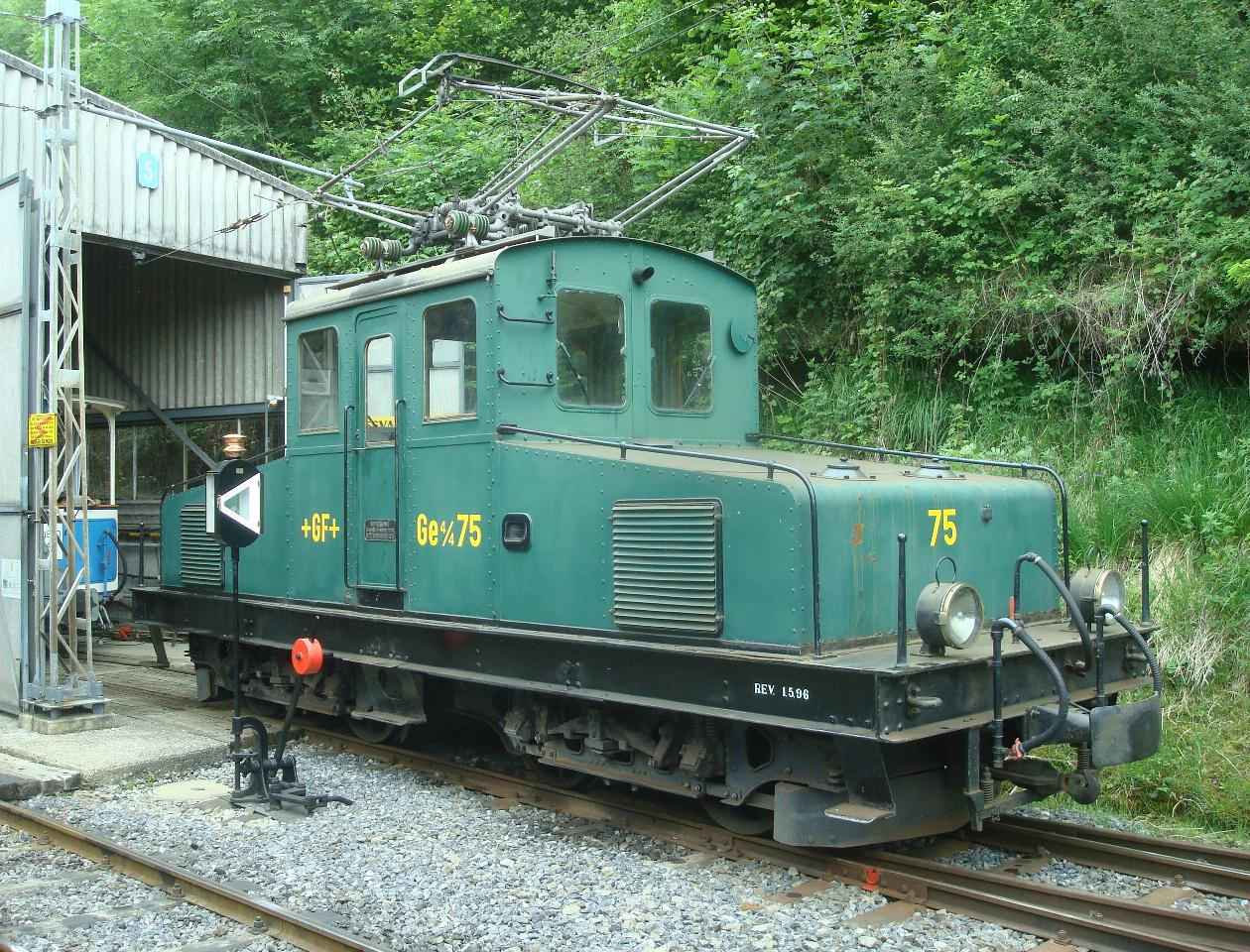
Locomotive Ge 4/4 75 of the former company-owned factory railway, which traded on the stretch network of the streetcar Schaffhausen, with visible + GF + trademark

The first external sign of the change was the introduction of the new brand mark in 1903, the current GF logo with the two symbolized cross-fittings.

The company acquired the estate of the former monastery Paradies in Schlatt in 1918. In 1919, GF took part in the founding of iron mine Gonzen AG; the mine was shut down again in 1966 and has since been preserved as an industrial monument. Mechanical engineering began in 1926, first with textile machines, and in 1938 with the production of lathes followed.

The Homberger Foundation was founded in 1927 with the aim of supporting the children of the GF employees in vocational training. Under Homberger, Britannia Iron and Steel Works Ltd. was founded in 1933 in Bedford and transferred to a GF subsidiary.

In 1947 the company received the name "Georg Fischer Aktiengesellschaft". The "Stiftung Eisenbibliothek" was founded in 1948, and the library itself was opened in 1952 in the partially restored monastery Paradies.

For the first time, in 1957, plastic fittings were manufactured at the Singen plant, and the processing of plastics became a central business area. In 1964, for the first time, more than half of sales were generated abroad. Georg Fischer Plastics Ltd. in the English Huntingdon was opened in 1966 as a factory for plastic fittings. In 1968 the production of enameled cooking utensils and pouring pans was discontinued.

In 1970, the company first surpassed the mark of 1 billion Swiss francs in sales; the following years were marked by expansion. The Swiss factory Seewis, for plastic fittings, was opened in 1971. In 1972 the company Waeschle was bought in the German town of Ravensburg, and in 1974 the fully renovated monastery Paradies opened its own training center.

Numerous restructurings were carried out in the 1980s. Weaving machines (Maschinenfabrik Rüti) were sold to Sulzer in 1982. Between 1987 and 1991, the activities of the Schaffhausen and Singen locations were reduced. Singen became the future location of the steel foundry, while in Schaffhausen the business concentrated on plastic pipes. Through this, the end of the traditional steel cast in Schaffhauser Mühlental was on 1 November 1991.

The lathes production was sold in 1989, and in 1990, the company was transformed into a holding company. The four divisions of vehicle technology, pipeline systems, manufacturing technology and plant engineering were implemented. All other activities which did not fit into the new structure were sold or became independent.

Already in 1983, 51% of Ateliers des Charmilles in Geneva were acquired and renamed Charmilles Technologies SA. The company was taken over completely by GF in 1988 and made part of the Division of Manufacturing Engineering. The Electro erosions department was enlarged in 1996, through the take over of the majority shares in Agie SA in Losone, Switzerland, and brought them together under a common roof at the newly founded Agie Charmilles Holding AG in Zug.

In 2000, the Plant Engineering division became independent as Coperion Holding GmbH, headquartered in Konstanz. In 2004, a new corporate design was introduced, where the divisions received their current names: automotive technology became GF Automotive, piping systems became GF Piping Systems, and the manufacturing technology became GF Machine Tools

The remaining shares in Coperion were sold in 2006 and a restructuring of the Swiss sites of the GF Machine Tools division was announced. The production of the electro-erosion machines was concentrated in Losone and Meyrin and a part of the production was sold to the Winterthur machine factory Rieter. At the beginning of 2007, Agie Charmilles Holding AG was merged into the GF Group, where the GF Machine Tools division became the GF AgieCharmilles division. On 1 January 2014, GF AgieCharmilles was renamed GF Machining Solutions. The new name underlines the profile of Georg Fischer as a single company with three divisions.

On 1 July 2014, GF Machining Solutions acquired Liechti Engineering AG and thereby strengthened its competence in the aviation industry.

=== Former Subsidiaries ===
==== GF Pipe Coupling Technology ====
Founded in Schaffhausen, Switzerland in 1960, the GF Pipe Coupling Technology division focused on the production of pipe and tube cutting, facing, and beveling machines for high purity process piping. The sales and management of the division were moved to Singen, Germany in 1993. In 2006 Georg Fischer sold the GF Pipe Coupling Technology division to Illinois Tool Works Inc. (ITW), where the company was renamed from Rohrverbindungstechnik GmbH to Orbitalum Tools GmbH.
