= Jonathan Fisher (barrister) =

Jonathan Fisher KC is a London barrister specialising in corporate and financial crime, proceeds of crime, and tax cases He is also a Senior Fellow, and a visiting professor in practice, at the London School of Economics.

== Independent review into disclosure and fraud ==
In 2023, it was announced Fisher would be leading an independent review into disclosure and fraud, to make it quicker and easier to bring criminals to justice.

Part 1 of the Review, entitled “Disclosure in a Digital Age”, was published by the Home Office on 20 March 2025. Part 2 of the Review, entitled “Fraud in the Digital Age”, was published by the Home Office on 14 July 2026.

In Part 1, Fisher made 45 recommendations which mirror the disclosure regime’s impact on the full breadth of the criminal justice system. His key overarching recommendations for reform are (1) to modernise existing legislation and reduce administrative burdens by utilising advanced technology, (2) to improve criminal court processes with consideration for an entirely new intensive disclosure regime court pathway, designed for the most complex criminal cases, (3) to enhance disclosure quality by designing a new national learning standard across all law enforcement agencies. The Government thanked Fisher for his work in providing such a comprehensive review.

In Part 2, Fisher made 47 recommendations aimed at tackling the issue of fraud, including: doubling the maximum sentence for fraud from 10 to 20 years; increasing social media companies’ obligations to tackle fraud; improving protections and incentives for whistleblowers; introducing new criminal offences to tackle the emerging ways of committing fraud; piloting a restorative justice programme for fraud cases; fostering international cooperation with trade agreements and Memorandum of Understandings; and embedding fraud prevention and ethical awareness in the national curriculum.

On 14 July 2026, in addition to publishing Part 2 of the Review, the Government also published its response to Part 1, announcing that it will move ahead with the majority of Jonathan’s recommendations surrounding disclosure.

The response to Part 2 is pending. In its Economic Crime Strategy 2026 – 2029 published on 9 March 2026 by the Home Office, the Government indicated (at paragraph 120, page 50) that it will carefully consider Fisher’s findings and recommendations, “which will help shape a more adaptive, agile and future-focused response to the changing methods and scale of fraud”.

Ranked by the independent legal directories in Band / Tier 1 for Business and Regulatory Crime, Financial Crime, Financial Crime (Corporates), Proceeds of Crime and Asset Forfeiture cases, Jonathan is featured for his work in Tax (Corporate), Financial Services Regulation, Fraud (Crime) and Fraud (Civil).

Fisher was awarded the Degree of Doctor of Philosophy in 2021 by The LSE for his thesis entitled “Mandatory self-reporting of criminal conduct by a company: corporate rights and engaging the privilege against self-incrimination”. Fisher was also awarded the Honorary Degree of Doctor of Laws by UWE Bristol in 2015, in recognition of his outstanding legal expertise and academic contribution to the areas of financial and corporate law.

In May 2011, Fisher was appointed a Commissioner on the Bill of Rights Commission established by the Coalition Government to investigate the case for a UK Bill of Rights.

Fisher was the Vice Chair of the Executive Committee of the Society of Conservative Lawyers between 2022-2025.

In July 2025, Jonathan was elected a Master of the Bench by Gray’s Inn during the Trinity term election.

== Selected cases and consultancy work ==
Fisher has appeared as counsel in a number of cases concerning financial crime, money laundering, and regulatory law.

In R (World Uyghur Congress) v National Crime Agency, Fisher represented the appellant in proceedings concerning the application of the Proceeds of Crime Act 2002 to cotton products originating from the Xinjiang Uyghur Autonomous Region of China and the scope of the National Crime Agency's investigative powers under the Act.

In NCA v A and Others, Fisher acted as counsel in proceedings for civil recovery of rare and high-value assets. Assets recovered included dinosaur bones worth £12.4 million, high-value London properties and Chinese artworks.

In Ashbolt & Arundell v HM Revenue & Customs, Fisher appeared for the claimants in a judicial review challenging the lawfulness of search warrants obtained by HM Revenue & Customs in the course of a tax avoidance investigation.

Fisher led dialogue sessions for the African Union's New Partnership for Africa's Development (NEPAD) in Nairobi, Kenya, on fiscal leakage and illicit financial flows in the extractive industries. The regional dialogue brought together senior government officials from African ministries responsible for natural resources and finance to discuss tax avoidance, corruption, and fiscal policy in the extractive sector.

Fisher provided legal advice to the Gibraltar Government in relation to the Principal Auditor’s report, which was discussed in Parliament in September 2025.
