= John Charlton Fisher =

Canadian journalist (1794–1849)

John Charlton Fisher, Esq., L.L.D. (October 23, 1794 – August 10, 1849) was a Canadian writer, journalist, and publisher.

Born in England, he settled in Lower Canada (present-day Quebec). He wrote the verse on the Wolfe-Montcalm Monument.
