= Johann Conrad Fischer =

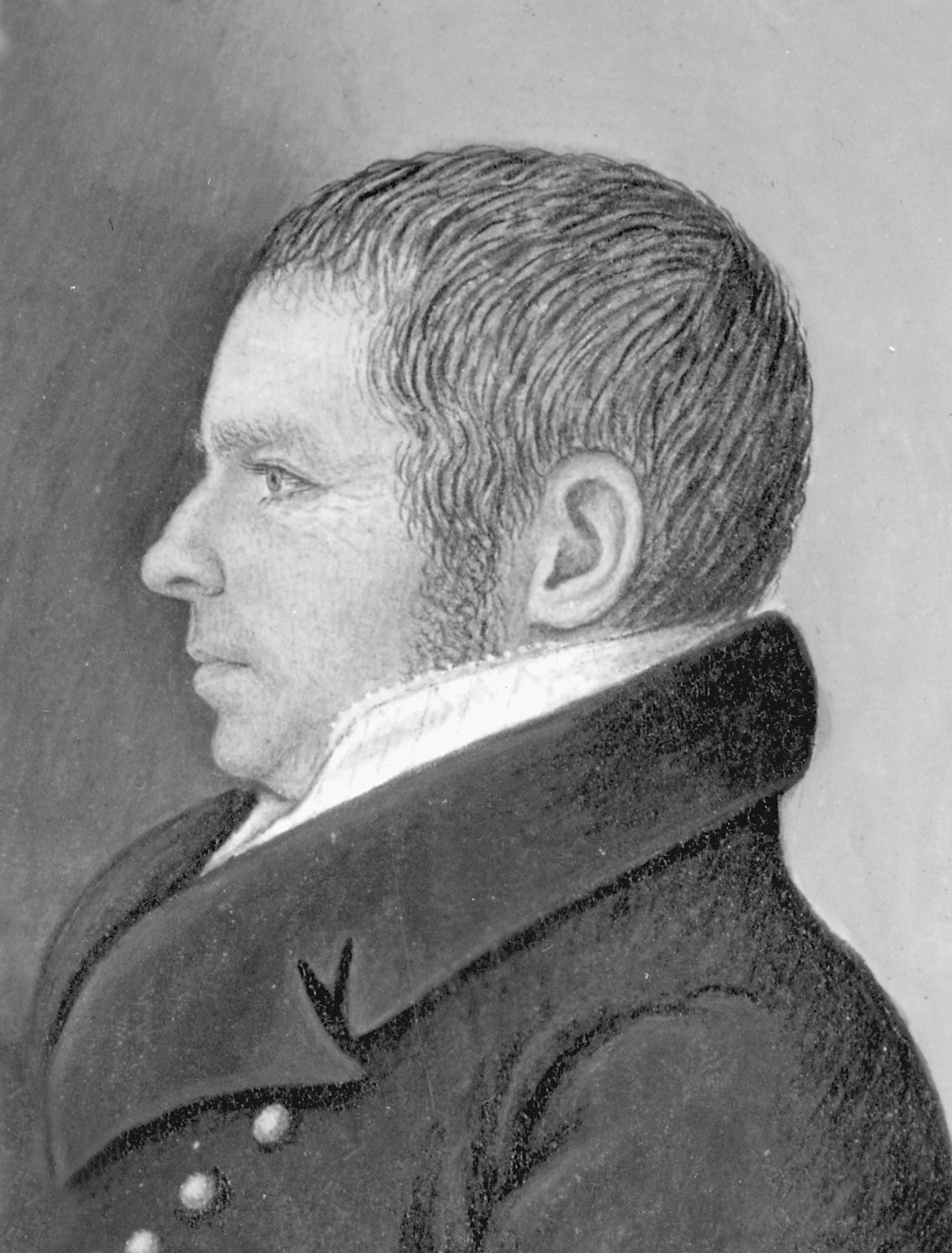
Johann Conrad Fischer 1854

Johann Conrad Fischer II (14 September 1773 – 26 December 1854) was a Swiss metallurgist, inventor, and pioneer in the steel industry. As an entrepreneur he also held public offices. He was the first president of the City Council of Schaffhausen. He was the founder of Georg Fischer AG.

== Biography ==
Johann Conrad Fischer was born on 14 September 1773 as son of the coppersmith and entrepreneur Johann Conrad Fischer I in Schaffhausen. After attending the Gymnasium in Schaffhausen, he learned the trades of coppersmith and fire pump maker in his father's company. Between 1792 and 1794 he travelled through Germany, Scandinavia and England. After his return to Switzerland in 1794 he took over the management of the family business in 1797. In 1802 he purchased several former mills in the Muehlental (SH) section of the Merishausertal on the northern outskirts of Schaffhausen and set up a small foundry for the production of cast iron bells and fire pump engines. In 1806, as the first on continental Europe, he began to cast steel. Once the Continental Blockade was lifted in 1814, Fischer undertook a study trip to England and subsequently published his experiences in a travel journal. In particular he was critical of the economic upheavals he observed in the Midlands, the beginnings of the Industrial Revolution. He continued to travel through England, Austria, Germany and France. In France he was invited by the Ministry of the Interior to set up a business there. He began to experiment with the addition of alloys to cast steel. In 1807 he cast steel with manganese, in 1814 he mixed so-called yellow steel with copper, in 1819 with silver, and in 1823 with chromium. In 1827 he successfully created a cast iron which could be employed as malleable iron and obtained a patent in Austria for this invention. His last alloyed cast iron consisted to one-third part of copper, which he named Fischer-Metall. Due to its resistance to significant changes in form with changes in temperature, this alloy would become useful much later for railroad axials and points.

== Family ==
In 1797, Johann Conrad Fischer married Anna Catharina von Waldkirch. They had two daughters and five sons, three of whom carried on their father's engineering work:

- Sabina Catharina Fischer (1797–?)
- Johann Conrad Fischer III (1799–1830)
- Eduard Fischer (1801–1859)
- Wilhelm Fischer (1803–1882)
- Georg Fischer (1804–1888)
- Maria Fischer (1805–1870)
- Berthold Fischer (1807–1879)

Johann Conrad Fischer II died in Schaffhausen at the age of 81.

His grandson Georg Fischer II (1834–1887) and great-grandson George Fischer III (1864–1925) continued to expand the family business until the beginning of the 20th century.

== Fischer as Entrepreneur and Civic Leader ==
Fischer was more active as an inventor than as manufacturer and businessman. In 1819 he supported the establishment of a steel factory near Montbéliard in eastern France. He held license agreements with manufacturing companies in London and Luettich. Due to its favorable legal conditions, he patented nearly all his inventions in Austria. Furthermore he set up three steel foundries in Austria which were managed by his sons: 1827 in Hainfeld, 1833 in Traisen and 1839 in Salzburg.

Johann Conrad Fischer held several public offices in Schaffhausen beginning in 1797. His opinion was often sought by newspapers and journalists in matters related to railroads, coinage, import and export taxation, as well as constitutional matters. He maintained regular correspondence with many friends not only in Switzerland, but also in numerous other European countries. Fischer is regarded as one of the leading public figures of Schaffhausen in the 19th century, and one of the initiators of the Industrial Revolution as it became manifested in Switzerland.
