= John Fisher (footballer, born 1941) =

Australian rules footballer

Personal information
- Full name: John Fisher
- Born: 16 September 1941 (age 85)
- Original team: Kew Amateurs
- Height: 179 cm (5 ft 10 in)
- Weight: 77 kg (170 lb)

Playing career^{1}
Years	Club	Games (Goals)
1968–70	Hawthorn	26 (5)
- ^{1} Playing statistics correct to the end of 1970.

John Fisher (born 16 September 1941) is a former Australian rules footballer who played with Hawthorn in the Victorian Football League (VFL).
