= John Fisher (footballer and cricketer) =

English cricketer and footballer

Jackie Fisher
Personal information
- Full name: John Fisher
- Date of birth: 4 August 1897
- Place of birth: Hodthorpe, Whitwell, England
- Date of death: 1954 (aged 56–57)
- Height: 5 ft 9 in (1.75 m)
- Position: Winger

Senior career*
Years	Team	Apps	(Gls)
1921–1922	Chesterfield	19	(5)
1922–1923	Burnley	32	(3)
1923–1927	Chesterfield	153	(26)
1927–1928	Mansfield Town	?	(?)
1928–1930	Lincoln City	19	(3)
- * Club domestic league appearances and goals

John Fisher or Jackie Fisher (4 August 1897 – 22 June 1954) was an English sportsman who played association football professionally as a winger from 1921 to 1930, and cricket for Derbyshire in 1921 and 1922.

Fisher was born in Hodthorpe, Derbyshire. He made his debut for Derbyshire in 1921 in a match against Essex when he made his top score of 39 after being moved up the batting order for the second innings. He appeared in another match that season and once in 1922. He was a left-hand batsman who played 6 innings in 3 first-class matches with an average of 10.4. As a right-arm medium-pace bowler he bowled 30 balls but made no impression.

Fisher died in Castleford, Yorkshire.
